= Spinal fracture =

- Other names: Vertebral fracture, broken back
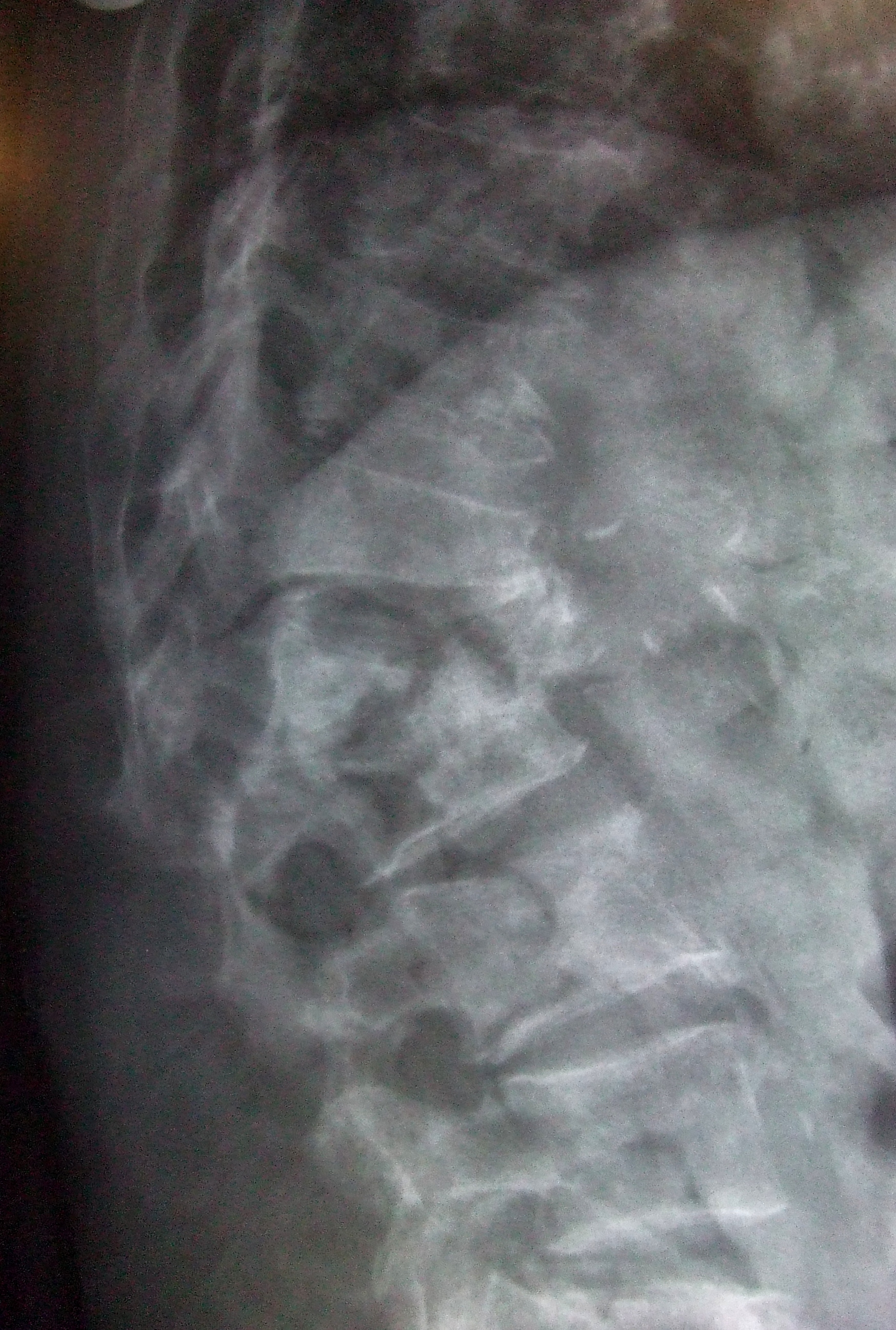
- Lateral spine X-ray showing osteoporotic wedge fractures of L1/2
- Specialty: Orthopedics, neurosurgery, emergency medicine

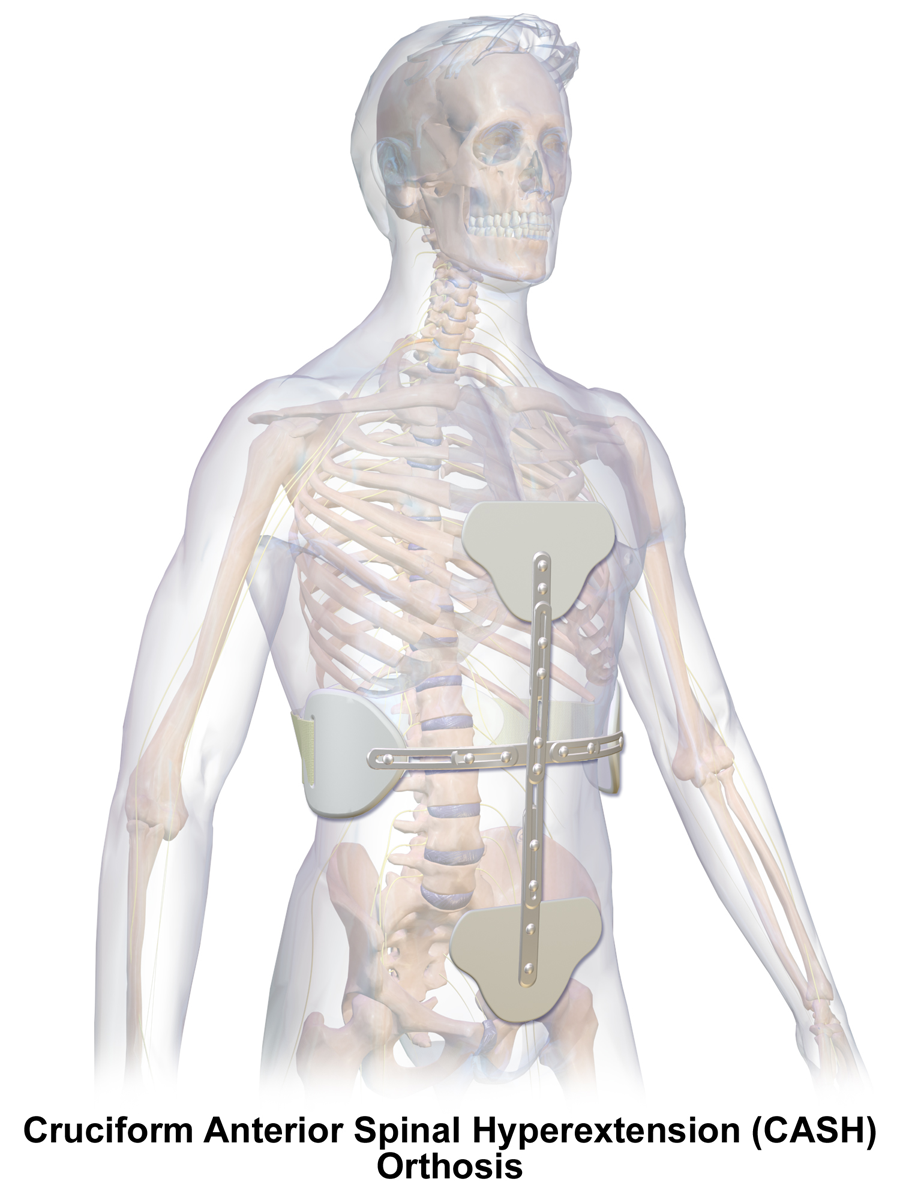
CASH Orthosis.

A spinal fracture, also called a vertebral fracture or a broken back, is a fracture affecting the vertebrae of the spinal column. Most types of spinal fracture confer a significant risk of spinal cord injury. After the immediate trauma, there is a risk of spinal cord injury (or worsening of an already injured spine) if the fracture is unstable, that is, likely to change alignment without internal or external fixation.

== Types ==
- Cervical fracture
  - Fracture of C1, including Jefferson fracture
  - Fracture of C2, including Hangman's fracture
  - Flexion teardrop fracture – a fracture of the anteroinferior aspect of a cervical vertebra
- Clay-shoveler fracture – fracture through the spinous process of a vertebra occurring at any of the lower cervical or upper thoracic vertebrae
- Burst fracture – in which a vertebra breaks from a high-energy axial load
- Compression fracture – a collapse of a vertebra, often resulting in the form of a wedge-shape due to larger compression anteriorly
- Chance fracture – compression injury to the anterior portion of a vertebral body with concomitant distraction injury to posterior elements
- Holdsworth fracture – an unstable fracture dislocation of the thoracolumbar junction of the spine
- Distraction is where there is a pulling apart of the vertebrae. Distraction injuries generally cause breaks in osseous and ligamentous supporting structures, and are therefore generally unstable. A distraction injury on the posterior side of a vertebra can lead to a compression fracture on its anterior side.

== Cervical fracture ==
A medical history and physical examination can be sufficient in clearing the cervical spine. Notable clinical prediction rules to determine which patients need medical imaging are Canadian C-spine rule and the National Emergency X-Radiography Utilization Study (NEXUS).

The AO Foundation has developed a descriptive system for cervical fractures, the AOSpine subaxial cervical spine fracture classification system.

The indication to surgically stabilize a cervical fracture can be estimated from the Subaxial Injury Classification (SLIC).

== Thoracolumbar fracture ==
Vertebral fractures of the thoracic vertebrae, lumbar vertebrae or sacrum are usually associated with major trauma and can cause spinal cord injury that results in a neurological deficit.

=== Thoracolumbar injury classification and severity score ===
The thoracolumbar injury classification and severity score (TLICS) is a scoring system to determine the need to surgically treat a spinal fracture of thoracic or lumbar vertebrae. The score is the sum of three values, each being the score of the most fitting alternative in three categories:

Injury type

- Compression fracture - 1 point
- Burst fracture - 2 points
- Translational rotational injury - 3 points
- Distraction injury - 4 points

Posterior ligamentous complex

- Intact - 0 points
- Suspected injury or indeterminate - 2 points
- Injured - 3 points

Neurology

- Intact - 0 points
- Spinal nerve root injury - 2 points
- Incomplete injury of cord/conus medullaris - 3 points
- Complete injury of cord/conus medullaris (complete) - 2 points
- Cauda equina syndrome - 3 points

A TLICS score of less than 4 indicates non-operative treatment, a score of 4 indicates that the injury may be treated operatively or non-operatively, while a score of more than 4 means that the injury is usually considered for operative management.

=== AOSpine Thoracolumbar Injury Classification System ===
AOSpine Thoracolumbar Injury Classification System (ATLICS) is the most recent classification scheme for thoracolumbar injuries. ATLICS is broadly based on the TLICS system and has sufficient reliability irrespective of the experience of the observer. ATLICS is primarily focused on fracture morphology, and has two additional sections addressing the neurological grading and clinical modifiers:

==== Fracture morphology ====
- Type A: Compression injuries (sub-types A0-A4)
- Type B: Distraction injuries (sub-types B1-B3)
- Type C: Translation injuries

==== Neurological status ====
- N0: neurologically intact
- N1: transient deficit
- N2: radiculopathy
- N3: "incomplete spinal cord injury or cauda equina injury"
- N4: "complete spinal cord injury"
- NX: unknown neurological status

==== Modifiers ====
- M1: unknown tension band injury status
- M2: comorbidities

== Osteoporotic vertebral compression fracture ==
Osteoporosis is a condition causing weakening of the bone due to loss of bone substance. Women are about four times more likely to be affected by osteoporosis than men. Osteoporosis may occur after the menopause or as a result of malnutrition, hyperthyroidism, alcoholism, kidney disease. Osteoporosis may occur after treatment with antiepileptic drugs, proton pump inhibitors, antidepressants, corticosteroids or chemotherapy. Osteoporotic vertebral body compression fractures might occur even after minor trauma or while twisting, bending or coughing.
