= Cervical fracture =

- Other names: Broken neck
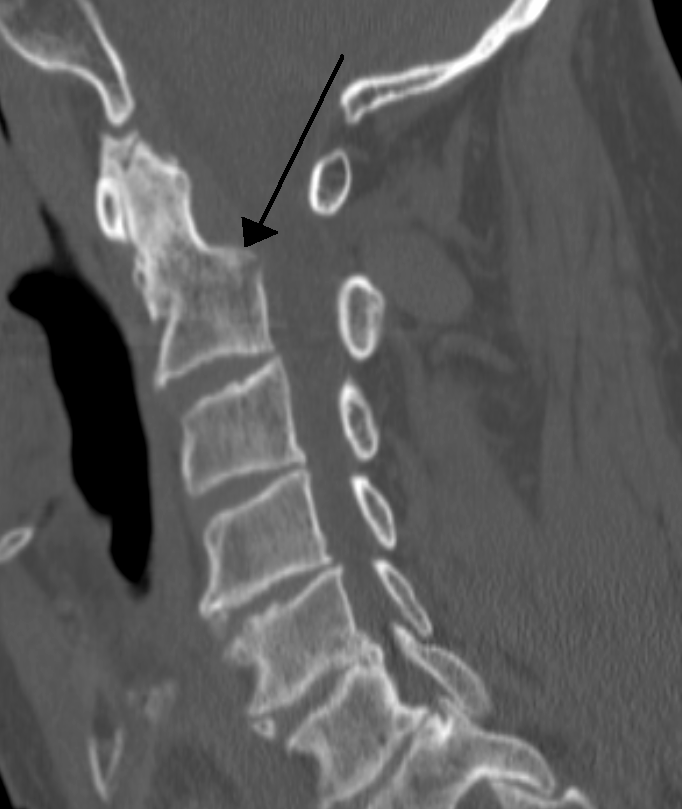
- A fracture of the base of the dens (a part of C2) as seen on CT
- Specialty: Emergency medicine, neurosurgery, orthopedic surgery

A cervical fracture, commonly called a broken neck, is a fracture of any of the seven cervical vertebrae in the neck. Examples of common causes in humans are traffic collisions and diving into shallow water. Abnormal movement of neck bones or pieces of bone can cause a spinal cord injury, resulting in loss of sensation, paralysis, or usually death soon thereafter (~1 min.), primarily via compromising neurological supply to the respiratory muscles and innervation to the heart.

== Epidemiology ==
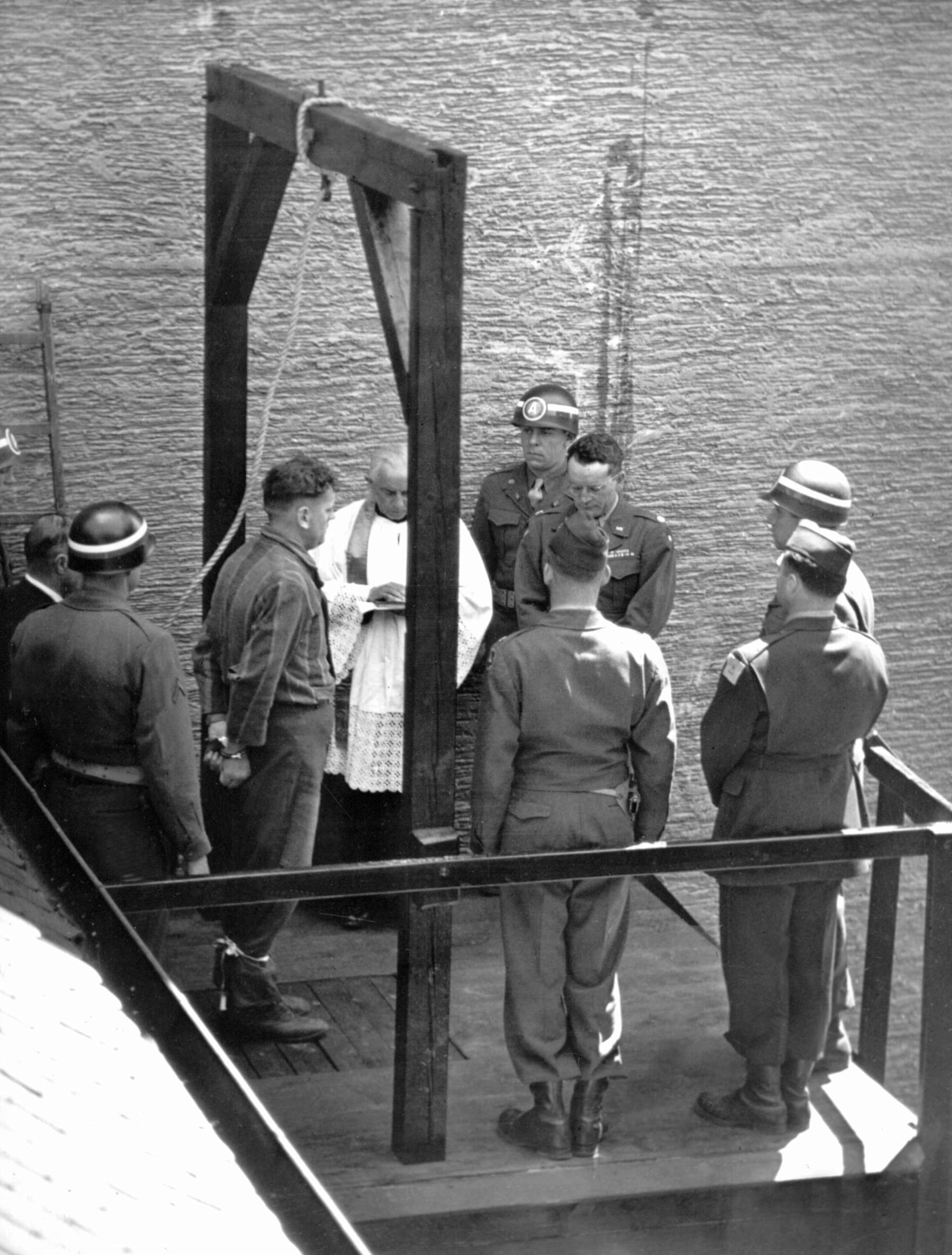
Execution by hanging is intended to cause death from a cervical fracture.

The incidence of cervical fractures differs between countries, but a Norwegian study estimated an incidence of approximately 15 per 100 000 people per year with a male predominance in cervical fracture epidemiology.

Overall incidence has been rising for the last decades, particularly seen in the elderly. Data regarding surgical fracture rates from the U.S show an increased incidence particularly in individuals aged ≥ 80 years.

The mechanism of injury tend to vary both between setting and age group. For the geriatric population, falls (particularly ground-level falls) are the most common mechanism of injury. The relative incidence of cervical spine fracture is increased significantly with age. In younger populations and low-income countries, high-energy trauma such as vehicle collisions are more common cause for cervical fracture.

The cervical spine region allows for a unique mobility despite its biomechanical demands. Different traumatic forces such as hyperflexion/hyperextension may cause fractures. Often specific fracture patterns may correspond to a specific force. Patient factors such as age and bone quality is may also give rise to specific fractures.

Sports that involve violent physical contact carry a risk of cervical fracture, including American football, association football (especially the goalkeeper), ice hockey, rugby, and wrestling. Spearing an opponent in football or rugby, for instance, can cause a broken neck. Cervical fractures may also be seen in some non-contact sports, such as gymnastics, skiing, diving, surfing, powerlifting, equestrianism, mountain biking, and motor racing.

Certain penetrating neck injuries can also cause cervical fracture, which can also cause internal bleeding among other complications.

Execution by hanging is intended to cause a fatal cervical fracture. The knot in the noose is placed to the left of the condemned, so that at the end of the drop, the head is jolted sharply upwards and to the right. The force breaks the neck, causing an immediate loss of consciousness and death within a few minutes.

== Diagnosis ==
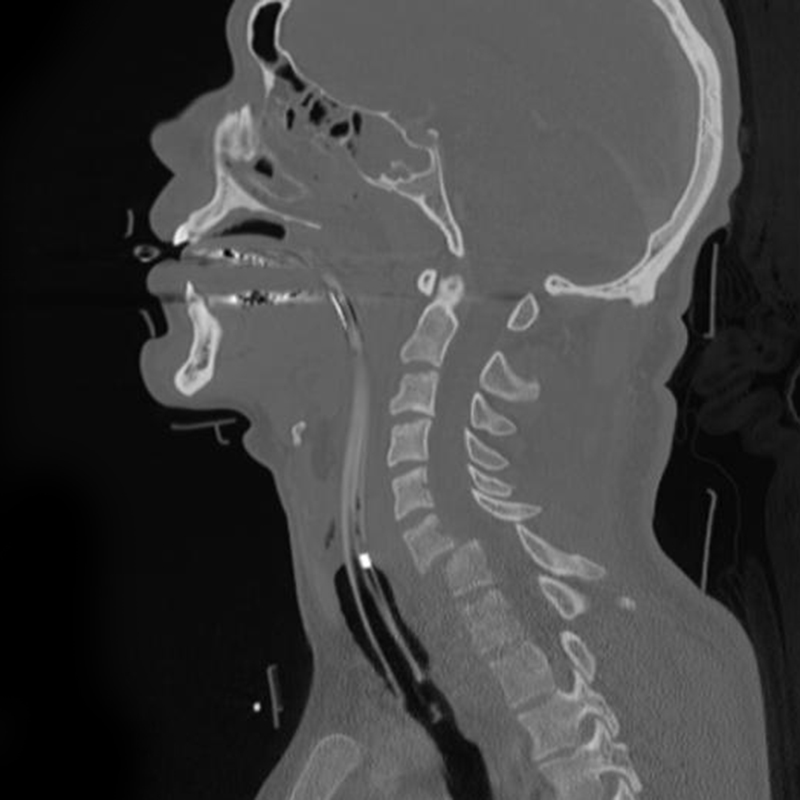
Sagittal reconstruction of a CT scan showing a cervical fracture with dislocation at the level of C6/7

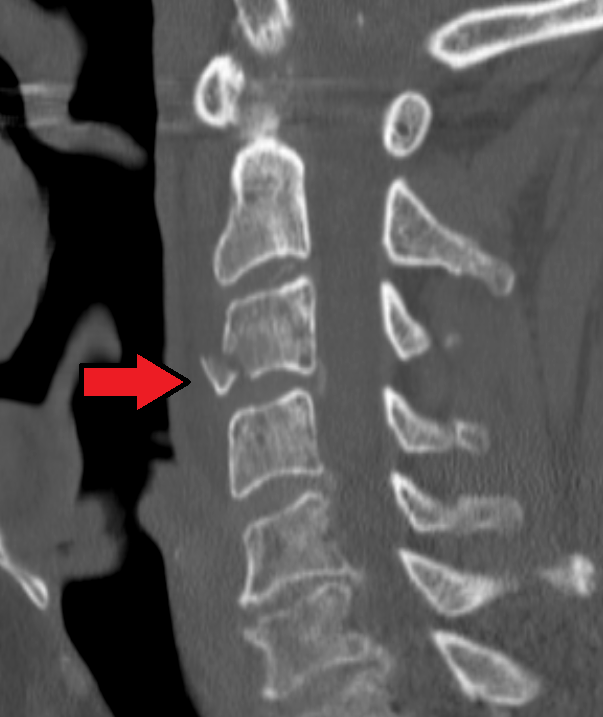
Teardrop fracture of C3 (sagittal CT)

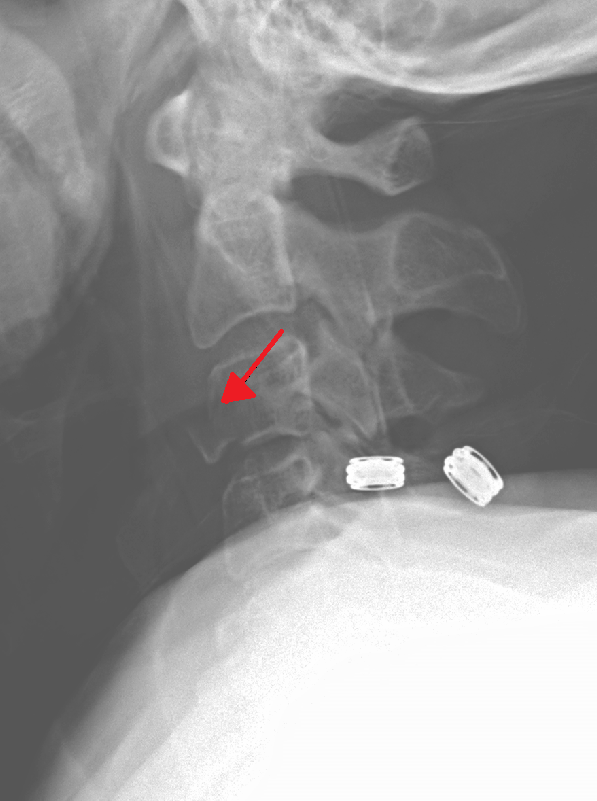
Teardrop fracture of C3 (lateral X ray)

=== Physical examination ===
A medical history and physical examination can be sufficient in clearing the cervical spine. Notable clinical prediction rules to determine which patients need medical imaging are Canadian C-spine rule and the National Emergency X-Radiography Utilization Study (NEXUS).

=== Choice of medical imaging ===
- In children, a CT scan of the neck is indicated in more severe cases such as neurologic deficits, whereas X-ray is preferable in milder cases, by both US and UK guidelines. Swedish guidelines recommend CT rather than X-ray in all children over the age of 5.
- In adults, UK guidelines are largely similar as in children. US guidelines, on the other hand, recommend CT in all cases where medical imaging is indicated, and that X-ray is only acceptable where CT is not readily available.

=== Radiographic detection ===
On CT scan or X-ray, a cervical fracture may be directly visualized. In addition, indirect signs of injury by the vertebral column are incongruities of the vertebral lines, and/or increased thickness of the prevertebral space:

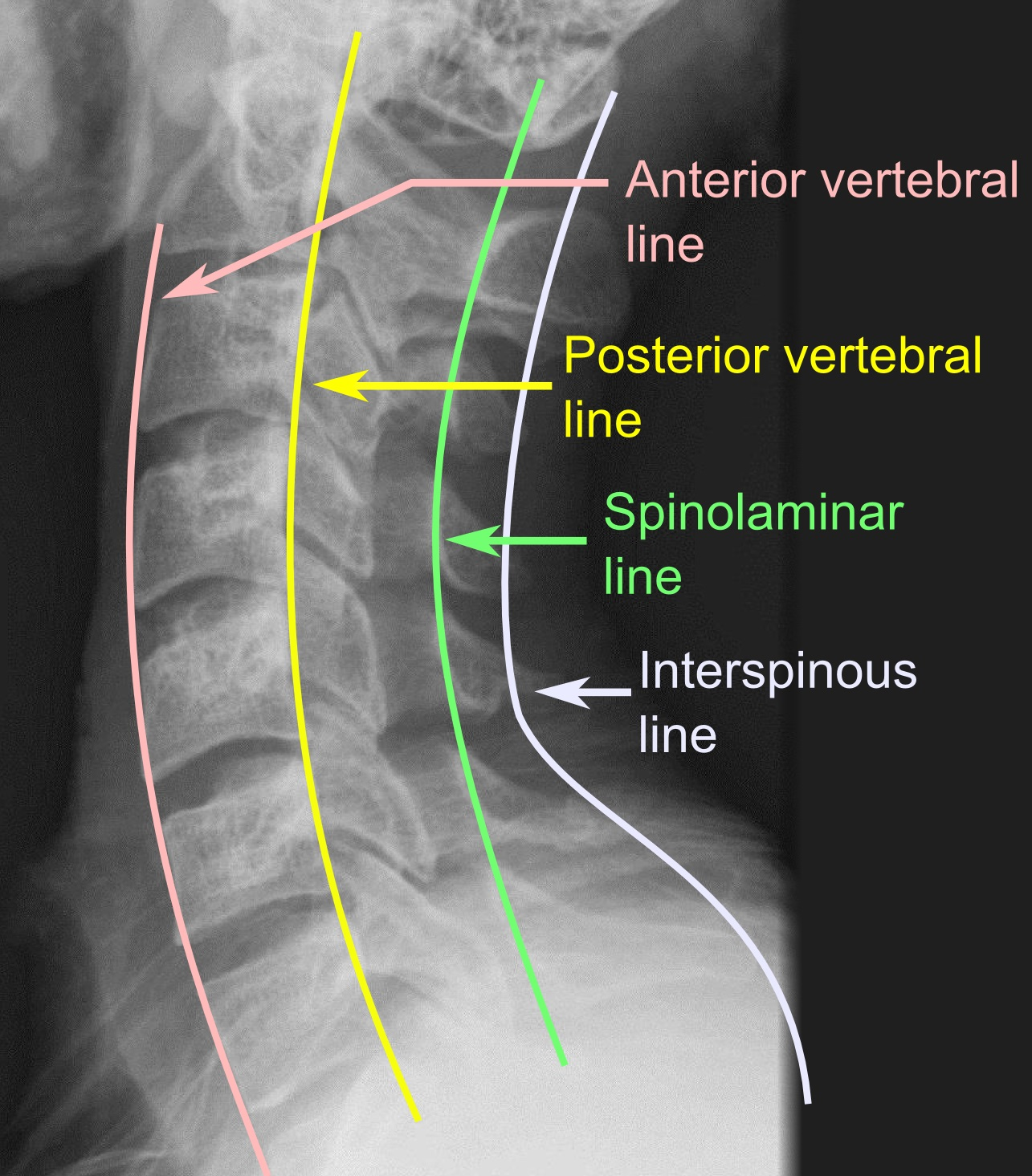
X-ray of normal congruous vertebral lines

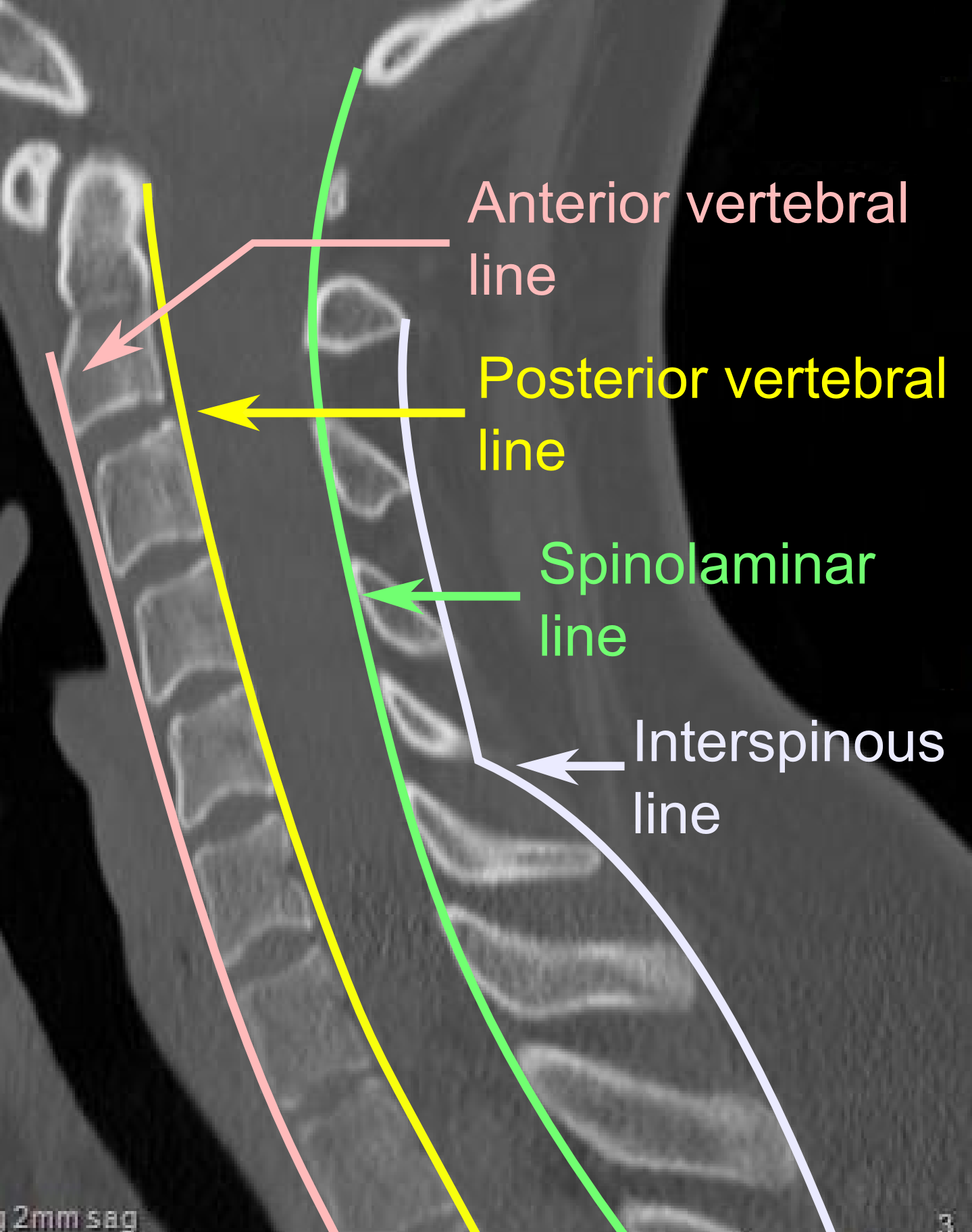
CT scan of normal congruous vertebral lines

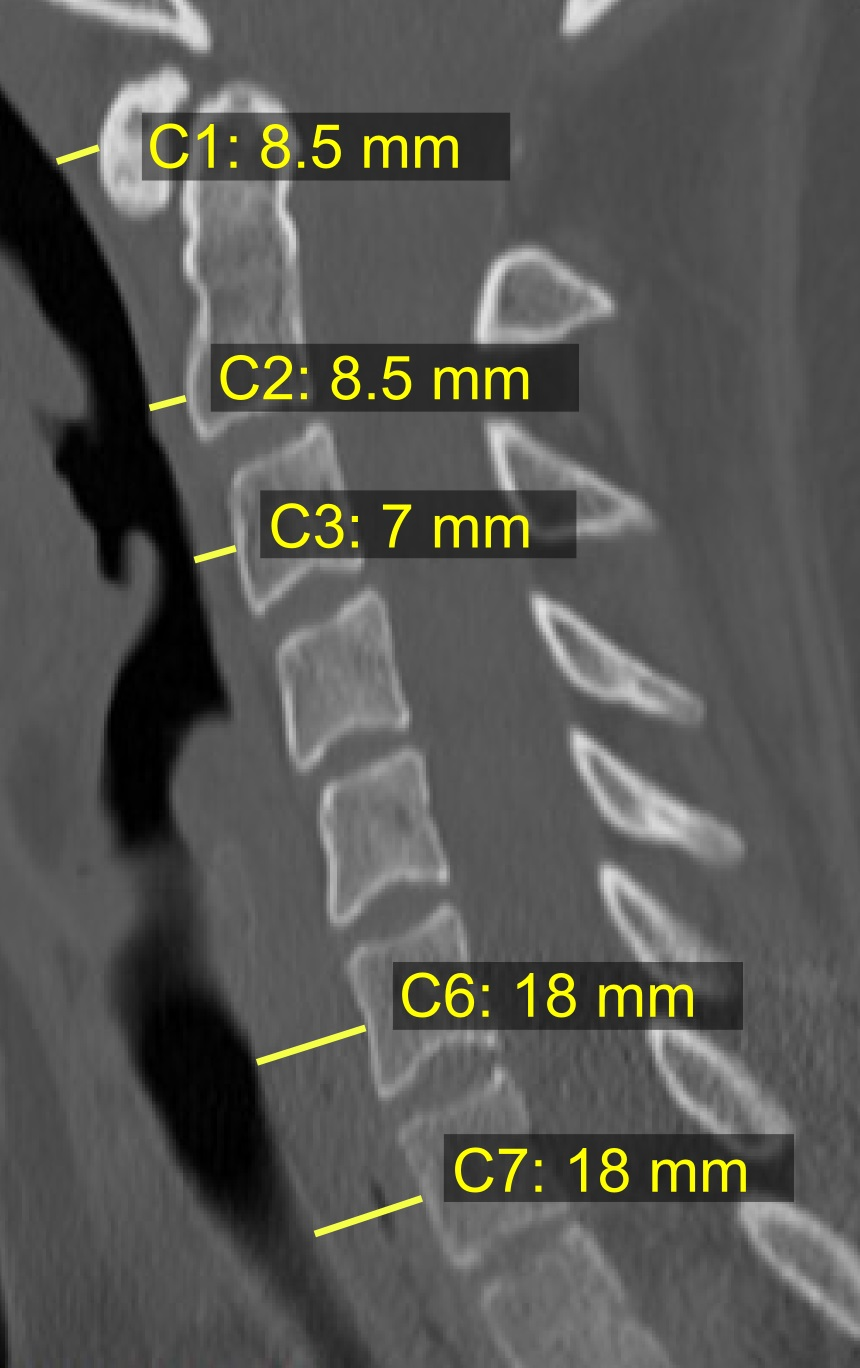
CT scan with upper limits of the thickness of the prevertebral space at different levels

=== Classification ===
There are proper names for several types of cervical fractures, including:

- Fracture of C1, including Jefferson fracture
- Fracture of C2, including Hangman's fracture
- Flexion teardrop fracture – a fracture of the anteroinferior aspect of a cervical vertebra

The AO Foundation has developed a descriptive system for cervical fractures, the AOSpine subaxial cervical spine fracture classification system.

=== Surgery indication ===
The indication to surgically stabilize a cervical fracture can be estimated from the Subaxial Injury Classification (SLIC). In this system, a score of 3 or less indicates that conservative management is appropriate, a score of 5 or more indicates that surgery is needed, and a score of 4 is equivocal. The score is the sum from 3 different categories: morphology, discs and ligaments, and neurology:

SLIC system
Points
Morphology
No abnormality	0
Vertebral compression	1
Burst	+1 (=2)
Distraction (facet joint perch, hyperextension)	3
Rotation / translation (facet joint dislocation, unstable teardrop, advanced flexion-compression	4
Discs and ligaments
Intact	0
Indeterminate (isolated widening between spinous processes, magnetic resonance change)	1
Disrupted (widened disc space, facet perch, dislocation)	2
Neurology
No neurological symptoms	0
Damaged nerve root	1
Complete spinal cord injury	2
Incomplete spinal cord injury (risk of worsening without surgery)	3
Continuous cord compression with neurological deficit	+1

== Treatment ==
Complete immobilization of the head and neck should be done as early as possible and before moving the patient. Immobilization should remain in place until movement of the head and neck is proven safe. In the presence of severe head trauma, cervical fracture must be presumed until ruled out. Immobilization is imperative to minimize or prevent further spinal cord injury. The only exceptions are when there is imminent danger from an external cause, such as becoming trapped in a burning building.

Non-steroidal anti-inflammatory drugs, such as aspirin or ibuprofen, are contraindicated because they interfere with bone healing. Paracetamol is a better option. Patients with cervical fractures will likely be prescribed medication for pain control.

In the long term, physical therapy will be given to build strength in the muscles of the neck to increase stability and better protect the cervical spine.

Collars, traction and surgery can be used to immobilize and stabilize the neck after a cervical fracture.

=== Cervical collar ===
Minor fractures can be immobilized with a cervical collar without need for traction or surgery. A soft collar is fairly flexible and is the least limiting but can carry a high risk of further neck damage in patients with osteoporosis. It can be used for minor injuries or after healing has allowed the neck to become more stable.

A range of manufactured rigid collars are also used, usually comprising a firm plastic bi-valved shell secured with hook-and-loop fasteners and removable padded liners. Cervical collars can be used with additional chest and head extension pieces to increase stability.

=== Rigid braces ===
Rigid braces that support the head and chest are also prescribed. Examples include the Sterno-Occipital Mandibular Immobilization Device (SOMI), Lerman Minerva and Yale types. Special patients, such as very young children or non-cooperative adults, are sometimes still immobilized in medical plaster of Paris casts, such as the Minerva cast.

=== Traction ===
Traction can be applied by free weights on a pulley or a halo type brace. The halo brace is the most rigid cervical brace, used when limiting motion to the minimum that is essential, especially with unstable cervical fractures. It can provide stability and support during the time (typically 8–12 weeks) needed for the cervical bones to heal.

=== Surgery ===
Surgery may be needed to stabilize the neck and relieve pressure on the spinal cord. A variety of surgeries are available depending on the injury. Surgery to remove a damaged intervertebral disc may be done to relieve pressure on the spinal cord. The discs are cushions between the vertebrae. After the disc is removed, the vertebrae may be fused together to provide stability. Metal plates, screws, or wires may be needed to hold vertebrae or pieces in place.

== History ==
Hippocrates, an ancient Greek physician, developed methods to treat spinal fractures which were not accompanied by paralysis. The main goal was to counteract developing kyphosis, which for example he tried to achieve by letting the patient lie in prone position before being stretched.

Arab physician and surgeon Ibn al-Quff (d. 1286 CE) described a treatment of cervical fractures through the oral route in his book Kitab al-ʿUmda fı Ṣinaʿa al-Jiraḥa (Book of Basics in the Art of Surgery).

It was not until the nineteenth century the development of modern spinal surgery started, mostly due to the introduction of anesthesia. At the beginning, cervical surgery was only performed to treat Pott's disease. Then the approaches were limited to posterior approaches most likely due to the spinous processus which are easy to palpate.

== See also ==
- Brown-Séquard syndrome
- Cervical dislocation
- Internal decapitation
- Spinal cord injury
