= Hangman's fracture =

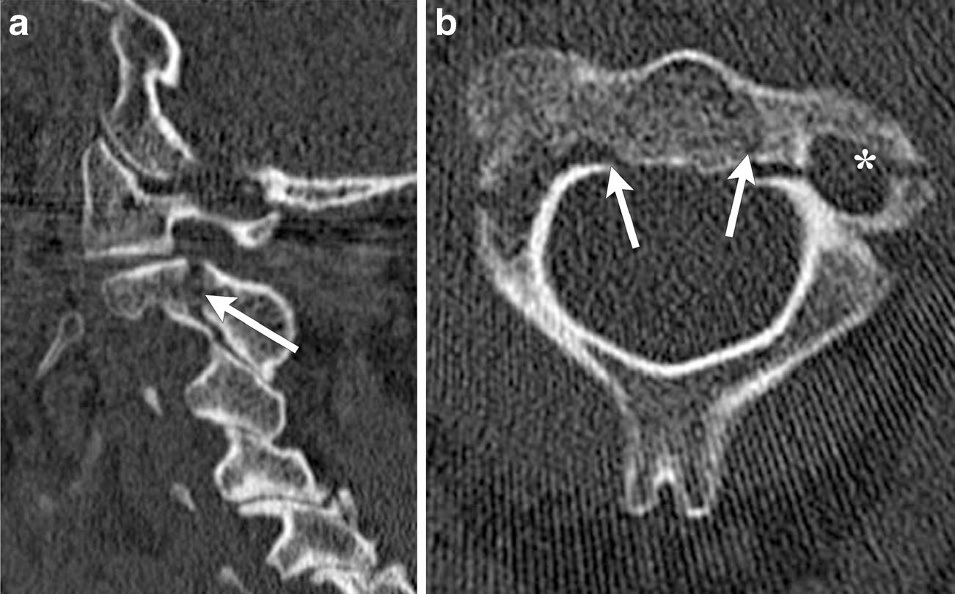
- CT scan of hangman's fracture
- Specialty: Orthopedic

Hangman's fracture is the colloquial name given to a fracture of both pedicles, or partes interarticulares, of the axis vertebra (C2).

== Causes ==
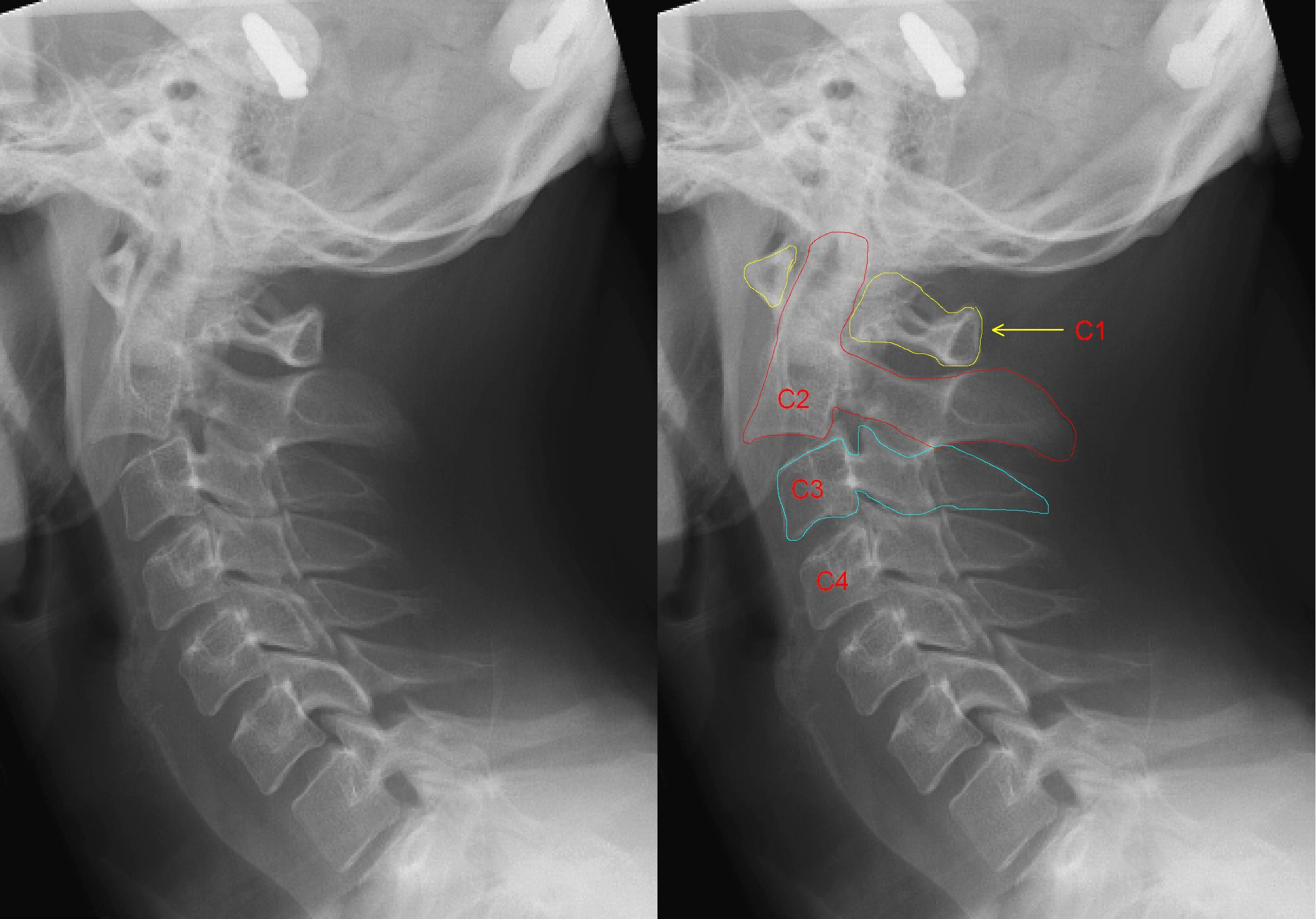
X-ray of the cervical spine with a Hangman's fracture. Left without, right with annotation. It can be seen clearly that C2 (red outline) is moved forward with respect to C3 (blue outline).

The injury mainly occurs from falls, usually in elderly adults, and motor accidents mainly due to impacts of high force causing extension of the neck and great axial load onto the C2 vertebra. In a study based in Norway, 60% of reported cervical fractures came from falls and 21% from motor-related accidents. According to the Agency for Healthcare Research and Quality (AHRQ), the group under the highest risk of C2 fractures are elderly people within the age group of 65–84 (39.02%) at risks of falls (61%) or motor accidents (21%) in metropolitan areas (94%). There were 203 discharges from the age group 1-17; 1,843 from 18- to 44-year-olds; 2,147 from 45- to 64-year-olds, 4,890 from 65- to 84-year-olds, and 3440 from 85+-year-olds. Females accounted for 54.45% of occurrences while males accounted for the other 45.38%.

== Mechanisms ==
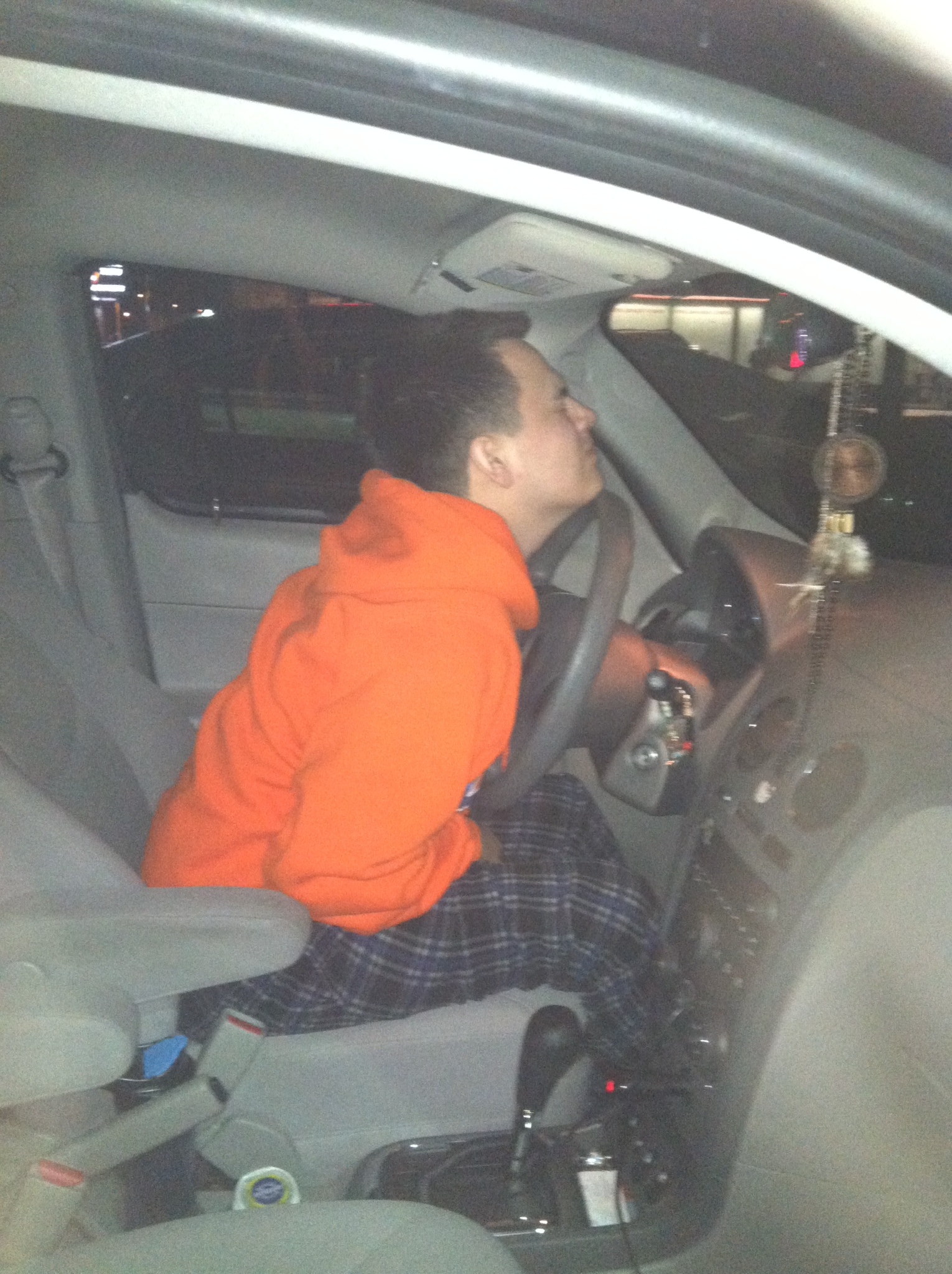
A demonstration of a common mechanism of a hangman's fracture in a car accident

The mechanism of the injury is forcible hyperextension of the head, usually with distraction of the neck. This commonly occurs during judicial hanging, when the noose was placed below the condemned subject's chin. When the subject was dropped, the head would be forced into hyperextension by the full weight of the body, a sufficient force to cause the fracture. Despite its long association with judicial hangings, one study of a series of such hangings showed that only a small minority of hangings produced a hangman's fracture.

Apart from hangings, the mechanism of injury—a sudden forceful hyperextension centered just under the chin—occurs mainly with deceleration injuries in which the victim's face or chin strike an unyielding object with the neck in extension. The most common scenario is a frontal motor vehicle accident with an unrestrained passenger or driver, with the person striking the dashboard or windshield with their face or chin. Other scenarios include falls, diving injuries, and collisions between players in contact sports.

Although a hangman's fracture is unstable, survival from this fracture is relatively common, as the fracture itself tends to expand the spinal canal at the C2 level. It is not unusual for patients to walk in for treatment and have such a fracture discovered on X-rays. Only if the force of the injury is severe enough that the vertebral body of C2 is severely subluxed from C3 does the spinal cord become crushed, usually between the vertebral body of C3 and the posterior elements of C1 and C2.

== Prevention ==
=== Car crashes ===
Most commonly this can occur during a car accident. A person involved in a car crash, especially with no seat belt, can slam their chin against the steering wheel, dashboard, or windshield, causing the hyperextension to occur.

=== Contact sports ===
Falling and colliding with other people in a contact sport can also cause this fracture. Falling causes the weight of the body to force hyperextension. In full-contact sports such as American football and Rugby, diving for the ball can lead a player to land on his head, forcing the neck into hyperextension. The further piling of players on top of an injured player adds more weight and can lead to further occurrences of this fracture.

== Treatment ==
=== Non-surgical or surgical ===
Hangman's fractures treatments are both non-surgical and surgical.

=== Benefits of surgical hangman's fracture treatment ===
Sasso also observed that people who underwent surgical treatment will not be affected by pin site infections, brain abscesses, facet joint stiffness, loss of spinal alignment, and skin breakdown. Another study concerns the surgical treatment of the ring of axis conducted by Barsa and coauthors (2006) based on 30 cases within 41 patients treated by using anterior cervical fixation and fusion and 11 cases treated by a posterior CT.

=== Result of the surgical treatment ===
As a result, Barsa and coauthors showed that the result of fracture fusion reduced after one year but only one patient died of other disease during the follow-up. Hakalo and Wronski (2008) showed the benefits of operative treatment such as using transoral C2-C3 discectomy with plate-cage stabilization or posterior direct pars screw repair for the reducing and healing process. In deliberate or suicidal hanging, asphyxia is much more likely to be the cause of death due to associated prevertebral swelling. A common sign is a constricted pupil (Horner's syndrome) on the ipsilateral side due to loss of sympathetic innervation to the eye, caused by damage to the sympathetic trunk in the neck.

== Epidemiology ==
The pie chart shows the incidence of C2 fractures according to age groups. For the <17 age group, there were 203 incidents. For ages 18-44 there were 1843. For 45-64 there were 2147. For 65-84 there were 4890 and for 85+ there were 3440 incidents. A total of 12,532 discharges in America were reported in 2010.

The C2 fracture accounts for nearly 19% of spinal fractures and 55% of cervical fractures (in patients with head injury). Within C2 fractures, the hangman's fracture accounts for 23% of occurrences while the odontoid or dens fracture accounts for 55% of them.

== Society ==
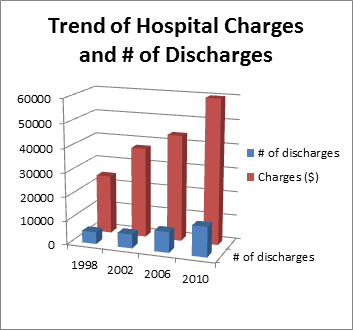
The graph shows the trend of hospital charges and number of discharges over the span of 12 years in the U.S.A. In 1998, hospital costs were $24,423 with 4,991 discharged. In 2010 hospital charges increased to 59,939 with 12,532 discharged.

Statistics from the AHRQ show that there were 12,532 hospital discharges from C2 fractures in the US during 2010. The mean healthcare costs were $17,015 and the "national bill" or the aggregate charges were $749,553,403. Only 460 in-hospital deaths related to the C2 fracture occurred. From 2000 to 2010, the number of discharges has increased from 4,875 to 12,532, almost a 250 percent increase. Mean health care costs went from $24,771 to $59,939.

== See also ==
- Cervical fracture
- Cervical vertebrae
