= Clearing the cervical spine =

Process of determining the existence of a cervical spine injury

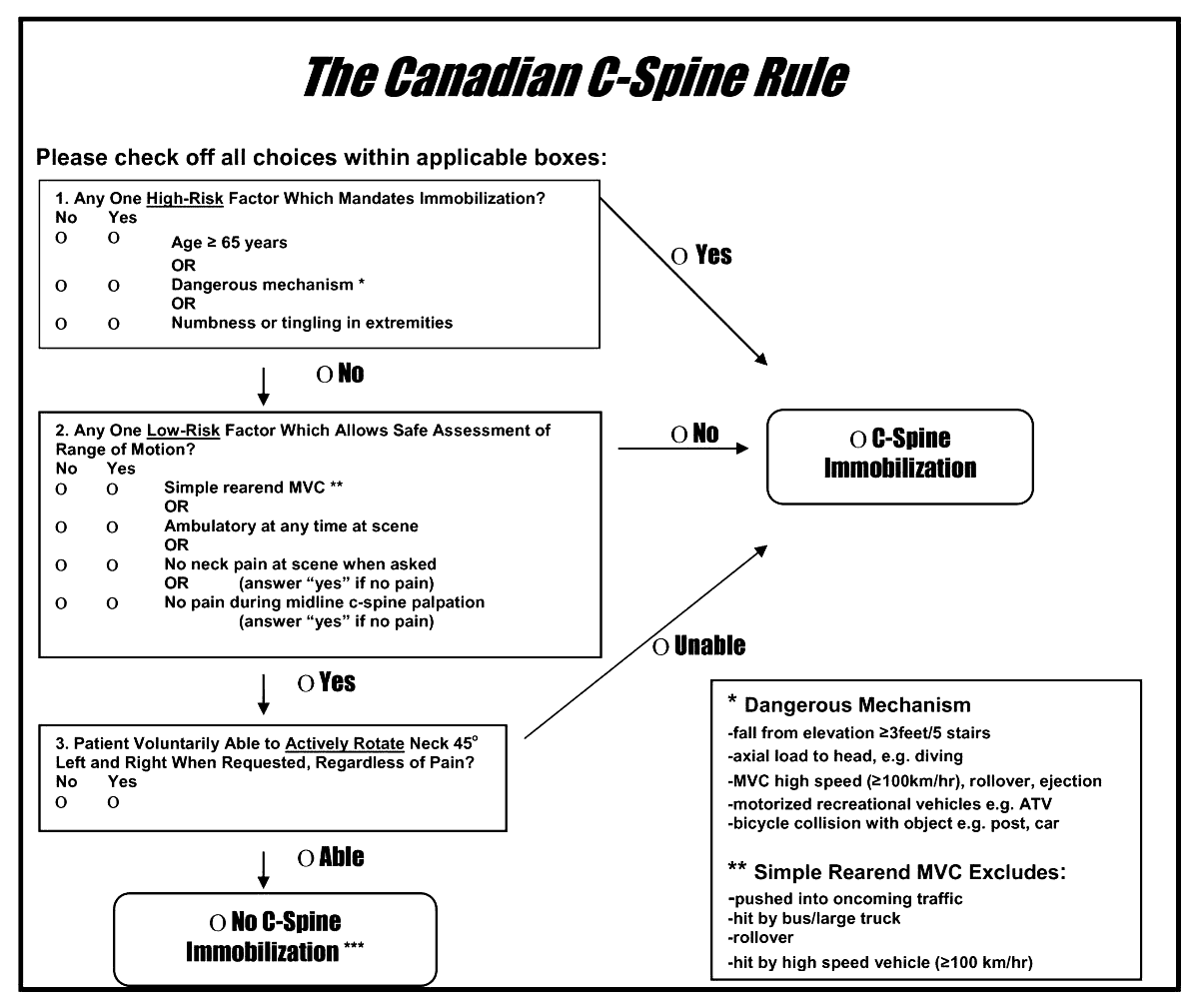
- The Canadian C-spine rule for those with a normal Glasgow coma scale and who are otherwise stable
- MDCalc

Clearing the cervical spine is the process by which medical professionals determine whether cervical spine injuries exist, mainly regarding cervical fracture. It is generally performed in cases of major trauma. This process can take place in the emergency department or in the field by appropriately trained EMS personnel.

If the patient is obtunded, i.e. has a head injury with altered sensorium, is intoxicated, or has been given potent analgesics, the cervical spine must remain immobilized until a clinical examination becomes possible.

Neurosurgeons or orthopaedic surgeons manage any detected injury. Today, most large centers have spine surgery specialists, that have trained in this field after their orthopedic or neurosurgical residency.

== History and examination ==
A medical history and physical examination can be sufficient in clearing the cervical spine. Notable clinical prediction rules to determine which patients need medical imaging are the Canadian C-spine rule and the National Emergency X-Radiography Utilization Study (NEXUS).

The following is based on the NEXUS (National Emergency X-Radiography Utilization Study) criteria.

Excluding a cervical spinal injury requires clinical judgment and training.

Under the NEXUS guidelines, when an acute blunt force injury is present, a cervical spine is deemed to not need radiological imaging if all the following criteria are met:

- There is no posterior midline cervical tenderness
- There is no evidence of intoxication
- The patient is alert and oriented to person, place, time, and event
- There is no focal neurological deficit (see focal neurological signs)
- There are no painful distracting injuries (e.g., long bone fracture)

== Medical imaging ==
=== Choice of method ===
- In children, a CT scan of the neck is indicated in more severe cases such as neurologic deficits, whereas X-ray is preferable in milder cases, by both US and UK guidelines. Swedish guidelines recommend CT rather than X-ray in all children over the age of 5.
- In adults, UK guidelines are largely similar as in children. US guidelines, on the other hand, recommend CT in all cases where medical imaging is indicated, and that X-ray is only acceptable where CT is not readily available.

Magnetic resonance imaging may be useful if it is necessary to exclude a ligament injury. The indication for MR spine is a focal neurological deficit. Another indication for MR of the cervical spine is persistent mid-line neck pain or tenderness despite a normal CT in the awake patient.

=== Imaging settings ===
X-ray consists of a three view cervical x-ray series, adding a swimmer's view if the lateral doesn't include the C7/T1 interface.

CT scan should be thin slices, ideally 1.5 mm or less. It should include first thoracic vertebra.

=== Evaluation ===
CT scan or X-ray images are evaluated for the presence or absence of directly visible fractures. In addition, indirect signs of injury by the vertebral column are incongruities of the vertebral lines, and/or increased thickness of the prevertebral space:

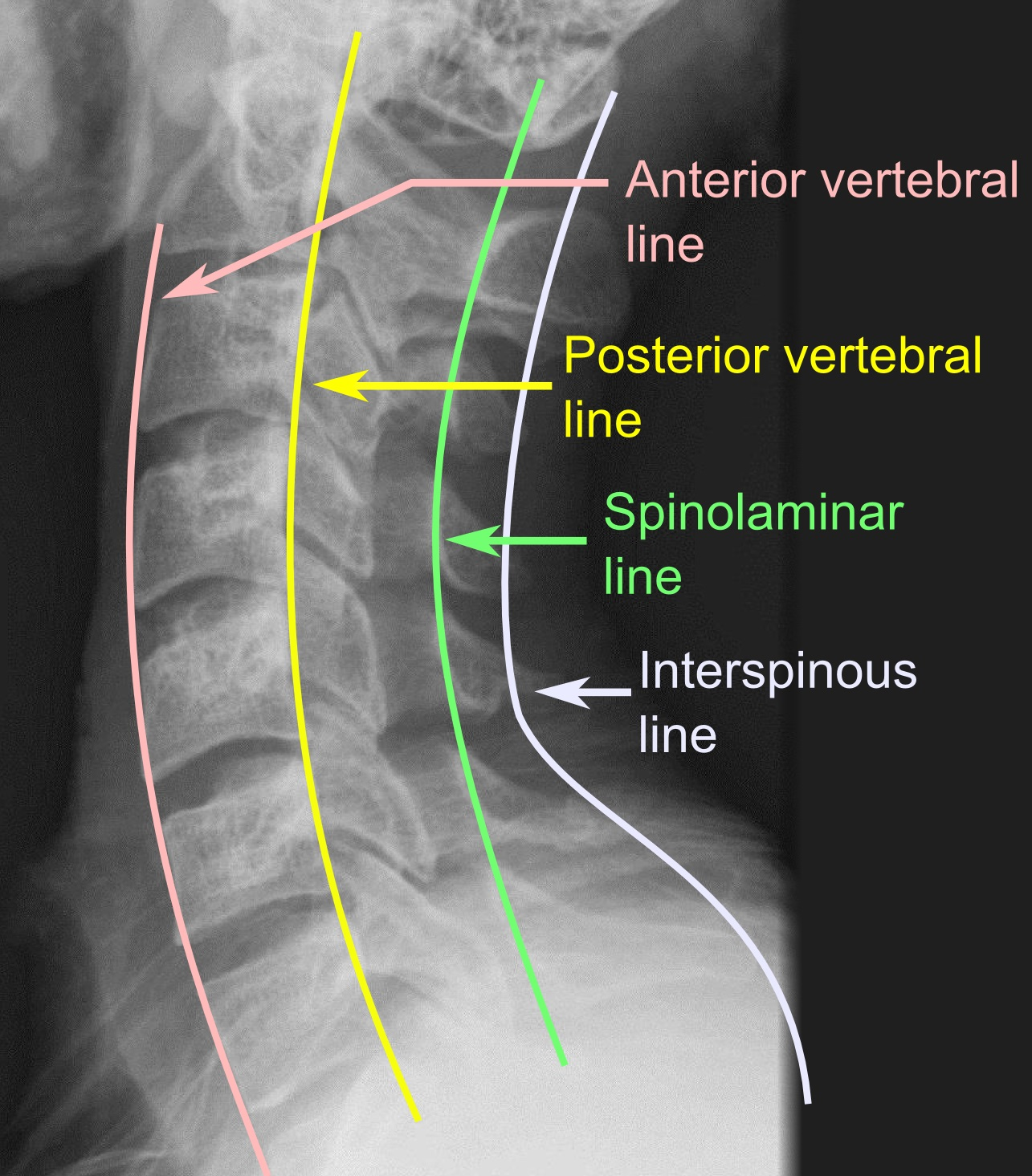
X-ray of normal congruous vertebral lines

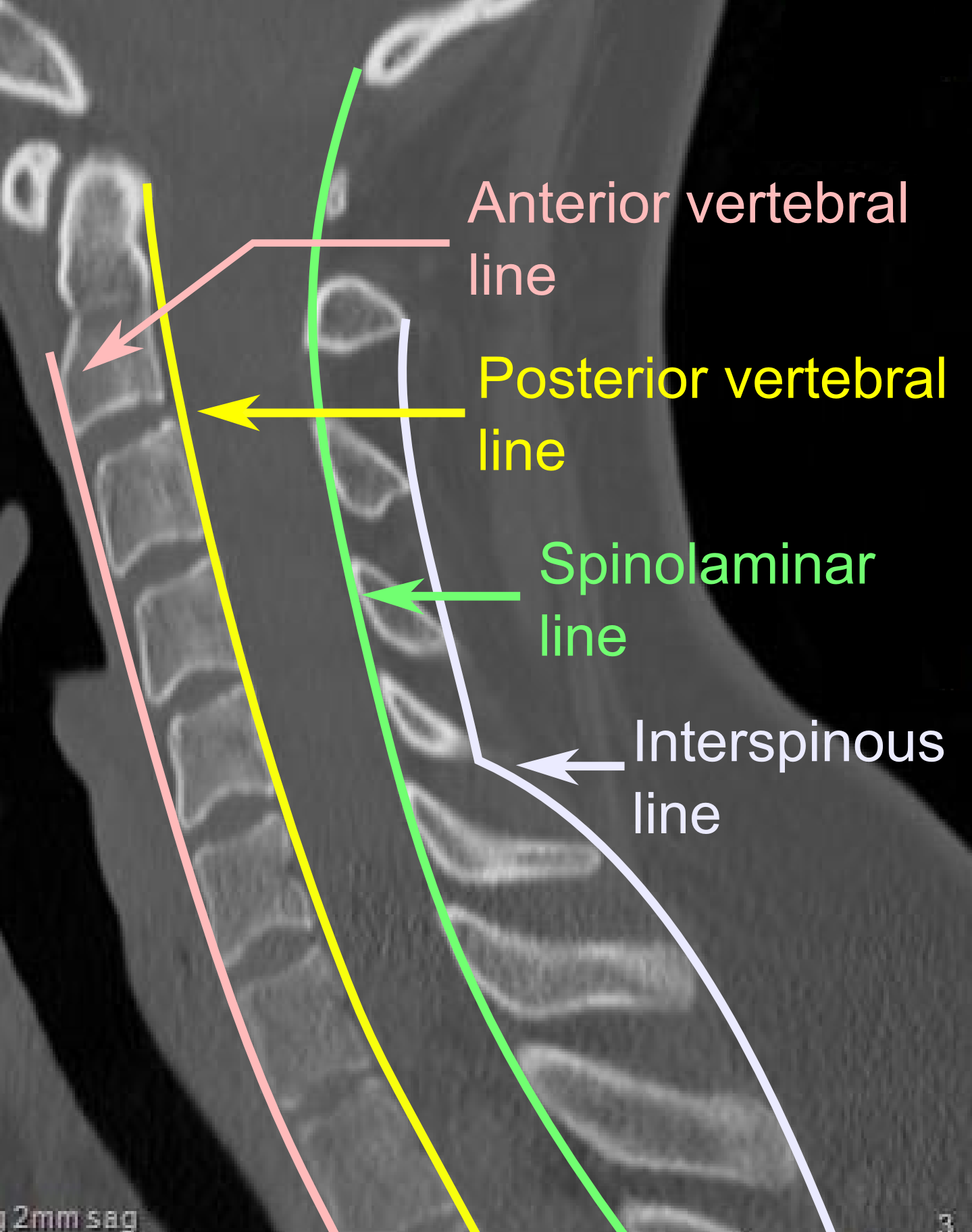
CT scan of normal congruous vertebral lines.

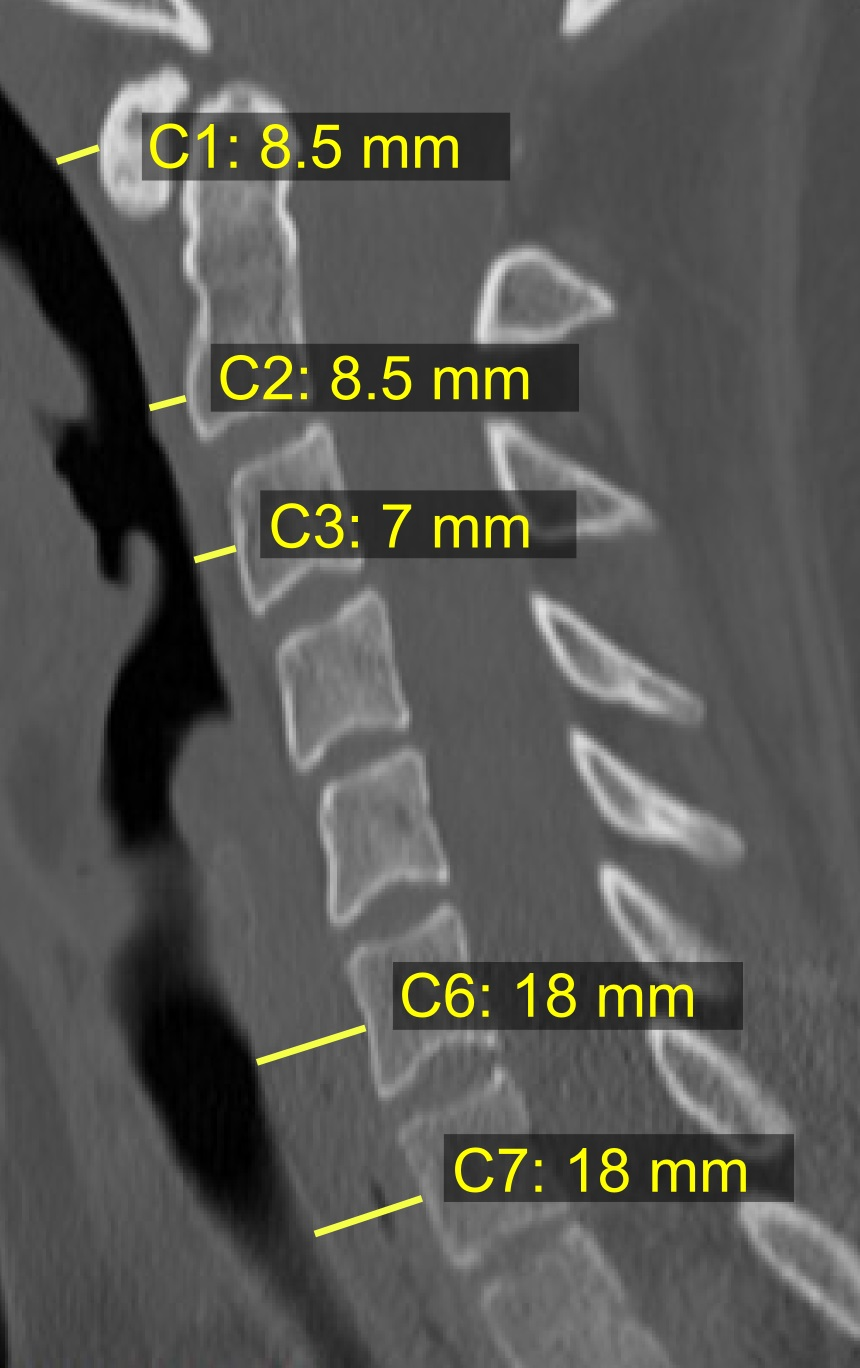
CT scan with upper limits of the thickness of the prevertebral space at different levels.

== After imaging ==
If the patient is not expected to be clinically evaluable within 48–72 hours because of severe head or multiple injuries, they should remain immobilized until a time when such an examination is possible. A 64-slice CT with reconstructions does not entirely rule out ligamentous injury leading to instability, but is a practical means of identifying the majority of C-spine injuries in obtunded patients. MR C-spine has frequent false-positives, limiting its usefulness. In these cases, a consultation with a Spine Surgery specialist is prudent.

== See also ==
- Cervical fracture
- Spinal cord injury
