= Burst fracture =

- Specialty: Neurosurgery

A burst fracture is a type of traumatic spinal injury in which a vertebra breaks from a high-energy axial load (e.g., traffic collisions or falls from a great height or high speed, and some kinds of seizures), with shards of vertebra penetrating surrounding tissues and sometimes the spinal canal. The burst fracture is categorized by the "severity of the deformity, the severity of (spinal) canal compromise, the degree of loss of vertebral body height, and the degree of neurologic deficit." Burst fractures are considered more severe than compression fractures because long-term neurological damage can follow. The neurologic deficits can reach their full extent immediately, or can progress for a prolonged time.

== Diagnosis ==
Diagnosis is by medical imaging.

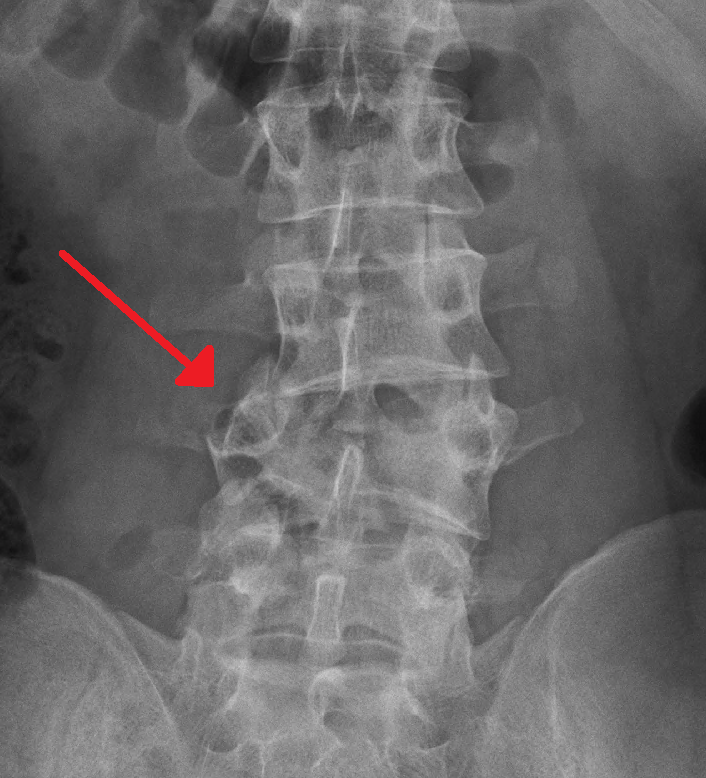
A burst fracture of L4 as seen on plane X ray

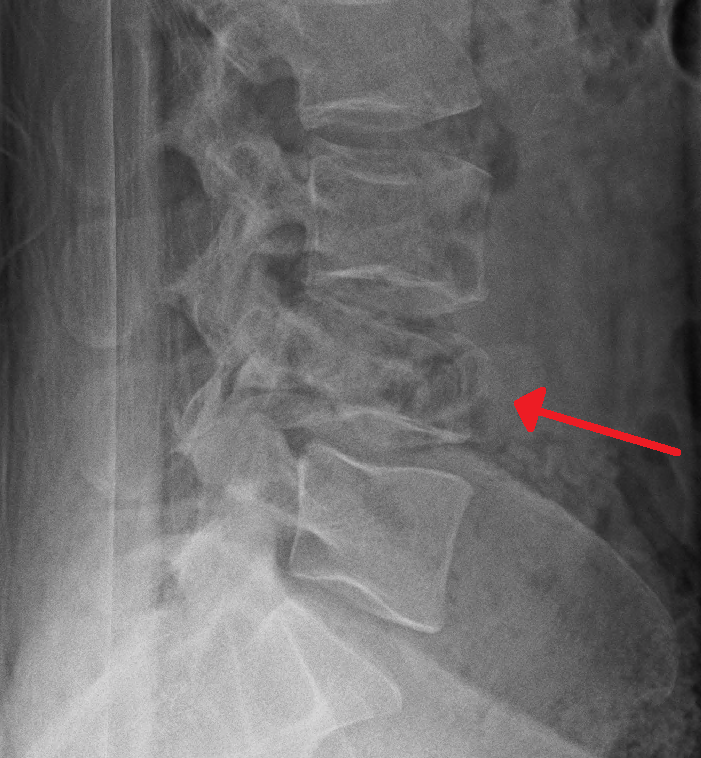
A burst fracture of L4 as seen one plane X ray

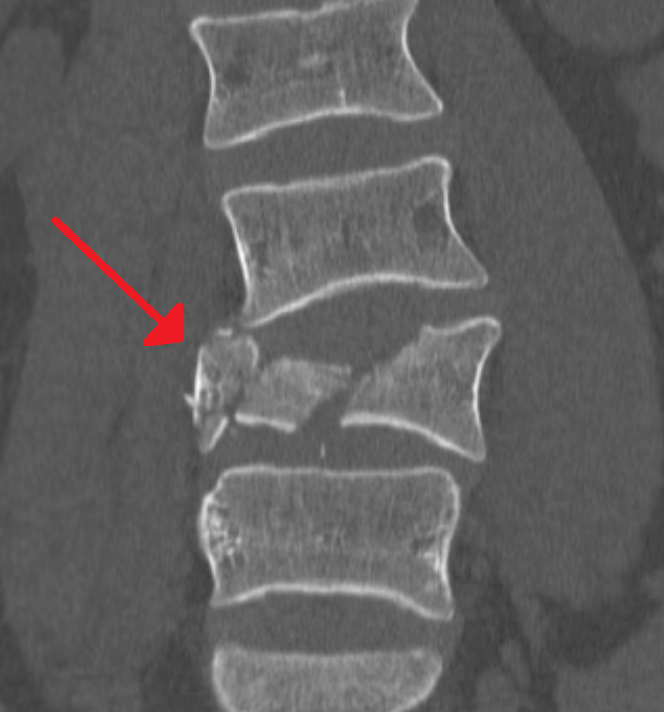
A burst fracture of L4 as seen on CT

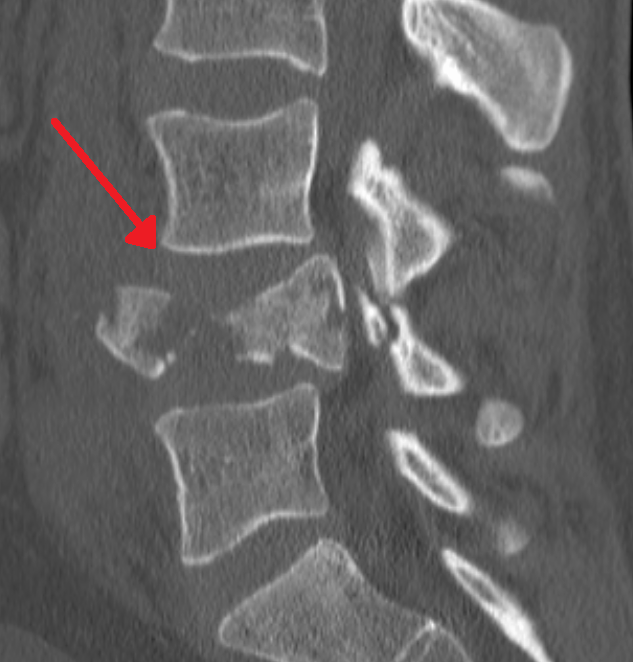
A burst fracture of L4 as seen on CT

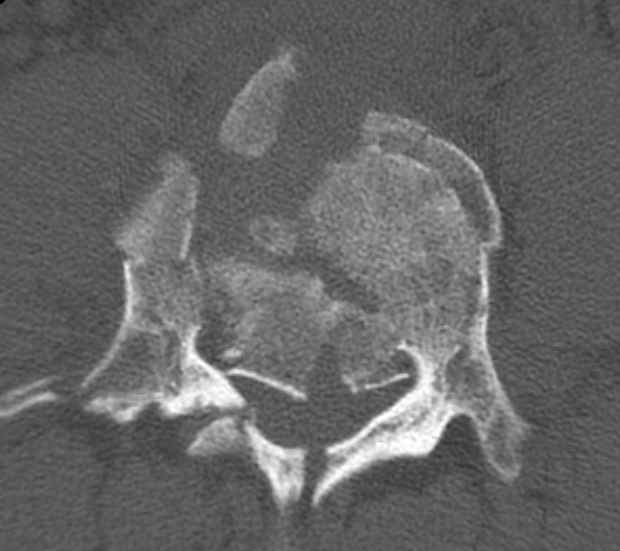
A burst fracture of L4 as seen on CT

== Treatment ==
Immediate hospitalization is required, as such injuries may result in varying degrees of spinal cord injury with possible paralysis. X-rays and MRIs are taken to determine whether the burst fracture can be managed with or without surgery. Surgical management is required when the burst fracture is unstable. Predicting spinal instability of vertebral thoracic lumbar fractures is based on several radiologic and clinical parameters. Efforts to refine fracture classification schemes to better predict instability continue. Application of axial zone model proposed by physicians at Barrow Neurological Institute may enhance the ability to predict stability, depending not only on the number of columns, but also on the number of zones involved in the injuries. Further clinical and biomechanical studies are warranted to validate this model.

Different surgical treatments are available, the most common involving fusion of the remaining vertebra in the traumatized area, and removal of the larger loose vertebra pieces. A "spinal fusion" surgery entails two or more vertebra are permanently immobilized through surgery using titanium implants. Another less common technique is to replace the burst vertebra with an artificial bone or cadaver bone. Both latter strategies have been used successfully in elderly subjects, and has not yet been attempted in younger subjects due to the unknown stability over the long term.

Nonsurgical management is possible when the burst fracture subject is intact neurologically. Nonsurgical treatment involves the use of a full-body, exterior brace, normally a thoracic lumbar sacral orthosis (TLSO), often custom-molded to the subject's body. X-rays and MRIs are again taken with the subject every 2 weeks in the TLSO to determine whether the spine will remain stable. The TLSO is worn for 2–3 months 24/7. The subject undergoes several months of physical therapy to strengthen atrophied muscles and, in some cases, to learn how to walk again. It is probable that the subject may exhibit some spinal dislocation after removal of the TLSO, and it is well within expected parameters with little neurological impact experienced by month 3. If no further major dislocation or subluxation occurs, no other external stabilization may be required.

== Prognosis ==
In the long-term, varying degrees of pain, function, and appearance may affect the traumatized region during the subject's lifetime. A burst fracture results in a permanent decrease in anterior height, varying degrees of kyphosis, and possible changes in neurological signal intensity with possible deterioration over time. Over the subject's lifetime, the subject experiences ancillary pain and discomfort in the spine and limbs caused by increasing neurological dysfunction.
