= Vertebral compression fracture =

Breakage of a spinal vertebra under vertical pressure

Compression fracture
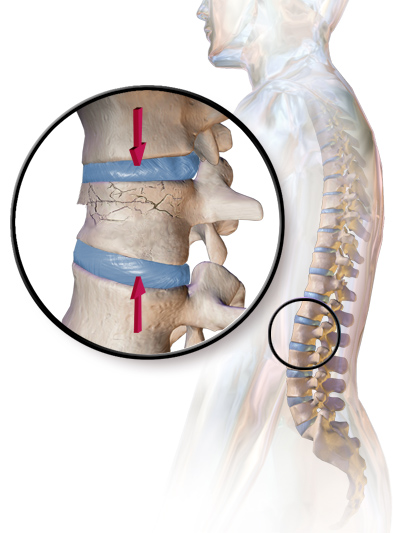
- Example of vertebral compression fracture.
- Specialty: Orthopedic

A compression fracture is a collapse of a vertebra. It may be due to trauma or due to a weakening of the vertebra (compare with burst fracture). This weakening is seen in patients with osteoporosis or osteogenesis imperfecta, lytic lesions from metastatic or primary tumors, or infection. In healthy patients, it is most often seen in individuals suffering extreme vertical shocks, such as ejecting from an ejection seat. Seen in lateral views in plain x-ray films, compression fractures of the spine characteristically appear as wedge deformities, with greater loss of height anteriorly than posteriorly and intact pedicles in the anteroposterior view.

== Signs and symptoms ==
Acute fractures usually present with back pain, with other possible signs including reduced range of motion and even nerve deficits. Additionally, presence of a bruise or scrape combined with localized back pain may indicate the need to further investigate for evidence of a compression fracture. Chronic compression fractures, such as in osteoporosis, may initially be asymptomatic, but will later often lead to back pain, spinal deformities, loss of height, and neurologic issues.

== Causes ==
Traumatic compression fractures tend to occur after a significant fall or impact, but in those with low bone density even daily activities can result in a fracture. Atraumatic fractures are usually attributable to an underlying issue such as osteoporotic bone, tumors, and infections.

Risk factors include osteoporosis, history of previous compression fractures, elderly age, and postmenopausal status.

== Mechanism ==
The pathophysiology of vertebral compression fractures stems from decreasing trabecular bone in vertebral bodies, usually from an imbalance in bone resorption and formation (most commonly due to osteoporosis), leading to weakened vertebrae prone to fracture. Factors that can contribute to trabecular bone loss include lack of physical activity, nutrition, aging, medications, genetics, and systemic disease. Women in postmenopause are especially prone to increased trabecular bone loss as a result of hormonal changes.

== Diagnosis ==
Compression fractures are usually diagnosed on spinal radiographs, often incidentally, where a vertebral deformity may be visible or there may be loss of height of the vertebra. Compression fractures are frequently classified using the Genant classification based on the pattern of vertebral height loss: wedge, biconcave, and crush. In addition, bone density measurement may be performed to evaluate for osteoporosis. When a tumor is suspected as the underlying cause, or there is evidence of nerve deficits, CT or MRI scans may be performed. Clinical guidelines can help determine appropriate imaging for individuals with newly diagnosed symptomatic fractures, back pain with history of prior compression fractures, and history of malignancy.

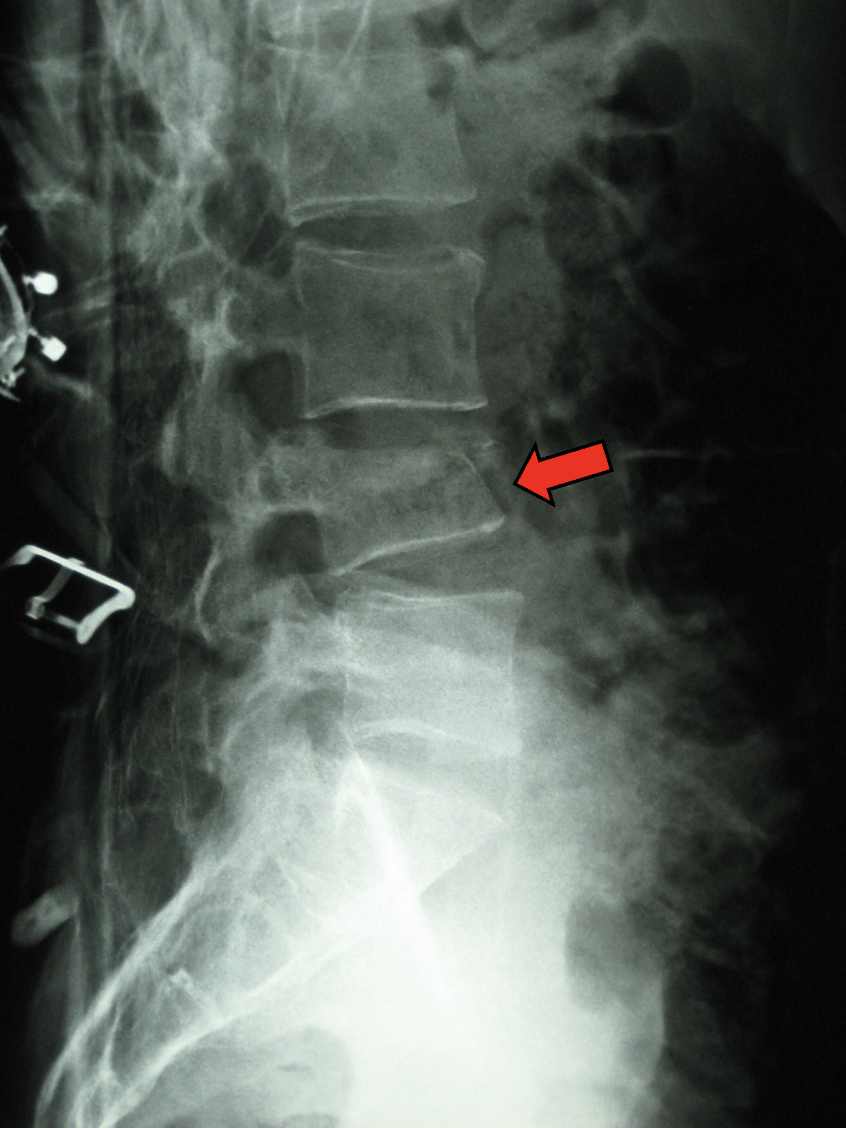
Compression fracture of the fourth lumbar vertebra post falling from a height.

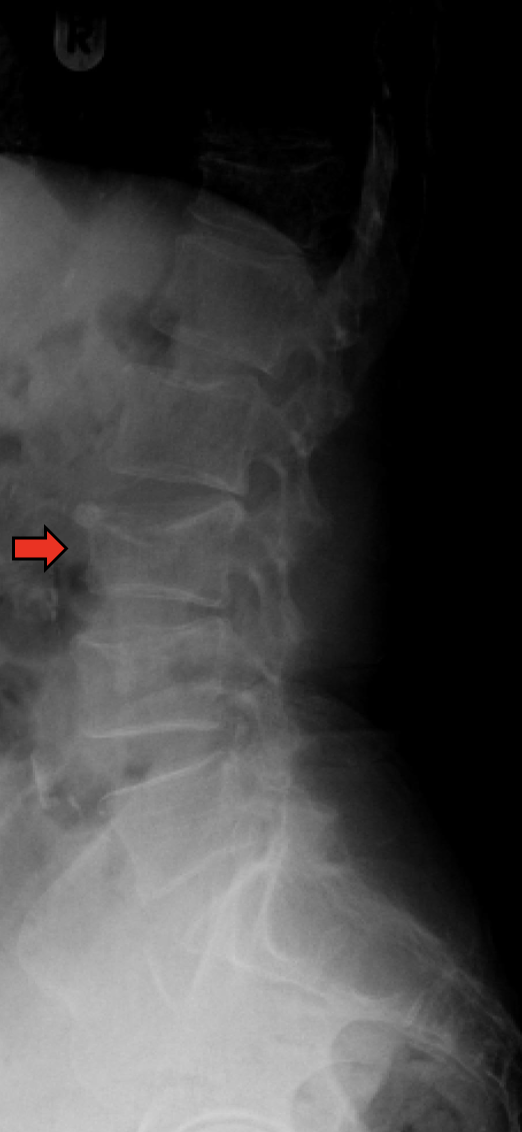
X-ray of the lumbar spine with a compression fracture of the third lumbar vertebra.

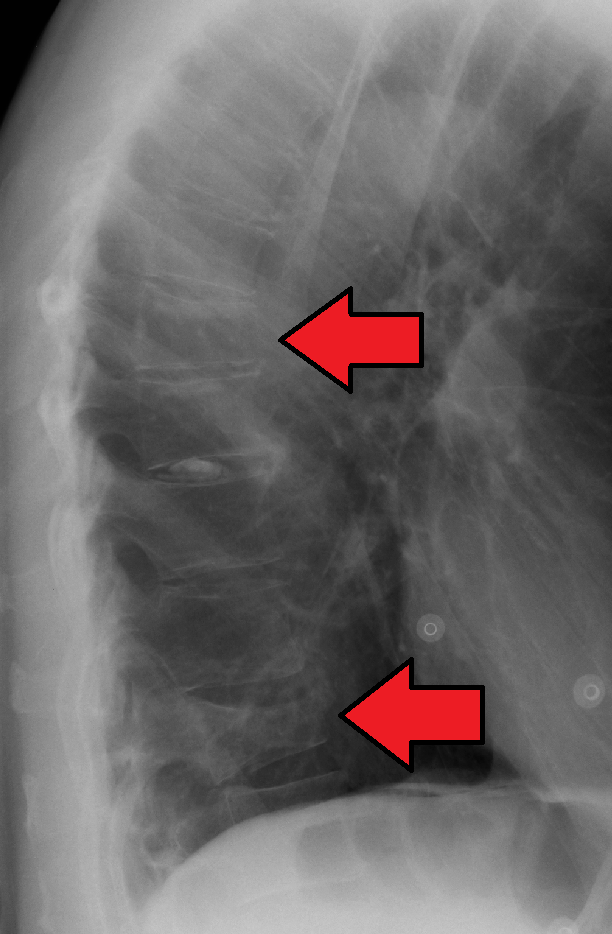
Compression fracture of T12.

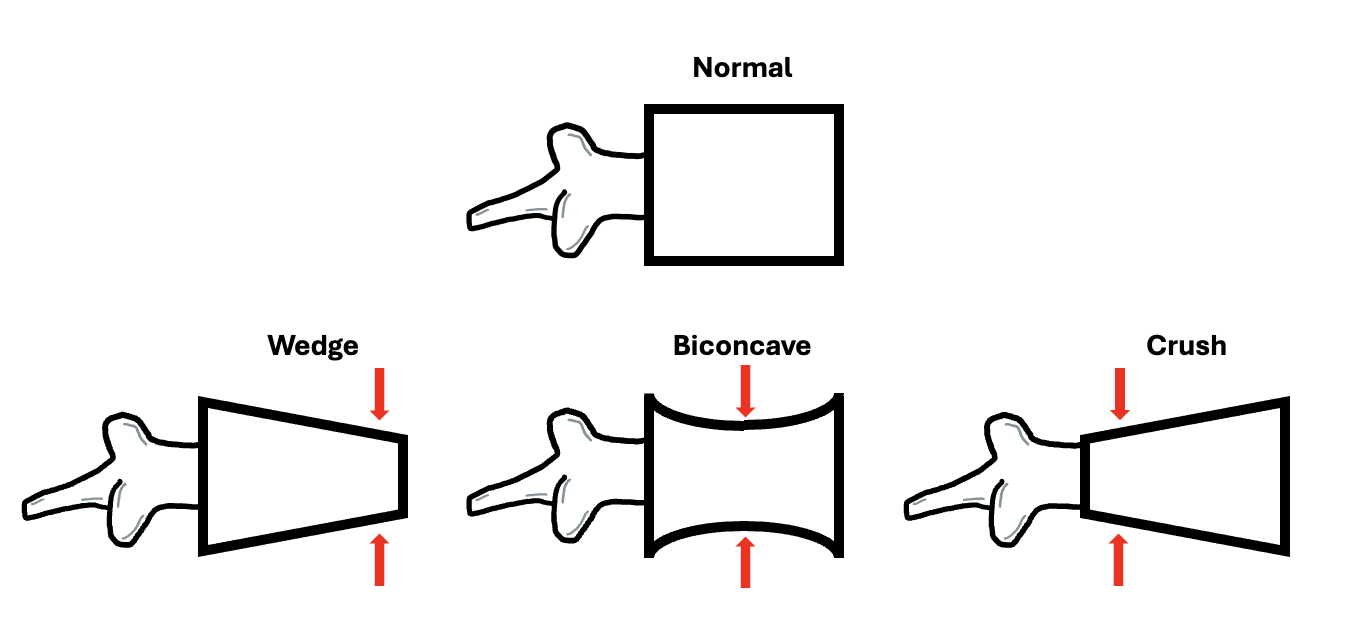
Demonstrates the different patterns seen with vertebral compression fractures: Wedge (left), Biconcave (center), Crush (right).

== Treatment ==
=== Conservative treatment ===
- Back brace for support while the bone heals; rigid braces have demonstrated pain relief for up to 6 months in acute vertebral compression fractures.
- Opioids or non-steroidal anti-inflammatory drugs (NSAIDs) for pain management, especially in the short-term setting. For osteoporotic patients, calcitonin may be helpful.

=== Surgical treatment ===
- Vertebroplasty and kyphoplasty are minimally invasive procedures that inject cement into the vertebra that is fractured. These surgeries are similar, except that kyphoplasty inserts a balloon before the cement is introduced, which can result in some vertebral height restoration. The effectiveness of these procedures is debated, but recent studies demonstrate improved pain relief and an association with decreased mortality.

Treatment goals focus on pain control, increased mobility, and restoration of functionality. Presentation and patient history can further dictate whether to pursue conservative or surgical options.

== Prevention ==
The mainstay in preventing compression fractures involves targeting the root cause, most commonly osteoporosis. Maintaining proper calcium and vitamin D levels as well as use of medications, such as bisphosphonates, can slow down bone loss. Physical activity to improve posture and mobility can also mitigate fall risk to prevent fractures.

== Possible outcomes ==
In some cases, vertebral compression fractures can lead to further complications, including deep venous thrombosis from lack of movement, bowel problems, and breathing difficulties. Rarely, Kümmel's disease, which is avascular necrosis of the vertebral body, can occur following compression fractures.

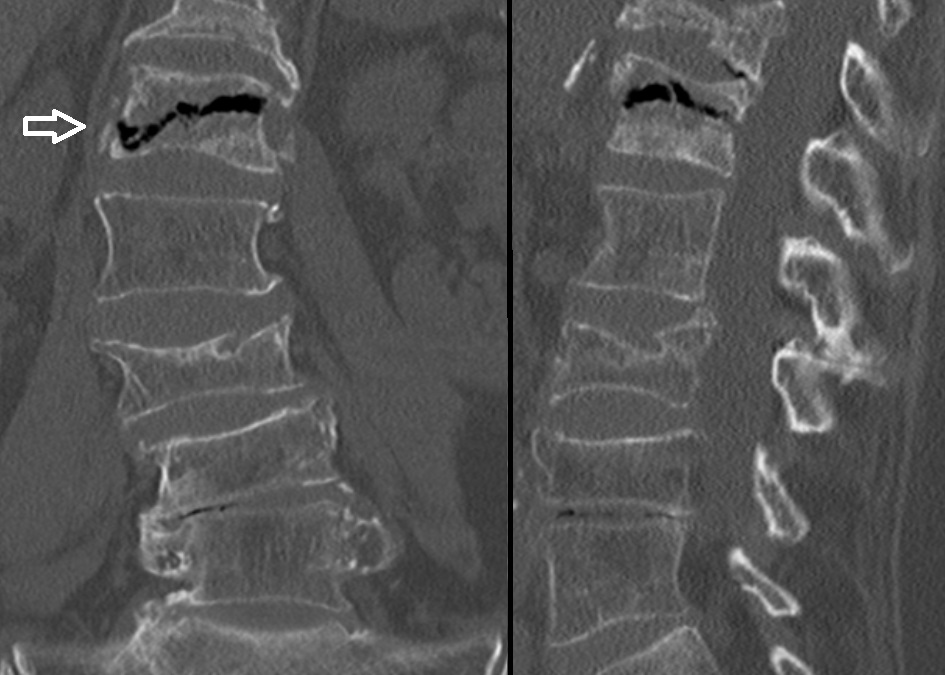
A potential complication of a vertebral compression fracture is avascular necrosis of the vertebral body, which is called Kümmel's disease, and may appear with the intravertebral vacuum cleft sign (at white arrow in image).

== Epidemiology ==
Vertebral compression fractures affect about 700,000 individuals in the United States annually, with a higher prevalence in older populations. Women are also affected more frequently than men, with about a quarter of postmenopausal women experiencing compression fractures. The thoracolumbar region tends to be where these fractures are most often located.
