= Logrolling (disambiguation) =

Logrolling is trading of favors, especially in politics.

Logrolling, log rolling, or log roll may also refer to:

- Logrolling (sport), sport involving balancing on submerged wooden logs
- A stage of log driving, literal rolling of logs
- Logrolling (medicine), moving a patient without flexing the patient's spine
- Pecan log roll, a confectionery
- Sideways roll in gymnastics
