= Grady straps =

Medical transport technique

Grady straps are a strapping configuration used in full body spinal immobilization.

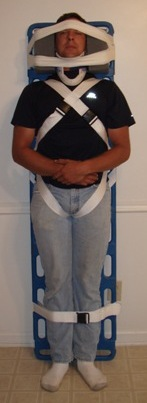
Grady Straps

== Background ==
Spine trauma and immobilization

Prehospital care providers, such as paramedics and Emergency Medical Technicians (EMTs), utilize various immobilization techniques as treatment and management of patients with definite or potential spinal trauma. Common mechanisms of spinal cord injury include motor vehicle crashes, motorcycle crashes, pedestrian-vehicle collisions, falls, blunt trauma, penetrating trauma, and diving accidents. Full body spinal immobilization is the process by which a person with obvious or suspected spinal trauma is secured to a long backboard (LBB) in a neutral in-line position. The goal of immobilization is to effectively splint the spine in order to prevent movement and additional damage to the vertebral column and spinal cord.

Immobilization equipment

A long backboard, also called a long spine board (LSB), is a reinforced, firm surface with several hand and strap holes along its lateral edges. Other immobilization equipment consists of straps, or cravats, and cervical immobilization devices (CIDs). CIDs, which stabilize the neck and reduce movement, include a soft or rigid cervical spine immobilization collar, also called a c-collar or neck brace. In addition to the c-collar, commercial head supports or substituted items, such as bulky blankets, rolled towels, or foam head blocks, are placed on each side of the head and then secured to the backboard with tape. Straps are used to secure the torso (chest and pelvis) and extremities (arms and legs) to the backboard.

Other strapping techniques

Several different strapping techniques exist for immobilizing the torso so that the thoracic, lumbar, and sacral sections of the spine are supported with spinal motion restriction. One method calls for three separate straps: one at the level of the chest, one at the hip/pelvis, and one across the legs. A revised variation of this technique uses two straps for the chest in a diagonal pattern with an additional strap below the knees. Spider straps are a commercial alternative that uses a single Velcro system with ten points of attachment.

Grady straps are a specific configuration forming a criss-cross “X” across the chest and a “V” across the pelvis in a harness-type fashion using only two long straps. This technique is highly effective for stabilizing both the upper torso (shoulders and chest) and the lower torso (pelvis). Grady straps protect against movement in all directions: up, down, left, and right, and prohibit the patient from sliding on the backboard. Because this method prevents anterior, posterior, and lateral shifts, it is very useful for high-angle rescues and awkward extrications where the backboard must be rotated sideways or tilted vertically. Grady straps are also effective in situations where the backboard must be positioned in a way other than supine, such as left lateral recumbent (or recovery position) for pregnant patients. This method also allows the backboard to be tilted in order to facilitate patient care in cases of emetic episodes where protecting the airway against aspiration is crucial. Another benefit of Grady straps is that they can be applied in a quick, timely manner which enables rapid transport for trauma patients.

Grady Emergency Medical Service in Atlanta, Georgia implemented this strapping technique. Members of the Atlanta Fire Department also utilize Grady straps. The National Association of Emergency Medical Technicians (NAEMT Website) in cooperation with The Committee on Trauma of the American College of Surgeons also recognizes the effectiveness of this technique in the Prehospital Trauma Life Support, 6th edition textbook.

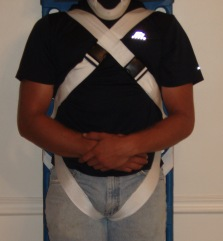
"X" and "V" Pattern

== Sources ==
- Grady Emergency Medical Service, Training and Education Department
- National Association of Emergency Medical Technicians
