= Spinal traction =

Spinal traction may refer to:

- Traction (orthopedics)
- Spinal decompression
- Spinal precautions
- Traction in spinal cord injury
