= Blount County Rescue Squad =

- Abbreviation: BCRS
- Headquarters: Alcoa, Tennessee
- Services: Emergency Medical Services, Search and Rescue, Support Services, Rescue Diver Operations
- Chief: Brian Osgood
- Deputy Chief: David Harrington
- Assistant Chief: John Whitton
- Public Information Officer: Laura Osgood
- Volunteers: 65
- Website: www.bcrs.org

The Blount County Rescue Squad, located in Alcoa, Tennessee, is a private, not-for-profit organization tasked with responding to various emergencies in Blount County, Tennessee. Part of the Tennessee Association of Rescue Squads, the Blount County Rescue Squad is staffed by trained volunteers and responds to medical emergencies, provides aid and support services to other departments serving Blount County, participates in search and rescue operations and assists with other needs when called upon.

== Services ==
The Blount County Rescue Squad responds simultaneously with American Medical Response to medical emergencies, such as injuries and sudden illnesses, and provides emergency care until more advanced personnel arrive. Most squad personnel are trained and certified as Emergency Medical Responders, however some are licensed as Emergency Medical Technicians, Advanced Emergency Medical Technicians and Paramedics.

In the event of a large incident, including but not limited to apartment fires, natural disasters, and multiple casualty incidents, the Blount County Rescue Squad provides support services to its citizens and other surrounding agencies. The support trailer is equipped with medical supplies, food, water, shelter, and other necessities. BCRS also works closely with BSORT (Blount Special Operations Team) to utilize dive search and recovery assets in maritime emergencies.

With a team of NASAR-certified search and rescue personnel, the Blount County Rescue Squad responds to incidents requiring search and rescue operations.

== Stations and Apparatus ==
The organization currently operates out of one station, its headquarters, located in Alcoa. This station is conveniently centered close to all locations within the county. While the rescue squad is primarily responsible for locations outside the corporate city limits of Alcoa and Maryville, they will respond within city limits when requested.

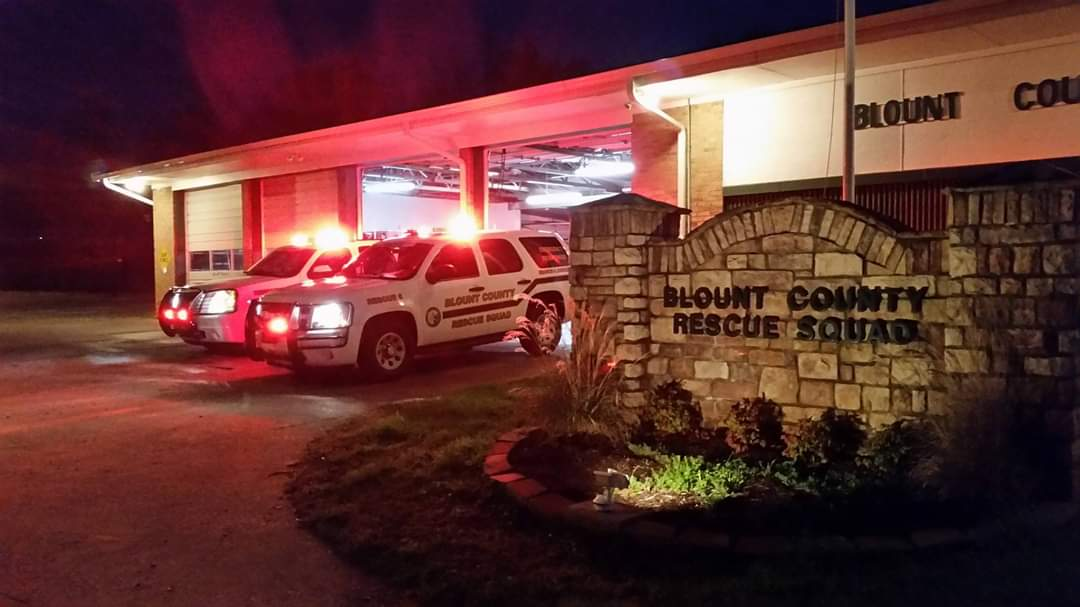

=== Apparatus ===
The headquarters houses two squad trucks, two SUVs, two boats, and one support trailer.

==== Rescue 1 (R01) ====
Rescue 1 was previously the designation of a multi-compartment, general purpose squad truck equipped with vehicle extrication tools, EMS equipment, generators, and other life-saving tools. However, as of January, 2016, the vehicle that previously held the designation Rescue 1 was sold, and a new vehicle was purchased as a replacement.

The new Rescue 1 is a small rapid response vehicle based on the 2015 Ford Explorer SUV with the police interceptor package, and is equipped for rapid response to medical emergencies. It contains an EMS jump bag, oxygen, spinal immobilization equipment, a suction unit, and Automated External Defibrillator (AED).

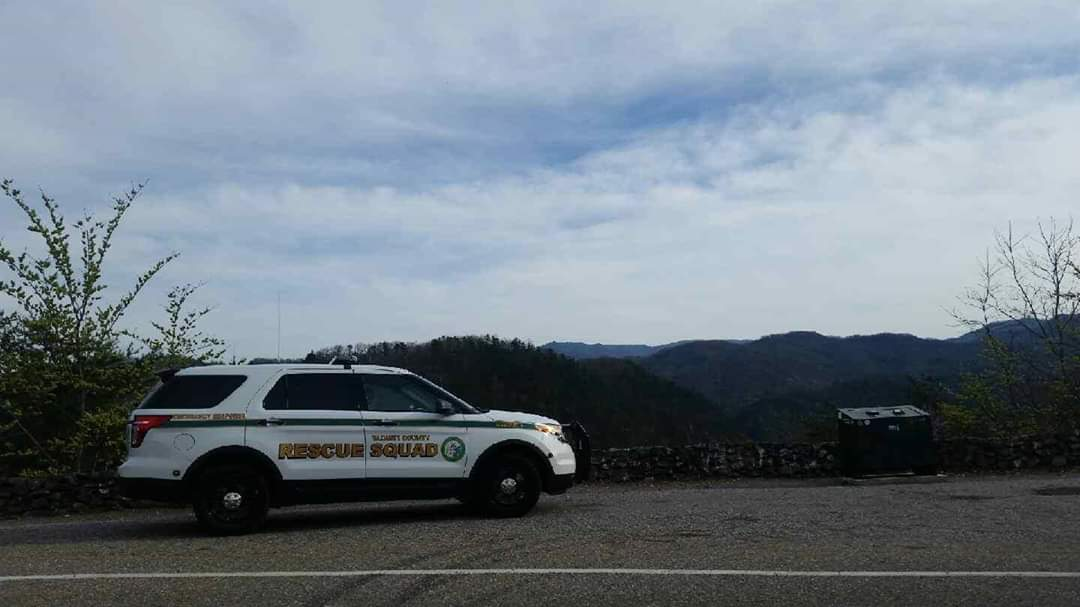

==== Rescue 2 (R02) ====
Rescue 2 is multi-compartment truck used for support and auxiliary purposes. This truck is one of the oldest, yet largest, trucks in the fleet.

==== Rescue 6 (R06) ====
Rescue 6 is a quick response SUV, used mostly for emergency medical response. Like all other vehicles, this SUV is packed with essential EMS equipment, such as a basic life support ("jump") bag, oxygen equipment, spinal immobilization equipment, a suction unit, and an AED.

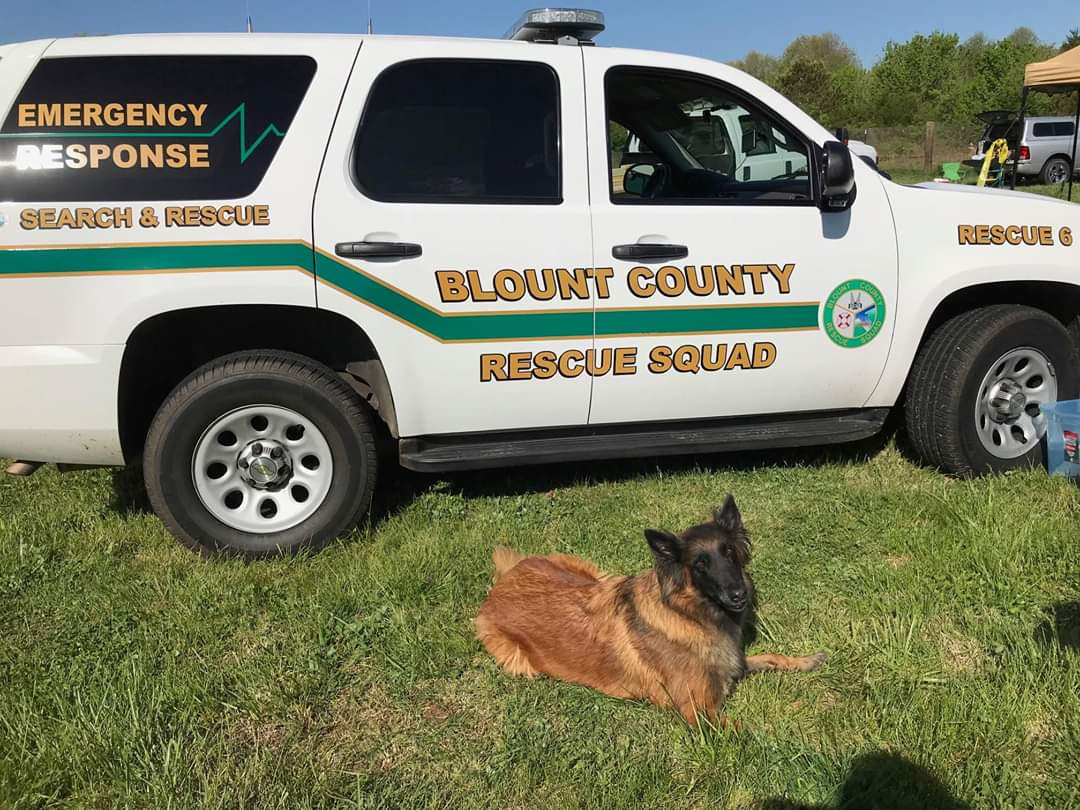

==== Rescue 7 (R07) ====
Rescue 7 is another quick response SUV. Unlike Rescue 6, Rescue 7 is more equipped and capable for wilderness search and rescue. This vehicle contains a built-in platform with a stokes basket, pre-rigged rope rescue system and manual extrication tools, providing rescuers with tools and equipment that assist students in accessing and extracting patients.

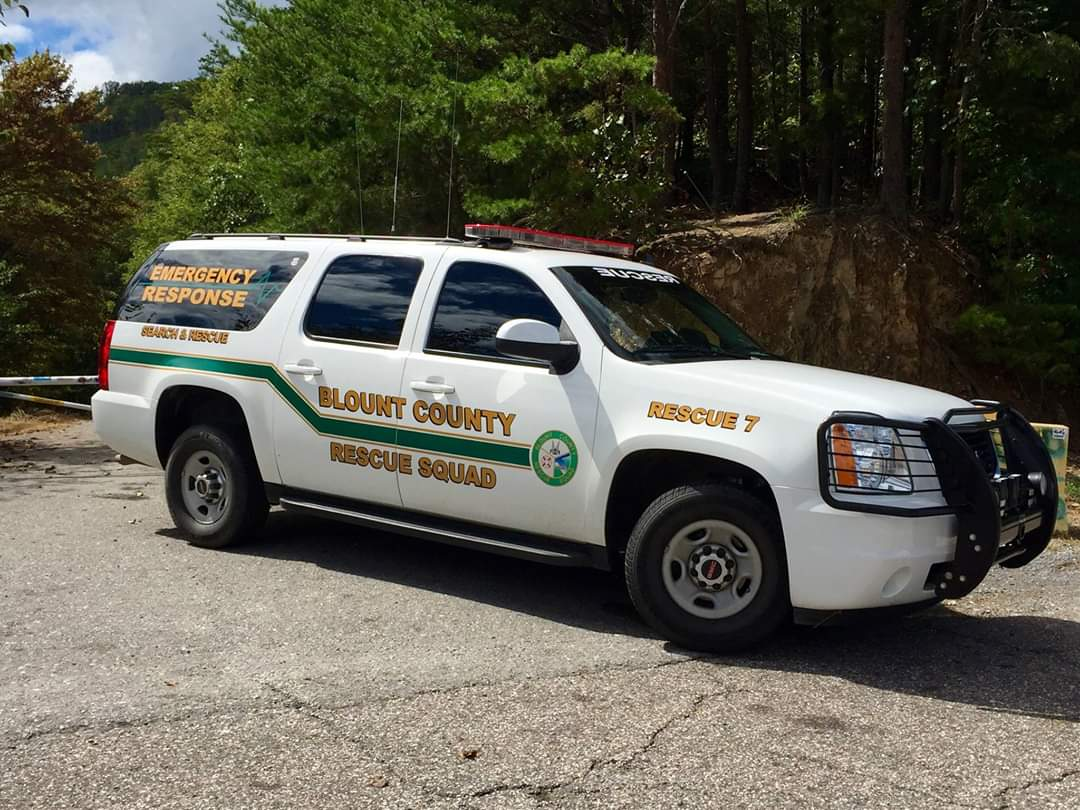

Additional Equipment

In addition to standard emergency response vehicles, BCRS also utilizes several other types of rescue apparatus such as ATV’s and marine assets used in support of BSORT operations.

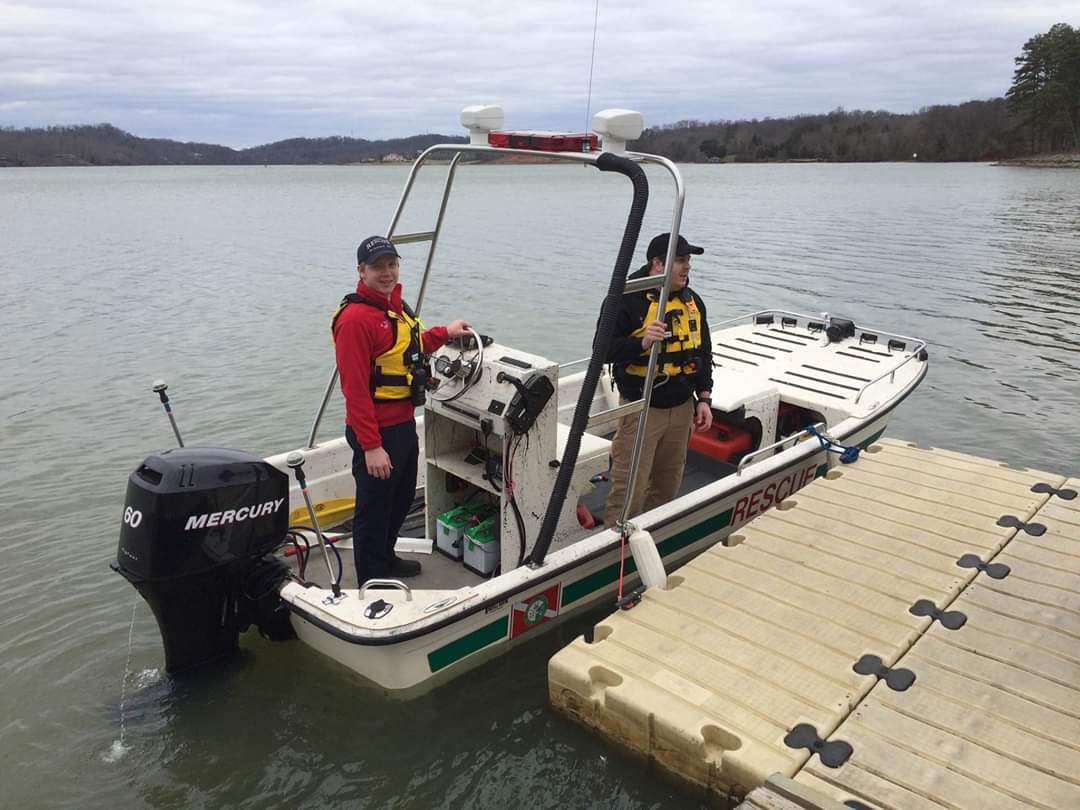

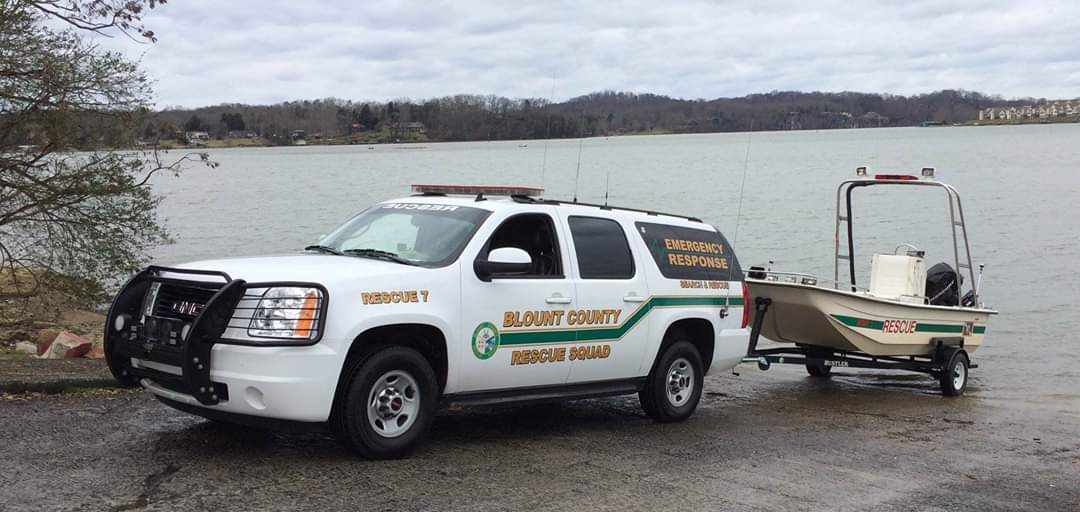

== The Dragon ==
In a collaborative effort and agreement with American Medical Response, the Blount County Rescue Squad staffs U.S Route 129 infamously known as the Tail of the Dragon by motorcycle enthusiasts, during the Spring, Summer, and Fall seasons. This curvy, two-lane stretch of highway encompasses the Tennessee-North Carolina border alongside the Appalachian Mountains through Deal's Gap. Due to the hazardous conditions this highway presents to motorists, accidents frequently occur. To reduce response times and increase survival rates, Blount County Rescue Squad personnel dedicate their time to establish their presence on the Dragon.

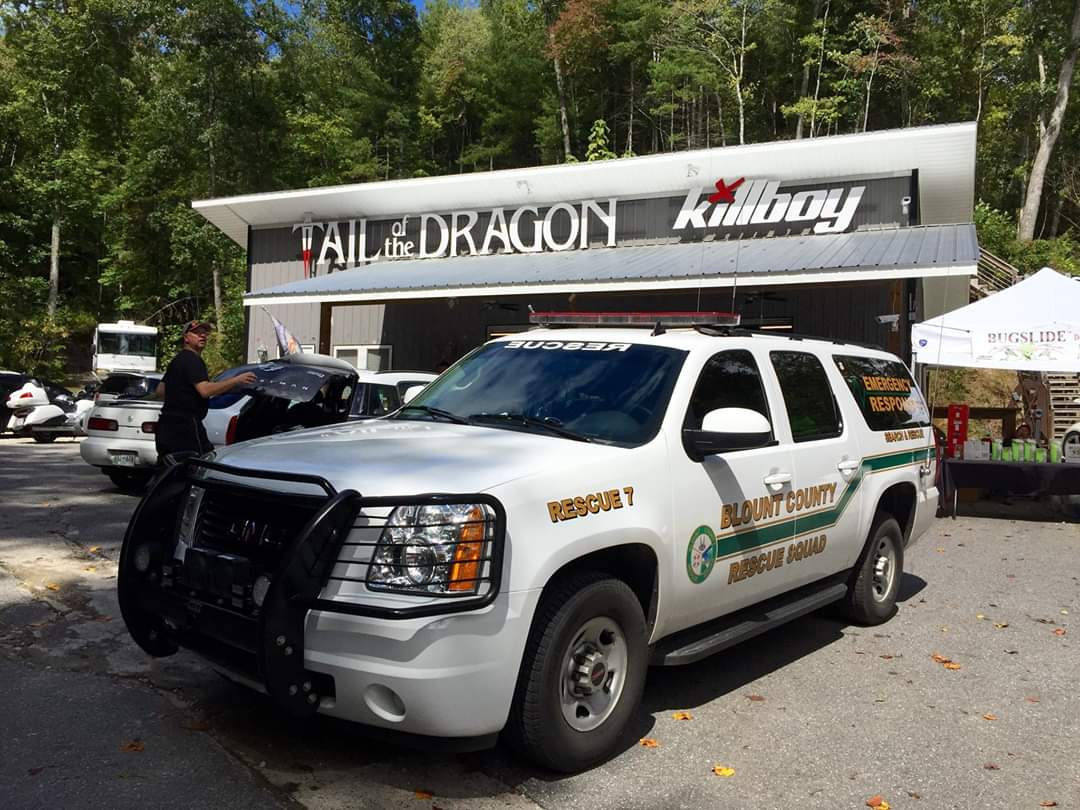
