= Helmet-to-helmet collision =

Dangerous contact in gridiron football

Helmet-to-helmet collisions are occurrences in gridiron football when two players' football helmets make head-to-head contact with a high degree of force. Intentionally causing a helmet-to-helmet collision is a penalty in most football leagues, including many high school leagues.

Despite its long association with American football, this type of contact is now considered to be dangerous play by league authorities due to the potential of causing serious injury. Major football leagues, such as the National Football League (NFL), Canadian Football League (CFL), and NCAA, have taken a tougher stance on helmet-to-helmet collisions after the US Congress launched an investigation into the effects repeated concussions have on football players and the new discoveries of chronic traumatic encephalopathy (CTE). Other possible injuries include head traumas, spinal cord injuries, and even death. Helmet manufacturers are constantly improving their designs in order to best protect their users against injuries from such collisions.

The crackdown on helmet-to-helmet collisions has resulted in reappraisals of the sport. An image of two helmets smashing together—which had been a staple for 20 years—was dropped in 2006 from Monday Night Football on ESPN. The NFL also ordered Toyota to stop using a similar helmet collision in its advertisements.

== Rules by league ==
=== Canadian Football League ===
The Canadian Football League prohibits the use of the helmet to butt, ram, or spear an opponent. Players are penalized for what is not deemed to be an 'acceptable' football play.

=== National Collegiate Athletic Association ===
In the NCAA, helmet-to-helmet collisions have been banned for years, but they were illegal only when intentional. In 2005, the NCAA took the word "intentional" out of the rules in hopes of reducing these incidents even further. Beginning with the 2013 season, players who are flagged for such hits are automatically ejected from the game in addition to a 15-yard penalty, under the new "targeting" rule, subject to a replay review. If the ejection occurred in the second half or in overtime, the player must also sit out the first half of his team's next scheduled game. This rule was revised in 2014 to overturn the yardage penalty in addition to the ejection if the player's hit is not flagrant. The rule was again revised in 2016 to allow replay officials to call penalties if they were missed by on-field officials and overturn incorrect penalties.

The NCAA is currently proposing to modify the policy again to allow players to remain in the game if there is insufficient evidence for replay officials to confirm or overturn a call, but the 15 yard penalty would still be enforced. Beginning with the 2019 season, players who are penalized for three or more targeting fouls in the same season will receive a one-game suspension in addition to any ejection penalties.

=== National Football League ===
As of 1996, the NFL implemented a rule change that banned helmet-to-helmet hits initiated by defenders with their helmet or targeted at the head of an offensive player. It introduced a penalty, personal foul misconduct, and resulted in a 15-yard penalty and fines from the NFL. In 2002, the NFL added to the rule, making a helmet-to-helmet hit to a quarterback after a turnover illegal. Seven years later, the NFL created penalties for blockers. The penalty states that any contact made with the helmet or neck of an opponent during blind-side blocks, whether by helmet, forearm, or shoulder, would result in a personal foul.

In 2010, the NFL placed its policies pertaining to these incidents under review, considering heavy fines and suspensions. In 2017, the NFL adopted the NCAA's "targeting" rules, which will not only penalize players, but will review the play and automatically throw any offenders out from the game. The first suspension under this rule occurred on December 13, 2011: James Harrison received a single game's suspension after such a hit caused Cleveland Browns quarterback Colt McCoy to suffer a concussion.

According to the NFL's Use of Helmet Rule Sheet, players may also be ejected as a result of helmet-to-helmet hits. Some of the ejection standards include: if a player lowers his helmet to establish a linear body posture prior to initiate and make contact with the helmet, has an unobstructed path to his opponent, and when contact is clearly avoidable and the player delivers the blow when he has other options.

== Opposition to helmet-to-helmet collision bans ==
Despite the safety concerns, in 2010, some professional football players criticized bans on helmet-to-helmet collisions on the basis that gridiron football is a game that is supposed to be composed of the world's biggest and best athletes, and placing such restrictions "waters down" the game.

== Effects ==
Helmet-to-helmet collisions can cause major problems on and off the field. The main effect of helmet to helmet collisions is concussions. There are about 3.8 million sports related concussions in the United States every year, but up to half of them are not reported. Experiencing a concussion increases one's likelihood of getting another. Head-to-head collisions and resulting concussions may occur in a variety of sports, including football, hockey and lacrosse.

== See also ==
- Concussions in American football
- Concussions in sport
- Health issues in American football
- Helmet removal (sports)
- Impact monitor
- Bounty Bowl
- New Orleans Saints bounty scandal
- Chronic traumatic encephalopathy
- National Operating Committee on Standards for Athletic Equipment
- List of NFL players with chronic traumatic encephalopathy
