= Helmet removal (sports) =

Emergency medical procedure

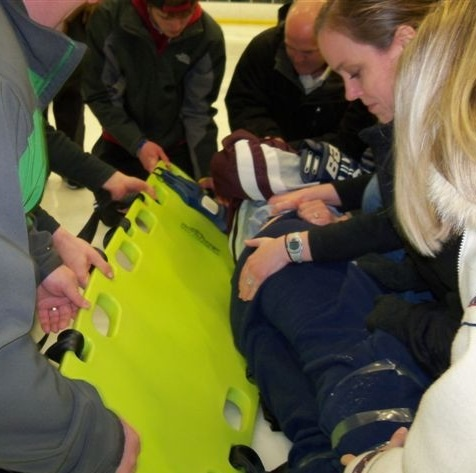
Spine board being positioned under injured hockey player in a practice drill

In sports medicine, helmet removal is the practice of removing the helmet of someone who has just experienced a sports injury in order to better facilitate first aid. Helmets are usually removed following an injury to the head or neck.

Administering first aid can be more challenging if the athlete's airway has been compromised. In such a situation, responders must consider the possibility of the athlete's injury being worsened or its effects being made permanent.

Paradoxically, the equipment designed to prevent or mitigate injury, such as helmets, face masks, neck rolls, and shoulder pads, may hinder first aid operations by complicating the steps that responders need to take.

Finally, environmental challenges, such as the difficulty of first responders moving on an ice arena, or maneuvering an ambulance through inadequate access routes, will add to the problem if not previously addressed by inspection of facilities and, in the best circumstances, rehearsal.

== Potential for inadvertent injury ==
The consequence of injury to the nerve cord is, in the worst of circumstances, quadriplegia. This is an inappropriate time for practice conflicts to arise and the potential is real, although the less so the more organized the situation. For example, Emergency Medical Technicians (EMTs) and Paramedics are trained to remove helmets while athletic training staff and the NCAA believe that the helmet should be left in place, unless the athlete's airway is compromised and cannot be managed otherwise.

This potential conflict relates to the design of the helmet used in the situation to which each of the parties most frequently responds. With EMTs and paramedics, it is most often motor vehicle accidents. With athletic training staff, it is exclusively athletic events unless acting in the role of 'Good Samaritan'. Helmets worn by motorcyclists and four-wheel operators are usually of an integral design making removal of the face mask either impossible or extremely difficult. Consequently, management of a compromised airway demands removal of the helmet.

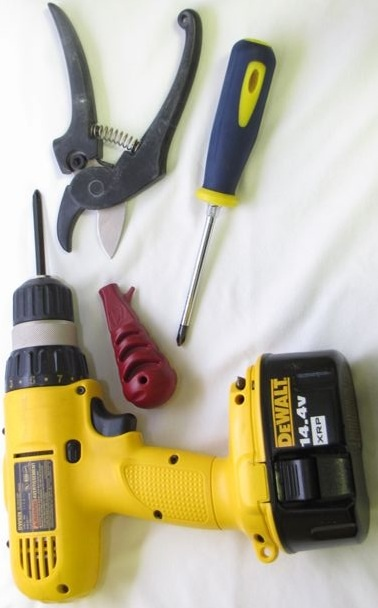
Removal tools

On the other hand, helmets worn in football and ice hockey, are designed specifically so that the face mask may be quickly removed, although the technique for its removal will vary by helmet design. Accordingly, potential and serious difference in practice should be avoided by good communication between athletic training staff and first responders prior to the start of the event. Certified athletic training staff are familiar with the helmet model currently in use by their athletes, are expert in its removal, and carry the equipment needed to do so, and there is no substitute for familiarity and practice. At the same time, investigation and development of improved, face mask release systems is ongoing.

The National Collegiate Athletic Association in its advice to athletic trainers and team physicians, contained in the NCAA Sports Medicine Handbook, advises that the helmet should never be removed from an injured athlete, conscious or unconscious, with a suspected or potential head or neck injury during pre-hospital management. In this advice, certain assumptions are made. The first is that the facemask can be removed so that airway care, if needed, can be carried out. The second is that the helmet fits securely so that supporting the helmet will support the athlete's head and neck. The advice accepts that helmet removal may be necessary if an ill-fitting helmet prevents the head and neck from being secured safely for emergency transport. It is also accepted that helmet removal may be necessary if, for some reason or another, the facemask cannot be removed in a reasonable time. There is general agreement that should helmet removal be required, it should only be carried out by trained personnel. The NCAA also asserts that the injured athlete should be maneuvered to a spine board for transport as a 'single unit' using a lift/slide maneuver or log-roll technique.

== Face mask removal ==
With agreement on the importance in maintaining cervical spine alignment, and by implication, the most common strategy of leaving the helmet and shoulder pads in place, the immediate task falls into two parts:

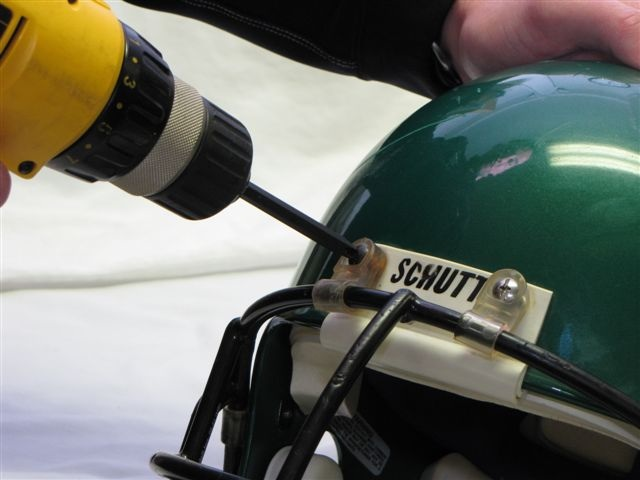
Face mask being unscrewed

1. the coordinated, synchronized log roll of an injured athlete who happens to be lying in the face down or prone position;
2. removal of the face mask to allow care and protection of the airway.

Currently, face masks fall into two broad categories, the 'traditional', secured by screws and plastic loops or thin wire ties and a combination of screws and T-nuts, and the 'innovative' using some additional type of proprietary 'quick release' hardware. However, it should be recognized that helmet and face mask design is an area of active development and change.

Whichever, removal customarily involves cutting/releasing the loop straps and various tools have been advocated including cutting tools and cordless screwdrivers. In some studies, the cordless screwdriver has been shown to be the most efficient and quickest.

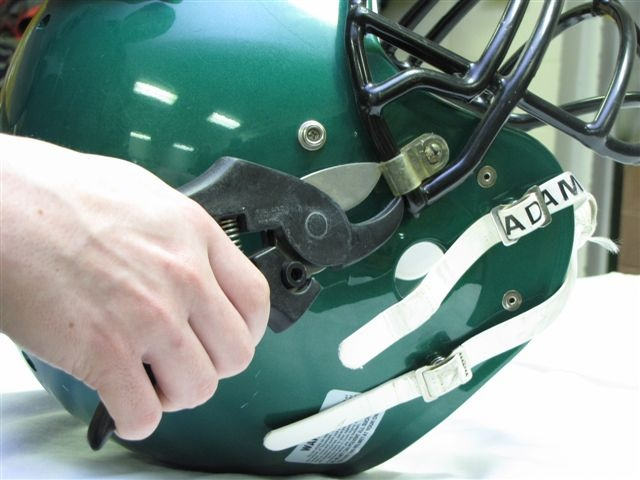
Face mask loops being cut

However, concern has been raised concerning the use of a single technique when helmet fittings have been degraded by poor maintenance. In those circumstances, a screw seized with rust, or in which the threads have been stripped, may be encountered. Accordingly, there has been advocacy for a reliable, combined, tool technique such as a cordless screwdriver with backup cutting tool. Moreover, in some innovative designs, a cutting tool is essential.

In general, 'quick release' face-mask attachments appear to make face-mask removal quicker and cause less unwanted movement of the athlete's head or neck. The opposite is the case in cutting loop straps.

== Helmet removal ==
At some stage, the helmet and protective equipment will need to be removed. How this may be done with minimum risk remains a question of importance.

First, there are three possible athlete/equipment configurations:

- no helmet and no shoulder pads;
- both helmet and shoulder pads;
- helmet only without shoulder pads.

Of the three options, the least desirable appears to be helmet removal with shoulder pads retained (third choice), that combination potentially allowing the head to drop back in relation to the shoulders inducing the greatest amount of movement (extension) of the cervical spine.

It was also previously held that X-ray of the neck should be carried out before movement of the neck was permitted. Since retention of helmet and shoulder pads would be the least disruptive to the neck as previously observed, the second question to arise became the reliability of what is referred to as cross-table lateral X-ray of the neck, the routine radiologic procedure in such cases. Although previously regarded as standard procedure, at least one study has found that football equipment is an impediment to accurate X-ray interpretation. In those with significant trauma X-ray computed tomography is a more accurate test.

Current opinion now suggests that X-ray of the cervical spine adds little to what can be obtained by clinical examination and two clinical assessment strategies have been validated, the first being the National Emergency X-Radiography Utilization Study (NEXUS) and the second, the Canadian C-Spine Rule (CCR). The first has a reported sensitivity for detecting cervical spine injury of 99% and the second, if anything, higher.

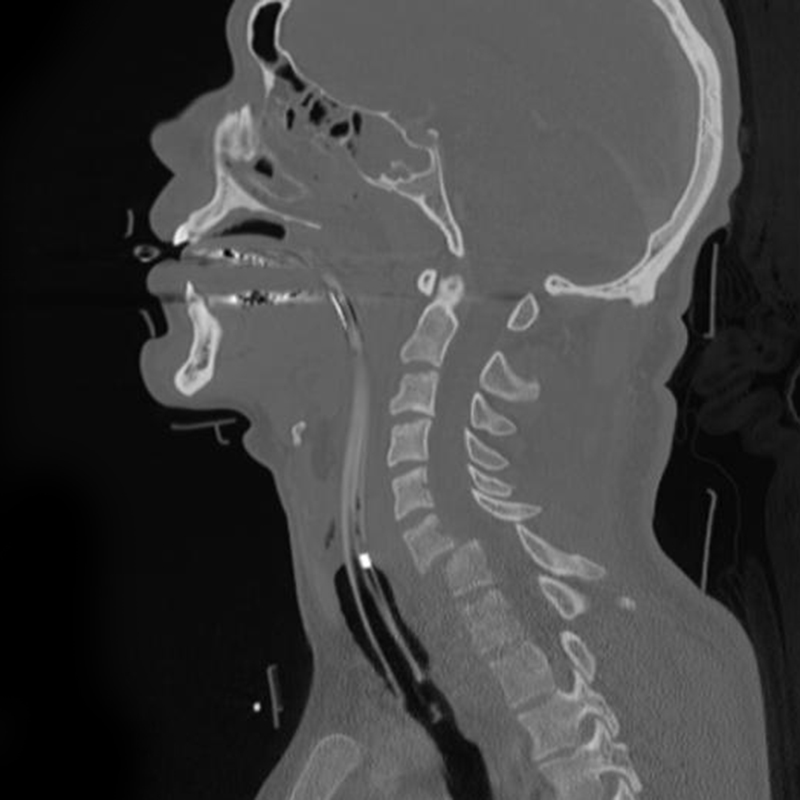
Fracture dislocation of cervical spine.

Accordingly, a practice has arisen that "clears" the patient from cervical spinal injury if the following criteria are met:

1. the subject is alert and oriented;
2. has a normal neurological examination;
3. has no concurrent injury that would distract him/her from full cooperation;
4. is free from pain when the cervical spine is carefully palpated;
5. is free from pain on flexing and extension of the cervical spine.

Since the last part of the exam requires removal of cervical restraints such as collars and attachments to spinal boards etc., the implication is that it is 'safe' to remove such restraints if the first four criteria are satisfied.

In the event that application of the above criteria fails to indicate a 'normal cervical spine', the next step currently is CT examination, which has a reported 98-99% sensitivity for cervical spinal injury. A separate imaging technique, magnetic resonance imaging, has been found to be too prone to artifacts from parts of the protective equipment to be clinically useful.

It should be understood that, apart from the clinical examination rules and CT, the majority of sports or athletic information has been derived from studies involving football, ice hockey, and motorcycle accidents. This induces an age (late adolescence and young adult) and sex (mainly male) bias. Consequently, caution should be used in applying the conclusions to injuries involving the use of helmets of other design such as those used in lacrosse, horseback riding, baseball/softball, or cycling. They also cannot necessarily be applied to a younger or female population without caution.
