= Health issues in American football =

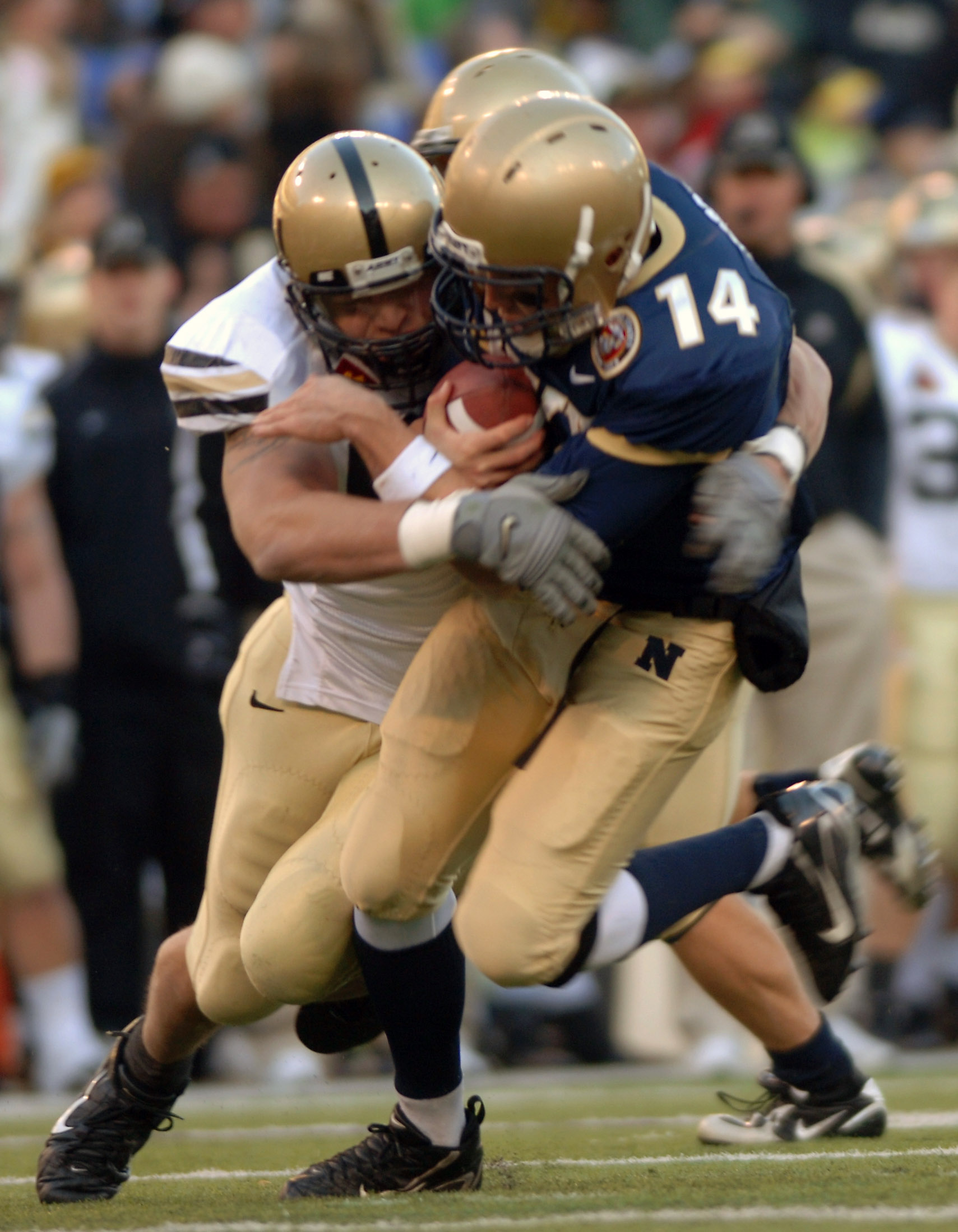
An example of a helmet-to-helmet collision, a common cause for concussions

There are a large number of health risks associated with participating in American football. Injuries are relatively common, due to its nature as a full-contact game, and may occur during both games and practice. Several factors can affect the frequency of injuries: epidemiological studies have shown older players can be at a greater risk, while equipment and experienced coaches can reduce the risk of injury. Common injuries include strains, sprains, fractures, dislocations, and concussions. Concussions have become a concern, as they increase the risk of mental illnesses like dementia and chronic traumatic encephalopathy (CTE). In individual leagues like the National Football League (NFL) and National Collegiate Athletic Association (NCAA), a public injury report is published containing all injured players on a team, their injury and the game-day status of each player.

Catastrophic injuries—defined as serious injury to the spine, spinal cord, or brain—and fatalities are uncommon in football; both have become less common since the 1970s, although a small number of them still occur each year. Both concussions and catastrophic injuries can be caused by helmet-to-helmet collisions as well as impact against the ground or other players' knees; in other cases, they can be caused by players who have sustained a head injury returning to play, which can place the player at risk of sustaining a severe injury. Despite the decrease in catastrophic injuries, a greater number of NFL players have reported major injuries and shortened careers since the 1970s, in part due to the increasing size and speed of players and the use of artificial turf.

In many cases, injuries sustained while playing can cause long-term damage. In addition to neurological damage caused by hits to the head, injuries to the mid and lower body can force players to retire or lead to nagging ailments in later life. Various methods have been used to reduce injuries in football, including rule changes such as the abolition of large wedge formations; a sharp decline in cervical spine injuries since the 1970s has been attributed to rule changes that altered blocking and tackling techniques. More recently, rule changes to protect players from head injuries have been instituted. Equipment like the football helmet and pads are used to give players a level of protection from injuries, while other factors such as cleat size are used to minimize the risk of injuries due to field condition.

== Injuries ==
Most common injuries in American football
Injury	Percentage of all injuries
Strains and sprains	40%
Bruises	25%
Dislocations	15%
Fractures	10%
Concussions	5%

Because American football is a full-contact sport, head injuries are relatively common. According to the San Francisco Spine Institute at Seton Medical Center in Daly City, California, up to 1.5 million young men participate in football annually, and there are an estimated 1.2 million football-related injuries per year. An estimated 51% of injuries occur during training sessions, while 49% occur elsewhere. Injuries are nearly 5 times more likely to happen during contact training sessions than in controlled, non-contact sessions. Older players are at the most risk for injuries, while teams with experienced coaches and more assistant coaches are less likely to experience injuries. 50% of injuries occur in the lower extremities (with knee injuries alone counting for roughly 36% of all injuries) and 30% occur in the upper extremities.

The most common types of injuries are strains, sprains, bruises, fractures, dislocations, and concussions. According to the NFL Physicians Society, the most common injuries in football are "concussions, blunt injuries to the chest such as cardiac contusions, pulmonary contusions, broken ribs, abdominal injuries, splenic lacerations and kidney injuries." Orthopedic injuries to the knee, foot, ankle, shoulder, neck and back are also common, as are muscle strains to the hamstrings, quads, calves and the abdomen.

Concussions are particularly concerning, as repeated concussions may increase a person's risk in later life for chronic traumatic encephalopathy (CTE) and mental health issues such as dementia, Parkinson's disease, and depression. Concussions are often caused by helmet-to-helmet collisions, impact against the ground or other players' knees, and upper-body contact between opposing players. However, helmets have prevented more serious injuries such as skull fractures. Cervical spine injuries can be catastrophic, but have sharply declined since the mid-1970s due to rule changes and improved workout regimes, equipment, and coaching.

Performance-enhancing drugs (PEDs) are an issue in both high-school and professional-level football. Steroid use has been linked to an increased risk for musculoskeletal injuries among players. Human growth hormone (HGH) is used by some players to improve performance, recover from injuries, decrease aging, and to lose weight. Although none of these uses are scientifically proven or legal, HGH places users at risk for adverse side effects such as onset of diabetes and negatively impacting joints and organs such as the heart. However, there have been no studies of HGH use or the baseline levels of the hormone in NFL athletes. NFL players are routinely subject to drug tests in accordance with the NFL's two substance policies. Players found using performance-enhancing drugs, including anabolic steroids, can face suspension and other penalties. As of 2014, the league does not test for HGH use among players.

=== National Football League ===
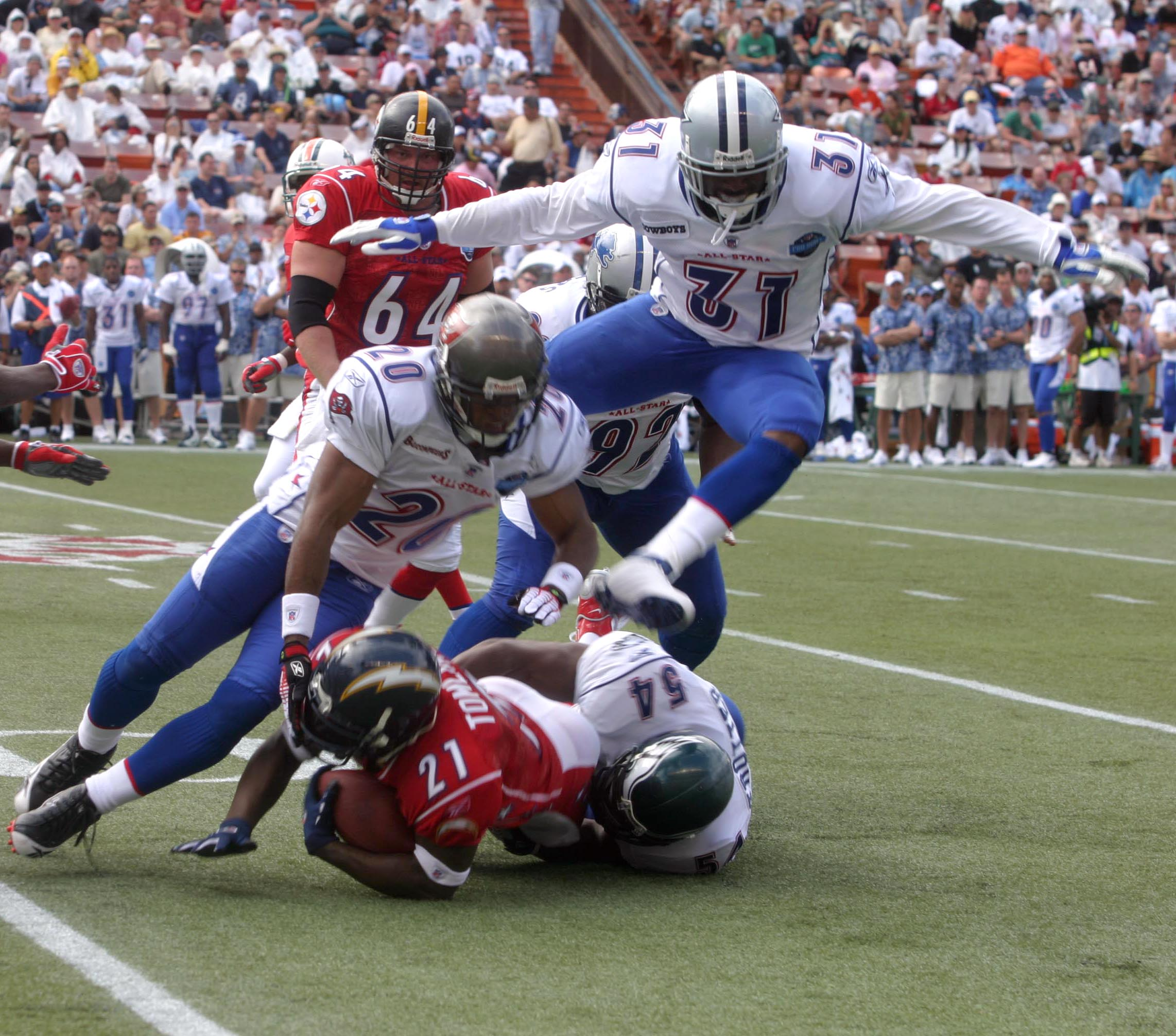
Tackles are one of the leading causes of injuries in American football.

An injury report section is common in the sports sections of American newspapers, detailing injuries for each team and the amount of time each injured player is expected to be out. The injury report was created to prevent gamblers from gaining inside information about injuries from players, and as a result, NFL teams must report on the status of injured players on a set schedule during the season. The standard severity descriptions are "out" (will not play in the upcoming game); "doubtful" (25% chance of playing); "questionable" (50% chance of playing); or "probable" (75% chance of playing). Teams have been known to downplay, exaggerate or overly detail their teams' injuries in an attempt to confuse or mislead upcoming opponents. Injured players may be placed on one of several injured lists, including the Physically Unable to Perform (PUP) list. If a player is injured in an event outside of a game or team practice, or during collegiate practice prior to being drafted, he is eligible for the Nonfootball Injury list. Players who have sustained major injuries and are not expected to play for the rest of the season may be placed on the Injured Reserve (IR) list. These players do not count towards the teams' roster limit.

Aside from concussions, orthopedic injuries are among the most common in the National Football League. These injuries consist of trauma such as tears in the achilles, anterior cruciate ligament (ACL), and patellar tendon. A study was done by the Feinberg School of Medicine and Northwestern University, where they studied the "return to play rate" (RTP) for given orthopedic procedures done based on a given injury. They found that out of 559 NFL players, the most difficult injuries for NFL players to return to play in were patellar tendon tears (50.0 %) and achilles tears (72.5%).

=== College and high school football ===
According to the College Football Assistance Fund, over 20,000 injuries occur from college football each year. The National Collegiate Athletic Association (NCAA) maintains an injury list similar to that used by the NFL – injured players are listed as "Out", "Doubtful", "Questionable", or "Probable", but suspended players are also included on the list. College players are limited to four years of eligibility, but can receive a medical redshirt that lets them play another year if they have suffered a season-ending injury and have not played in more than 30% of the season's games.

=== Brain injury ===
Reported concussion rate per 10,000 athletic exposures (high school)
Sport	Boys	Girls
American football	11.2	N/A
Lacrosse	6.9	5.2
Soccer	4.2	6.7
Wrestling	6.2	N/A
Basketball	2.8	5.6
Field hockey	N/A	4.2
Baseball/Softball	1.2	1.6

In 1994, the NFL established the Mild Traumatic Brain Injury Committee (MTBI), which was later replaced by the Head, Neck and Spine Committee, to study concussions and brain injuries in professional football players. The committee and its leadership, including Ira Casson and Elliot Pellman, were criticized by former players for stating that there is not enough research to determine if concussions lead to permanent brain injury. Pellman, who served as chairman of the committee from 1994 to 2007, received a large amount of criticism because he did not have a background in neurology and the research he published on brain injuries disagreed with the findings of independent scientists. In 2009, an NFL-commissioned report showed increased incidence of diagnosis of memory loss and dementia among retired professional football players when compared to the general population. The study also indicated that these symptoms were related to the effects of concussions. However, the NFL and the report's own researchers questioned the reliability of some of the data-gathering methods employed by the study, including the fact that the study was conducted by phone. The same year, the committee acknowledged for the first time that concussions can lead to long-term brain injuries. A Congressional hearing in October 2009, as well as pressure from the National Football League Players Association (NFLPA), led to an overhaul of the concussion policy in November and December of that year.

NFL commissioner Roger Goodell addressed the issue of head injuries in professional football during a talk held on November 15, 2012, at the Harvard School of Public Health. In the talk, he highlighted the NFL's efforts to reduce head injuries by enacting measures such as penalizing hits to the head, better assessing concussions on the sideline, and removing players from the game after they have been diagnosed or suspected of having sustained a concussion. He also discussed the need for increased research on brain injuries and long-term disorders, and called for a culture change in the league, saying that players need to be more willing to acknowledge their injuries to medical staff. In September 2012 the league pledged a $30 million donation to the National Institutes of Health to research the connection between brain injuries and long-term mental health issues. Beginning in 2012 the NFL was the subject of several lawsuits initiated by former players who alleged that the league withheld information and misled players about the potential long-term impacts of head injuries. Six of the lawsuits were approved to be tried together. In August 2013 the NFL reached a settlement with more than 4,500 former players, agreeing to pay $765 million to be used to pay for medical examinations for former NFL players and for research and education purposes. Additionally, the funds will also be used to compensate former players who are determined to have significant cognitive impairment.

Self Reported Concussions among NCAA Student Athletes
Sport	One	Multiple	None
Women's Ice Hockey	20.9	8.3	70.8
Men's Wrestling	19.5	8.2	72.3
Men's Ice Hockey	18.6	7.1	74.3
American football	17.9	9.5	72.6
Men's Lacrosse	17.8	7.8	74.4

Concussions are also an issue in non-professional football. In a 2010 study by Purdue University and Indiana University, an estimated 43,000 to 67,000 football players suffer a concussion every season. However, because many injuries go unreported, the true number may exceed 100,000. The study, "Functionally-Detected Cognitive Impairment in High School Football Players Without Clinically Diagnosed Concussion", was published in 2013 in the Journal of Neurotrauma and observed 21 high school players throughout a season; it determined that even players who would not be diagnosed with a concussion based on their symptoms can display notable impairments via MRIs and verbal or cognitive testing, indicating that the current tests used on the sideline to assess concussions may not be adequate. A 2013 study by the National Academy of Sciences found that concussion rates in college football exceed those in any other sport, and that high school players have twice the risk of sustaining a concussion as collegiate players. The study found that, as reported by athletic trainers, college football players sustain 6.3 concussions for every 10,000 athletic exposures (meaning an individual practice or game), and the rate for high school football players is 11.2. The high school concussion figure is nearly double that of the next-highest sport, lacrosse. The study, funded by a $75,000 donation from the NFL to the Centers for Disease Control Foundation, also found that there is no evidence that newer helmet technology decreases the risk for concussions.

According to 2017 study on brains of deceased gridiron football players, 99% of tested brains of NFL players, 88% of CFL players, 64% of semi-professional players, 91% of college football players, and 21% of high school football players had various stages of CTE.

=== Catastrophic injuries and fatalities ===
Deaths caused directly by football
Years	Sandlot	High school	College	Pro/semi-pro
1931–69	150	428	63	74
1970–79	15	119	12	1
1980–89	7	59	5	0
1990–99	1	33	5	0
2000–09	5	35	1	3
2010–12	2	4	3	2

Catastrophic injuries are not common in American football. According to the National Center for Catastrophic Sport Injury Research, there were 468 non-fatal injuries resulting in permanent neurological damage across all high school sports in the United States from 1982 to 2011. In football, catastrophic injuries are rare but are devastating when they occur. The rate of catastrophic head injuries has remained low since the introduction of the modern football helmet in the 1970s, but rates of injury are much higher at the high school level than the college level. A 2007 study found that, in high school and college football, there are an average of 7.23 catastrophic head injuries per year: there were 0.67 injuries per 100,000 high school players and 0.21 injuries per 100,000 college players. Over a 13-year period from September 1989 to June 2002, there were 94 players who sustained catastrophic head injuries—8 of these players died as a result of the injury, 46 sustained permanent neurological damage, and 36 made a full recovery. 56% of these players had a history of head injuries, 71% of them occurring in the same season as their catastrophic injury, and most of the catastrophic injuries resulted from being tackled or making a tackle. The study recommended that players exhibiting neurological symptoms should be strongly discouraged from returning to play.

The medical costs for catastrophic injuries can be extremely high—a 2011 estimate from the National Spinal Cord Injury Statistical Center notes that first-year costs of someone who has high tetraplegia, an injury that causes partial or full loss of use in all limbs, is USD $1,044,097, with subsequent years costing $181,328. Many high schools across the United States require students to have an insurance policy, while others offer supplementary insurance to help offset the cost; some schools also request that boosters help families pay for these policies.

Catastrophic injuries have been on a steady decline since the 1960s, due in part to rules banning dangerous forms of contact such as spearing, face tackling and butt blocking. However, catastrophic injuries are still caused by helmet-to-helmet collisions, as well when players hit their heads against an opposing player's knee or the ground. Returning to play after sustaining a head injury earlier in the game also places players at risk for an even more severe injury. Many states are requiring teams to prevent players who have shown any signs of a concussion from returning to a game, while other steps such as more aggressive enforcement of safety rules and better condition of the neck muscles have been suggested. Additionally, coaches are being urged to train players to block with their shoulders instead of their heads.

Fatalities in football are rare. A 2013 study of high school and college football players split fatalities into two types: direct fatalities, defined as those caused by "trauma from participation in a sport resulting in a brain injury, cervical fracture, or intra-abdominal injury" and indirect fatalities, defined as those resulting from external factors such as "cardiac failure, heat illness, sickle cell trait [SCT], asthma, or pulmonary embolism". The study found that, on average, there are 4 direct fatalities and 8.2 indirect fatalities among high school and college players per year, making indirect fatalities more than twice as common as direct fatalities.

== Effects on post-career life ==
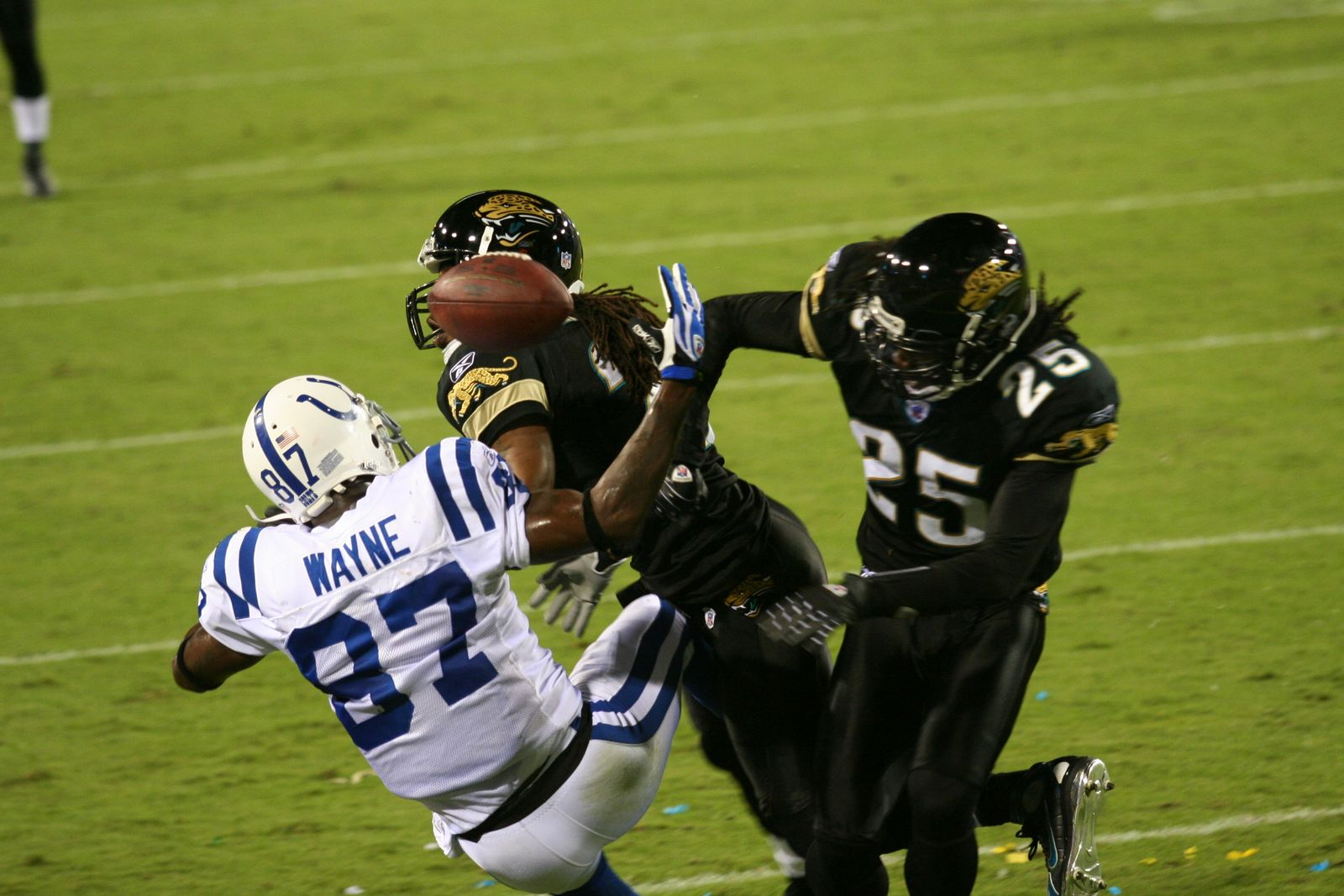
Speed players, such as the wide receiver and defensive backs in this picture, can be prone to high momentum collisions, which can put them at greater risk for neurodegenerative disorders in later life.

In addition to immediate health effects, some injuries sustained during a player's career can have effects that extend to their post-career life. A cohort mortality study by researchers at the National Institute for Occupational Safety and Health (NIOSH) examined 3,349 NFL players who played at least five full seasons from 1959 to 1988. The findings from this study suggest that, in comparison to the typical American male, NFL players live longer on average but have around three times the risk of death associated with neurodegenerative disorders. In particular, the risk of death from Alzheimer's disease and Amyotrophic lateral sclerosis (ALS) was roughly four times higher among former players than the average American male. The study also compared mortality risks from speed players (quarterbacks, running backs, fullbacks, wide receivers, tight ends, linebackers, cornerbacks, and safeties) and nonspeed players (offensive and defensive linemen), with findings indicating that a greater number of deaths were attributable to neurodegenerative disorders in speed players than nonspeed players. This may be due to the increased momentum of collisions from speed players.

Outside of neurodegenerative disorders, physical injuries sustained during a career can have an adverse effect on post-career life. A 1990 survey conducted jointly between the NFLPA and Ball State University found that 65% of surveyed players had suffered a major injury (defined as one that caused them to miss at least eight games): among players that played before 1959 this number was 42%, but it jumps to 72% among those who played in the 1980s. Additionally, roughly 50% of players who had played in the 1970s and 1980s reported that they retired due to injury, compared to only 32% among those who played prior to 1959. Two-thirds of players reported that injuries they had sustained limited their ability to engage in recreational activity and sports in retirement, while half said their injuries decreased their ability to perform manual labor. A follow-up survey in 1994 found that 47% of recipients reported having arthritis. These reports have been attributed to several factors, including the increase in the use of artificial turf as well as the increasing size and speed of players. Dr. James Andrews, a noted orthopedic surgeon, said that "athletes are bigger, stronger and running faster, and they're tearing up knees from cutting, changing direction on a dime". Andrews also noted the increase in the number of non-contact anterior cruciate ligament (ACL) injuries, which he attributed to the size of modern players.

== Prevention ==
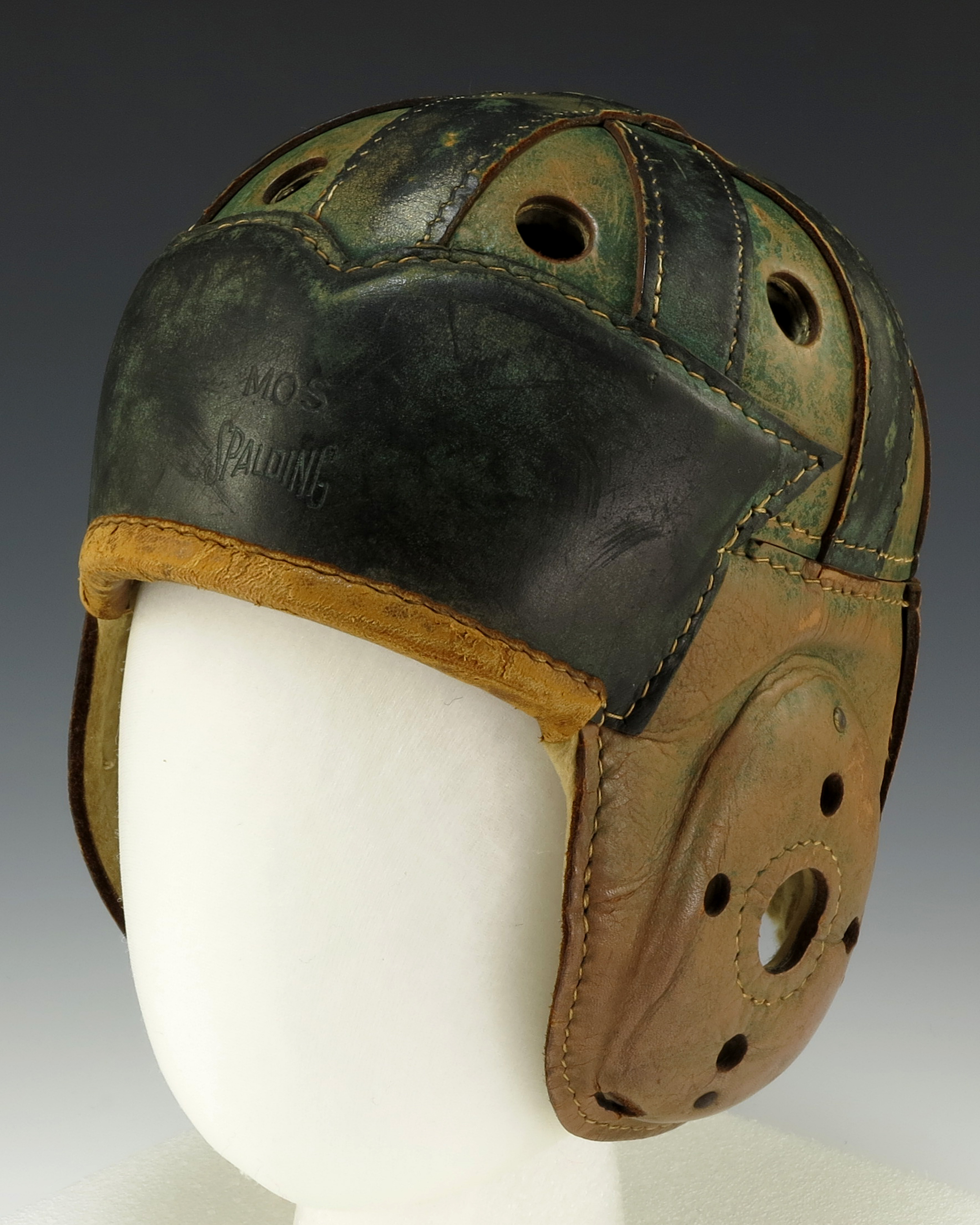
Leather helmets, the predecessor of modern football helmets, were designed to protect players from head injuries.

Injuries have always been a part of football, and various methods have been used historically and in modern times to prevent or minimize them. One method that has been used to prevent injuries is changing the rules of the sport. An early example of this was the elimination of mass formations like the flying wedge in the early 1900s, due to the large number of severe injuries the formations caused. Smaller wedges consisting of three, four, or five players were frequently used on kickoff returns before wedges were limited to two or fewer players in 2009 by the NFL; a similar rule was adopted by the NCAA a year later. The sharp decrease in the number of catastrophic cervical spine injuries since the mid-1970s has been partially credited to rule changes that modified tackling and blocking techniques. With the increasing awareness of the long-term effects of concussions, the NFL has passed rules prohibiting the targeting of "defenseless" players over-the-shoulder, requiring plays to be blown dead when the runner loses his helmet, and placing more stringent limits to the ability of players who have sustained a concussion to return to play.

Similarly, modern equipment was developed to reduce injuries. The football helmet, although a scapegoat for concussions, serves as effective protection against more dangerous injuries like skull fractures. The modern helmet traces its roots back to the leather helmets used by football players in the early 1900s to protect themselves from head injuries. Helmets later evolved to be made of hard plastic, and a facemask was added to protect players from sustaining facial injuries. More recent additions to the helmet include the Guardian Cap, a shell made of soft padding that is fitted over the hard shell of a helmet to further reduce impact force to the head. Many players also wear mouthguards to prevent injuries to their teeth and tongues; at some levels, such as the NCAA, the use of a mouthguard is mandatory. Football players wear a number of pads to protect themselves – shoulder pads are the most important pads, protecting the shoulder and sternum, but thigh pads, hip pads, tail pads, and knee pads are also used. Many quarterbacks wear rib protectors (nicknamed "flak jackets" for their resemblance to that form of body armor) to protect their ribcage. Cleats come in a number of lengths, with players choosing which cleat to use based on the playing field – players prefer a shorter cleat when playing on artificial turf to prevent their feet from digging into the ground and risking injury, while longer cleats are generally used on fields that are wet or slippery to provide better traction. Athletic cups are not typically used at the professional level because athletic cups tend to make it harder to move and there is an unwritten code among players not to target the groin area. Additionally, studies have shown that proper conditioning techniques, fitness routines and exercise routines, as well as high-quality equipment and coaching, can reduce the risk of injury among players.

== See also ==
- Concussions in American football
- List of sportspeople who died during their careers
- List of NFL players with chronic traumatic encephalopathy
