= Spinal precautions =

Efforts to prevent movement of the spine in those with a risk of a spine injury

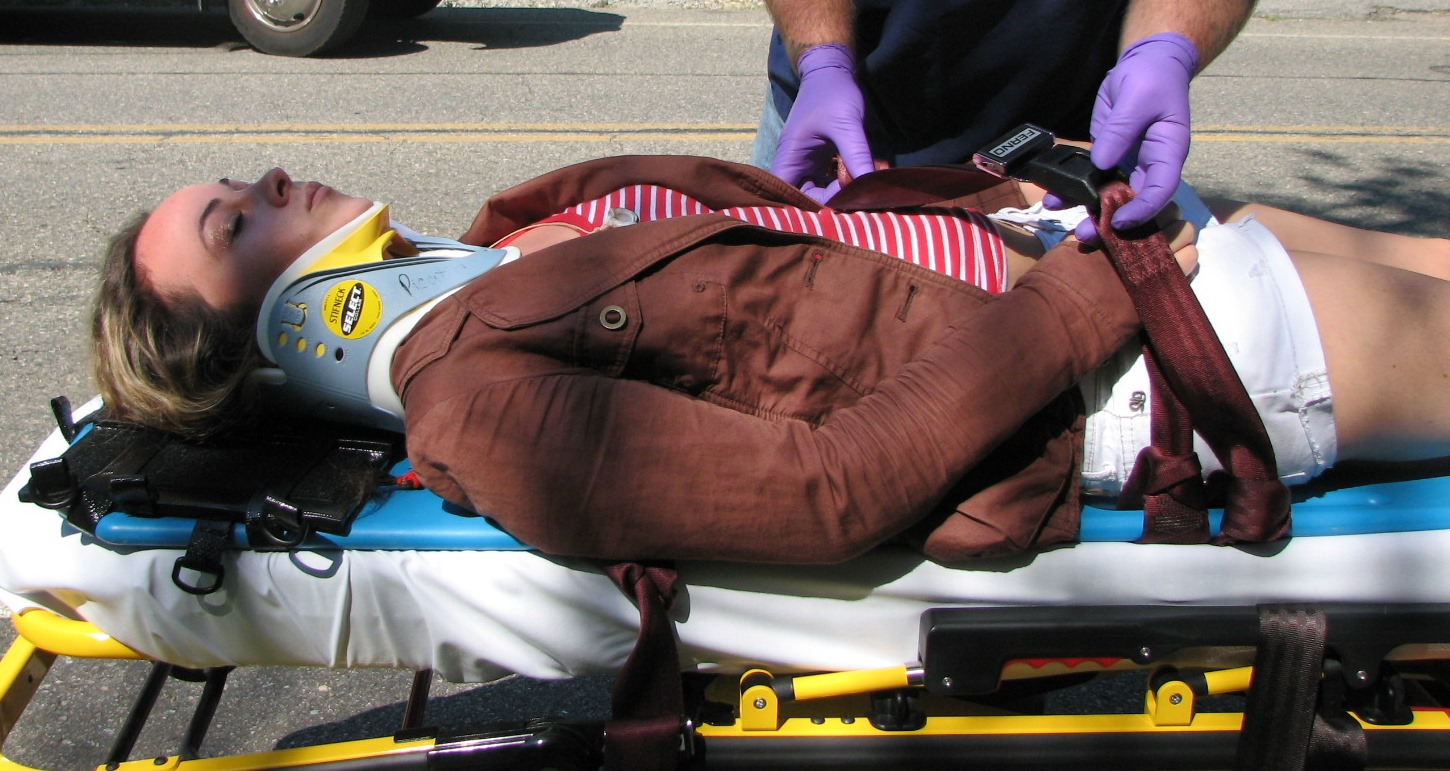
- A person with a hard cervical collar on a long board
- Other names: Spinal immobilization, spinal motion restriction

Spinal precautions, also known as spinal immobilization and spinal motion restriction, are efforts to prevent movement of the bones of the spine in those with a risk of a spine injury. This is done as an effort to prevent injury to the spinal cord in unstable spinal fractures. About 0.5-3% of people with blunt trauma will have a spine injury, with 42-50% of injuries due to motor vehicle accidents, 27-43% from falls or work injuries, and the rest due to sports injuries (9%) or assault (11%). The majority of spinal cord injuries are to the cervical spine (neck, 52%), followed by the thoracic (upper back) and lumbar (lower back) spine. Cervical spinal cord injuries can result in tetraplegia or paraplegia. Of spine injuries, only 0.01% are unstable and require intervention (either surgery or a spinal orthosis).

Spinal precautions are controversial because benefits are unclear and there are drawbacks including pressure ulcers, increased pain, and delayed transport times. Spinal boards can also be uncomfortable.

== Indications ==
Spinal precautions are often first initiated by emergency medical services in the prehospital setting. There are multiple decision rules to determine who should be immobilized.

Due to concerns of side effects, the National Association of EMS Physicians and the American College of Surgeons recommend its use only in those at high risk. This includes: those with blunt trauma who have a decreased level of consciousness, pain or tenderness in the spine, those with numbness or weakness believed to be due to a spinal injury, and those with a significant trauma mechanism who are intoxicated or have other major injuries. The use of a backboard is recommended only to move the person from the scene to the stretcher, after which it should be removed.

These recommendations are also endorsed by the Consortium for Spinal Cord Medicine. Immobilization is also recommended in those with a definite spinal cord injury.

Spinal motion stabilization is not supported for penetrating trauma to the back, including that caused by gunshot wounds.

== Prehospital ==
=== Methods ===
Spinal precautions generally include long spine boards, cervical collars, head blocks, and straps with the goal of immobilizing or reducing movement throughout the entirety of the spine. They also include methods to reduce spinal movement while moving a patient, such as logrolling. Measures to reduce intracranial pressure, such as lowering the feet of the bed while keeping it flat, are also sometimes used.

If a longboard is used, cushioning it is useful to decrease discomfort due to pressure. A vacuum mattress and scoop board typically results in lower pressures.

=== Contraindications ===
Spinal precautions should not be used in patients who are at low risk of spinal injury. If intubation is required the cervical collar should be removed and neck stabilization provided by a trained staff member holding the patient's head. Whenever possible, intubation methods that decrease spinal motion should be used such as awake fiberoptic intubation.

In those with penetrating neck or head trauma spinal immobilization may increase the risk of death.

=== Controversy ===
There is little high quality evidence for spinal motion stabilization of the neck before arrival at a hospital. Multiple studies have demonstrated that current methods used to immobilize the spine in the field do not improve patient outcomes. Additionally, because spinal cord injury is rare, it is estimated that if everyone at risk for spine injury was placed on spinal precautions, approximately 50-100 people would be put on precautions for every one person who actually had an injury. The benefit of spinal precautions is also questioned because the initial forces that lead to spine injury tend to be massive, while forces experienced during transport are subsequently minor. Thus, there is skepticism that movement during transport could cause a new or worsened spinal cord injury if an initial high-impact injury, such as a car crash, did not.

Spinal precautions including a cervical collar and rigid board have been shown to delay time to intubation, increase risk of aspiration, raise intracranial pressure and cause pain, agitation, and pressure ulcers. A systematic review found cervical collar related skin ulcers from the devices in 7 to 38%.

There are no high-quality randomized trials supporting the practice of spinal cord immobilization in the field. However, secondary injury (i.e. injury to the spinal cord during transport after an initial trauma), is suspected to be the cause of up to 1/4 of spinal cord injuries. Because of the devastating consequences of spinal cord injury and the theoretical benefit of spinal precautions in preventing secondary injury to the spinal cord, the use of spinal precautions is still recommended in high-risk patients by major societies.

== Clearance ==
Due to their side-effects, backboards should be removed as soon as possible, even before imaging. It is also recommended to remove cervical collars as soon as possible. If people require ongoing cervical spine precautions, they should be switched to an adjustable cervical collar such as a Miami J collar or halo-gravity traction device for long-term immobilization.

=== Cervical spine ===
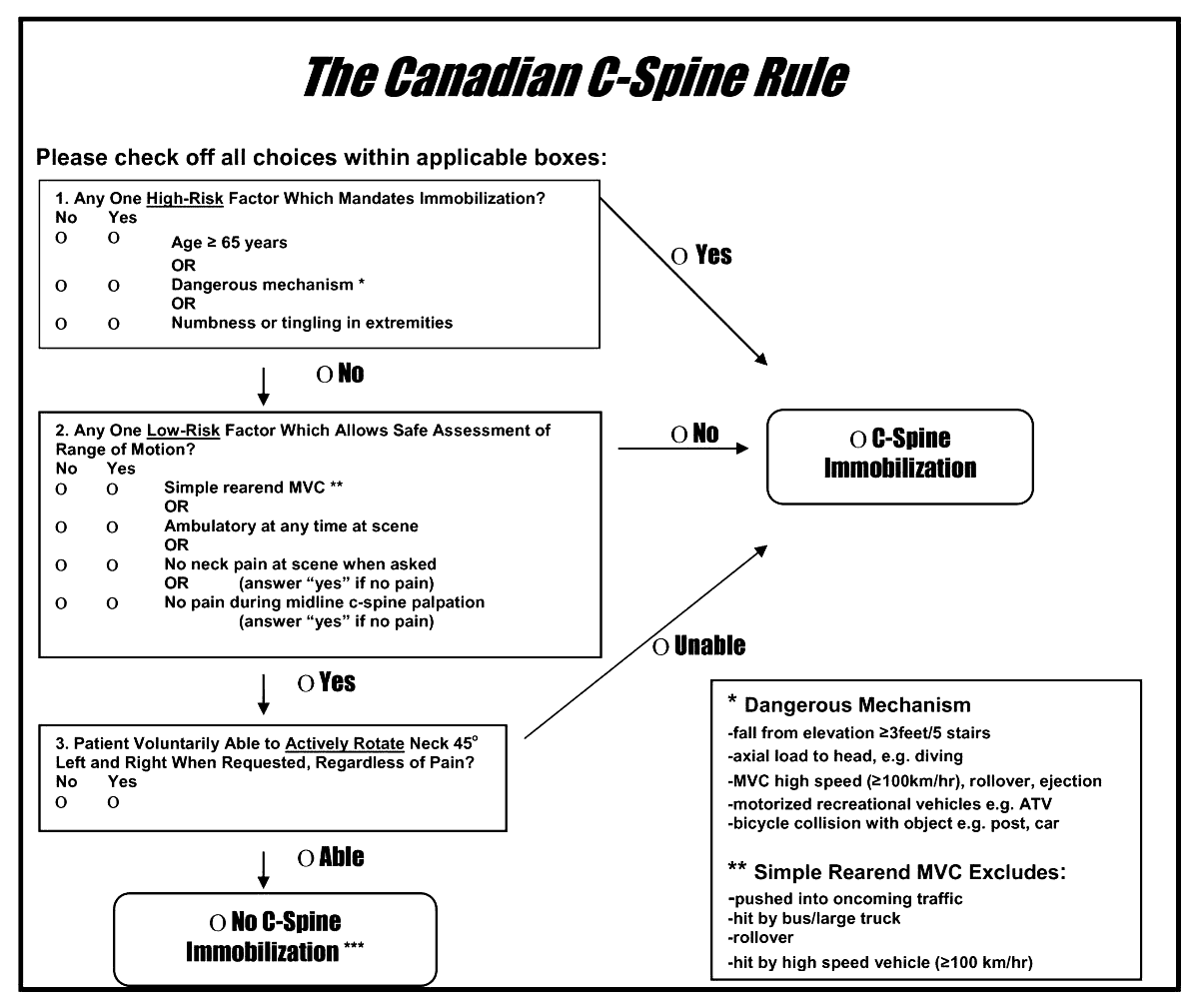
The Canadian C-spine rule for those with a normal Glasgow coma scale and who are otherwise stable

There are two main algorithms, the Canadian C-spine rule and NEXUS, which are used to decide who requires cervical spine imaging via CT scan after blunt trauma, and who can be cleared without imaging. The Canadian C-spine rule appears to have greater sensitivity and specificity (i.e. fewer false positives and false negatives). However, following either rule is reasonable.

If the chosen decision rule (NEXUS or Canadian C-spine) is negative, or if cervical spine imaging is negative, the cervical collar can be removed if the patient does not have significant midline tenderness and can move the neck 45 degrees to both sides. If a patient cannot do both, the collar should be replaced and additional imaging or follow-up should be pursued depending on facility guidelines.

=== Thoracic and lumbar spine ===
The NEXUS and Canadian C-Spine rules do not apply to suspected thoracic or lumbar injury; indeed, there are currently no validated guidelines for who requires imaging in this setting. Instead, imaging should be obtained according to physician gestalt. High-risk features include tenderness in the center spine, new numbness or weakness, or spinal fracture of another area; imaging of the thoracic and lumbar spine should be pursued in patients with these findings. If a patient's cervical spine has been cleared, but they have a thoracic or lumbar spine injury, the cervical collar can be removed but they must maintain thoracolumbar immobilization using a firm padded bed and careful maneuvers for transfers and repositioning.

If a person has new numbness or weakness but without evidence of a spinal fracture on CT-scan, they may have spinal cord injury without radiographic abnormality (SCIWORA), and may require MRI to confirm or rule out the diagnosis. Spinal precautions should be maintained while pursuing further imaging.

== Postoperative ==
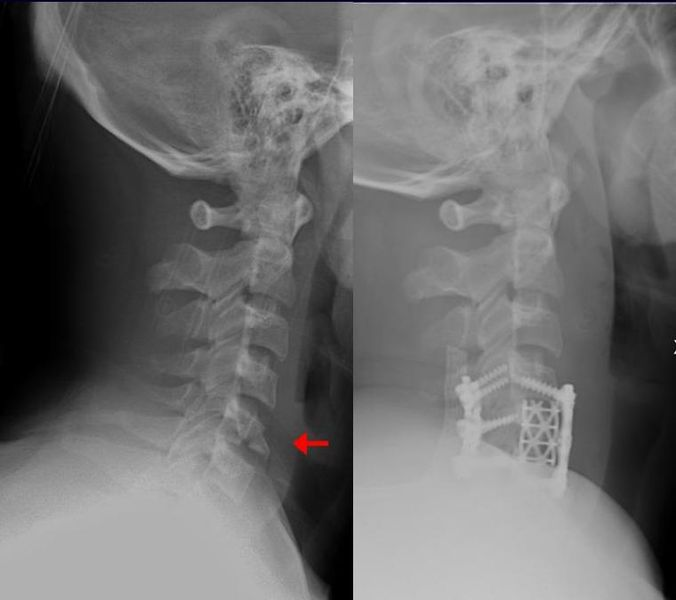
Fracture of the cervical spine (left red arrow showing vertebral body fracture) treated with open reduction and internal fixation (ORIF) (hardware seen on the right)

Patients with spinal cord injury due to trauma tend to have other life-threatening traumatic injuries or complications of spinal cord injury such as neurogenic shock that take precedence to repair of the spine. Thus, spinal motion restriction should be maintained while other medical interventions are begun. Neurological outcomes may be better with early spine repair when possible, however the evidence is low-quality.

In all patients with spinal cord injury, high-quality skin care to prevent pressure ulcers is essential. This includes adequate cushioning, frequent repositioning of the patient, keeping the skin dry and clean, and ensuring adequate nutrition.

After surgery for an unstable spinal fracture, methods to reduce movement of the spine vary depending on the severity of injury and method of repair. Surgeons strongly recommend to avoid smoking, as it slows healing. There is also debate that NSAID medications such as aspirin, ibuprofen, and naproxen may delay bone repair after spinal fusion or grafting, however there is some evidence that short-term use around the time of surgery is not associated with worse outcomes. Finally, patients should avoid activities that cause movement to the spine, including bending, lifting more than 5-10 pounds, or twisting the spine for 4–12 weeks after surgery. Patients can learn special ways to get out of bed and do other activities during this time. Other activities that should be avoided until a provider permits them include soaking in water like a bathtub or hottub, sports (running, horseback riding, etc.), and chores (vacuuming, sweeping, opening windows/jars etc.).

=== Methods ===
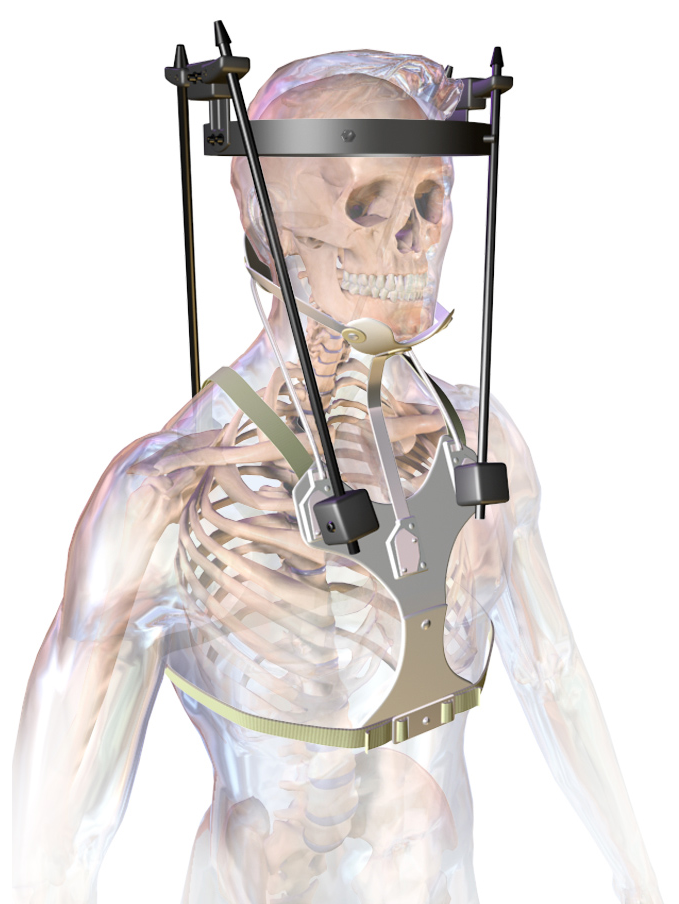
Depiction of the halo traction device.

There are multiple devices that can be used in addition to avoiding maneuvers or activities that move the spine. Long-term cervical spine immobilization in patients with cervical spine fracture who did not undergo surgery can be performed using a long-term cervical collar (Miami J, Philadelphia, or Aspen) or halo traction device. When using a traction device such as the halo to hold the spine in place while it heals, this is called closed reduction, as opposed to a surgery which is termed open reduction with internal fixation (ORIF). In general, the halo traction device is preferred for unstable fracture, while the cervical collars are used for neck sprain, stable fracture, or after surgical fixation. Soft cervical collars do not restrict head movement and are more so used for comfort. The sternal occipital mandibular immobilizer (SOMI) can also be used to provide support for cervical spine sprain, stable fracture, or postoperative support.

For thoracic and lumbar spine, support can be provided using custom-fit, hard-shell back braces, most commonly after surgery.

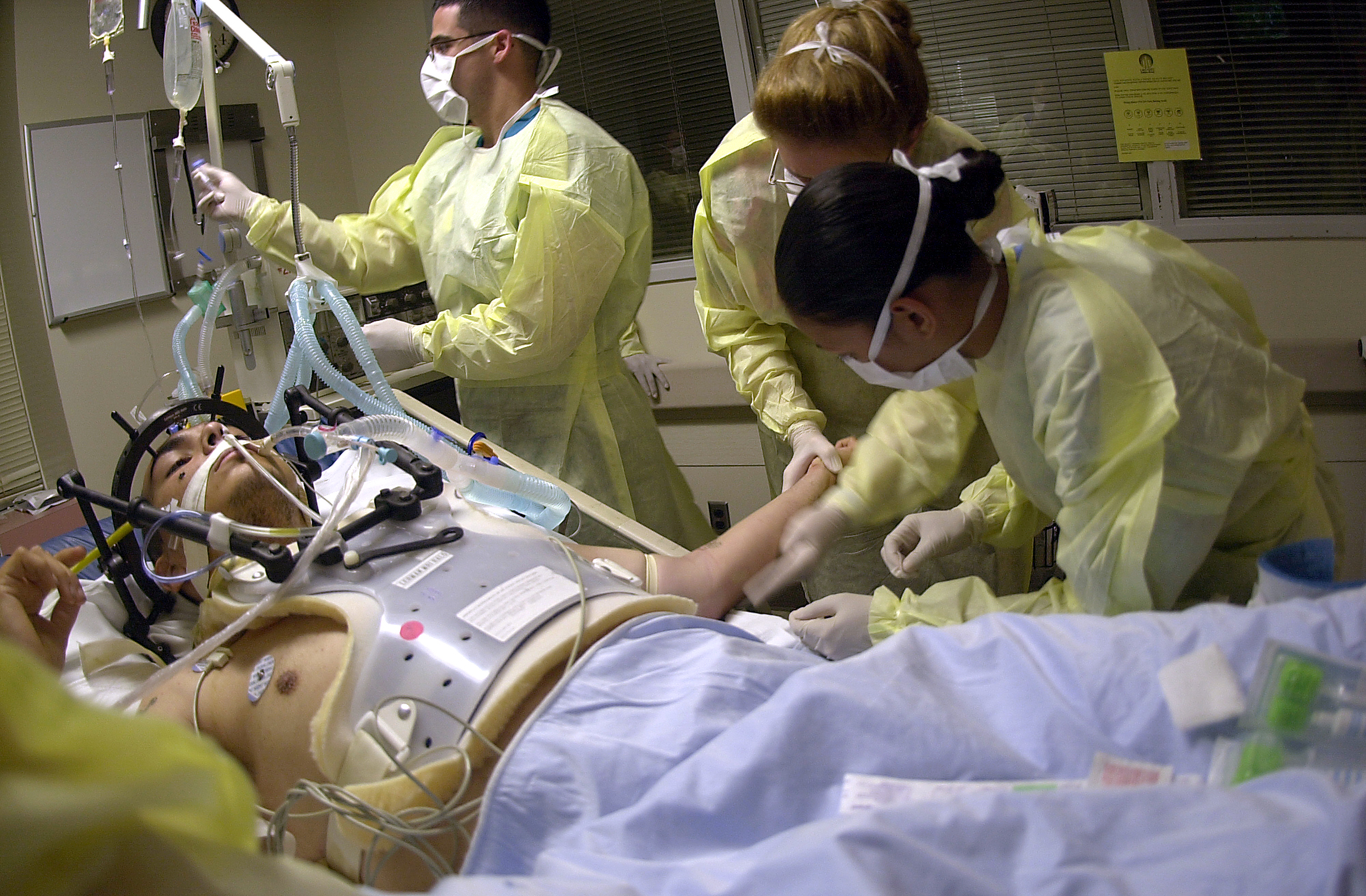
A patient in the LA County Medical Center intensive care unit with a Halo orthosis in place. (July 2004)

These devices are used while the spine is healing and are not needed permanently.

== History ==
Spinal precautions including prehospital use of a backboard and cervical collar were first introduced in the United States in the 1960s. Before the widespread use of spinal precautions in the 1970s, 55% of patients referred to spinal cord injury centers had complete spinal cord injury. In the 1980s, spinal immobilization was initially used routinely for people who had experienced physical trauma, with little evidence to support its use. However, the majority of patients in the 1980s had incomplete spinal cord injury, indicating an improvement in outcomes from the 1970s to the 1980s.

The widespread use of routine spinal precautions drew criticism and prompted studies investigating the ability of EMS providers to selectively determine who required spinal precautions in the field in the late 1990s and early 2000s. These studies led to the 2008 recommendation by the Consortium of Spinal Cord Medicine to only immobilize high-risk patients.
