= MINIs on the Dragon =

MINIs on the Dragon is an annual gathering of MINI Coopers in Robbinsville, North Carolina. Started in 2003, the event takes place over the first weekend of May each year. The event is in part named after the legendary section of US 129 known as "The Dragon" which runs from North Carolina to Tennessee and has 318 curves in 11 miles. The event attracts over 900 attendees and over 600 MINI Coopers. The record was over 800 cars. The event primarily is attended by the newer BMW MINI Coopers but also attracts several classic Mini Coopers each year. This is the largest grassroots MINI Cooper event in the US each year. The event "headquarters" is in Fontana Village, a quaint vacation resort that was originally built to house the workers as they built the Fontana Dam during World War II. Each year MINI owners from over 30 different States and Canada make the pilgrimage to Fontana Village to participate in this event. Starting off as a three-day event, it has currently grown into its newer format of four days and includes a vendor alley, group dinners, a Brewswap, Bingo Night and a host of various drives and other activities, there is the Friday morning Dragon Parade, the Saturday night Midnight on the Dragon. Brave MINIs gather at Deals Gap and at 00:00 depart and drive the Dragon.
