= Deals Gap, North Carolina =

Mountain pass

Deals Gap
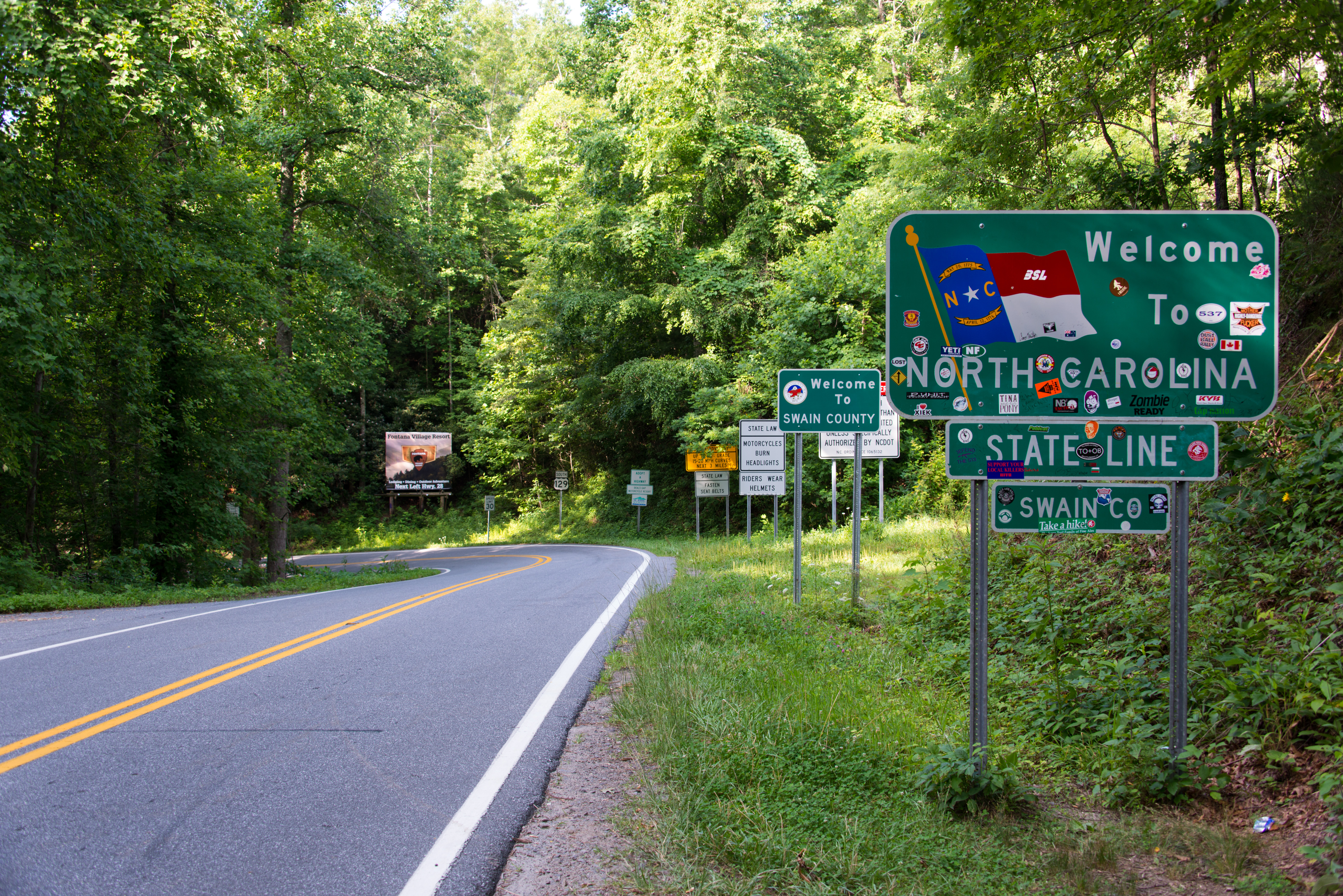
- Crossing Deals Gap into North Carolina

- Location within North Carolina
- Elevation: 1,988 ft (606 m)
- Traversed by: US 129

Location
- Location: North Carolina; Tennessee; United States
- Range: Great Smoky Mountains
- Coordinates: 35°28′25″N 83°55′15″W
- Topo map: USGS Tapoco

Deals Gap (el. 1,988 ft (606 m)) is a mountain pass along the North Carolina–Tennessee state line, bordering the Great Smoky Mountains National Park and near the Little Tennessee River. At 0.7 miles (1.1 km) south of the gap is the unincorporated community that shares the same name, located at the intersection of US 129 and NC 28. The area is popular with motorcycle and sports car enthusiasts, who cross the gap into Tennessee to drive along the "Tail of the Dragon", famous for its 318 curves in 11 miles (18 km).

== The Dragon ==
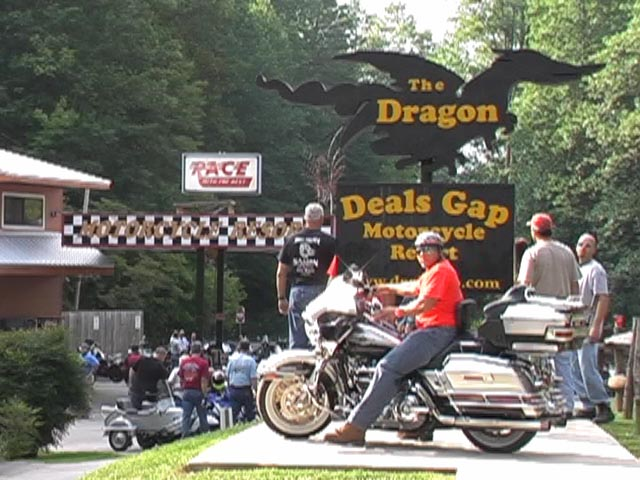
Deals Gap community

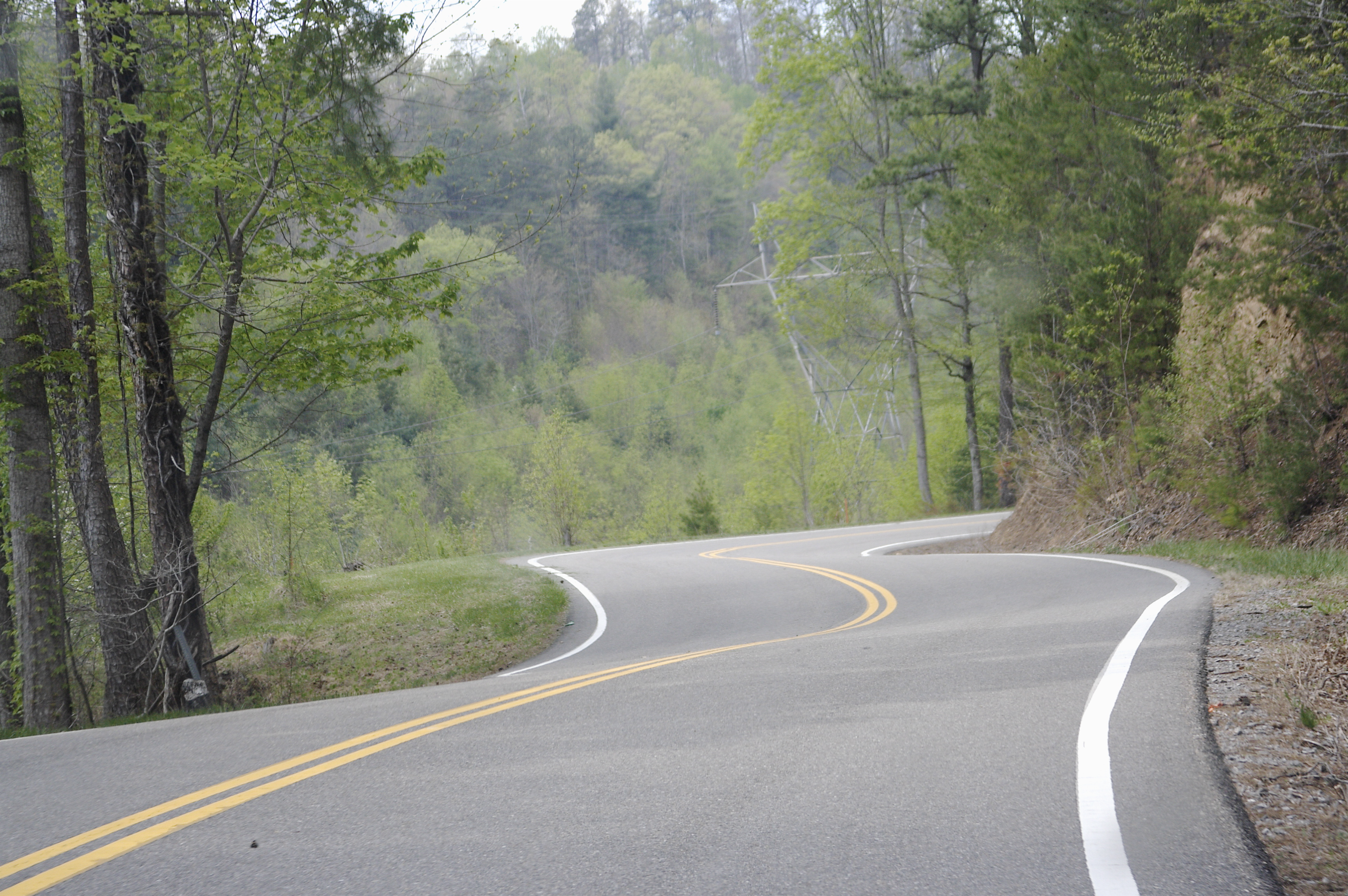
Tail of the Dragon

Deals Gap is a popular and internationally famous destination for motorcycle and sports car enthusiasts, as it is along a stretch of two-lane road known since 1981 as "Tail of the Dragon", often shortened to simply "The Dragon". The 11-mile (18 km) stretch of the Dragon in Tennessee is said to have 318 curves. Some of the Dragon's sharpest curves have names like Copperhead Corner, Hog Pen Bend, Wheelie Hell, Shade Tree Corner, Mud Corner, Sunset Corner, Gravity Cavity, Beginner's End, and Brake or Bust Bend. The road earned its name from its curves being said to resemble a dragon. The stretch bears the street name "Tapoco Road" in North Carolina and "Calderwood Highway" in Tennessee and is signed entirely by US 129 (hidden SR 115).

Since part of the road is also the southwestern border of the Great Smoky Mountains National Park, there is no development along the 11-mile (18 km) stretch, resulting in no danger of vehicles pulling out in front of those in the right of way. It mostly travels through a forested area and there are a few scenic overlooks and pull-off points along the route. The speed limit on the Dragon was 55 mph (89 km/h) before 1992; it was reduced to 30 mph (48 km/h) in 2005. The presence of law enforcement on the Tennessee portion has dramatically increased since 2007.

During the summer months, the Blount County Rescue Squad maintains a presence on The Dragon on the weekends to assist Rural/Metro with emergency calls stemming from the frequent motorcycle accidents that occur there, as Rural/Metro dispatches from nearby Maryville, Tennessee, and emergency response times may be in excess of an hour.

Approximately 37 traffic fatalities were recorded on this stretch of road from 2000 to 2017.

In December 2021, YouTuber CGP Grey drove a Tesla Model 3 equipped with the latest beta version of Tesla Autopilot through Deals Gap. The autopilot successfully navigated the route without human intervention.

== See also ==
- MINIs on the Dragon
