= JD Farrington =

Physician

J.D. “Deke” Farrington was a physician who played a role in the creation of an EMS (emergency medical services) system in the United States and pioneered EMS education. He is considered the "father of modern EMS" and is credited with inventing the spine board and approving the use of the Star of Life as the symbol for EMS.

== Career ==
Farrington wanted to implement the successes of emergency treatment in World War II and the Korean War on civilians. In 1958, he was training firefighters in Chicago in what was an early version of the EMT-A course. His influential paper "Death in a Ditch" outlined ways in which trained EMS providers could respond to car crashes. He also helped develop the U.S. Department of Transportation's EMT-Ambulance training program.

He was a member of the Committee on Trauma of the American Academy of Orthopaedic Surgeons, and helped develop the first emergency medical services program for ambulance staff, training them to evaluate patients before transportation.

He coordinated the first nationally recognized EMT training course in Wausau, Wisconsin.

Farrington was the first chair of the National Registry of Emergency Medical Technicians (NREMT) formed in 1971.
