= Cervical collar =

Medical device used to support a neck

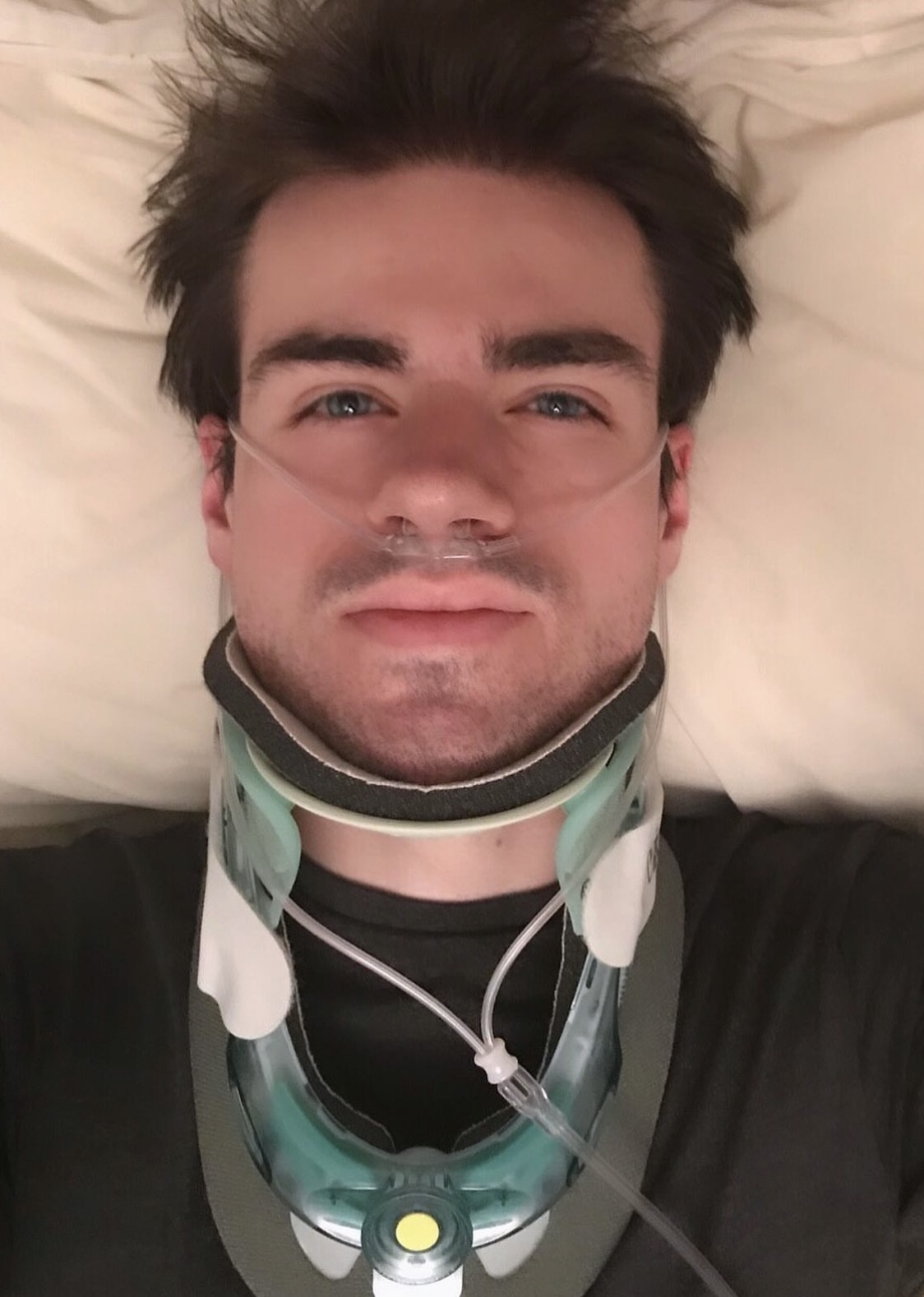
- A man in a hospital bed wearing a cervical collar following a suspected spinal cord injury

A cervical collar, also known as a neck brace, is a medical device used to support and immobilize a person's neck. It is also applied by emergency personnel to those who have had traumatic head or neck injuries, although they should not be routinely used in prehospital care. They can also be used to treat chronic medical conditions.

Whenever people have a traumatic head or neck injury, they may have a cervical fracture. This makes them at high risk for spinal cord injury, which could be exacerbated by movement of the person and could lead to paralysis or death. A common scenario for this injury would be a person suspected of having whiplash because of a car accident. In order to prevent further injury, such people may have a collar placed by medical professionals until X-rays can be taken to determine if a cervical spine fracture exists. Medical professionals will often use the NEXUS criteria and/or the Canadian C-spine rules to clear a cervical collar and determine the need for imaging.

The routine use of a cervical collar is not recommended.

Cervical collars are also used therapeutically to help realign the spinal cord and relieve pain, although they are usually not worn for long periods of time. Another use of the cervical collar is for strains, sprains, or whiplash. If pain is persistent, the collar might be required to remain attached to help in the healing process. A person may also need a cervical collar, or may require a halo fixation device to support the neck during recovery after surgery such as cervical spinal fusion.

== Types ==
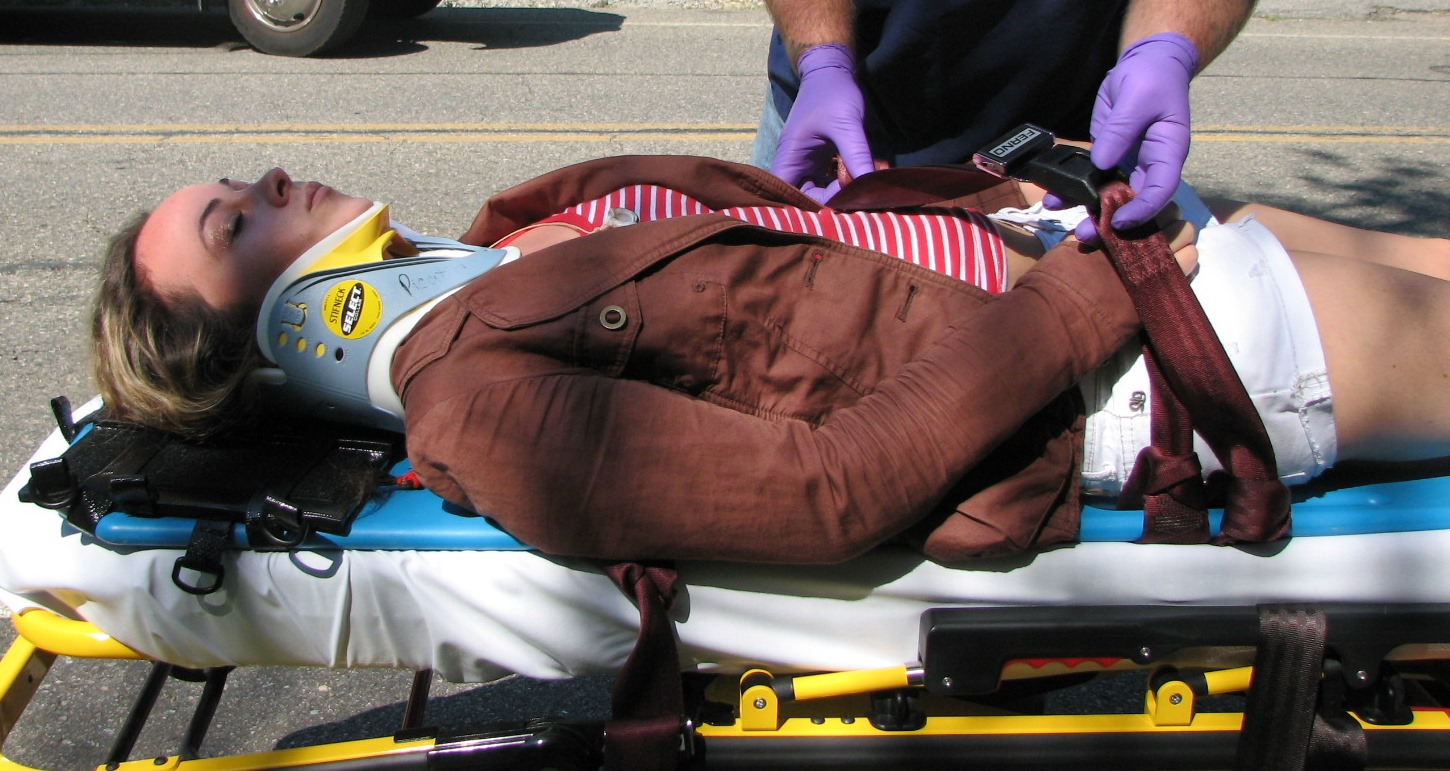
A neck collar being placed on a patient by emergency services.

A soft collar is fairly flexible and is the least limiting but can carry a high risk of further breakage, especially in people with osteoporosis. They are usually made of felt. It can be used for minor injuries or after healing has allowed the neck to become more stable.

A range of manufactured rigid collars are also used, usually comprising (a) a firm plastic bi-valved shell secured with Velcro straps and (b) removable padded liners. The also contain a back pad, back panel, front pad, front panel, and chin pad. There are air holes throughout the device to provide ventilation to the area but also to allow access for a tracheostomy if needed. The rigidness is provided by plexiglass in some models. The most frequently prescribed are the Aspen, Malibu, Miami J, and Philadelphia collars. All these can be used with additional chest and head extension pieces to increase stability.

Cervical collars are incorporated into rigid braces that constrain the head and chest together. Examples include the Sterno-Occipital Mandibular Immobilization Device (SOMI), Lerman Minerva and Yale types. Special cases, such as very young children or non-cooperative adults, are sometimes still immobilized in medical plaster of paris casts, such as the Minerva cast.

Rigid collars are most restrictive when flexing the neck and least restrictive with lateral rotation when compared to soft collars. Despite this, subjects have similar range of motion when asked to perform activities of daily living. It is thought that these collars provide a proprioceptive guide on how much to move one's neck and when patients are preoccupied with performing an activity they are able to move their neck more. This is why in more minor injuries, cervical collars are still placed to remind patients of their injury so they can restrict any activities that may worsen their condition.

== Application and care ==
When applying a cervical collar, it must be tight enough to immobilize the neck but must be loose enough to avoid pressure on the vasculature of the neck, strangulation, and pressure ulcers. Ideally, any clothing or jewelry in the neck area should be removed before applying the collar. Next, a collar size must be chosen according to the patient's size and build. The practitioner will then measure the length of the neck. The collar is then placed by one practitioner while the other holds the neck still. Then, the collar should be locked to the ideal neck length according to the specific manufacturer's manual. The chin must be in the chin piece and the collar must extend down to the sternal notch. If the patient has a tracheostomy hole, medical professionals must assure that the hole is midline and accessible in a patient with a cervical collar. Some common errors include incorrect chosen collar size, incorrect technique in placing collar, and incorrect measurement of neck length.

Cervical collars and patient's necks should be evaluated and cleaned frequently for hygienic purposes as well as to avoid pressure ulcers. When the neck area is being cleaned, it is again important for two people to help remove the collar. One person must help hold the neck and keep it aligned while the other unfastens the straps and removes the collar. The area is then cleaned with soap, water, and washcloths. If there is evidence of skin breakdown, other topical agents and even antibiotics may be used if there is evidence of infection as well.

== History ==
The cervical collar was invented in 1966 by George Cottrell during the Vietnam War as a way to provide neck immobilization in American soldiers with potential unstable neck injuries. Its use in the prehospital setting in the United States was popularized by orthopedic surgeon J. D. Farrington. In his paper, "Death in a Ditch", Farrington described seeing "sloppy and inefficient removal of victim[s] from their vehicle". He explained how a standardized approach of applying cervical collars before extracting motor vehicle collision victims from their vehicles is necessary to prevent this.

== Use over time ==
As a result of several small randomized clinical trials over the last decade, hospitals and ambulance staff have seen a significant reduction in the number of patients that are being immobilized. This has been due to complications such as increased intracranial pressure with traumatic brain injury, along with access issues for airway management in obtunded patients. Other risks and complications include increased testing and imaging, increased incidence in displacement of spinal fractures in the elderly, limited physical examination of patients, neck pain, pressure ulcers, and increased length in hospital stay. Because of these potential complications, cervical collars are not recommended in trauma patients with isolated penetrating injury and no neurological deficits. This is because the benefit of a potential secondary cervical injury being prevented with a cervical collar is much less than the risks associated with a cervical collar; with the most concerning being trouble accessing a patient's airway. Some medical professionals have even been calling for a ban on cervical collars, stating that they cause more harm than good. There is also very little evidence that shows cervical collars to be actually making a difference in traumatic cervical spine injury.

== Other uses ==
Cervical collars are used much less commonly for things outside of cervical injury and precaution. These uses include cervical radiculopathy, sleep apnea, and patients on CPAP ventilation. Most studies for these conditions are small scale and limited.

In a 2009 study, it was shown that patients with a confirmed recent diagnosis of cervical radiculopathy who had a cervical collar applied had greater decrease in pain after 6 weeks compared to patients who did not have one applied. When these patients were followed up after six months, almost all of the subjects had complete or near complete resolution of any pain and/or disability, regardless if they had a cervical collar applied or not.

Sleep apnea can be worsened by anterior flexion of the neck or posterior movement of the mandible when sleeping supine. Cervical collars are used to prevent these movements when sleeping in these patients. Small scale studies have failed to show any improvement in oxygenation, snoring, and/or apneic episodes with the use of cervical collars at night. These patients can experience discomfort and feelings of strangulation at night if the collar is not fastened properly. Despite this, some practitioners still apply cervical collars for sleep apnea.

Patients on CPAP ventilation can often have suboptimal positioning due to pain, discomfort, or lack of knowledge. Similarly to patients with sleep apnea, patients on CPAP need optimization of their neck position to keep their airway clear of any obstruction. Specifically, posterior movement of the mandible is to be avoided as to not cause the strap of the CPAP to come off. Also, limited head movement while on CPAP is desired to optimize oxygen flow in and out of the device. Cervical soft collars are used to try to achieve both of these goals. In a small study analyzing the use of cervical collars in patients on CPAP ventilation with a history of sleep apnea, a significant benefit was observed.

== Sport ==
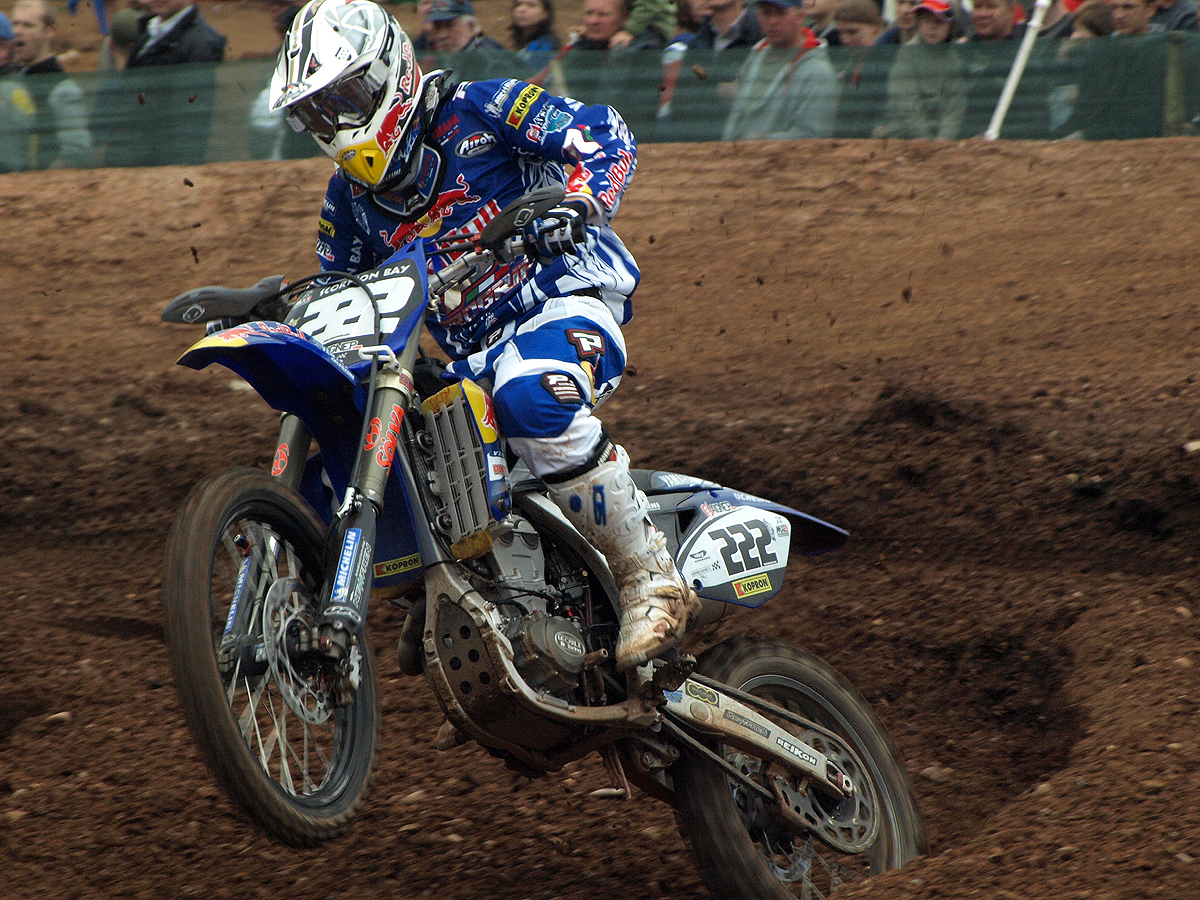
A motocross rider wearing a sports neck brace

In high-risk motorsports such as motocross, go-kart racing and speed-boat racing, racers often wear a protective collar to avoid whiplash and other neck injuries.

Designs range from simple foam collars to complex composite devices.

== Additional images ==
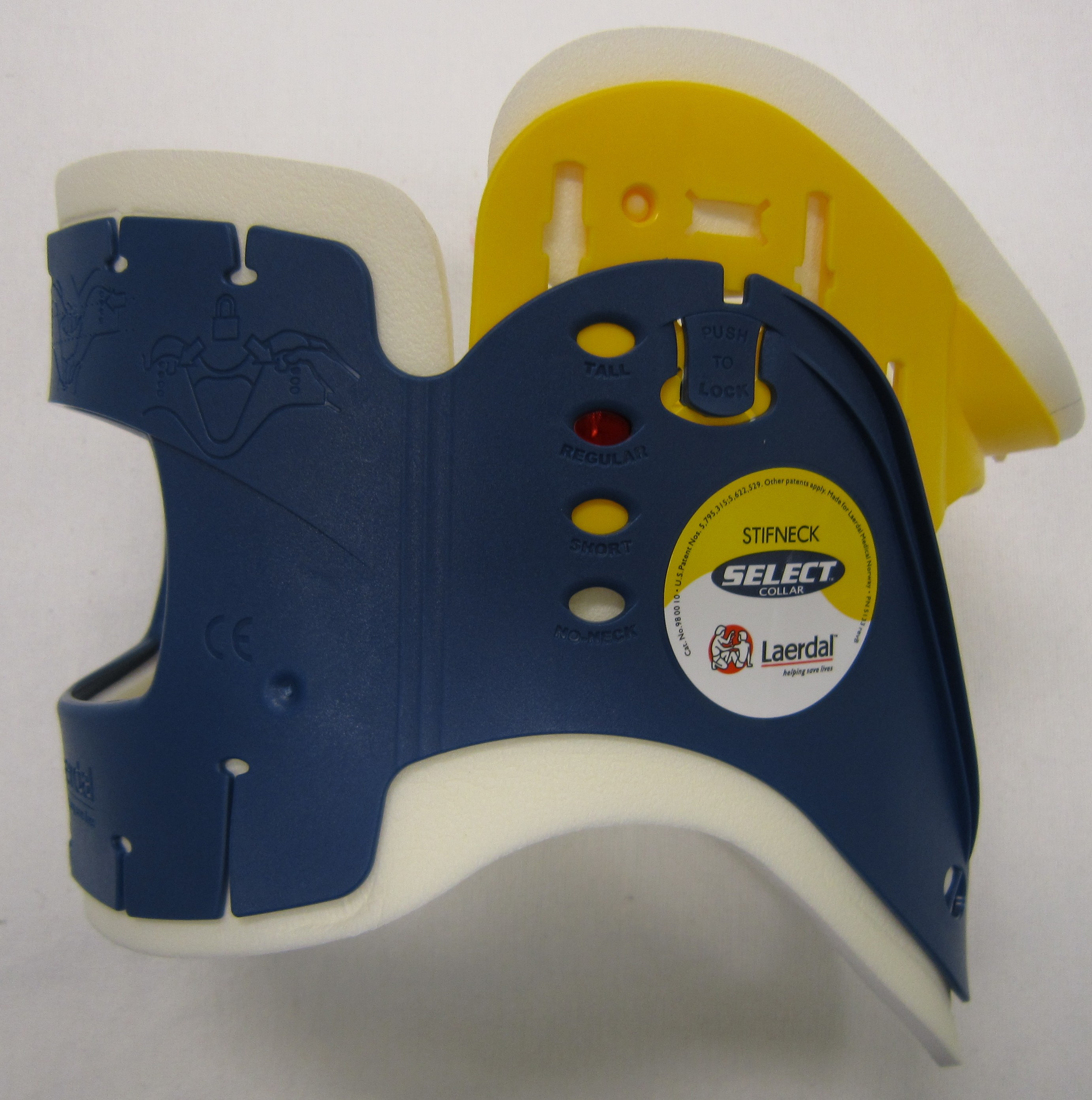
Side view of a cervical collar

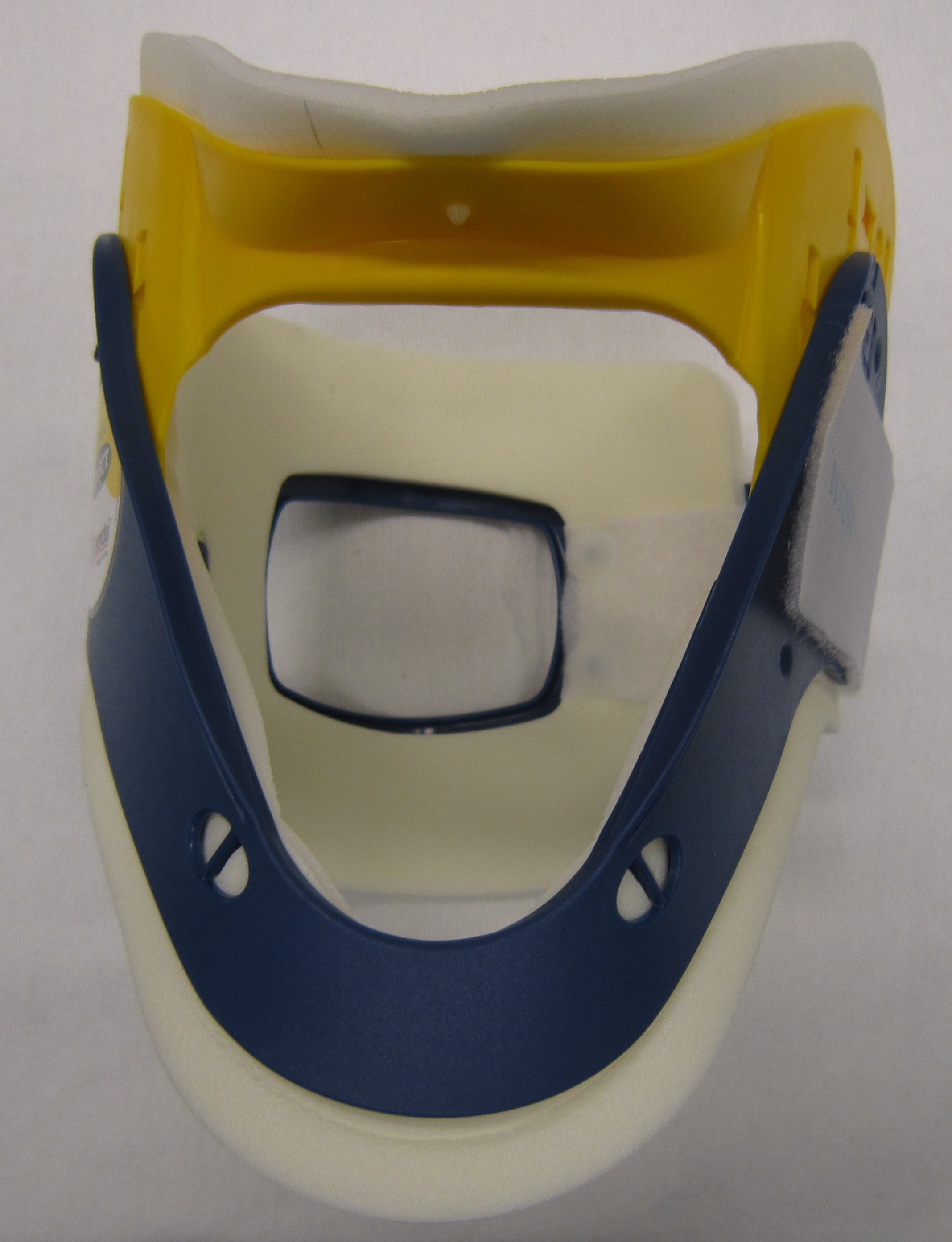
Front view of a cervical collar. The opening provides anterior access to the neck for a cricothyrotomy or tracheotomy.

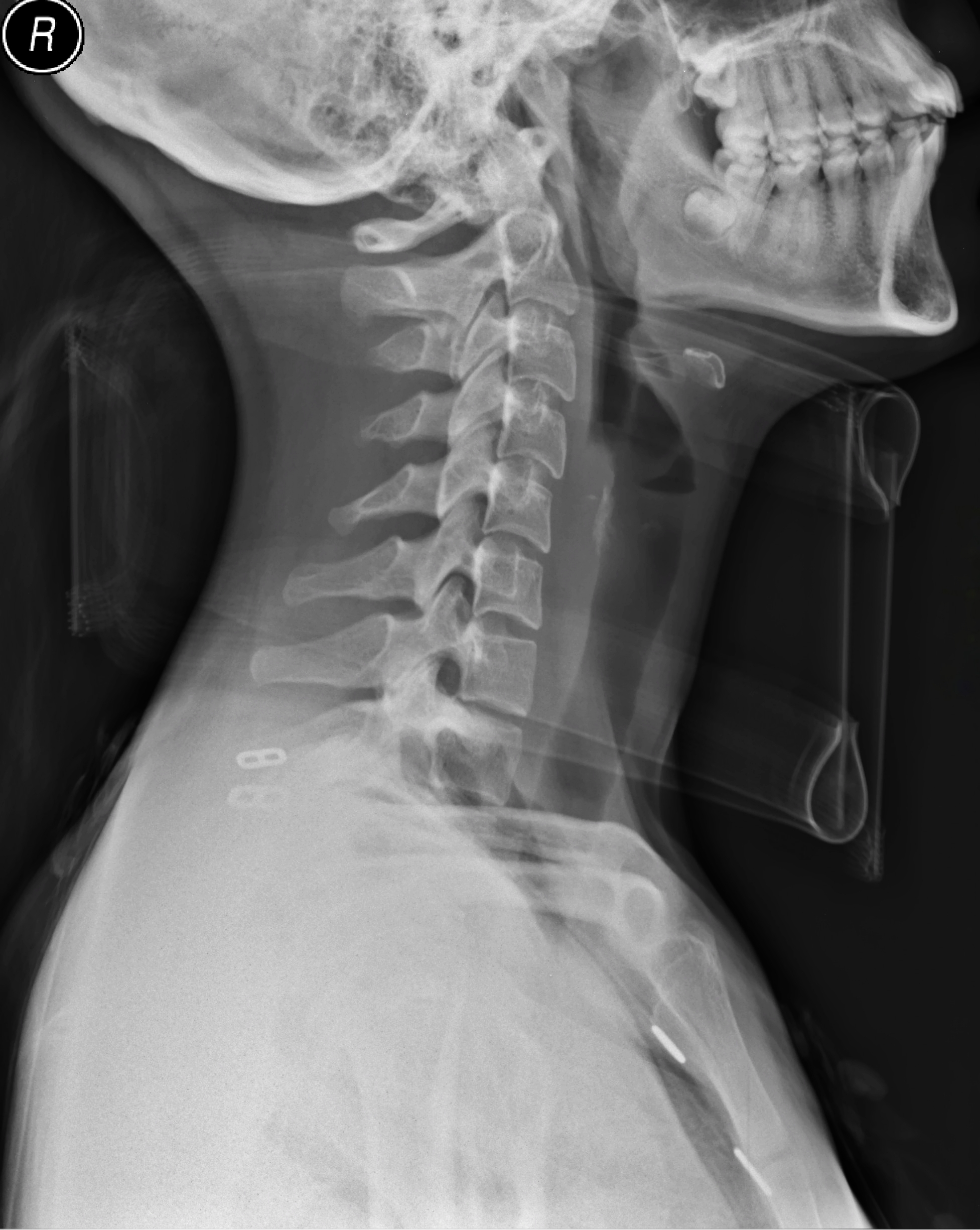
Side view X-ray of the neck with a cervical collar

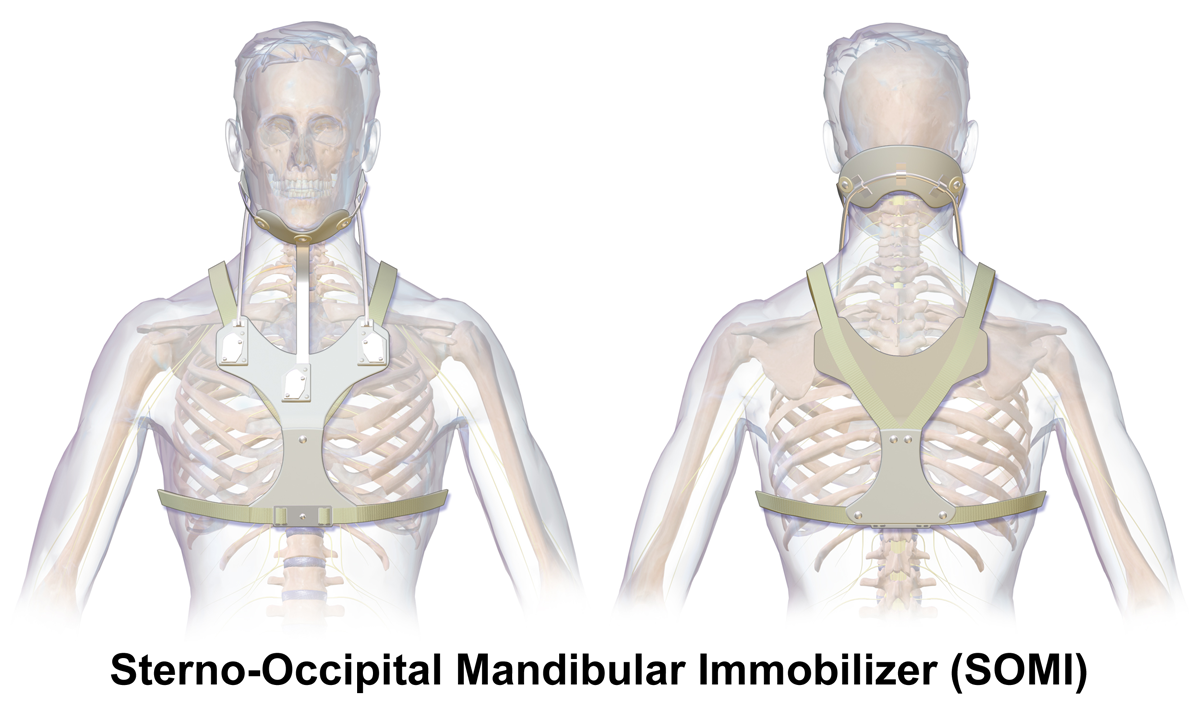
SOMI brace

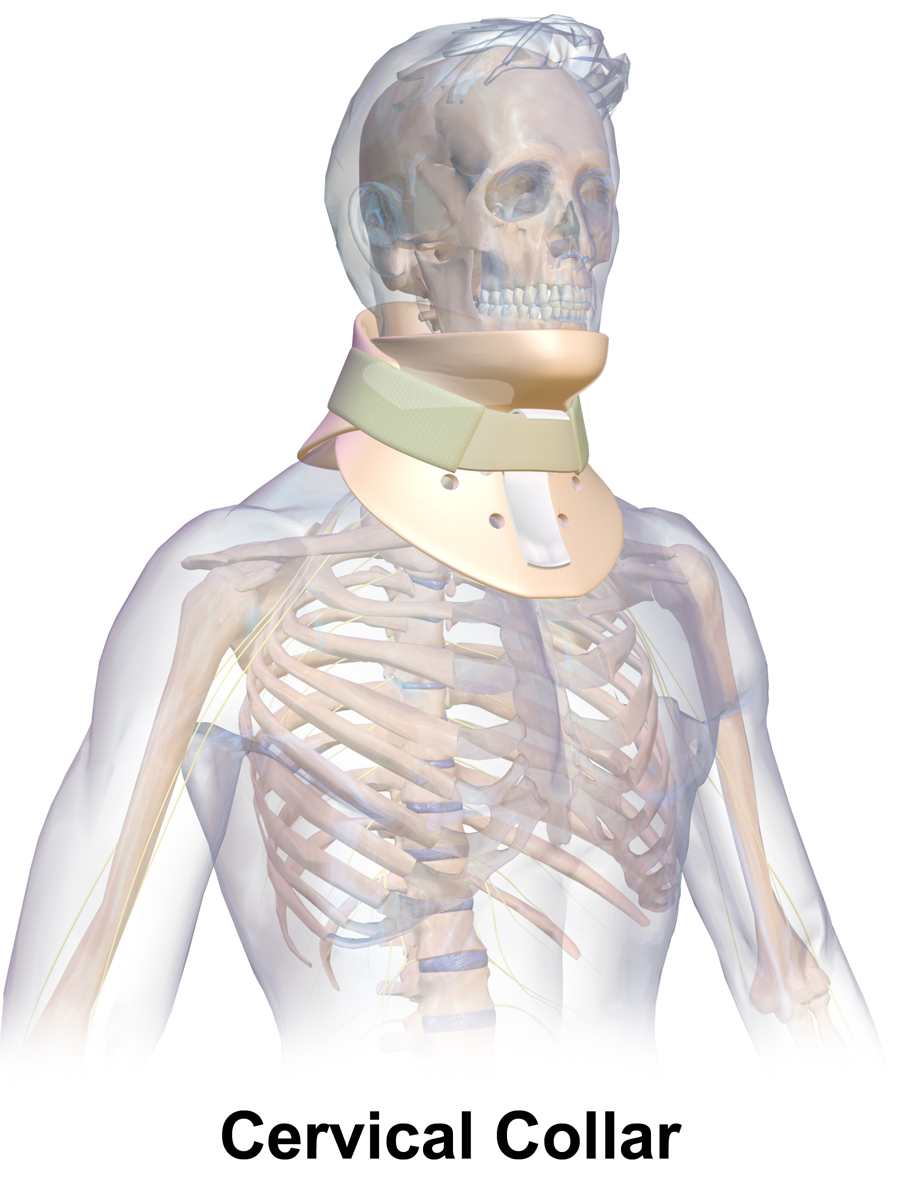
Cervical collar

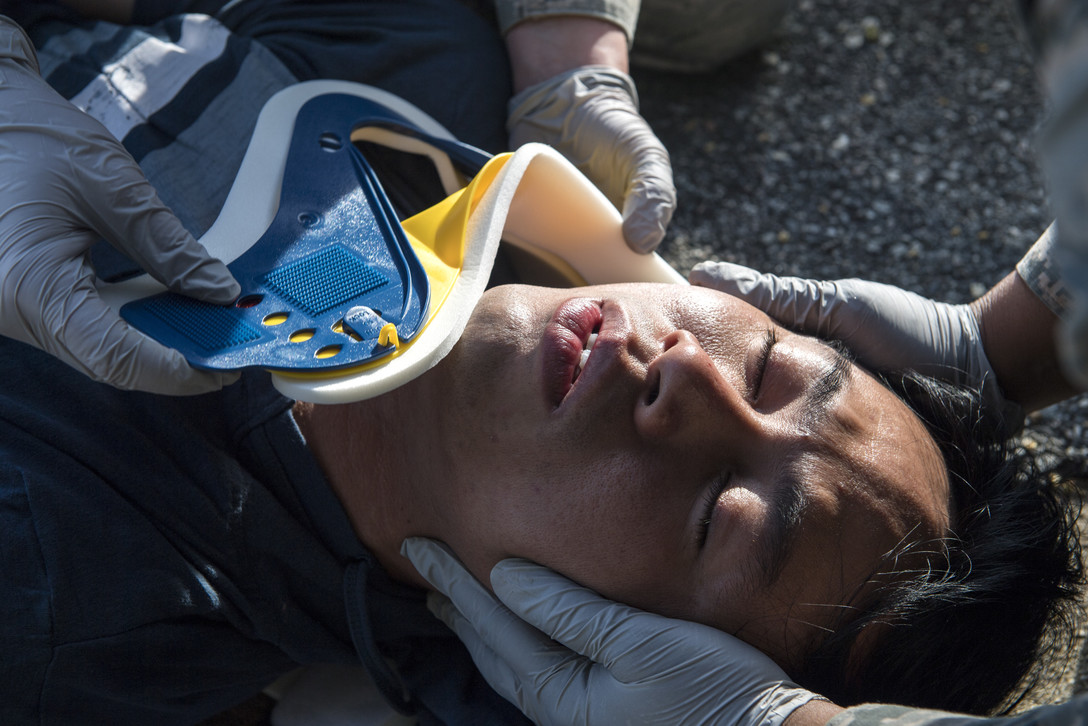
Neck collar attachment during a military simulation, replacing manual stabilization of the head

Woman wearing a Philadelphia cervical collar

== See also ==
- Vertebrae
- Orthotics
- Dental braces
- Orthopedic cast
- Kendrick Extrication Device
- Long spine board
- Halo (medicine)
- Spinal fusion
- Back brace
