= Logrolling (medicine) =

Maneuver used to safely get into and out of bed following spinal surgery

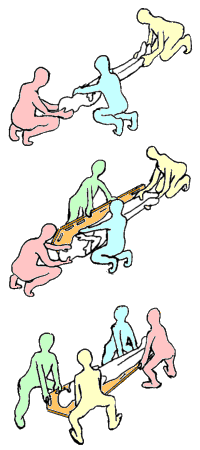
Log-rolling onto a spine board

In medicine, in particular, in emergency medicine, the log roll or logrolling is a maneuver used to move a patient without flexing the spinal column. The patient's legs are stretched, and the head is held so as to immobilize the neck.

Some sources recommend the patient's arms be crossed over the chest, while others suggest that in order to minimize the amount of lateral spinal displacement the arms ought to be stretched along the sides, with palms resting on the thighs.

After that, the patient is carefully rolled in the desired direction without twisting or bending the body.

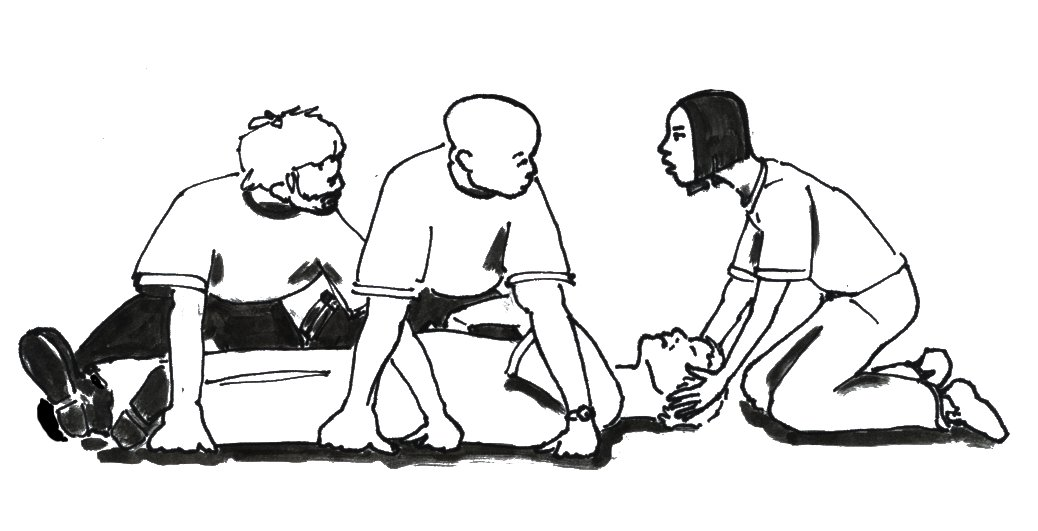
Log-rolling

Typically, logrolling into a supine position is used for transport of a casualty. Other cases include logrolling onto one side, e.g. to facilitate vomiting, or from side to side, for medical examination.

== See also ==
- Casualty lifting
