= Casualty lifting =

Procedures to lift someone onto a stretcher

Vertical lifting with five team members, the stretcher coming from the head's side

Casualty lifting is the first step of casualty movement, an early aspect of emergency medical care. It is the procedure used to put the casualty (the patient) on a stretcher.

Developed emergency services use lifting devices, such as scoop stretchers, that allow secured lifting with minimal personnel. Other methods (explained below) can be used when such devices are not available.

Since only stabilised casualties are moved (except in unusual circumstances), the lifting is usually never performed in emergency; emergency movements are sometimes performed to respect the Golden Hour. This depends on the organisation of the medical services and on the specific circumstances.

Maximum care must be taken to avoid to worsen an unstable trauma. The head-neck-chest axis must be kept straight to protect the spine, and the first responders must keep the patient's body stable (no movement of the feet) during the lift.

The first responders have to carry a heavy load (probably more than 20 kg for an adult casualty) in an uncomfortable position. There is thus a risk of injury to the carrier, especially of the lumbar back. To avoid an injury, they must push with their legs (quadriceps), trying to keep their back straight.

== Preparation of the stretcher ==
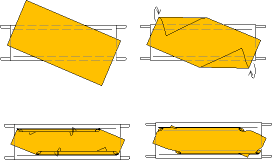
placing a blanket on a stretcher

The stretcher must be unfolded, and the hinges secured and tested: a first responder presses the cloth with their knee at several points. When a vacuum mattress is used, it must be put on the stretcher, and the balls must be evenly distributed. A blanket is often used since hypothermia is a major risk for a casualty. The blanket must be wrapped around the casualty to avoid the heat leak from below (this is not necessary when the stretcher has a mattress, e.g. a vacuum mattress, or in case of an ambulance stretcher). For this purpose, the blanket is put before the lifting, and folded in a specific way:

1. the blanket is laid so the diagonal is along the axis of the stretcher;
2. the corners are put on the centre of the stretcher;
3. the folded part are then rolled towards the stretcher;
4. the rolls are then put under the blanket, so they will not unroll spontaneously; the corners are sticking out so they can be pulled.

== Scoop stretcher ==
The use of a scoop stretcher allows a secure lifting with only two team members even in case of a spinal trauma. The use of this device is thus recommended for most operations.

However, in many situations, there is a lack not of people but of devices. Additionally, the scoop stretcher does not allow to maintain the legs up or a half-seated position for the casualty. For these reasons, the other methods are still taught.

== Vertical lift (straddle lift) ==
=== With five team members ===
Vertical lifting with five team members, the stretcher coming from the feet's side; the bottom illustration shows a view of the back of the casualty (from below), with the positions of the feet and of the hands of the first responders

Vertical lifting with five team members, the stretcher coming from the head's side

The most secured way to put a casualty on a stretcher is to use a vertical lift with five first responders including the chief (the procedure is called pont amélioré in French, pont refers to a gantry, amélioré means "enhanced"). The casualty is lifted by four first responders:

1. the chief has one knee down, one knee up, and holds the head; they can hold it by sliding the finger under the head, the palm placed on each side of the head; or they can place one hand under the neck and hold the occiput, the other hand under the chin;
2. the first team member supports themself on the shoulder of another team member, and steps over the casualty; they put their hands under the shoulders;
3. the second team member supports themself on the shoulder of another team member, and steps over the casualty; they put their hands under the hip;
4. the third team member hold the ankles;
5. the fourth team member pushes the stretcher.

The feet of the team members must be enough spaced so the stretcher can slide in between. If the chief uses the occipital-chin grip, the knee that is up is the knee on the side of the hand under the neck: as this arm supports the heaviest weight, it can supports itself on the knee.

Another method consists in placing the team members at both sides of the casualty and holding the cloths. The cloths must be strong enough.

On the order of the chief, the casualty is lifted, the stretcher is pushed, and the casualty is put down on the stretcher. During this procedure, the chief remains kneeling (stable); the other team members lift pushing with their legs (arms stretched out, back kept straight). Then, the first and second team members pull back, supporting themselves on the shoulder of a still standing member.

With this method, the movement of the casualty is minimal, just vertical.

When there is no room at the feet of the casualty for the stretcher, it must then be placed on the side of the head. The chief must then kneel aside. If he uses the occipital-chin grip, the hand under the neck must be the closest to the casualty's feet; the same knee is up.

=== With four team members ===
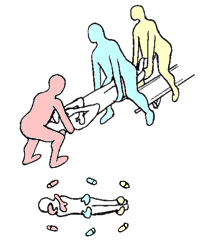
Vertical lifting with four team members, or "simple lifting"

With only four first responders, it is necessary to use a "simple" lift (pont simple in French): the chief plays the role of the first team member, stepping over the casualty and placing one hand under the neck, the other hand under the back, between the shoulder blades. The stretcher can come from the feet or from the head. This method is not adapted in case of suspicion of a spine trauma.

=== With two team members ===
When the casualty has no specific trauma, it is possible to slide a long spine board little by little. A team member lifts a part of the body (head, then shoulders, then hips), and the other one slide the board.

=== Lifting with a strap ===
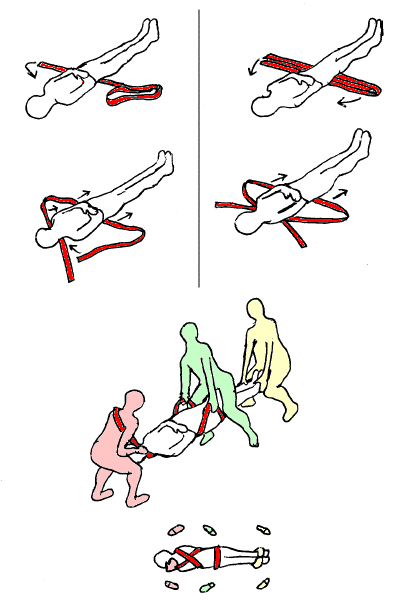
lifting with a strap

A handling strap can help the lifting. The strap for this use should be 6 m (20 ft) long, at least 3 cm (1.2 in) wide to share out the weight and avoid the pain, and resist at least to a weight of 150 kg (330 lb).

The strap is slid under the casualty: the flat profile can slide easily under the back and the pelvis without lifting the casualty. This strap will form two handles, thus, the team member at the pelvis will have a better grip and a vertical back; the strap crosses in the middle of the back, thus the team member at the head (lifting with four team members) or at the shoulders (lifting with five team members) does not have to put their arms between the shoulder blades, and can then lift with a vertical back. The verticality of the back of the team members is particularly important in case of an overweight casualty.

The strap can be put with two method:

- when the hollow of the back (just above the pelvis) is small (left picture), then the strap is slid in this hollow until its middle; then, each end is slid under the neck, the two branches of the strap are slid under the back, then the middle part is slid under the buttock;
- when the hollow of the back is enough high (right picture): the strap is folded in three, then slid in under the hollow of the back; the two extremities are slid towards the shoulders, and the middle part is slid under the buttocks.

Then, one extremity of the strap goes on a shoulder of the team member and under their opposite armpit (it crosses the back), and is tied to the other or held together by the team member; a hand is also put under the neck to support the head.

== Translation lift ==
Casualty lifting using the translation lift with four first responders

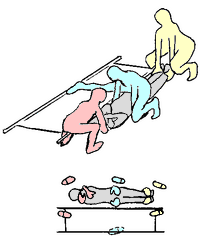
Casualty lifting using the translation lift with three first responders

The translation lift, or "Dutch" lift, is used when it is not possible to push the stretcher: there no room for the stretcher at the feet or head of the casualty, or the stretcher cannot slide/roll on the ground, or there are not enough first responders available. In such a case, the stretcher is placed besides the casualty.

With four first responders (including the chief), the first and second team members step over the casualty and the stretcher, the foot is on the farthest pole of the stretcher. The chief holds the closest pole with their knee on the ground, and the third team member with their ankle. The positions of the hands are the same as for the vertical lift with five first responders.

The first in place is the chief. The stretcher is slid besides the casualty, the pole against the thigh of the chief. Then, the third team member takes place. Once the both extremities of the pole are blocked, the other team members can step over the casualty (one by one, holding the others' shoulder to avoid falling) without any risk of rocking for the stretcher.

On the order of the chief, the casualty is lifted and translated on the stretcher.

This method can be performed with only three first responders. In this case, the chief plays the role of the first team member; blocking the pole with their ankle, and putting one hand under the neck, the other one under the back, between the shoulder blades. Only the team member at the hips steps over the stretcher.

== Rolling methods (log roll) ==
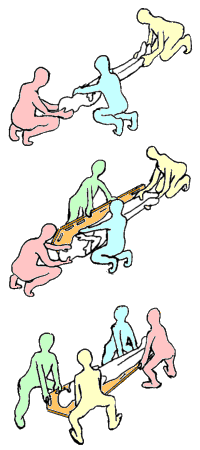
Casualty lifting: roll-and-lift method with a long spine board

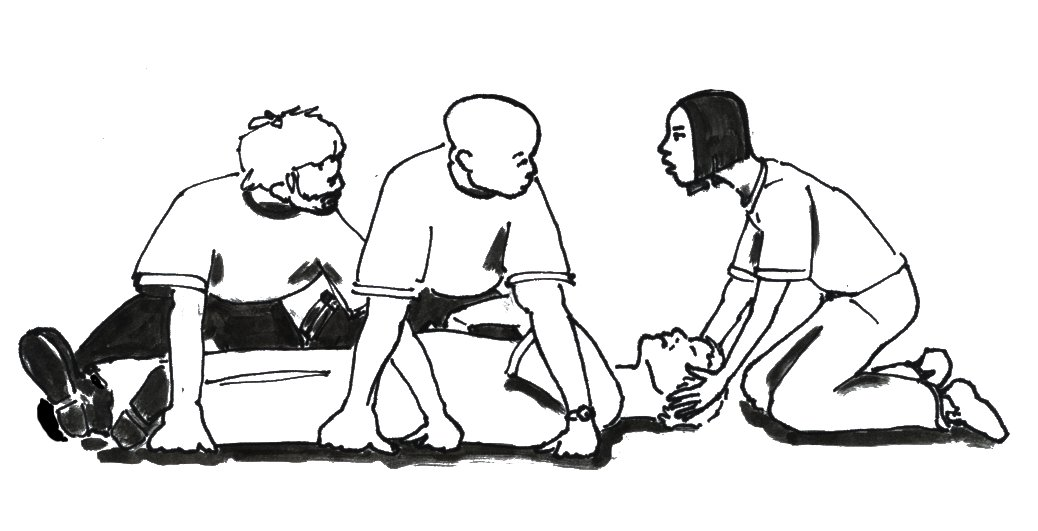
alternative for the position of the rescuers; note the arms that cross on the hips

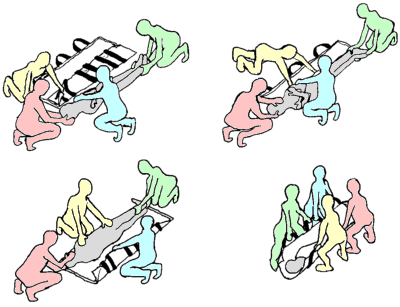
roll-and-lift with a flexible stretcher

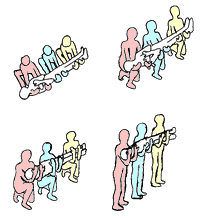
manual roll-and-lift method, or "spoon lifting", with three team members

The rolling methods can only be used on a casualty who does not have an unstable trauma. They are especially helpful for heavy weighted casualties: the rolling does not require much effort, and the lifting itself is done in a more comfortable position (the back of the first responders is vertical). They are also interesting when the casualty is in a very narrow place such as a pit or a ditch: the rolling allows sliding the lifting device (board, flexible stretcher, halves of the scoop stretcher).

The rolling methods consist in rolling the casualty on their side; it is then possible:

- to put a long spine board against their back, then to roll back the casualty on their back;
- to slide a folded flexible stretcher (or a blanket); the casualty is then rolled on the other side to unfold the flexible stretcher.

The casualty can then be lifted with the handles of the long spine board or of the flexible stretcher (or holding the rolled sides of the blanket), and put on the stretcher.

Usually, the method is done with four first responders, including the chief:

1. the chief is kneeling at the head, in the axis of the casualty, and holds the head;
2. the first team member is kneeling besides the casualty, and holds the opposite shoulder and the opposite hip;
3. the second team member is kneeling at the feet, in the axis of the victim, and holds the ankles;
4. at the order of the chief, the casualty is rolled towards the first team member, and the fourth team member puts the board or the flexible stretcher in place.

This method can be adapted to place a casualty on a vacuum mattress (see this article).

This method can also be performed by only two first responders: the chief plays the role of the first team member, and the only team member deals with the board (neither the head nor the ankles are gripped). This is rather traumatic for the casualty, but can be used when there is non suspicion of trauma, either in emergency (e.g. to transport a cardiac arrest when advanced life support cannot be performed on site), or when the first responders are lacking.

The method with a flexible stretcher was inspired by the method used to change the sheets of an impotent patient at the hospital. The flexible stretcher is placed beside the casualty, and a sheet is put on it. The third of the stretcher that is the closest to the casualty is folded on the middle third. The casualty is first rolled away from the stretcher, and the stretcher is slid against the back of the casualty. Then the casualty is put on their back and rolled on the other side; the stretcher and the sheet are unfolded. The casualty is wrapped into the sheet, and can be lifted with the handles of the flexible stretcher.

It is also possible to use a roll-and-lift method, or "spoon" lifting (relevage à la cuiller in French), with three people:

1. the first responders are placed on the same side of the casualty; the knee that is closest to the head is lifted, the other one is on the ground;
2. the chief is at the head; putting one arm under the neck and reaching the opposite shoulder, the other arm under the back;
3. the first team member is besides the pelvis; having one arm under the back, one arm under the back, the other one under the thighs;
4. the third team member supports the legs.

At the order of the chief, the casualty is lifted and put on the lifted knees of the first responders. Then, the casualty is flattened against the chests, and the first responders stand up. They move towards the stretcher; there, they put one knee on the ground (the closest to the casualty's feet), lay the casualty on his/her back, and move the casualty from their knees to the stretcher. For this last movement, additional first responders can be placed at the opposite side of the stretcher to help the landing.

The spoon lifting can also be used for emergency movements of a casualty when a spine trauma is suspected, e.g. the casualty is unconscious and is threatened by a fast rise of water level (flood).

== Seated person ==
Sometimes, it is necessary to lift a seated or half seated person: the seating position is adapted for a conscious person with a chest trauma or of respiratory difficulties.

For this, two team members are placed on each side of the casualty; they place one hand under the buttock, the other under the opposite armpit; the casualty places their arms around the neck of the team members. A third team member lifts the legs as usual, and a fourth pushes the stretcher.

When a heart problem is suspected, the casualty should not lift their arms. In this case, a short strap (4 m; 13 ft) can be used: one extremity is slid under the buttock, the other goes under each armpit (and thus crosses the back of the casualty); the extremities are tied to form a ring. The team members use this ring as handles; mind that the head of the casualty is not held.

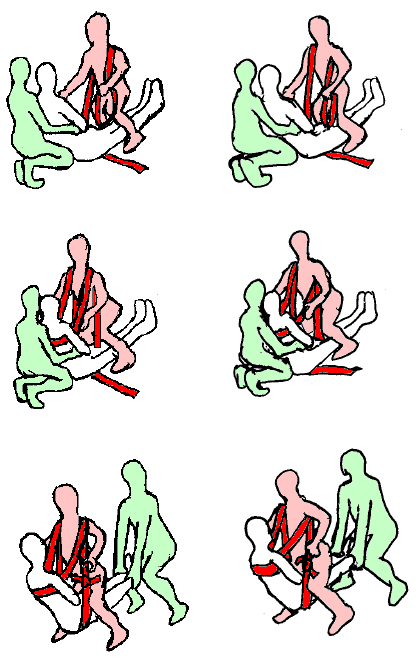
Lifting a seated casualty with a long strap

A long strap (6 m; 20 ft) allows the lifting with only three team members:

1. a short extremity is slid under the buttocks;
2. a team member is placed over the legs of the casualty, facing them; the long extremity goes under the team member's armpit and over their opposite shoulder;
3. this extremity then goes under the armpits of the casualty, and again under the team member's shoulder.

Both extremities are tied or held together by the team member; it makes a cross in the back of the first responder. The team member can then support the hole weight of the top of the casualty's body while keeping a vertical back.

the long extremity goes on the team member's shoulder and under their opposite armpit; then this extremity then goes under the armpits of the casualty, and again on the team member's shoulder.

With this possibility, all the weight is on one shoulder; it can be interesting when the first responder has a loose foothold on one side, or has a problem with one shoulder but cannot be replaced by another team member.

When the casualty is seating on a chair and the seated position (with legs down) is possible (i.e. no problem of blood circulation), and if the chair has fixed legs and cannot be folded, then the chair itself can be used for the transport. Otherwise, the chair can be replaced by a wheelchair or a stretcher:

1. two team members take place besides the casualty as usual;
2. when they lift, a third team member re-removes the chair;
3. he/she then puts the wheelchair, or deals with the causality's legs as a fourth team member pushes the stretcher.

In some cases, the casualty is found seated but a spine trauma is suspected (e.g. the casualty sat upright after an accident, or fell in this position). In this case, the casualty must be transported lying; a long spine board is put against their back to support it while they are laid down. When the casualty is on a chair, then the board is slid between the back of the casualty and the back of the chair, and the chair is laid down; a Kendrick extrication device (KED) may be used in this context.

== See also ==
- Casualty movement
- Patient lift
