= Stabilization (medicine) =

Process to prevent shock in injured people

Stabilization is a process to help prevent a sick or injured person from having their medical condition deteriorate further so that they can be treated. Examples include while the person is waiting for medical treatment and in the intensive care unit.

Stabilization is often performed by the first person to arrive on scene, EMTs, or nurses, before or just after arrival in the hospital. It includes controlling bleeding, arranging for proper evacuation, keeping patients warm with blankets, and calming them by providing personal attention and concern for their well-being. Stabilization is also often an important principle of care in an ICU.

It is particularly important in trauma cases where spinal injury is suspected to immobilize the cervical spine or back. Failure to do so can cause permanent paralysis or death. In the field, spinal stabilization involves moving the person's back as a single unit with as many as five rescuers assisting, then applying a cervical collar (which can be improvised from duct tape and cardboard), and securing the victim to a solid-backed stretcher, long spine board, or vacuum mattress.

Search and rescue technicians trained in wilderness first aid have a protocol for verifying that the spine has not been injured (clearing the cervical spine) when the victim is several hours or more from the hospital, and evacuation may not be indicated. Without this technique, it may be necessary to carry a suspected trauma victim out only to discover that he had no injury worthy of the effort and expense.
