= Scoop stretcher =

Device used for moving injured people

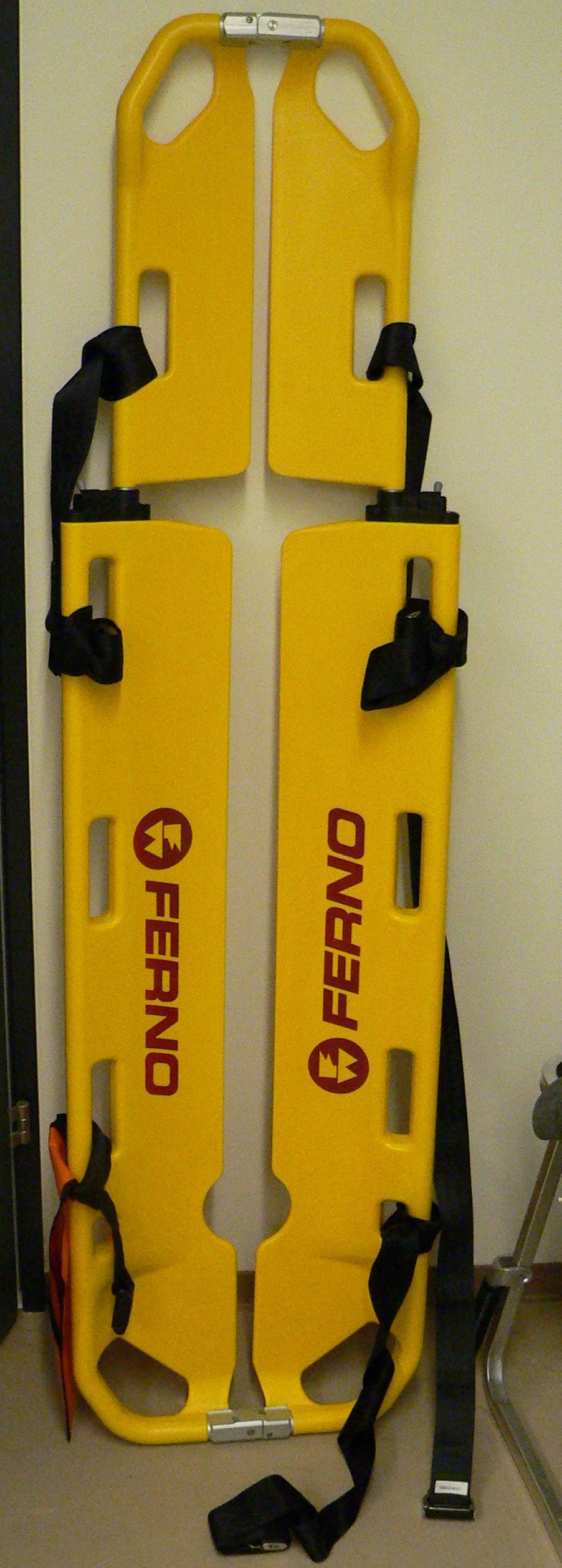
A scoop stretcher. Note that the stretcher is upside down: the narrow end of the stretcher is for the patient's legs and feet.

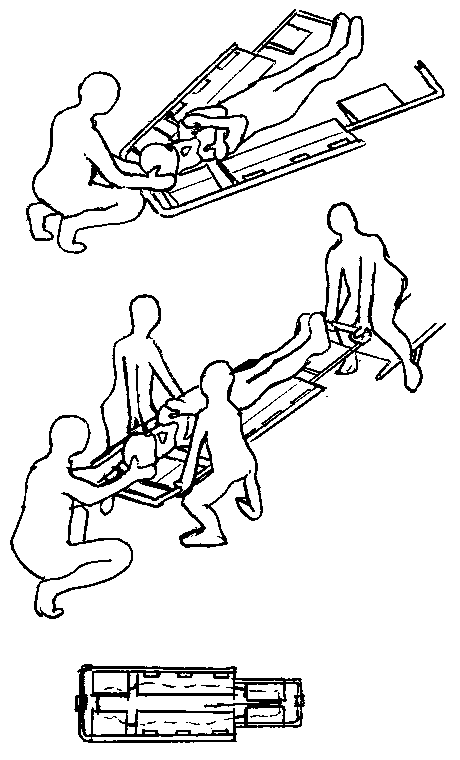
Top: positioning the scoop stretcher; middle: casualty lifting with five team members (one is pushing the normal stretcher); bottom: view from below)

The scoop stretcher (or clamshell, Roberson orthopedic stretcher, or just scoop) is a device used specifically for moving injured people. It is ideal for carrying casualties with possible spinal injuries.

== Structure ==
A scoop stretcher has a structure that can be split vertically into two parts, with shaped 'blades' towards the centre which can be brought together underneath a patient. The two halves are placed separately either side of the patient, and then brought together until securing clips at the top and bottom both engage.

== Benefits ==
Scoop stretchers reduce the chance of undesirable movement of injured areas during transfer of a trauma patient, as they maintain the patient in a supine alignment during transfer to a stretcher, vacuum mattress or long spine board). They are more comfortable than a long spine board for transport.

== Limitations ==
The scoop stretcher can be used for patient transport, provided the patient is strapped. However, the ninth edition of the ATLS Student Course Manual advises against using scoop stretchers for patient transport. For comfort and safety reasons, it is recommended to transfer the patient to a vacuum mattress instead, in which case the scoop stretcher is put on the transport device and then opened.
