= Splint (medicine) =

Medical restraint to keep body part in place

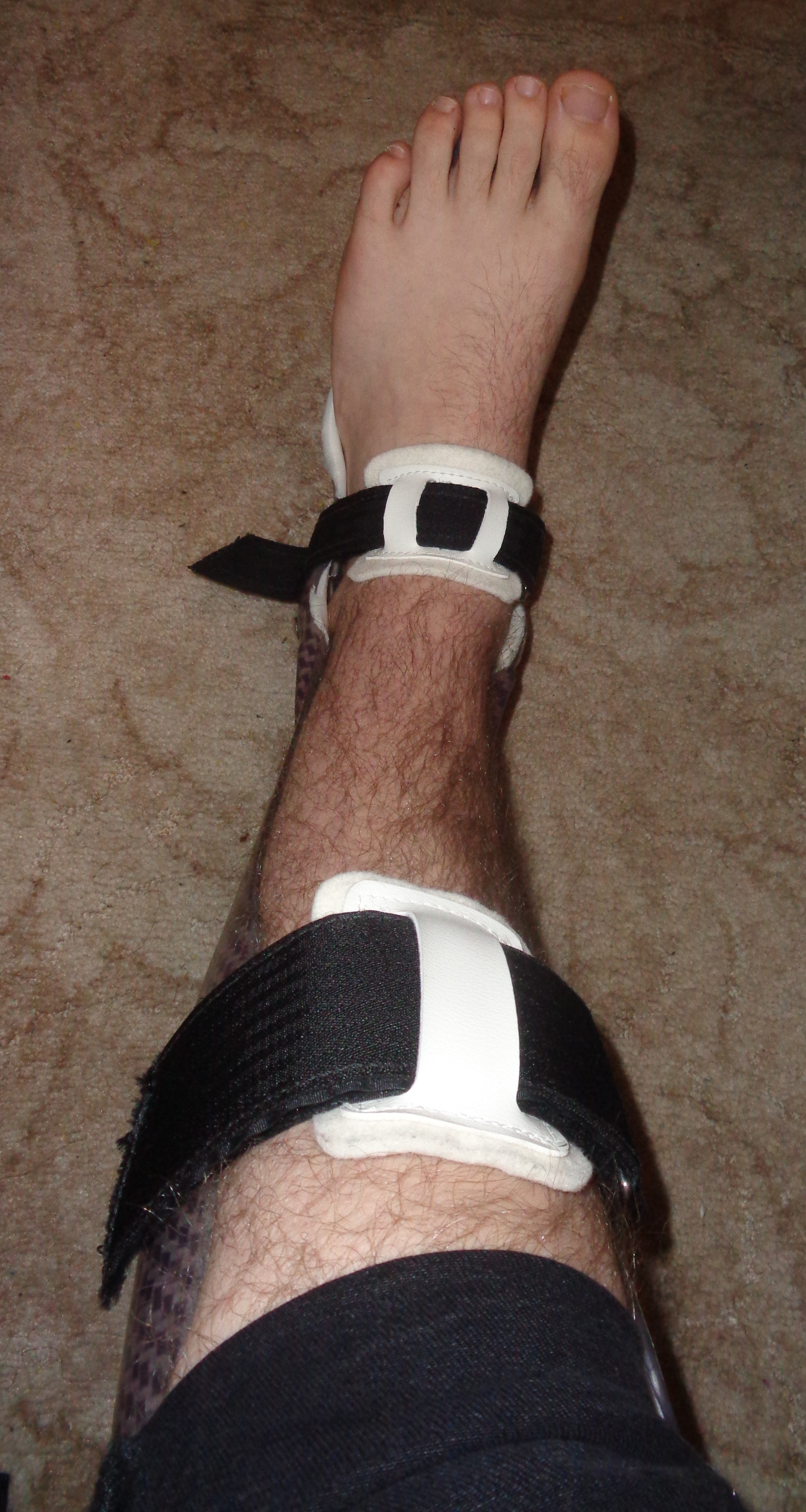
- An ankle foot orthosis (AFO), a type of splint used to support the foot and ankle.
- Specialty: Orthopedics

A splint is defined as "a rigid or flexible device that maintains in position a displaced or movable part; also used to keep in place and protect an injured part" or as "a rigid or flexible material used to protect, immobilize, or restrict motion in a part". Splints can be used for injuries that are not severe enough to immobilize the entire injured structure of the body. For instance, a splint can be used for certain fractures, soft tissue sprains, tendon injuries, or injuries awaiting orthopedic treatment. A splint may be static, not allowing motion, or dynamic, allowing controlled motion. Splints can also be used to relieve pain in damaged joints. Splints are quick and easy to apply and do not require a plastering technique. Splints are often made out of some kind of flexible material and a firm pole-like structure for stability. They often buckle or Velcro together.

== Uses ==
Capener finger splint

- By the emergency medical services or by volunteer first responders, to temporarily immobilize a fractured limb before transportation;
- By allied health professionals such as occupational therapists, physiotherapists and orthotists, to immobilize an articulation (e.g. the knee) that can be freed while not standing (e.g. during sleep);
- By athletic trainers to immobilize an injured bone or joint to facilitate safer transportation of the injured person; or
- By emergency department (ED) physicians to stabilize fractures or sprains until follow-up appointment with an orthopedist.

== Types ==
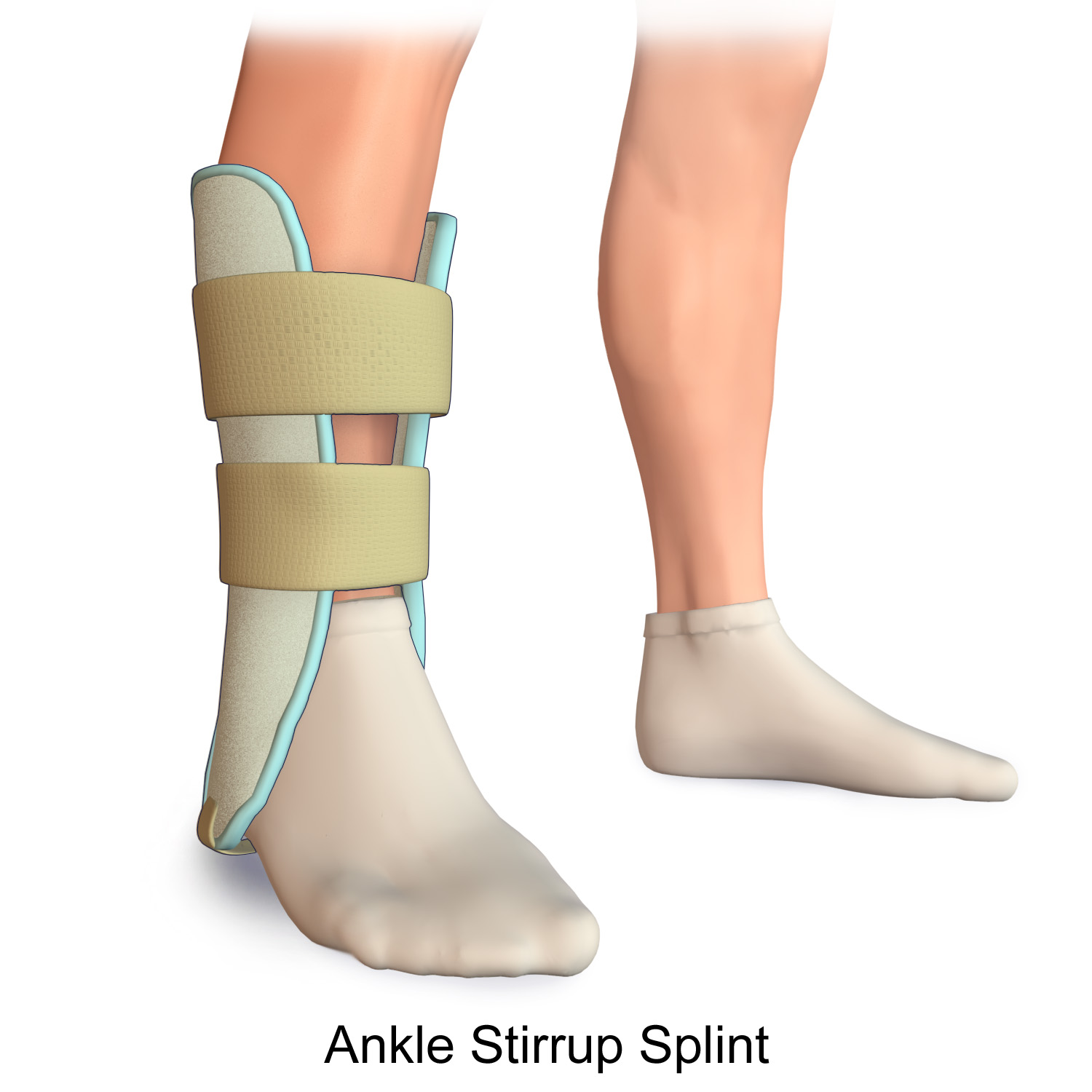
Illustration of an Ankle Stirrup Splint

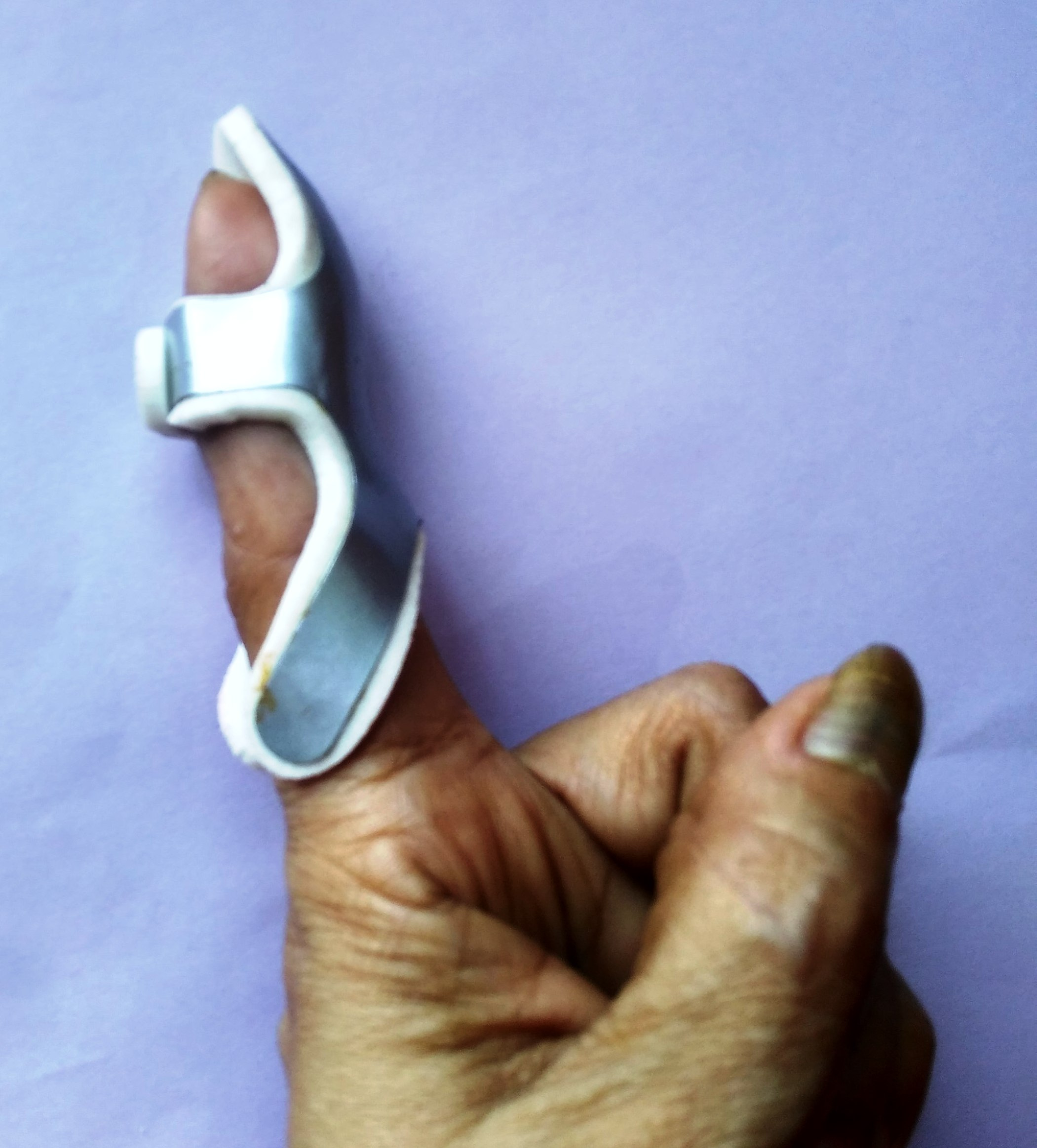
Finger splint

- Ankle stirrup – Used for the ankles.
- Finger splints – Used for the fingers. A "mallet" or baseball finger is a rupture of the extensor tendon and sometimes including a fracture. While surgery may be necessary such an injury may heal if placed in a finger splint.
- Nasal splint
- Posterior lower leg
- Posterior full leg
- Posterior elbow
- Sugar tong – Used for the forearm or wrist. They are named "sugar-tong" due to their long, U-shaped characteristics, similar to a type of utensil used to pick up sugar cubes.
- Thumb spica – Used for the thumb.
- Ulnar gutter – Used for the forearm to the palm.
- Volar wrist splint – Used for the wrist.
- Wrist/arm splint – Used for the wrist or arm.

== History ==
=== B.C. to A.D. ===
Splinting has been used since ancient times. Evidence suggests that splint usage dates back to 1500 B.C. that could treat not only fractures but burns as well. These splints were made from materials like, "leaves, reeds, bamboo, and bark padded with linen … [and] copper." Mummies from Egypt have been uncovered wearing splints from previous injuries that were obtained in their lifetime. Hippocrates, alive from 460 to 377 B.C., was very well known for his discoveries and techniques for splinting. He created a "distraction splint" that was advanced for his time. The splint, made up of leather cuffs that were separated by slim wooden slats, worked to repair the fracture and realign the bones. Around 1000 A.D. the use of Hippocrates' splinting technique using plants, like palm branches and cane halves, continued to be practiced. Flour dust, egg whites, and vegetable mixtures were created to form plaster for creating splints. Most splints in ancient times were cast-like and made to immobilize an area of the body. This is illustrated by the Aztecs around 1400 A.D. They made splints with leaves, leather, and paste.

=== 1500s ===
In the early 1500s, the introduction of gunpowder to Europe caused a serious decline in the armour-making market. Armourers had to find ways to earn a living using the skills they had already acquired. This led to the creation of braces, given the common use of metal in their construction. Armourers were knowledgeable about exterior anatomy and joint alignment, so making braces was an obvious alternative to making armour. By 1517, injuries were being treated with metal braces secured by screws, following the evolution of the armour trade. Fast forward to 1592, the first written piece on splints, by surgeon Hieronymus Fabricius, shows various drawings of splints resembling armour for the whole body.

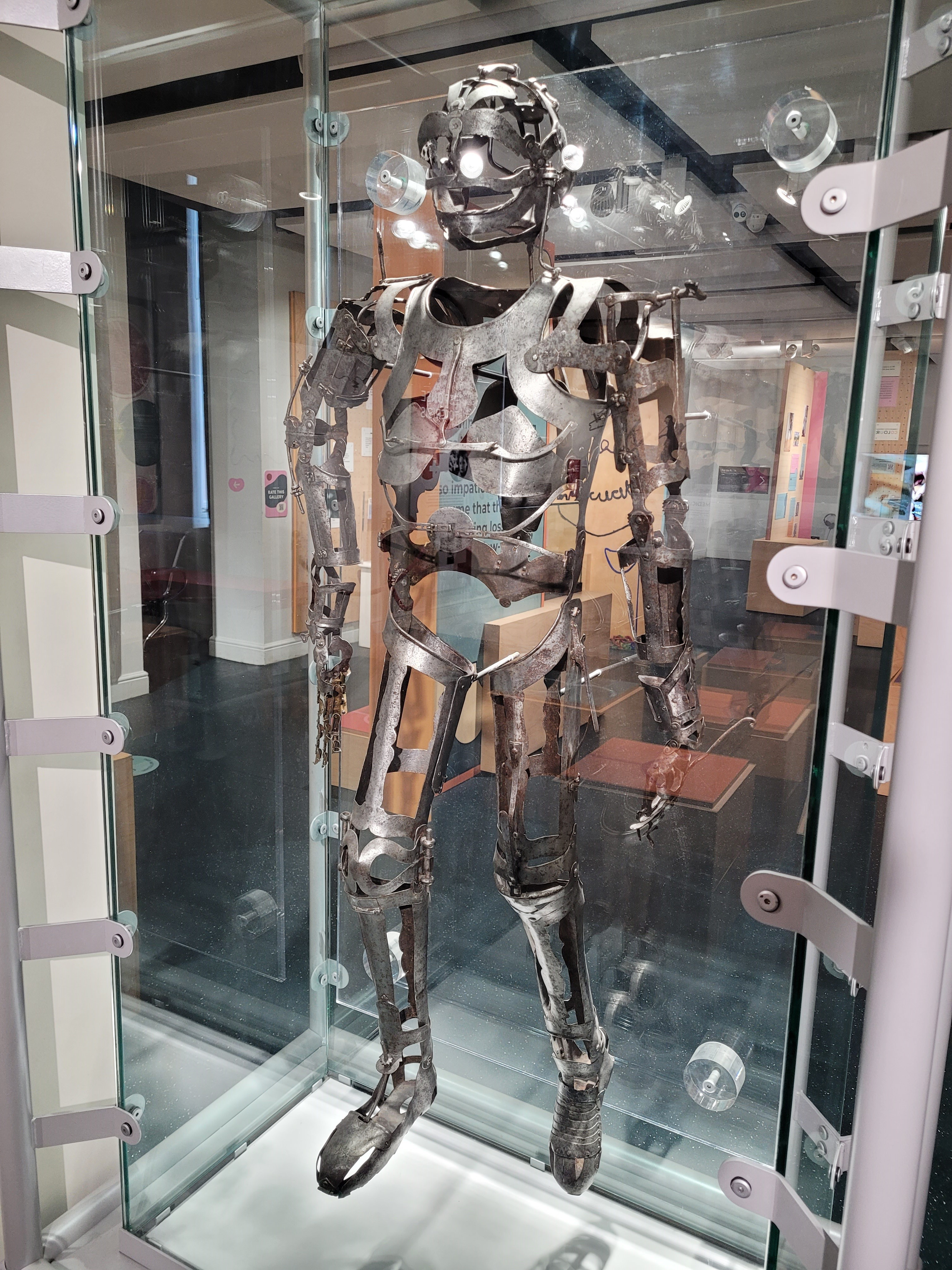
Correction frame made by a German armourer in 1665 to teach and demonstrate different splints and supports.

=== 1700s–1800s ===
In the mid-1700s, doctors and mechanics collaborated to create splints for specific injuries. Surgeons need these mechanics to design and construct the splints for their patients. Most splints were made of metal. Plaster of Paris, a white powdery substance used mainly for casts and molds in the form of a quick-setting paste with water, began to be used for immobilizing splints. This method was not a popular way of splinting as it took too long to set and harden, and suitable fabric was scarce.

In the 1800s, it was beginning to be recognized that rehabilitation after an injury was important. Orthopaedics began to develop as a distinct field from general surgery. A Welsh surgeon, Hugh Owen Thomas, created speciality splints that were cheap and best for injuries that were being rehabilitated. By 1883, mechanics and surgeons separated due to class issues. This created two different areas that shaped the way braces were being created and distributed. Around 1888, F. Gustav Ernst, a dedicated mechanic, released a book illustrating upper body splints. In 1899, orthopaedic surgeon Alessandro Codivilla followed suit and published a book explaining the importance of using surgical procedures to achieve better results using splints.

== See also ==
- SAM splint
- Traction splint
- Vacuum splint
- Cervical collar
- Kendrick extrication device
- Long spine board
- Orthopedic surgery
- Buddy wrapping
- PASG (Pneumatic Anti-Shock Garment)
