= Casualty movement =

Medical transport techniques

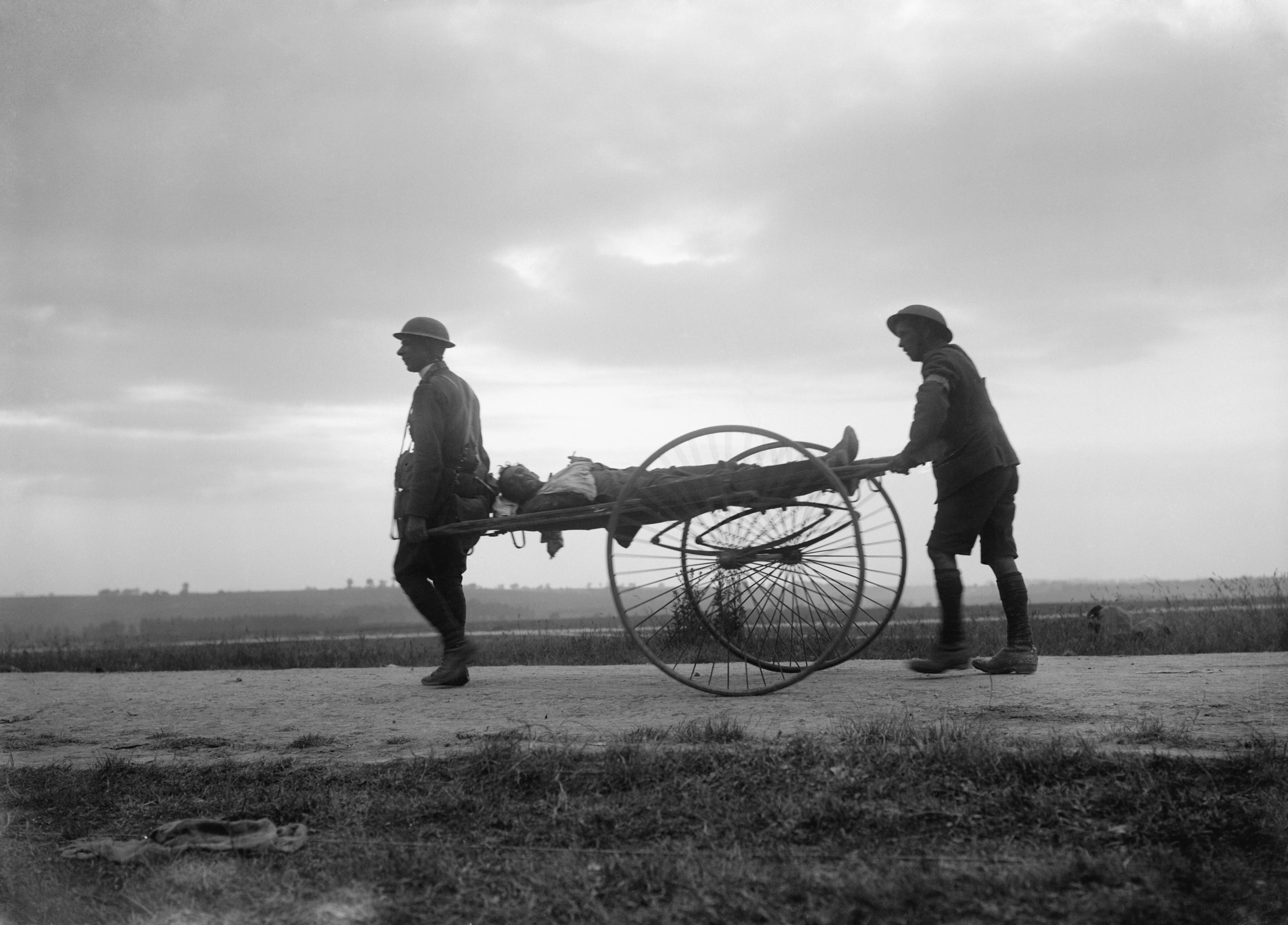
A casualty being moved with a wheeled stretcher during World War I

Casualty movement is the collective term for the techniques used to move a casualty from the initial location (street, home, workplace, wilderness, battlefield) to the ambulance.

In wilderness or combat conditions, it may first be necessary to stabilize the patient prior to moving them to avoid causing further injury. In such situations, evacuation may involve carrying the victim some distance on improvised stretchers, a travois, or other improvised carrying gear.

Spinal immobilization is necessary if there is a likelihood of head or spinal injury.

Once the patient is ready to be moved, the first step is the casualty lifting, to put them on a stretcher or litter (rescue basket). The final step is the patient transfer from the ambulance to the hospital.

The use of wheeled stretchers, usually used in most developed emergency services, does not need much explanation, except that great care must be taken in order to avoid aggravating an unstable trauma.

== See also ==
- CASEVAC
- MEDEVAC
