= Ked =

Ked or KED may refer to:

- Ked, Rajasthan, India
- Kendrick extrication device, to extricate people from crashed vehicles
- Hippoboscidae or keds, parasitic flies
- The Korea Economic Daily, South Korea

== See also ==
- Keds, American shoe brand
