= Vacuum mattress =

Device used for patient immobilisation

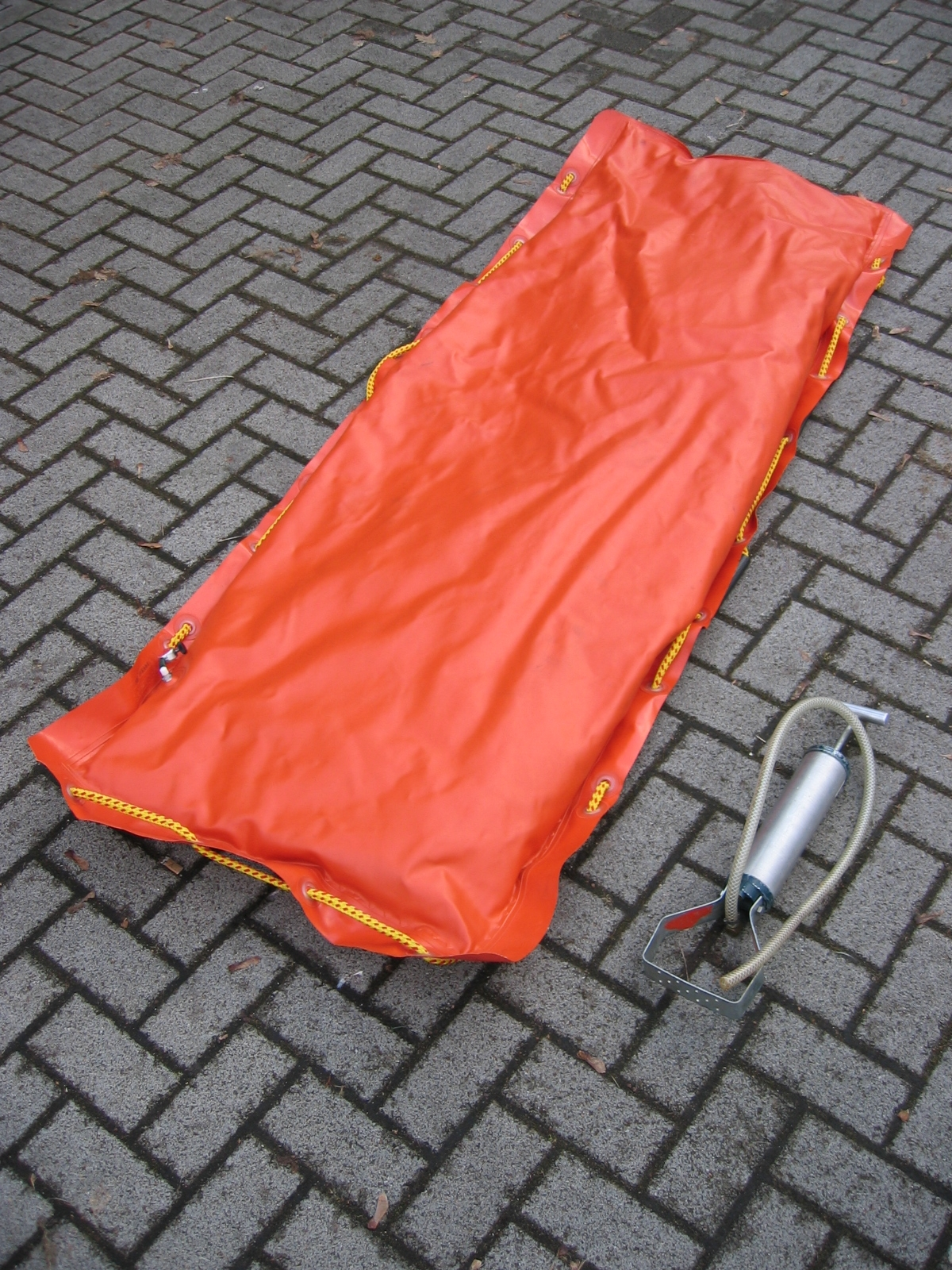
- Vacuum mattress and its manual pump

A vacuum mattress, or vacmat, is a medical device used for the immobilisation of patients, especially in case of a vertebra, pelvis or limb trauma (especially for femur trauma). It is also used for manual transportation of patients for short distances (it replaces the stretcher). It was invented by Loed and Haederlé, who called it "shell" mattress (matelas coquille in French).

== Medical uses ==
The full spine immobilisation (splint) is performed with: a rigid cervical collar, a vacuum mattress and a stretcher under it (the longitudinal stiffness of the mattress alone is not sufficient).

=== Preparation of the vacuum mattress ===
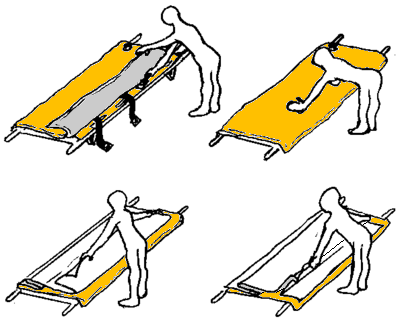
Preparation of the vacuum mattress

The vacuum mattress is put on a stretcher or possibly on a long spine board. The straps are put under the mattress, along its side, so they do not reach the ground. Then, the polystyrene balls are distributed evenly through the mattress by shaking its surface. (A section with fewer balls would be less rigid; conversely, if balls are concentrated at any given point, this becomes more rigid.) A sheet is put on the mattress, folded so it will be possible to pull it to wrap the casualty into using an S-fold and finally a team member should double-check the pump (manual or electrical) is set to either pump air out of the bag.

=== Moulding the mattress ===
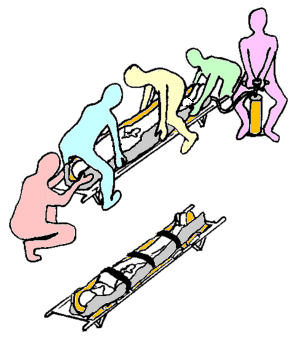
Moulding of the vacuum mattress

There are three ways to put the casualty on the vacuum mattress:

- lifting the casualty and pushing the stretcher under it. This method requires a minimum of five team members (four lifting and one pushing the stretcher) and should be used when a spine or a pelvis trauma are suspected;
- the casualty is lifted with a scoop stretcher. The scoop stretcher is put on the mattress and opened to release the casualty;
- the casualty is lifted on a long spine board. The board is put on the mattress and the casualty is lifted (best with four team members) and one team member removes the board.

In all cases, the vacuum valve is up and at the feet of the casualty.

Once the casualty is on the mattress, the sheet is wrapped around him/her and the sides of the mattress are folded against their body. The top of the head must be kept clear (the mattress could retract when pumping out the air and thus compress the spine). The air is pumped until the mattress is rigid, then the valve is closed and the straps are fastened.

When only three team members are available and there is no scoop stretcher, the following procedure can be used:

- The vacuum mattress is put besides the casualty, on a protecting ground sheet, and partially depressed (through manual pumping) to make it more rigid and thinner. A sheet is put on the mattress, closer to the casualty.
- The casualty is put on their side, with a procedure that is similar to the recovery position.
- The team member at the legs pushes the mattress against the back of the casualty. The ground sheet helps to slide the mattress on the floor.
- The casualty is put on their back, overlapping the side of the mattress.
- The casualty is centred on the mattress; the sheet helps sliding the casualty on the mattress.
- The straps are tied to mould the mattress. The team leader moulds the sides of the head manually.
- The air is pumped.
- A long spine board is placed along the axis of the mattress. Two team members face each other and hold the mattress's handles at the head and at the thighs. They lift a few centimetres, the ground sheet is removed and the board is slid under the mattress to ensure longitudinal rigidity.
- The board can then be lifted (with the mattress on it), and put on the stretcher.

While the lifting methods can induce a flexing of the spine, this rolling method can be hazardous for several reasons: the risk of a torsion of the spine when rolling, the risk when sliding the casualty on the mattress, the risk of anteversion of the hips (and thus of flexing of the spine) due to the weight of the legs when lifting the mattress to slide the board.

== Advantages and disadvantages ==
The vacuum mattress is an alternative to the use of a long spine board. Its advantages are:

- Comfort
- Being adaptable to all traumas (included spinal and femoral traumas)
- The patient is held more securely.
- The patient is more easily transported short distances provided sufficient team members (typically six) are available, and in confined spaces compared to a conventional stretcher.
- Distributes pressure more equally on body surfaces, leading to lower risk for pressure ulcer formation compared to a long board

Its drawbacks include:

- Relatively fragile (useless unless a perfect vacuum is maintained)
- Increased cost relative to a traditional long spine board
- The time taken to evacuate the bag compared to readily available standard spinal board.

== Operation ==
A vacuum mattress consists of a sealed air-tight (typically polymer) bag enclosing small beads (typically polystyrene balls) and fitted with one or more valves. While at ambient air pressure, the beads free to move, but when the mattress has been moulded and the air evacuated, external atmospheric pressure locks the beads in place (jamming) and the mattress becomes rigid.

When used medically, this principle allows a patient who is put onto the mattress (e.g. with a scoop stretcher), with the sides of the mattress arranged around the patient. When the air inside is evacuated, the mattress forms a conformal cradle allowing an injury to be stabilised, straps fastened, and the patient protected sufficiently well that they can be transported.

For this reason the bag is typically bigger than an adult human body (though the same principle may be employed to create an 'instant' cast to stabilise an injured limb). In use, a sheet is usually put on the vacuum mattress to:

- Protect the mattress from penetration, preserving the integrity of the air-tight bag (The casualty may have broken glass on their clothes or be wearing jewellery that might puncture the mattress.)
- Avoid direct contact of the skin with plastic (The patient may be releasing body fluids.)
- Assist in transferring the patient at the emergency room

== See also ==
- Vacuum splint
