= Vacuum splint =

Device used as a temporary splint

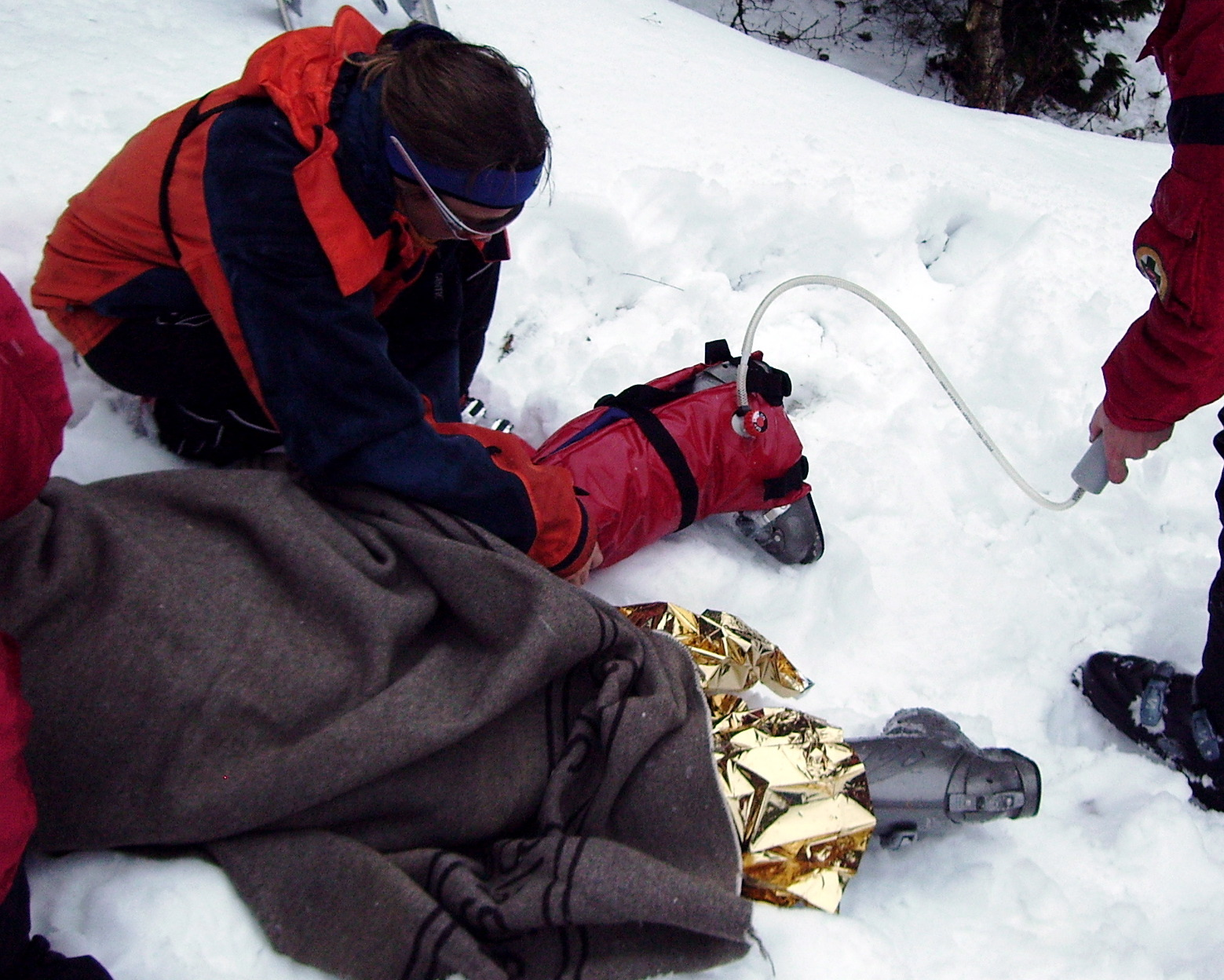
Vacuum splint being applied to the leg of an injured skier

A vacuum splint is a device like a small vacuum mattress that is used in emergency medicine as a temporary splint. Vacuum splints operate by extracting air from the splint itself to enable the thousands of polystyrene balls inside the splint to mold around the injured body part similar to an orthopedic cast. Vacuum splints are primarily used by paramedics to splint trauma-related injuries, joint dislocation, subluxation, and extremity fractures.

Advantages of the vacuum splint include the ability to provide support whilst relieving pressure at the injury site and the ability to conform to any shape. The limb may also be X-rayed with the splint on.
