= Neil Robertson stretcher =

Type of medical stretcher

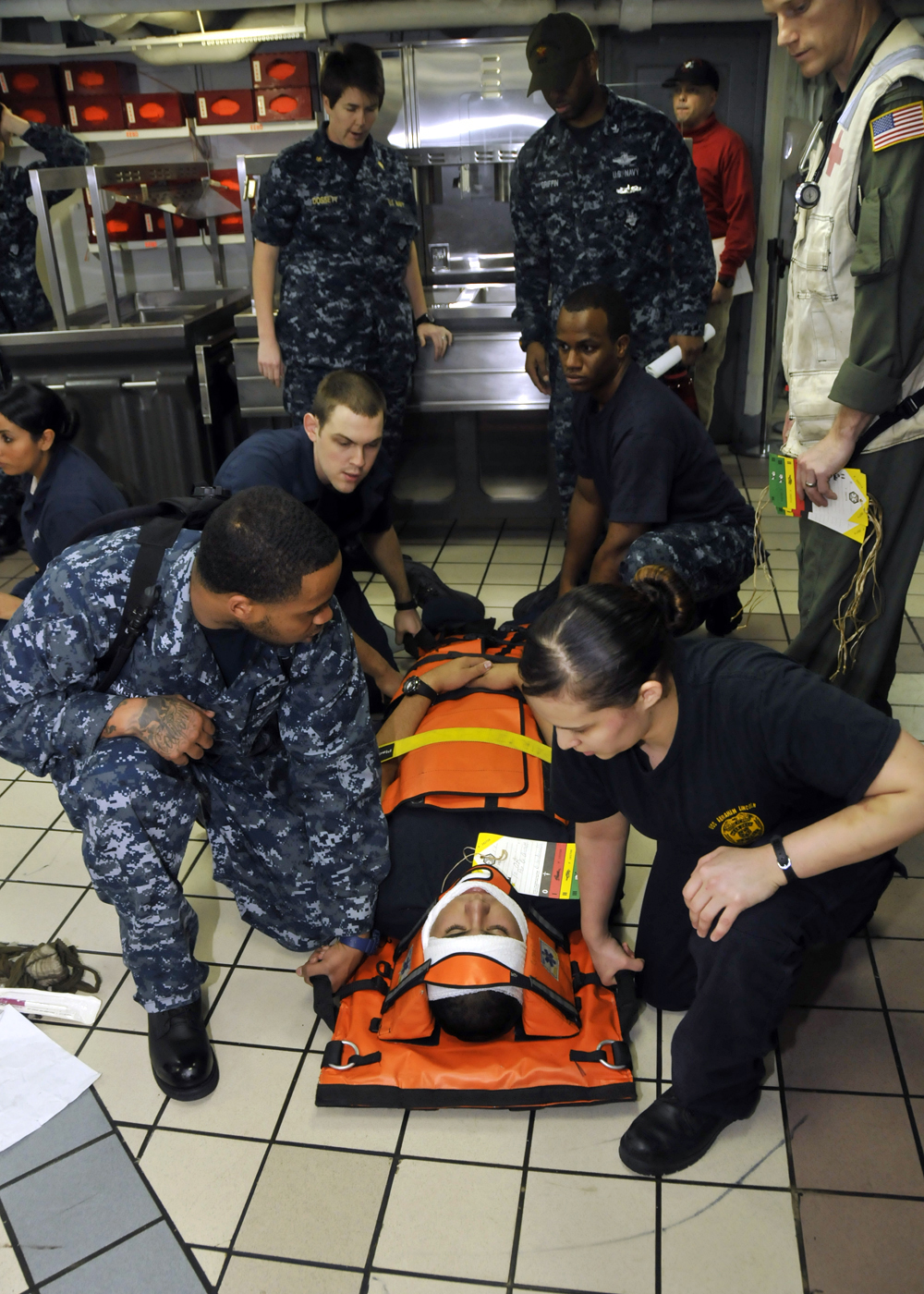
- A sailor with a simulated injury being moved in a stretcher similar to the Neil Robertson stretcher

A Neil Robertson stretcher (NRS) is a type of rescue stretcher designed for the purpose of safely transferring an injured person by either lowering or lifting them to a place of safety. It is constructed from wooden slats and canvas. It features the patient being wrapped in canvas and secured using robust canvas straps, with a lifting rope affixed to a head-mounted ring and a guideline tied near the ankles, serving to halt the stretcher's movement. It has been utilized by the Royal Navy for nearly a century. The Neil Robertson stretcher has been widely adopted in Australia and other countries, and has been credited with reducing the risk of further injury to patients during transport.

The Neil Robertson stretcher (NRS) is believed to have been influenced by a Japanese stretcher made from bamboo. The NRS was designed with the purpose of packaging casualties into a compact form, allowing for rescue operations in spaces with limited openings and facilitating movement through vertical escape hatches while minimizing slippage. However, the flexibility of the NRS, which can be advantageous in many situations, has raised concerns about its suitability for rescuing individuals with spinal injuries.

The Neil Robertson stretcher is widely used in maritime settings, particularly by naval forces and maritime rescue team. During World War I, the NRS (Neil Robertson stretcher) gained widespread use as the Royal Navy employed it for evacuating casualties from navy vessels that presented significant challenges due to narrow passages and confined spaces, making conventional stretchers impractical for such scenarios. As a result, the wounded were either manually carried or transported using the Neil-Robertson stretcher, which provided secure envelopment for easy maneuverability through steep ladders, small hatchways, and narrow passages. Additionally, the Neil-Robertson stretcher offered the advantage of doubling as a splint.

Unlike some modern counterparts used in cave or field rescues, the NRS was not originally designed to be used in conjunction with other extraction devices such as half boards. However, supporters of the stretcher argue that when used properly and in conjunction with other spinal immobilization techniques, it can be an effective tool for protecting patients with suspected spinal injuries during transport.
