= Patient transport =

Conveying ill or injured individuals from one place to another

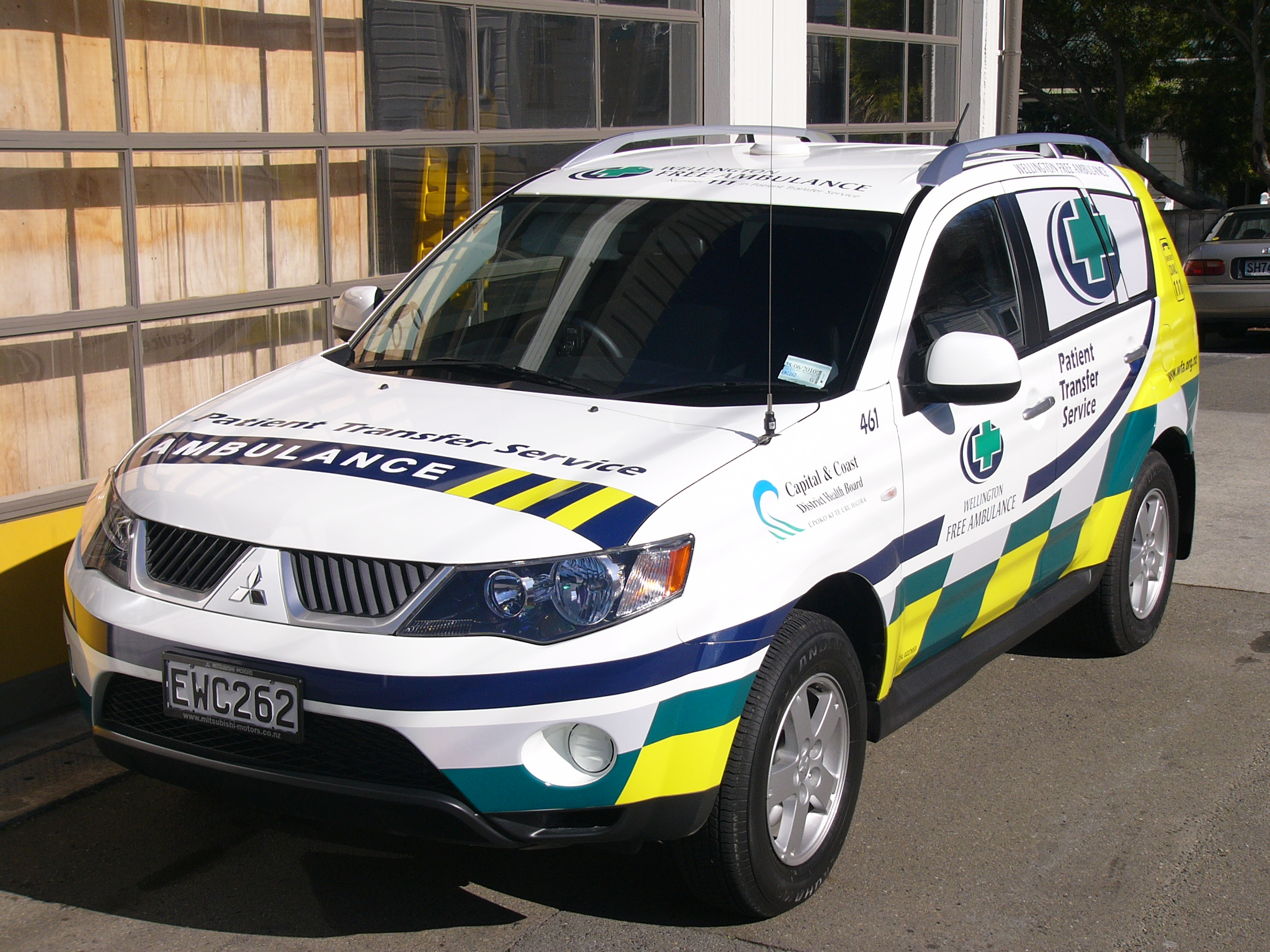
Patient transport vehicle in New Zealand.

Patient transport is a service that transfers patients to and from medical facilities in non-emergency situations.

In emergency situations, patients are transported by the emergency medical services. Non-emergency patient transport is sometimes run by the same agency. It is typically provided to a patient who needs to be transferred to a facility that can provide a higher or more specialised level of care, though emergency services may be summoned if this is urgent. It may also be used to transfer patients from a specialised facility to a local hospital or nursing home when they no longer require this specialised care, such as following successful cardiac catheterisation due to a heart attack. Some countries also offer the service to patients who cannot make their own way to or from the hospital.

== United States ==
Patient transport services are provided in the United States to convey patients to hospitals. The vehicles used are not usually (although there are exceptions) equipped with life-support equipment and are usually crewed by staff with fewer qualifications than the crew of emergency ambulances. Their purpose is simply to transport patients to, from, or between places of treatment. The vehicle is called an ambulette. These services are often provided by ambulance services using non-emergency vehicles but may be subject to tendering processes.

== United Kingdom ==
Patient transport services in the United Kingdom were generally provided by ambulance services after the establishment of the NHS, and originally all emergency ambulance crews began as patient transport drivers. Since the establishment of the NHS internal market in 1990, these services have often been contracted to private providers such as HTG-UK.

Patient transport service is a separate provision from the Hospital Travel Costs scheme, which is means tested, to fund low-income patients' journeys to hospital. Clinical commissioning groups (CCG) often arranged for one CCG to manage the tendering and contracting process for a wide area.

Cornwall CCG proposed to restrict this provision for dialysis patients for those who did not have specific medical or financial reasons in 2018 but changed their minds after a campaign led by Kidney Care UK and decided to fund transport for patients requiring dialysis three times a week for a minimum of six weeks, or six times a month for a minimum of three months.

After a string of market failures, NHS England announced a review into the cost of patient transport services and the way they are commissioned in October 2019.

The Care Quality Commission issued a warning to NHS trusts in August 2022 about risks to mental health patients being transported by non-emergency providers after inspections raised issues about the use of restraints, sexual safety, physical health needs, vehicle and equipment safety standards, and unsafe recruitment practices.

== See also ==
- Casualty movement
- Ambulance
