= SAM splint =

Medical device

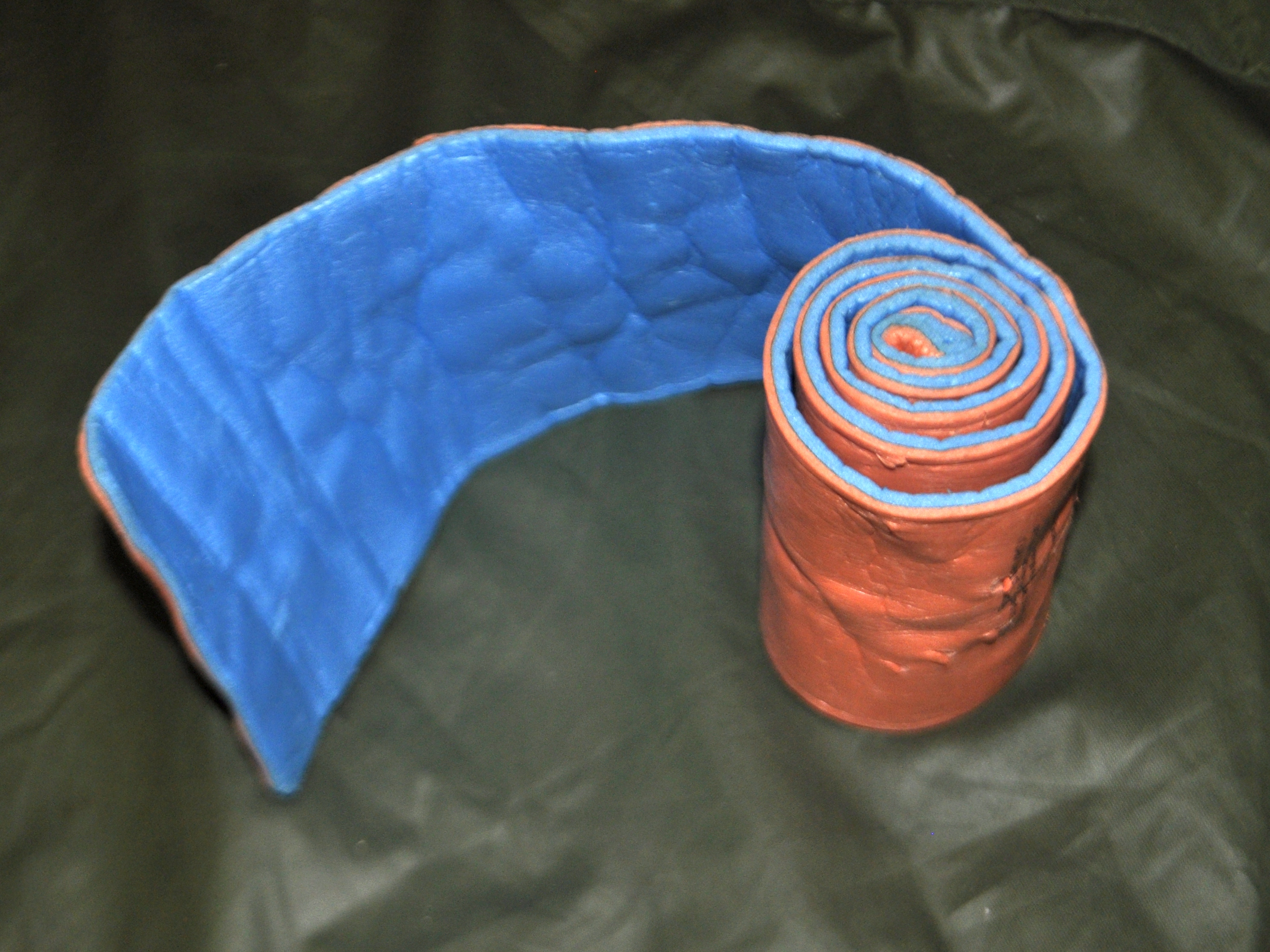
- Synonyms: Structural aluminum malleable splint
- Specialty: Emergency medicine
- Intervention: bone immobilization
- Inventor(s): Dr. Sam Scheinberg
- Invention date: 1985
- Manufacturer: Sam medical products, Rhino Rescue and FLARESYN
- [edit on Wikidata]

The SAM (structural aluminum malleable) splint is a compact, lightweight, highly versatile device designed for immobilizing bone and soft tissue injuries in emergency settings. It consists of a layer of .016 inches (0.41 mm) strips of soft aluminum, with a polyethylene closed-cell foam coating. Now they are also sold in 18-inch and 9-inch packs, as well as packs for fingers.

The SAM splint was invented by Dr. Sam Scheinberg who, as a trauma surgeon during the Vietnam War, found that field medics generally ignored the splint they were issued by the Army. He developed the idea while playing with a foil chewing gum wrapper.

The device is often found in first aid kits, emergency medical technician "jump kits," ambulances, and other similar settings. Generally supplied in a roll or as a flat strip up to 910 millimetres (36 in) long and 108 millimetres (4.25 in) wide, it can be unrolled or unfolded and formed to the shape of the injured person's body. Once folded into a curve, it becomes quite rigid and capable of immobilizing injured limbs and bones, including the leg, forearm, and humerus. Folded properly, it can also be used to stabilize the cervical spine. It can be easily cut with any scissors or shears, to make smaller devices such as finger splints.

The SAM splint is radiolucent, meaning it does not interfere with X-rays.

After use, the SAM splint can be cleaned, rerolled, and reused.

== See also ==
- Splint
