= Stretcher =

Equipment for moving patients in need of medical care

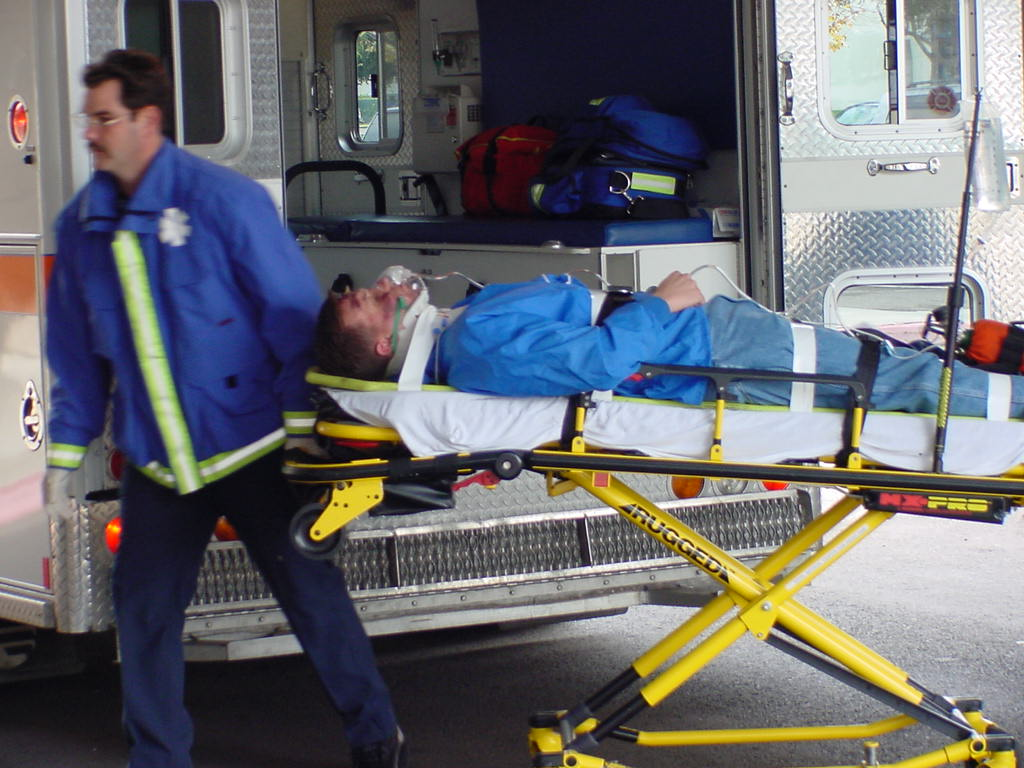
EMTs using a stretcher in 2001.

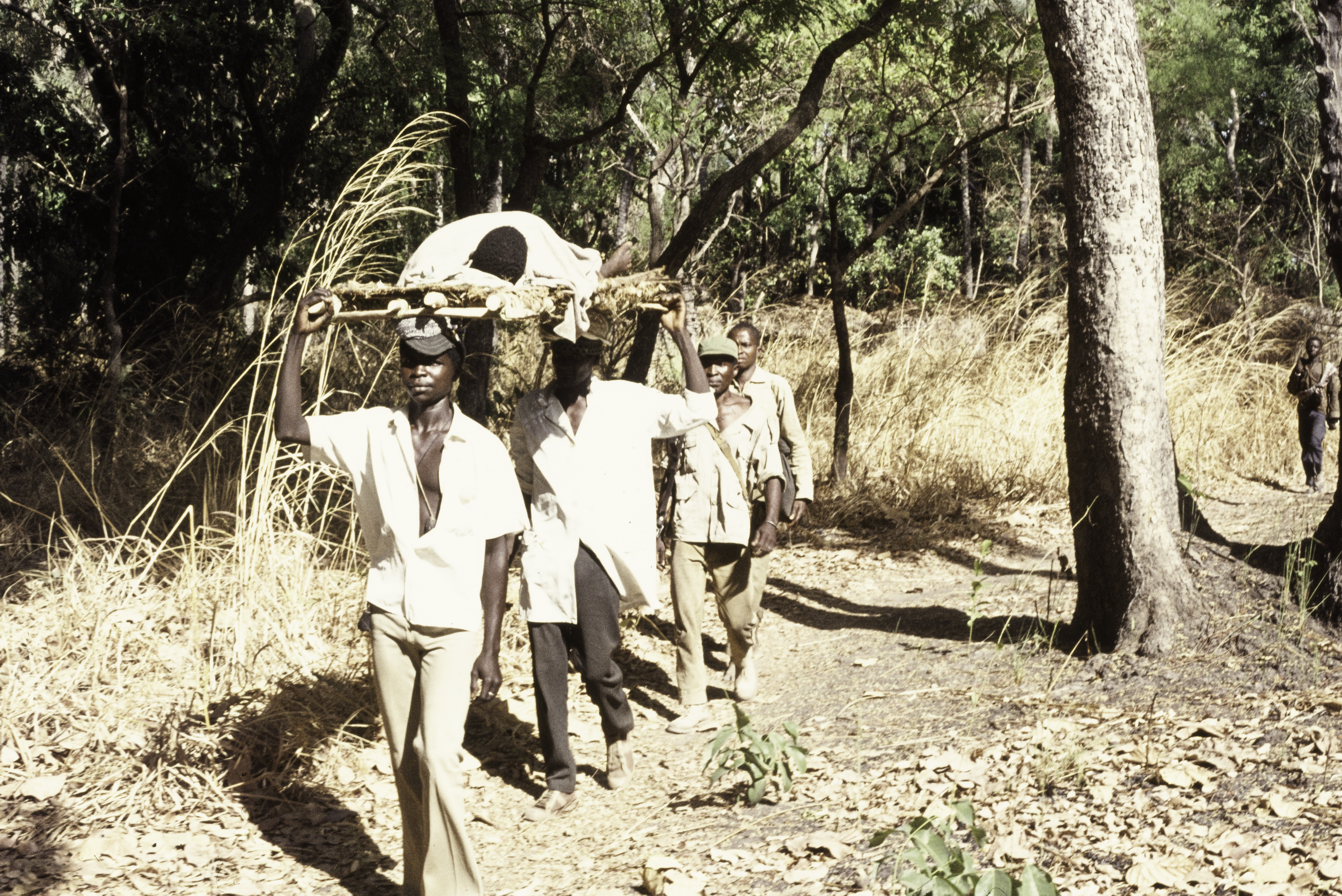
Armed escort carries the wounded to the Senegalese border, Guinea-Bissau, 1974.

A stretcher, gurney, litter, or pram is an apparatus used for moving patients who require medical care. A basic type (cot or litter) must be carried by two or more people. A wheeled stretcher (known as a gurney, trolley, bed, or cart) is often equipped with variable height frames, wheels, tracks, or skids.

Stretchers are primarily used in acute out-of-hospital care situations by emergency medical services (EMS), military, and search and rescue personnel. In medical forensics, the right arm of a corpse is left hanging off the stretcher to let paramedics know it is a deceased person. They are also used to restrain prisoners during executions via lethal injection.

== History ==
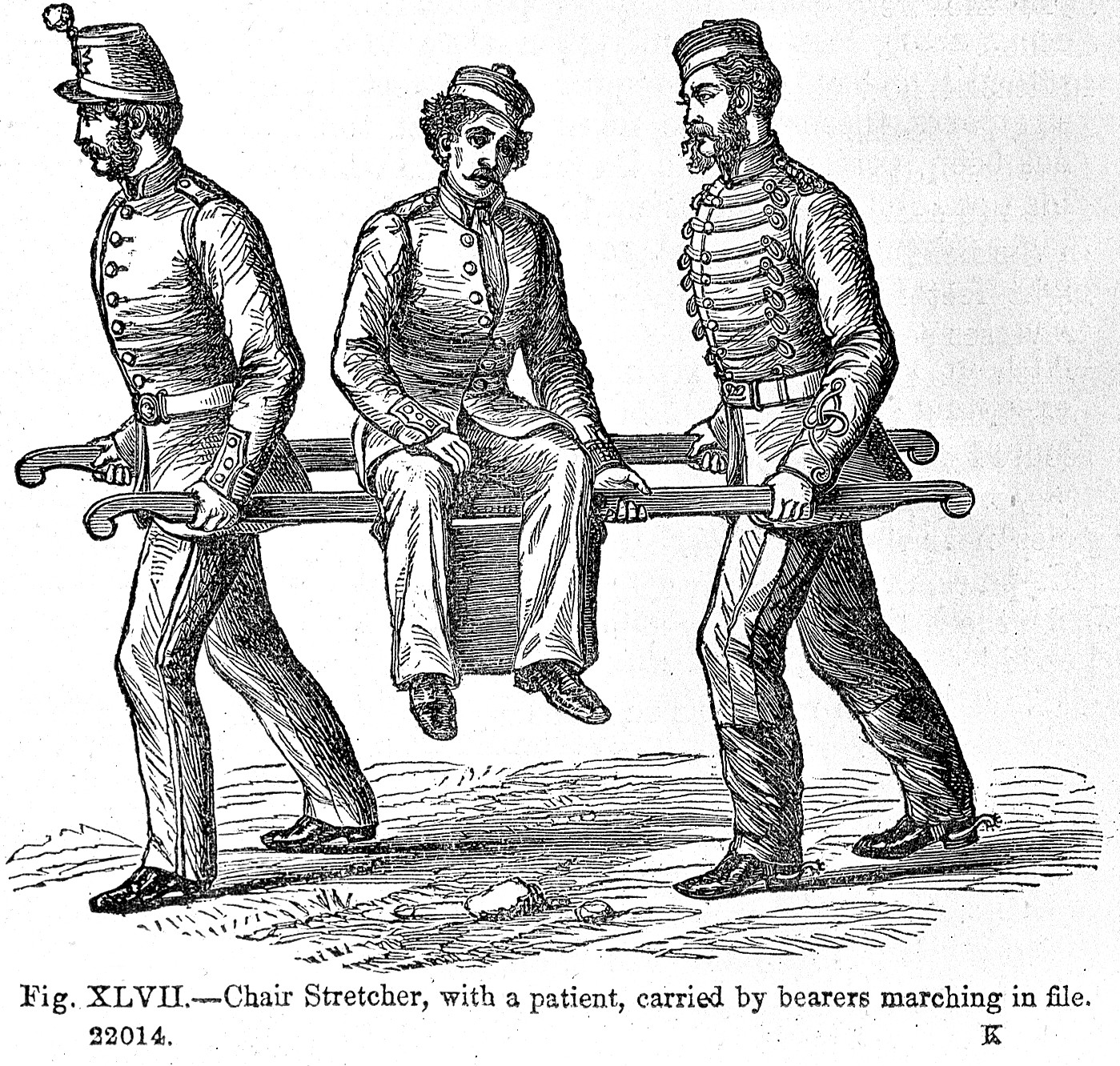
Illustration of chair stretcher, "On the Transport of sick and wounded troops", 1868.

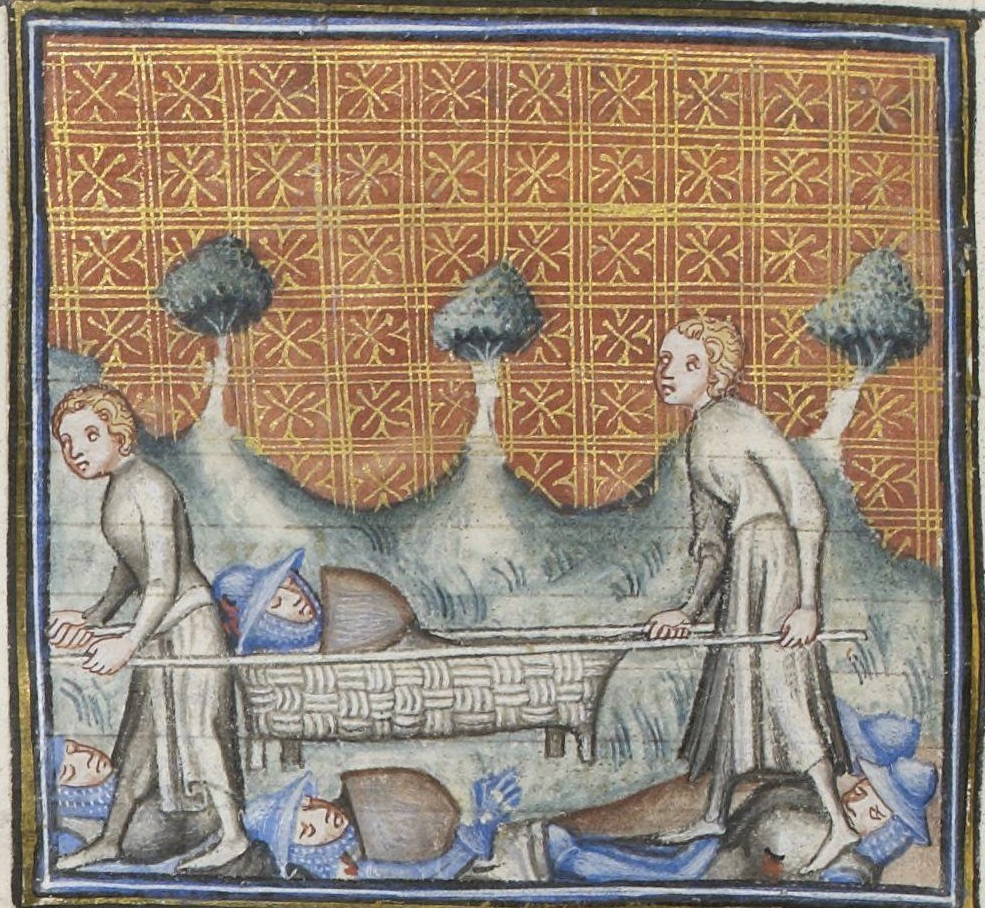
A wounded knight is carried on a medieval stretcher.

An early stretcher, likely made of wicker over a frame, appears in a manuscript from c. 1380. Simple stretchers were common with militaries through the middle of the 20th century.

== Gurney ==
Generally spelled gurney, but also guerney or girney. The first usage of the term for a wheeled stretcher is unclear, but it is believed to have been derived from Pacific Coast slang. Its use in a hospital context was established by the 1930s.

== Classification ==
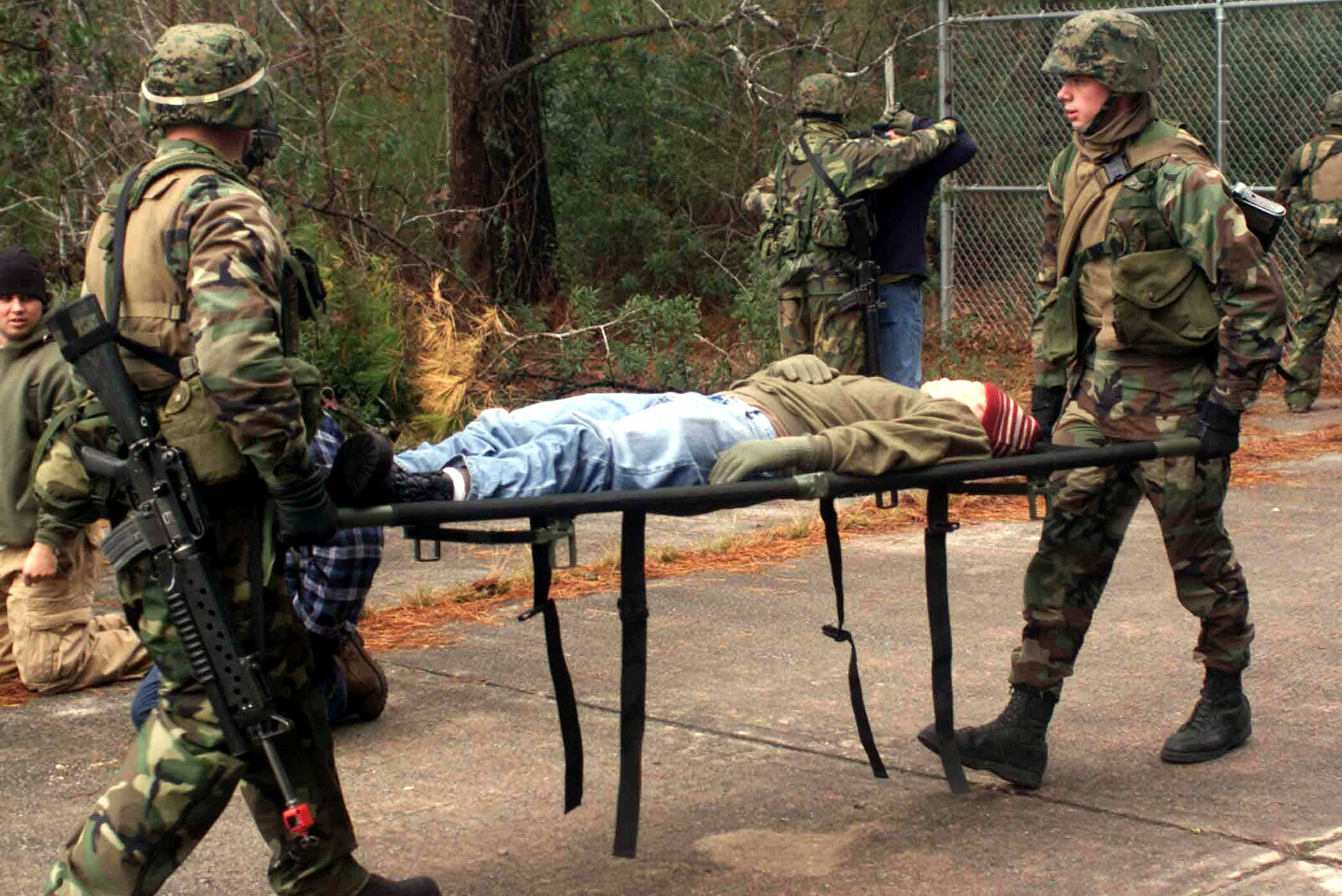
A simple stretcher used by U.S. Marines in a training environment in December 2003.

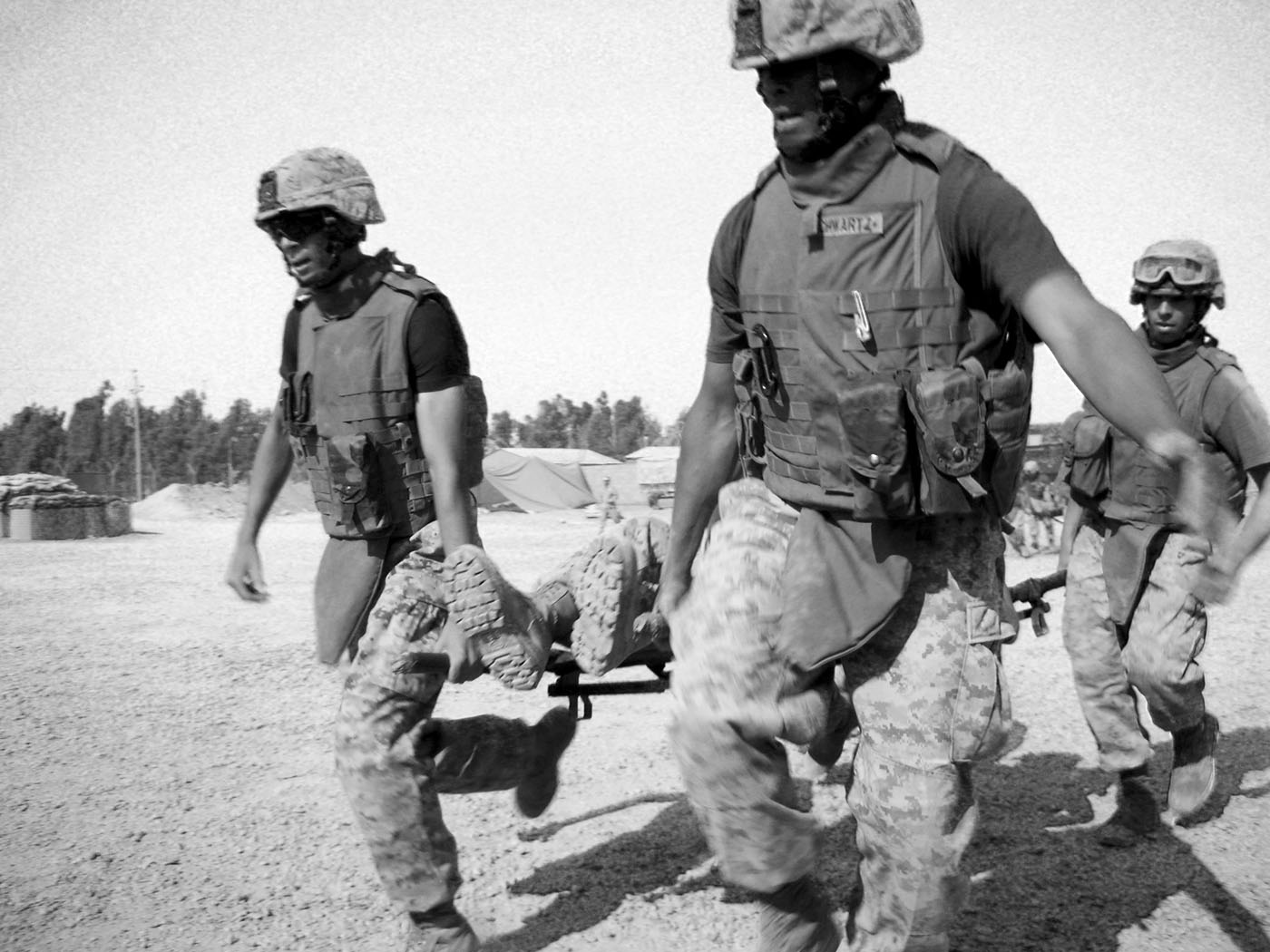
U.S. Marines transport a non-ambulatory patient, outside of Fallujah, Iraq in 2006

EMS stretchers used in ambulances have wheels that makes transportation over pavement easier, and have a lock inside the ambulance and straps to secure the patient during transport. An integral lug on the stretcher locks into a sprung latch within the ambulance in order to prevent movement during transport. Modern stretchers may also have battery-powered hydraulics to raise and collapse the legs automatically. This eases the workload on EMS personnel, who are statistically at high risk of back injury from repetitive raising and lowering of patients. Specialized bariatric stretchers are also available, which feature a wider frame and higher weight capacity for heavier patients. Stretchers are usually covered with a disposable sheet or wrapping, and are cleaned after each use to prevent the spread of infection. Shelves, hooks and poles for medical equipment and intravenous medication are also frequently included.

Standard stretchers have several adjustments. The bed can be raised or lowered to facilitate patient transfer. The head of the stretcher can be raised so that the patient is in a sitting position (especially important for those in respiratory distress) or lowered flat in order to perform CPR, or for patients with suspected spinal injury who must be transported on a spinal board. The feet can be raised to what is called the Trendelenburg position, indicated for patients in shock.

Some manufacturers have begun to offer hybrid devices that combine the functionality of a stretcher, a recliner chair, and a treatment or procedural table into one device.

=== Basic stretchers ===
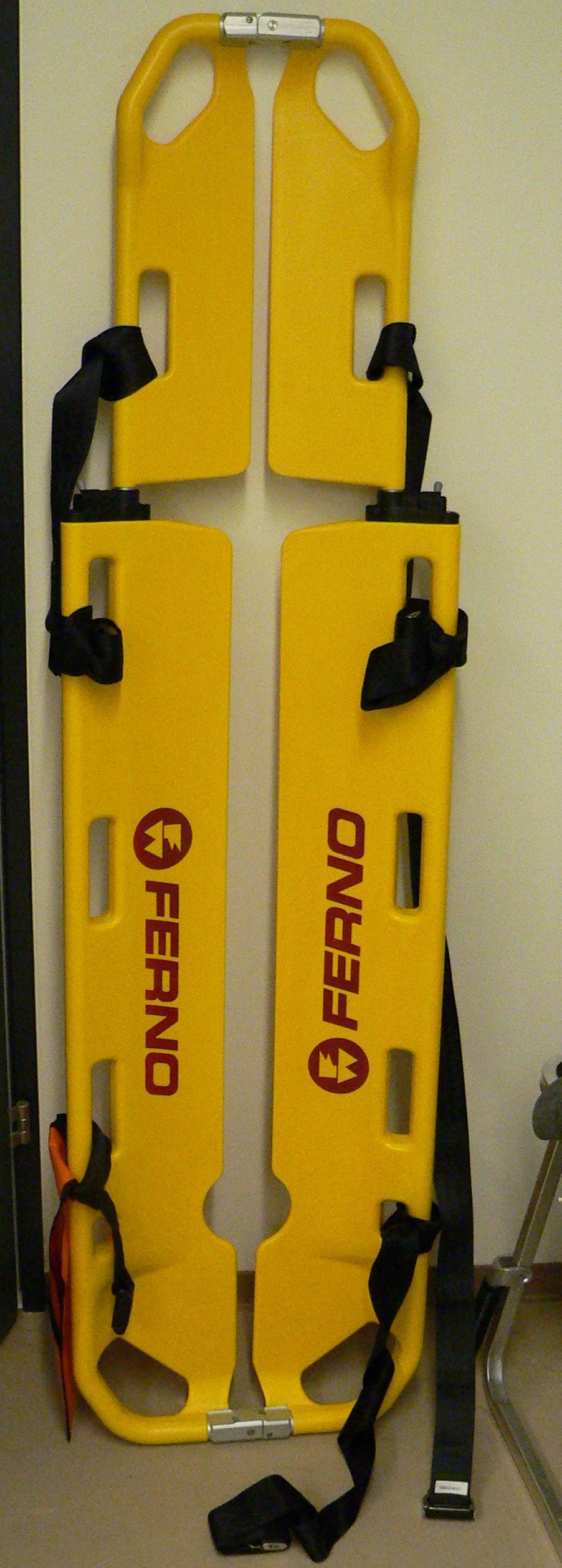
Scoop stretcher

- Simple stretchers are the most rudimentary type. They are lightweight and portable, made of canvas or other synthetic material suspended between two poles or tubular aluminum frame. Many are stored as disaster supplies and are often former military equipment.
- The folding stretcher, also known as a top deck or collapsible stretcher, is similar in design to the simple stretcher, but features one or more hinged points of articulation to allow the stretcher to be collapsed into a more compact form for easier handling or storage. Some models may even allow the patient to sit upright in a Fowler's or Semi-Fowler's position.
- The Roberson orthopedic stretcher or scoop stretcher is used for lifting patients, for instance from the ground onto an ambulance stretcher or onto a spinal board. The two ends of the stretcher can be detached from each other, splitting the stretcher into two longitudinal halves. To load a patient, one or both ends of the stretcher are detached, the halves placed under the patient from either side and fastened back together. With obese patients, the possibility exists of accidentally pinching the patient's back when closing the stretcher, so care must be made not to injure them when carrying out this procedure.
- The litter, also known as a basket stretcher or Stokes litter, is designed to be used where there are obstacles to movement or other hazards: for example, in confined spaces, on slopes, in wooded terrain. Typically it is shaped to accommodate an adult in a face up position and it is used in search and rescue operations. The person is strapped into the basket, making safe evacuation possible. The litter has raised sides and often includes a removable head/torso cover for patient protection. After the person is secured in the litter, the litter may be wheeled, carried by hand, mounted on an ATV, towed behind skis, snowmobile, or horse, lifted or lowered on high angle ropes, or hoisted by helicopter.
- The WauK board is also designed for use in small spaces. The patient is secured to the board with straps. It has two wheels and a foldable footrest at one end, allowing the patient to be moved by one person, much as with a hand truck for moving cargo. It can also be used at a variety of angles, making it easier to traverse obstacles, such as tight stairwells.
- The Neil Robertson stretcher is a stretcher designed for securely transporting injured individuals through narrow and confined spaces, such as steep ladders, small hatchways, and narrow passages. The Neil Robertson stretcher is widely used in maritime settings, particularly by naval forces and maritime rescue team.

=== Flexible stretchers ===
A flexible stretcher, also known by the brand names Reeves sleeve or SKED, (Note: Not an acronym: rather, a portmanteau of skid and sled.) is a stretcher that is often supported longitudinally by wooden or plastic planks. Essentially a tarpaulin with handles, it is primarily used to move a patient through confined spaces, e.g., a narrow hallway, or to lift obese patients. Reeves stretchers have six handholds, allowing multiple rescuers to assist extrication.

=== Wheeled stretchers ===
A collapsible wheeled stretcher, or gurney, is a type of stretcher on a variable-height wheeled frame. Normally, an integral lug on the stretcher locks into a sprung latch within the ambulance in order to prevent movement during transport, often referred to as antlers due to their shape. It is usually covered with a disposable sheet and cleaned after each patient in order to prevent the spread of infection. Its key value is to facilitate moving the patient and sheet onto a fixed bed or table on arrival at the emergency department. Both types may have straps to secure the patient.

=== Other types of stretchers ===
The Nimier stretcher (brancard Nimier) was a type of stretcher used by the French army during World War I. The patient was placed on their back, but in a "seated position", (that is, the thighs were perpendicular to the abdomen). Thus, the stretcher was shorter and could turn in the trenches. This type of stretcher is rarely seen today.

== Major stretcher manufacturing companies ==
Company	Country	Description
Stryker Corporation	United States	One of the world's largest medical-technology companies; a major producer of hospital beds and stretchers.
Ferno-Washington Inc.	United States	Specializes in patient-handling equipment, including stretchers and rescue litters.
Hill-Rom Holdings, Inc. (subsidiary of Baxter)	United States	Manufacturer of hospital equipment including beds and stretchers; one of the most recognized brands in patient transport.
MeBer s.r.l.	Italy	Italian manufacturer of medical emergency stretchers and rescue equipment.
Narang Medical Ltd.	India	Indian company with a global export network; producer of hospital furniture and various stretcher models.
ROYAX s.r.o.	Czech Republic	Manufacturer of rescue and military stretchers with international quality certifications.

== See also ==
- Battlefield medicine
- Camp bed
- Casualty movement
- Hospital bed
- Litter (rescue basket)
- Spinal board
- Trolley (disambiguation)
