= HTG-UK =

English private ambulance service

HTG-UK, founded as Thames Ambulance Service in 1986, is a non-emergency private ambulance service with headquarters in Lincoln, and bases across England.

== History ==
It had a sub-contract for patient transport services in Sussex with Coperforma. In November 2016, it proposed to make the staff redundant, claiming it had not been paid since June 2016.

The Care Quality Commission inspected it in 2017 and ordered it to improve after it found issues with found cleanliness, infection control and hygiene.

It took over patient transport services in North East Lincolnshire in October 2016. Six extra ambulance crews were brought in to temporarily support the local operation.

It started a contract for patient transport services in Hull in April 2017. Staff who were transferred from Yorkshire Ambulance Service were told that they would not be paid overtime and expenses in the first month because of “cash flow problems”. After the clinical commissioning group intervened they were paid. The local branch of the health union UNISON said that workers remained concerned about the problems with payment.

It won a five-year contract worth £28 million in Leicestershire and Rutland from October 2017, taking over from Arriva.
