= Litter (rescue basket) =

Basket-like stretcher device used to carry injured people

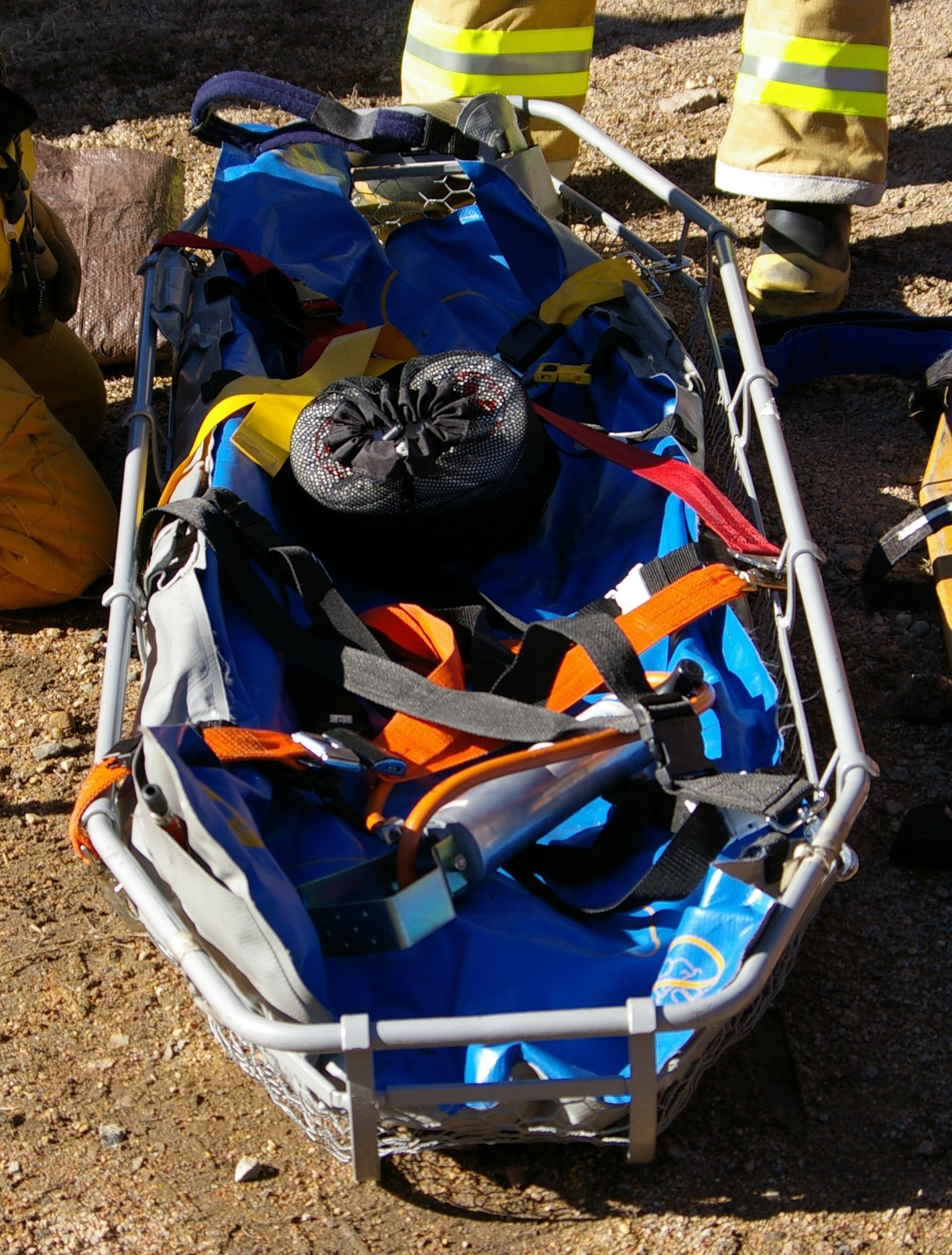
A Stokes basket as used by a fire department, with a vacuum bag to restrain the person in the litter

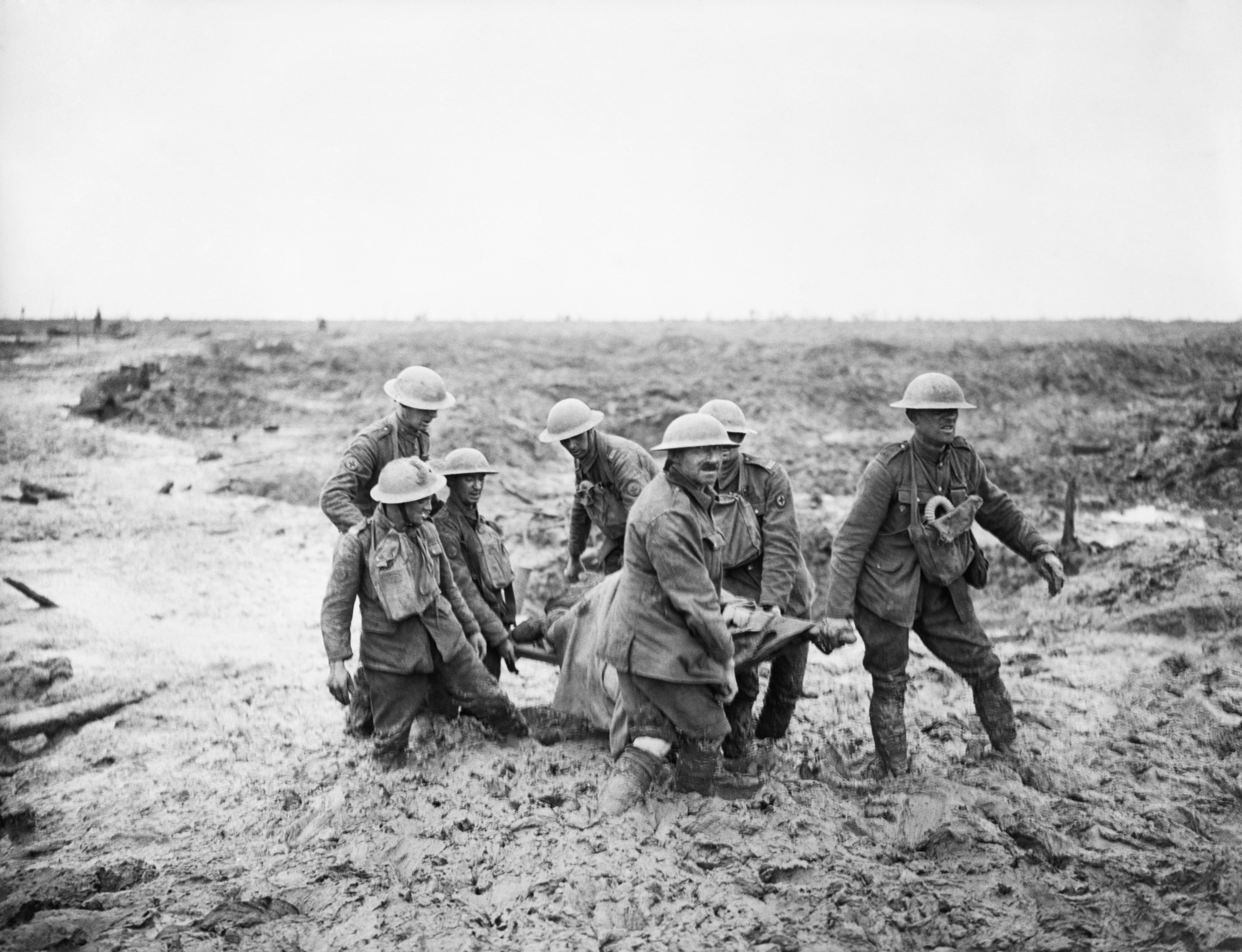
World War I stretcher in use

A litter is a stretcher designed to be used where there are physical obstacles that impair movement, including other hazards such as, in confined spaces, on slopes or uneven terrain, or in densely forested areas. Typically it is shaped to accommodate an adult in a face up position and it is used in search and rescue operations. The person is strapped into the basket, making safe evacuation possible. The person generally is further protected by a cervical collar and sometimes a long spine board, so as to immobilize the person and prevent further injury.

A litter essentially is a stretcher with sides (or just a raised edge) and a removable head and/or torso cover. They are most notably remembered from Korea and Vietnam images of United States Air Force Pararescue airmen or more recent Coast Guard video clips of helicopters rescuing injured people from isolated areas. Some will also recall the images from the TV shows Emergency! and M*A*S*H of fixed stretchers on either side of medical evacuation helicopters.

One widely used style of litter is the Stokes basket.

== Uses ==
After the person is secured in the litter, the litter may be wheeled, carried by hand, mounted on an ATV, towed behind skis, snowmobile, or horse, lifted or lowered on high angle ropes, or hoisted by helicopter.

Litters are used to rescue victims in confined spaces, such as inside a ship or a cave network. Litters used in surface water rescue are equipped with floats. Litters used in mountain rescue usually are equipped with a cover or other material to protect the person from falling rocks. Litters used in search and rescue often can be disassembled for easier carrying. Some litters can be mounted on a wheel.

== Stokes basket ==
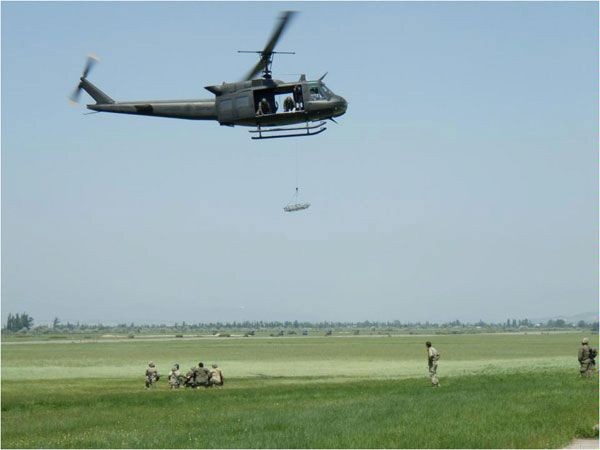
A litter basket at the United States–Georgian drills in 2011

A Stokes basket, also called a Stokes stretcher or Stokes litter, is a metal wire or plastic litter widely used in search and rescue.

Originally designed by Charles F. Stokes, these baskets have been notorious for spinning under the downdraft from the rotating helicopter blades. Design improvements have included using multiple attachment points, separate hold-down cables, and powered extension hoists to help save more lives. Recently the U.S. Navy has used the Stokes basket to transport patients through narrow corridors and doorways.

== History ==
During the United States Civil War, horse-mounted litters were used to transport wounded soldiers from battlefields. Rear Admiral Charles Francis Stokes, retired Surgeon General of the Navy from 1910 to 1924, devised the Stokes stretcher.

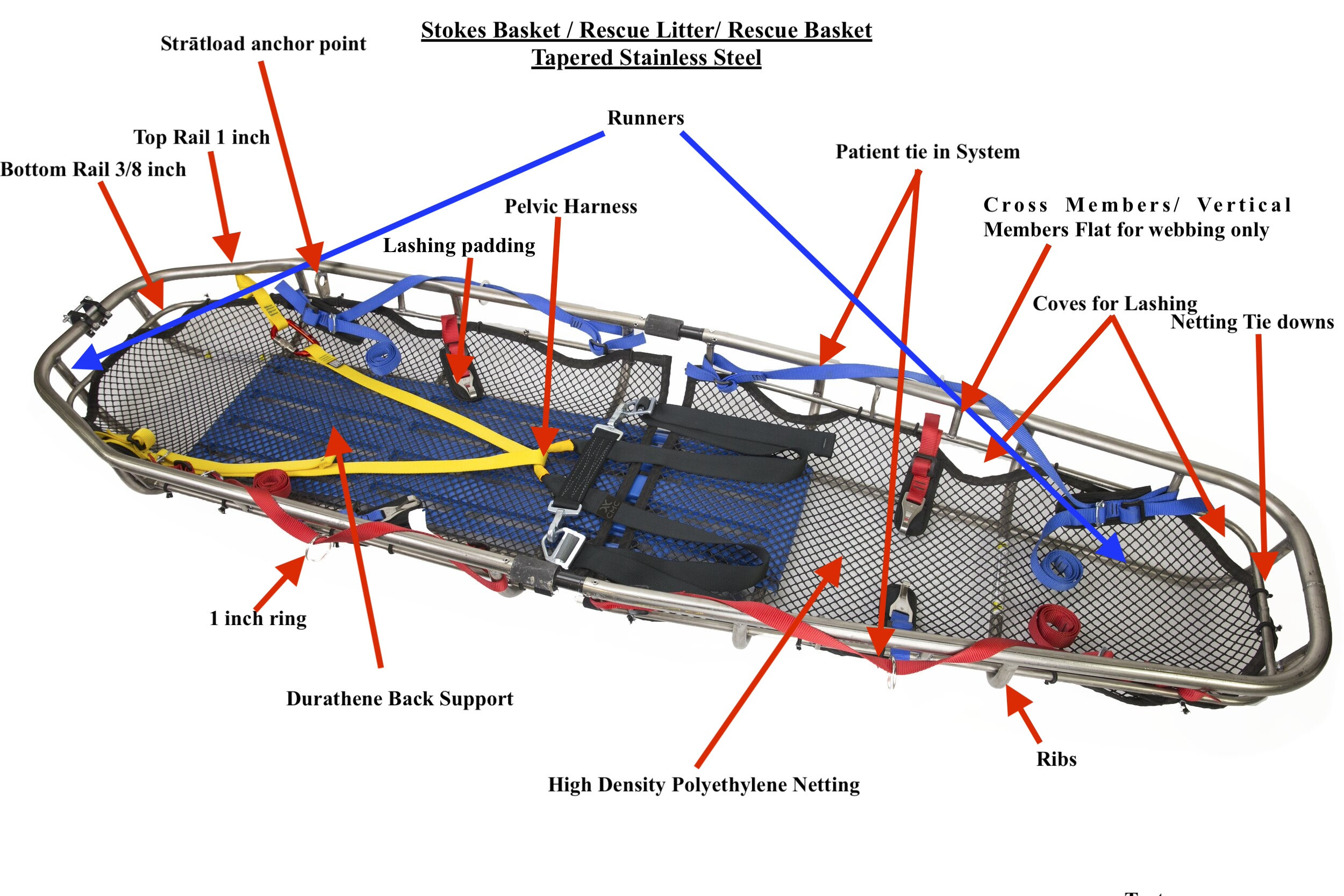

== Gallery ==
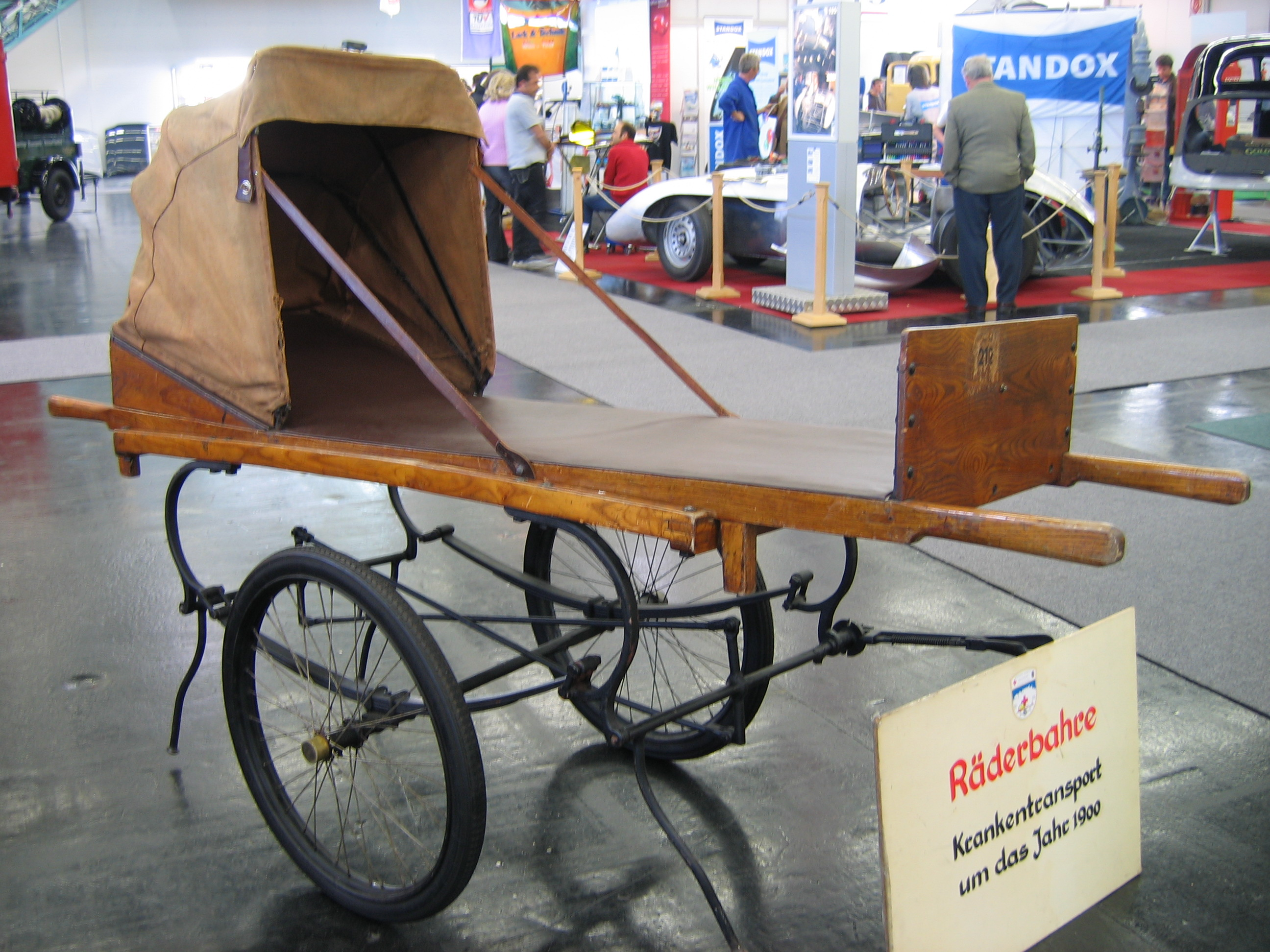
Litter on wheels, made c. 1900

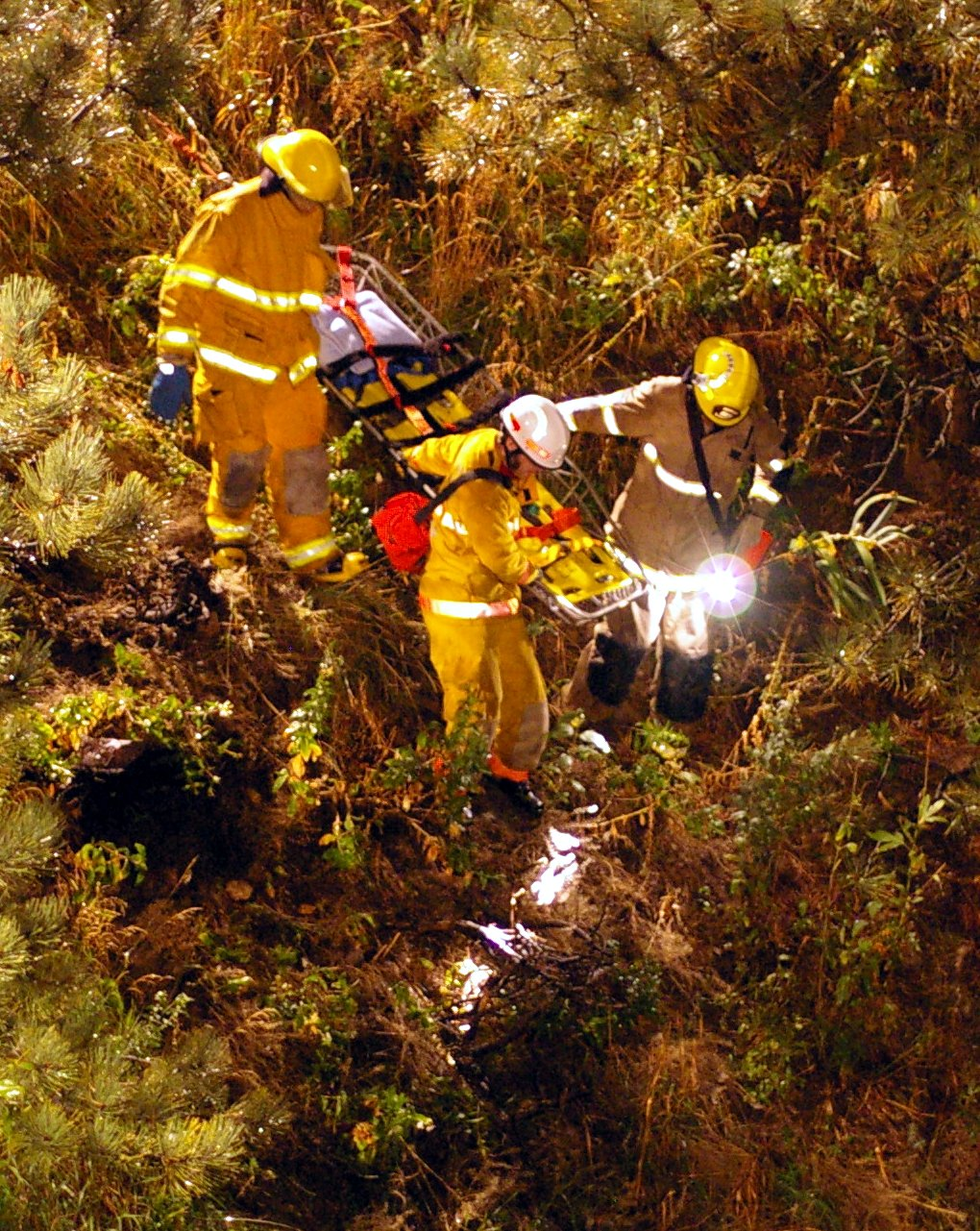
Firefighters lowering a Stokes basket down a hill

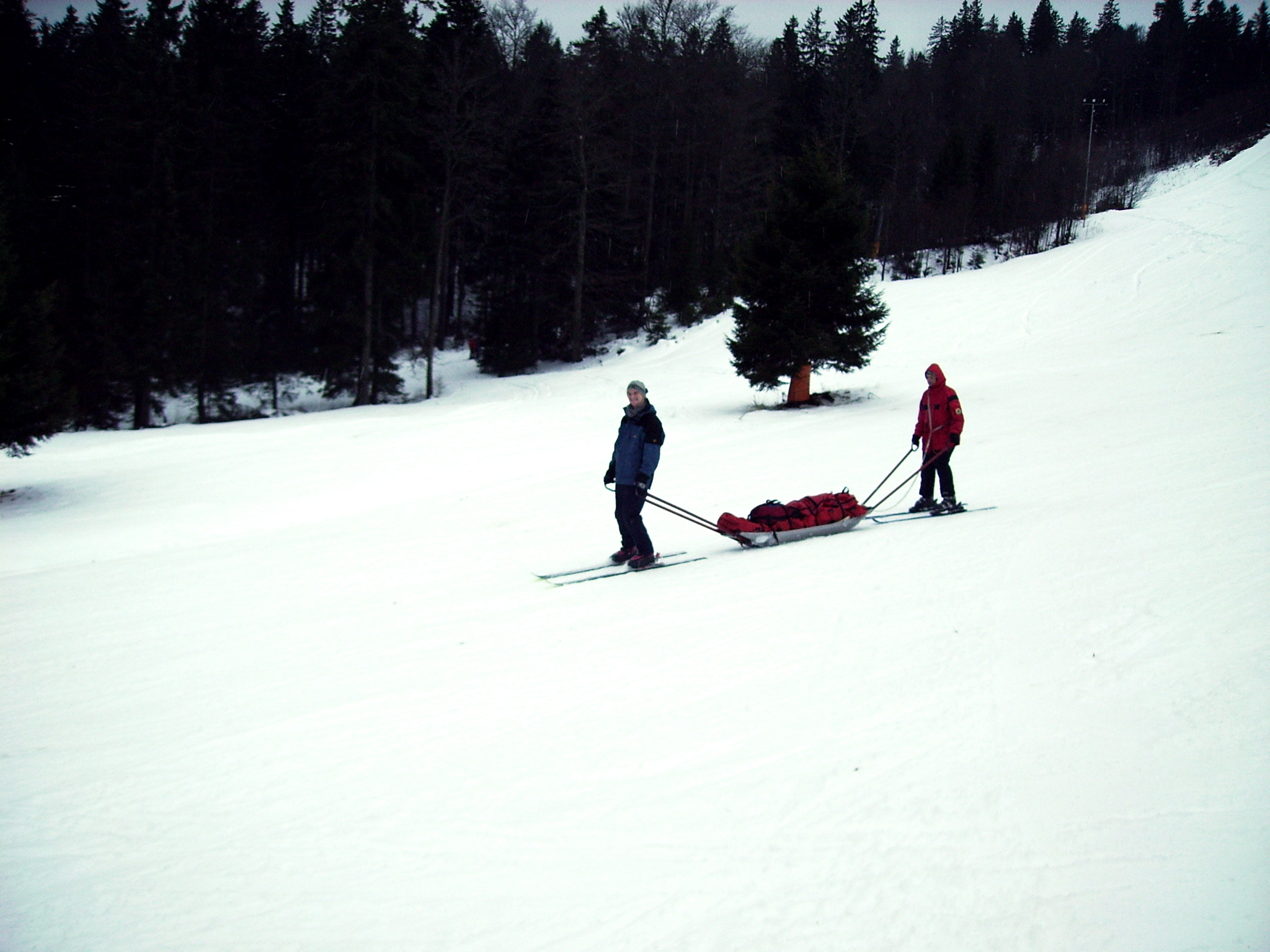
Patient transport sled managed by skiers

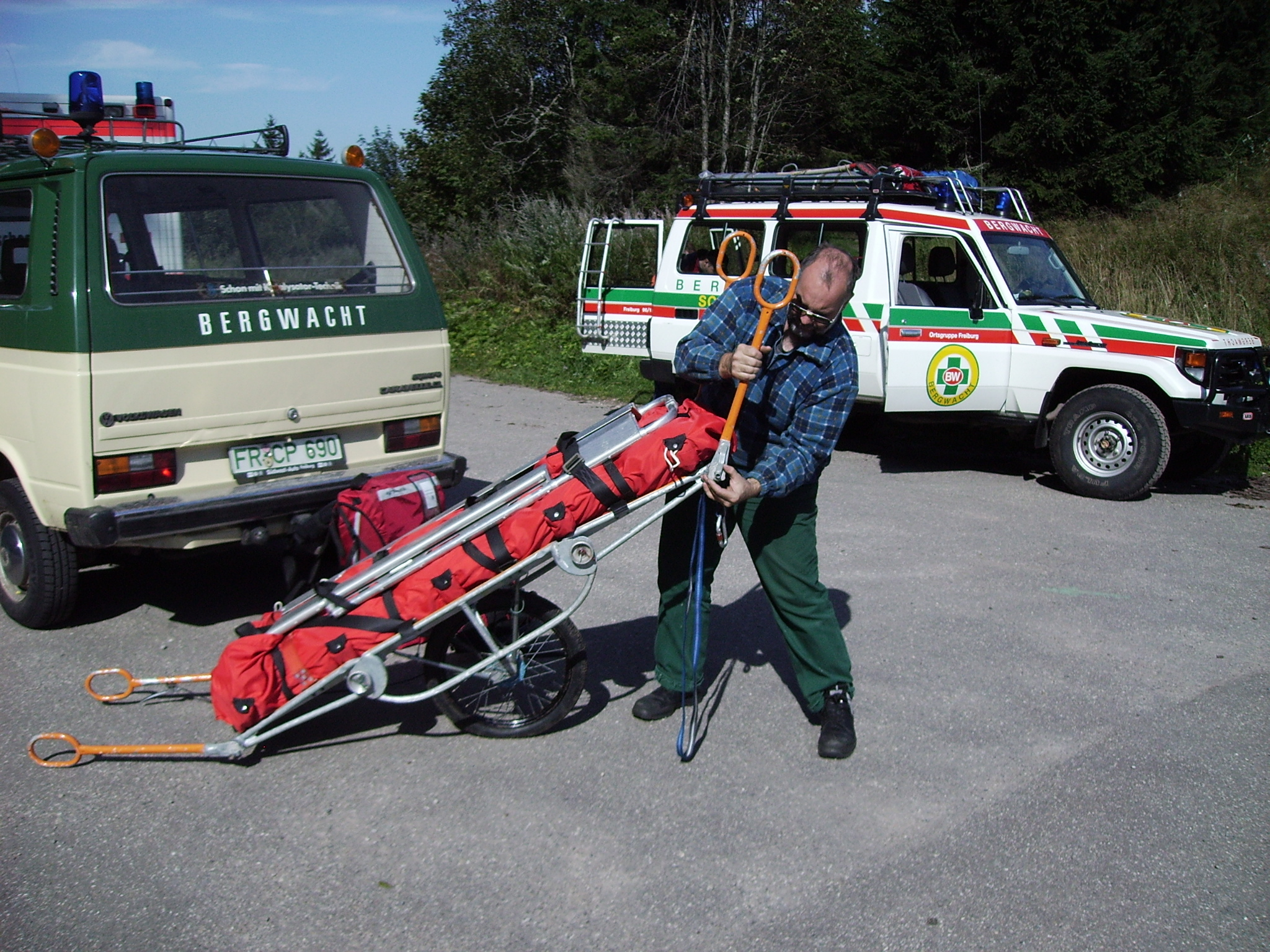
A mountain rescue litter

== See also ==
- Battlefield medicine
