= Kendrick extrication device =

Extrication brace for motor vehicle accidents

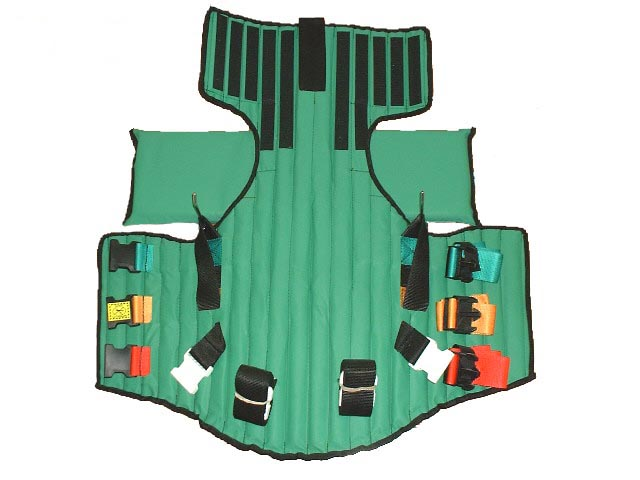
Diagram of a Kendrick extrication device

A Kendrick extrication device (KED) is a device used in extrication of victims of traffic collisions from motor vehicles. Commonly carried on ambulances, a KED is typically used by an emergency medical technician, paramedic, or another first responder. It was originally designed for extrication of race car drivers. Typically used in conjunction with a cervical collar, a KED is a semi-rigid brace that secures the head, neck and torso in an anatomically neutral position. Its use is claimed to reduce the possibility of additional injuries to these regions during extrication, although its value has been questioned, as there is a lack of evidence to support its use. The original KED was designed by Richard Kendrick in 1978.

== Description ==
Typically there are two head straps, three torso straps, and two legs straps which are used to adequately secure the KED to the victim. Unlike a long spine board or litter, the KED uses a series of wooden or polymer bars in a nylon jacket, allowing the responders to immobilize the neck and upper spine and remove the victim from the vehicle or other confined space. Although a KED can also be used to immobilize infants and children, it is preferable to use specifically designed pediatric immobilization devices whenever possible. If a KED is used to immobilize an infant or child, appropriate padding must be used to ensure complete immobilization in a manner that does not obscure the thorax and abdomen, thereby preventing continued assessment of these vital areas.

== Application ==
The device can be quickly and easily inserted into the seat of a vehicle by a single rescuer, allows access to the airway and conforms to any body size. A KED is typically used only on hemodynamically stable victims; unstable victims are extricated using rapid extrication techniques without the prior application of the KED.

Once the KED is slid into position, it is secured to the victim with straps in order to prevent movement. The first strap that is secured is the middle torso strap. According to the KED users' manual securing this strap secures the greatest area of the device and therefore provides the greatest stability while securing the rest of the device. Next the bottom torso strap is secured, however the top torso strap is not secured until just prior to moving the patient to the long spine board. This is to allow the patient to breathe easily while the rest of the device is secured. Following the bottom torso strap the leg straps are secured. These may be applied in a "criss-cross" fashion (according to the KED users' manual this is the most commonly used method), or applied by securing them to their respective sides. If there is any evidence of a groin injury the "criss-cross" method cannot be used. Following application of the leg straps the void between the head and device is padded as needed and the head is secured. Finally, just prior to moving the patient to a long spine board the top strap is secured. Some schools teach this order by remembering phrases such as "My Baby Looks Hot Tonight", where the beginning of each word stands for Middle torso strap, Bottom torso strap, Leg straps, Head strap and Top torso strap.

The head pad can bring the head too far forward for the side panels to fully immobilize it. Care must be taken to secure the head properly to maintain neutral immobilization. If the head is too far forward, the head is brought back to meet the KED unless crepitus, pain or resistance is met. If these symptoms are present, the head is immobilized in the position found.

There has been debate surrounding the exact order of applying the torso straps, with some saying that the order does not matter as long as the torso is secured before the head. The KED users' manual is sometimes used in these debates: it states the reason the top strap is last is a function of breathing and not the process of immobilization itself.

== Value ==
There is controversy about whether the use of a KED is actually appropriate in prehospital care. A 2015 article in the Journal of Paramedic Practice said that although the device has been used since the 1970s, its "overall appropriateness in patient care should be viewed with caution" and there is a "lack of evidence to support its use". A 1988 article in the Canadian Medical Association Journal said the device had "yet to be evaluated for its immobilization of the cervical spine" and that "the role and performance of the device in transferring patients by road or air ... must be addressed".

== Rapid extrication without a KED ==
During rapid extrication, the patient is not immobilized by a KED, but rather taken directly out of the car onto a back board. Reasons for using this technique include:

- The scene is unsafe
- The patient's condition is unstable
- The patient is blocking access to another victim.
