= Orthopedic cast =

Medical aid for the treatment of bone fractures

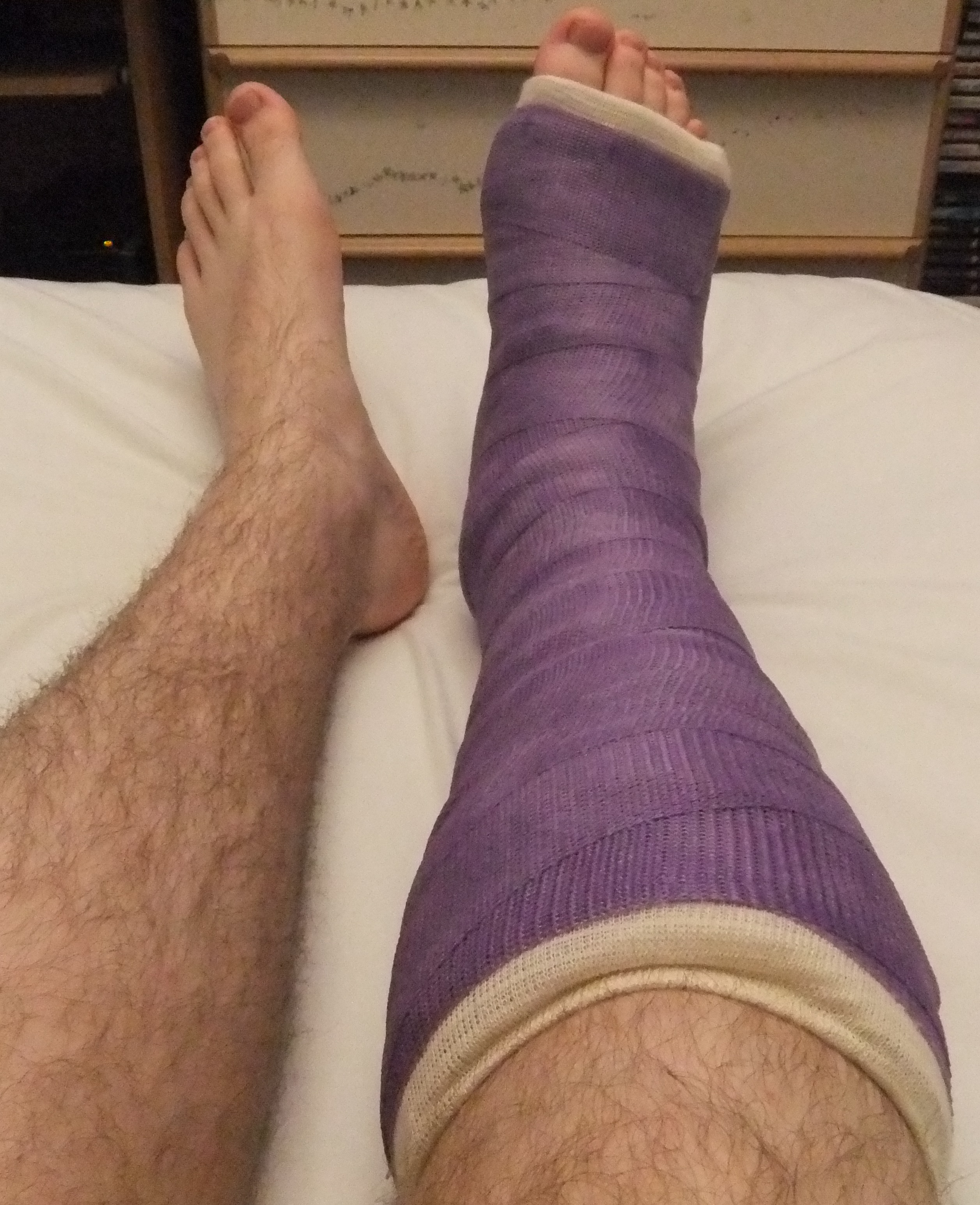
- A short leg cast with a fiberglass top layer being used to treat a fractured foot
- Other names: Body casts, plaster cast, surgical cast

An orthopedic cast or orthopaedic cast, commonly referred to simply as a cast, is a form of medical treatment used to immobilize and support bones and soft tissues during the healing process after fractures, surgeries, or severe injuries. By restricting movement, casts provide stability to the affected area, enabling proper alignment and healing of bones, ligaments, and tendons. They are commonly applied to the limbs but can also be used for the trunk, neck, or other parts of the body in specific cases. Orthopedic casts come in various types and designs, tailored to the nature and severity of the injury, as well as the patient's needs. Advances in medical techniques have made casts more comfortable, effective, and versatile, allowing for both weight-bearing and non-weight-bearing options.

== Upper extremity casts ==
Upper extremity casts are frequently utilized to immobilize the arm, wrist, or hand for the treatment of fractures, soft tissue injuries, or during post-surgical recovery. They offer stabilization and support, aiding in proper healing while minimizing the risk of further injury. Common types include long arm casts, short arm casts, and specialized versions such as thumb spica casts.

=== Long arm casts ===
A long arm cast extends from the upper arm to the wrist or hand, immobilizing the elbow joint in addition to the forearm. It is typically used for injuries requiring stabilization across multiple joints, such as forearm fractures, certain elbow injuries, and complex soft-tissue damage. It is usually ensured that the elbow remains immobilized in a slightly flexed position, usually around 90 degrees, to promote healing while maintaining comfort. Patients with long arm casts often require close monitoring for swelling and circulation issues, given the cast’s extensive coverage.

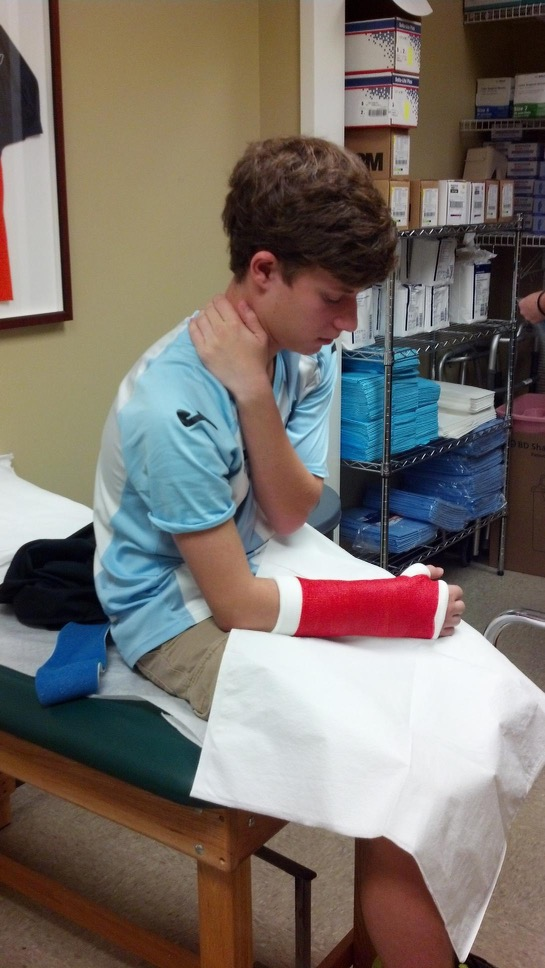
Short arm thumb spica cast on a teenager

=== Short arm casts ===
A short arm cast is designed to immobilize the wrist and part of the forearm, extending from below the elbow to the hand, often leaving the fingers free for limited mobility. It is used to treat less severe injuries, such as wrist fractures, sprains, or carpal bone issues. The cast restricts wrist movement while allowing elbow mobility, providing a balance between immobilization and functionality. In some cases, a thumb spica variant is added to include the thumb in immobilization, such as for scaphoid fractures or severe thumb sprains. Proper fit and careful alignment are critical to ensure effective healing and prevent complications.

== Lower extremity ==
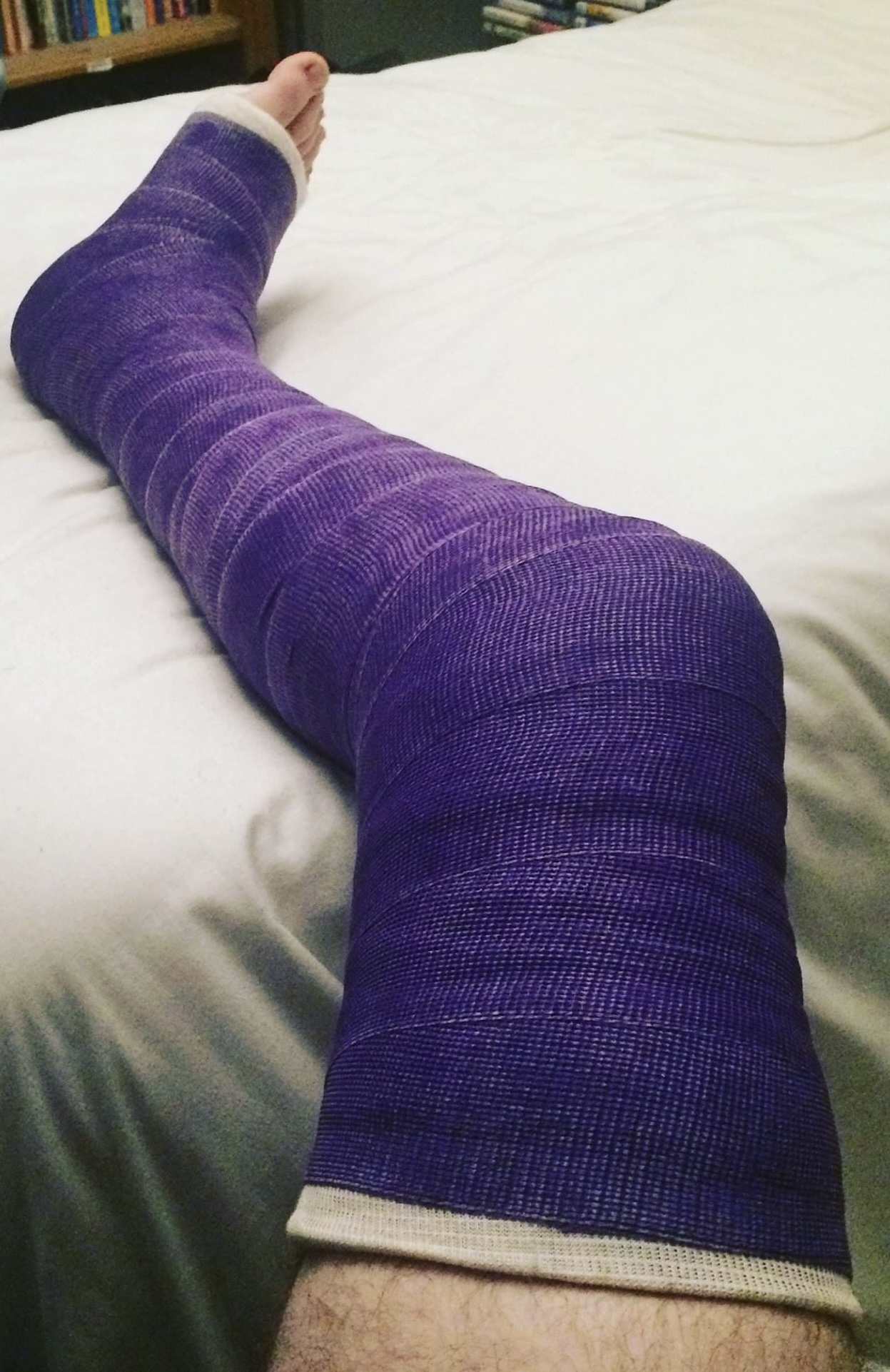
Fiberglass long leg cast immobilizing the leg for a tibial fracture

Leg casts are designed to immobilize the lower limb, facilitating the healing process for fractures, ligament injuries, or post-surgical repairs. They provide stability to the affected area, helping to alleviate pain and prevent additional damage. The design of leg casts can vary to cater to specific injuries, from simple foot fractures to more complicated multi-joint issues. The most common types of lower extremity casts include long leg casts and short leg casts. Different varieties exist between the two main types.

=== Long leg casts ===
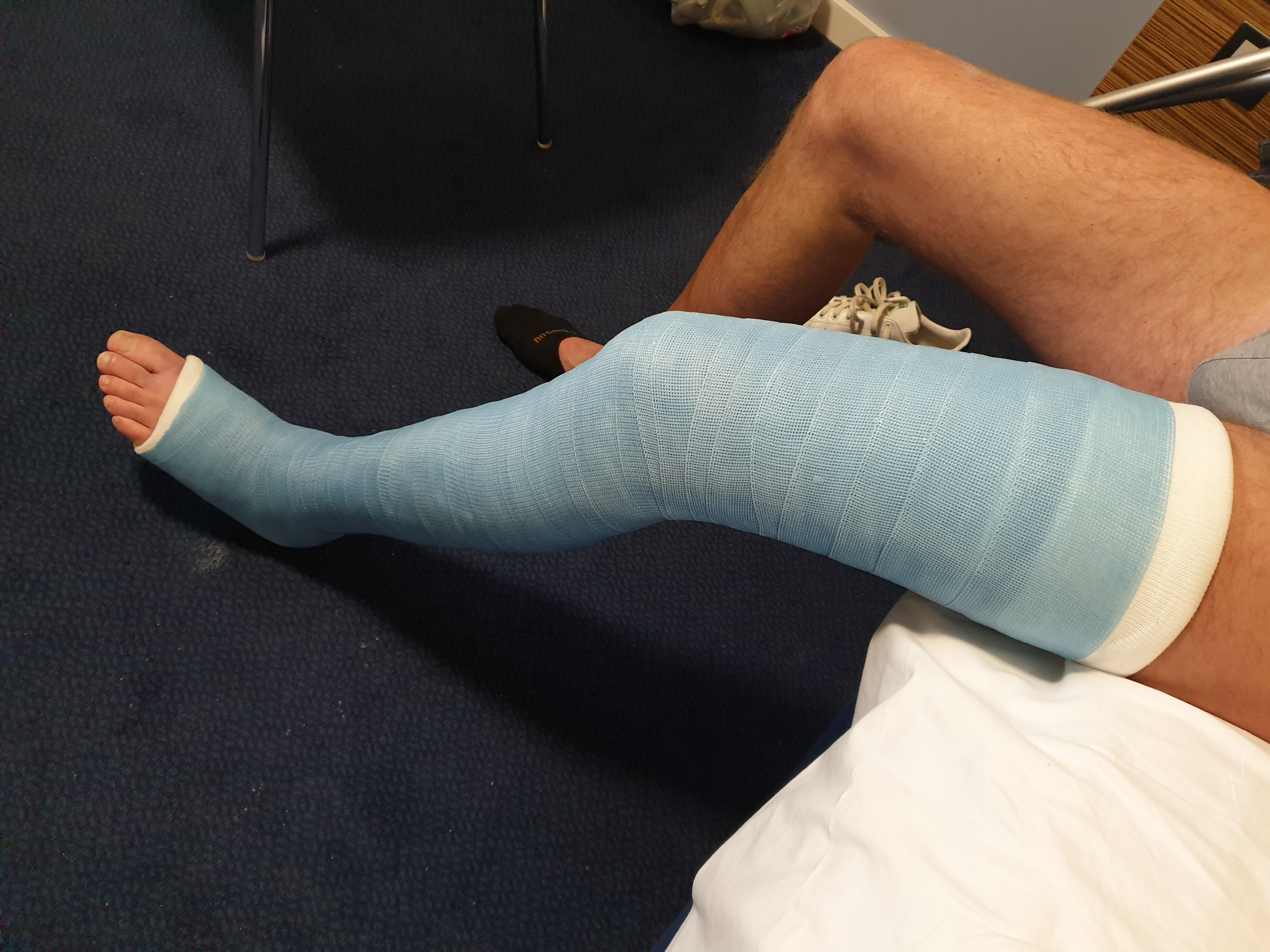
Long leg cast for tibial fracture

A long leg cast extends from the upper thigh to the toes, immobilizing the knee joint as well as the lower leg and ankle. It is typically used for injuries requiring stabilization across multiple joints, such as tibial or fibular fractures, severe knee injuries, or post-surgical recovery. It is ensured that the knee remains immobilized in a slightly flexed position, typically around 20-35 degrees, to promote healing while maintaining comfort. Patients with long leg casts often require close monitoring for swelling, circulation issues, and mobility challenges due to the cast’s extensive coverage.

=== Short leg casts ===
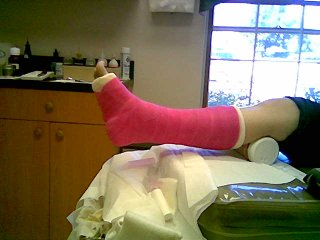
Newly applied short leg cast

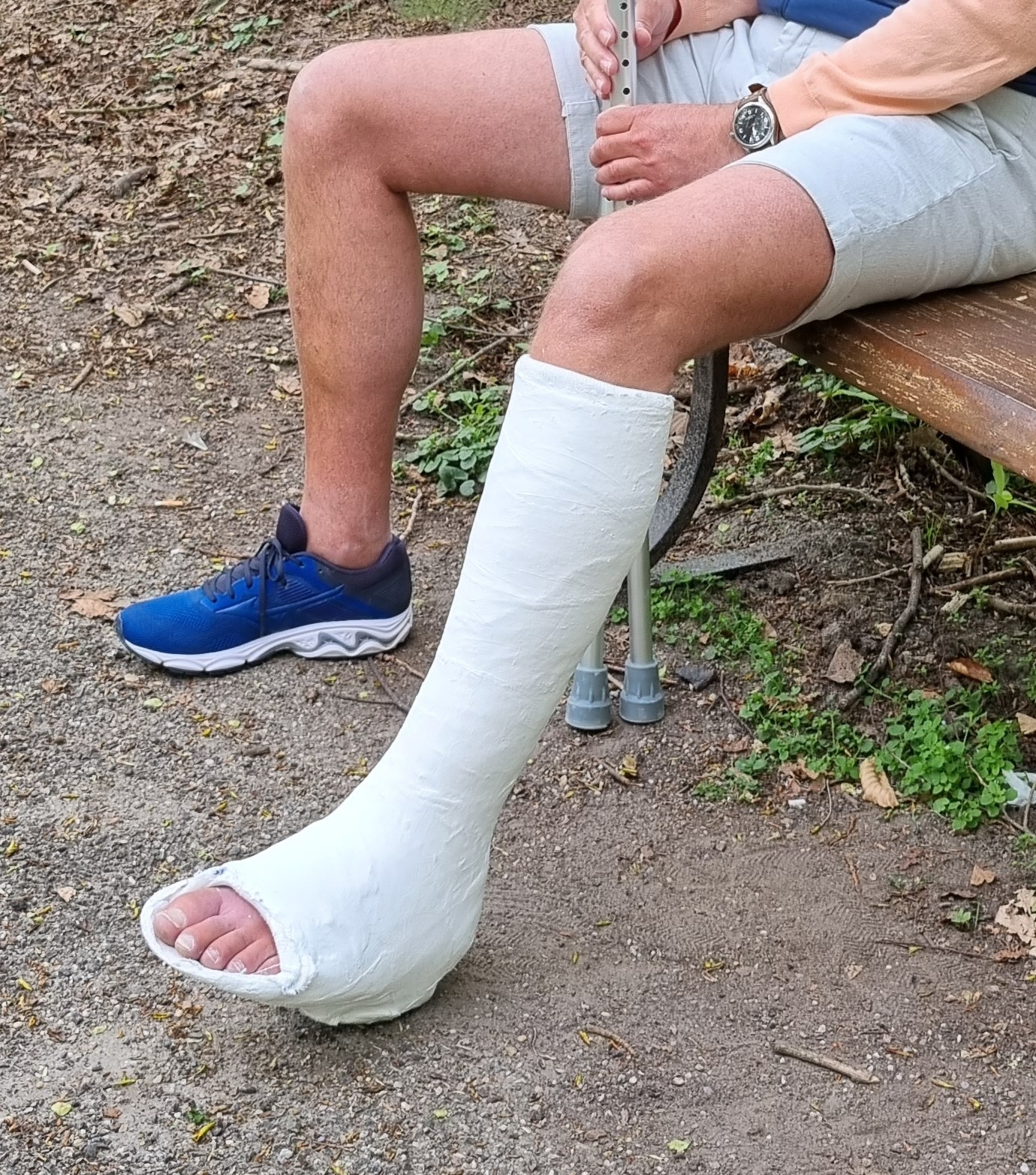
Plaster of Paris short leg walking cast with toeplate

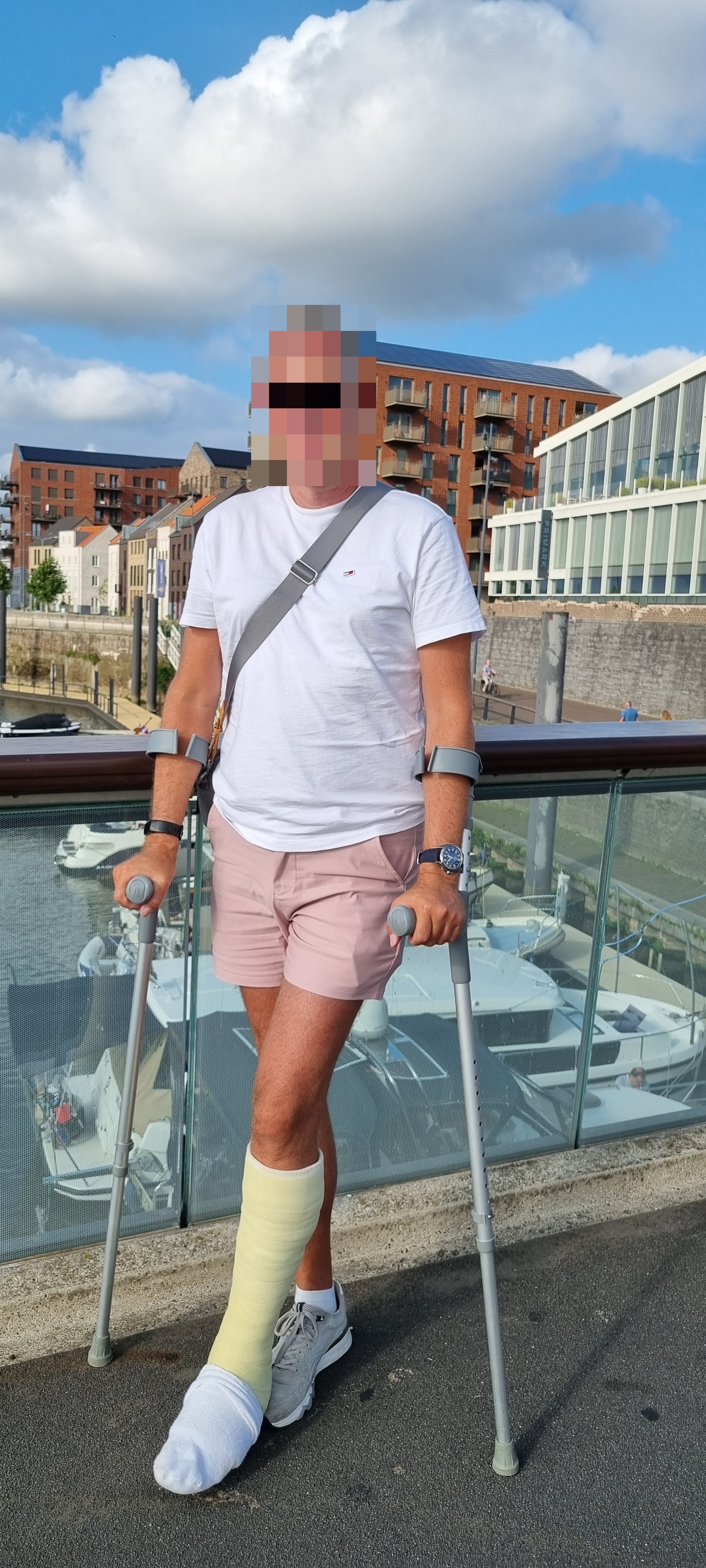
Man on crutches wearing a week old white synthetic short leg cast with sock over the toes

The short leg cast is designed to immobilize the lower leg and ankle, extending from just below the knee to the toes. It is used to treat less severe injuries, such as ankle fractures, foot fractures, or severe sprains. The cast restricts ankle movement while allowing knee mobility. In some cases, a toe plate is added to a short leg cast to provide additional protection for toe injuries or fractures. The toe plate is an extension of the cast that covers the toes, shielding them from external forces and reducing the risk of further injury during recovery. It also helps maintain proper alignment of the toes, preventing displacement of fractured bones or soft tissue damage. Toe plates are particularly useful for injuries where direct impact or accidental movement could hinder healing, such as complex fractures or severe soft tissue injuries in the toes.

=== Ambulation ===
When a patient is advised not to put weight on an injured limb, mobility aids like crutches, walkers, or wheelchairs can be used to help with movement during the recovery process. These aids protect the injured area while allowing the patient to move around safely. For those who cannot use crutches due to balance or strength challenges, a wheelchair or knee scooter might be suggested as a more stable mobility option. In certain situations, partial weight-bearing may be permitted, and specialized footwear can be fitted over the cast for added support. For leg casts that allow weight-bearing, the under-sole is usually reinforced to evenly distribute pressure and minimize strain on the injury. Walking casts, as they are called, come with a hard, flat sole to aid in walking while ensuring proper alignment and stability. Other alternative for ambulation with an injured leg include using an

== Specialized and rarely used casts ==
=== Cylinder ===
Cylinder casts are orthopedic devices used to immobilize the arm or leg while leaving the surrounding joints free, providing focused stabilization to specific regions. In the arm, a cylinder cast typically extends from the upper arm to just above the wrist, stabilizing injuries like isolated humeral fractures or post-surgical repairs that do not require elbow immobilization. For the leg, the cast extends from the thigh to just above the ankle, often used to manage patellar fractures, some types of tibial plateau injuries, or post-operative care following knee surgeries. The application involves precise alignment to maintain proper positioning of the affected area while ensuring adjacent joints remain mobile, allowing for some functional movement and reducing stiffness during recovery.

=== Body ===
Body casts, also known as full-body casts are devices designed to immobilize the trunk of the body, sometimes extending to the neck, head, or extremities. They are less commonly used today due to advances in less restrictive bracing systems and surgical techniques but remain crucial in specific cases where maximum immobilization is essential. Body casts are often used in pediatric patients, particularly young children, who may struggle to comply with wearing a back brace consistently. They are also employed after radical surgeries to repair spinal injuries, congenital deformities, or significant trauma to the spine, pelvis, or upper thigh.

A common variant, the body jacket, encases the trunk and includes shoulder straps to provide added stabilization, particularly for injuries involving the thoracic or lumbar spine. These casts are meticulously shaped to maintain spinal alignment and prevent movement that could disrupt healing. Despite their efficacy, body casts can be extremely uncomfortable due to their restrictive nature and the challenges they pose for hygiene and mobility. In some cases, openings or windows are incorporated into the cast to allow access for wound care or medical monitoring.

=== EDF cast ===
An EDF (elongation, derotation, flexion) cast is a specialized orthopedic device used in the treatment of Infantile Idiopathic Scoliosis. This method of correction was pioneered by UK scoliosis specialist Min Mehta and is a non-surgical approach designed to guide spinal growth and alignment during a critical developmental period. Scoliosis is a three-dimensional spinal deformity requiring correction in all planes—coronal, sagittal, and axial—and EDF casting addresses these complex needs. By employing traction, the EDF method elongates the spine, derotates the vertebrae and pelvis, and improves lordosis and overall body alignment, significantly enhancing the patient’s posture and physical function.

The EDF casting technique is distinct from Risser casting in its design and application. EDF casts are tailored to each child’s anatomy, with configurations either over or under the shoulder, depending on the curve pattern and severity. A key feature is the large mushroom-shaped opening on the front, which facilitates proper chest expansion and breathing. On the back, a small cutout is strategically placed on the concave side of the curve, stopping at the midline. This cutout has been shown to improve rotational correction and enhance spinal alignment compared to casts without it. The combination of elongation, derotation, and flexion in this casting method offers an effective early intervention to correct scoliosis and guide proper spinal development.

=== Spica cast ===
A spica cast encases the trunk of the body and one or more limbs, providing immobilization for injuries or conditions requiring stabilization across multiple joints. Spica casts can be used for both upper and lower extremities. For instance, a shoulder spica covers the trunk of the body and one arm, typically extending to the wrist or hand. These casts were once common for severe shoulder injuries but are rarely used today, as specialized splints and slings have largely replaced them, promoting early mobility to prevent joint stiffness during recovery.

A hip spica cast, by contrast, is used to immobilize the trunk and one or more legs. Variants include the single hip spica, which covers the trunk and one leg down to the ankle or foot; the double hip spica, which covers the trunk and both legs; and the one-and-a-half hip spica, which encases one leg fully and the other only to above the knee. The extent of trunk coverage depends on the specific injury or condition and the surgeon’s preference, ranging from the navel for spinal mobility to as high as the rib cage or armpits in rare cases. Hip spicas are commonly used to maintain reduction of femoral fractures, treat congenital hip dislocations in infants, and stabilize the hips and pelvis after surgery.

In some cases, a spica cast may not fully encase the legs, extending only to above the knee. These casts, known as pantaloon casts, are occasionally used to immobilize the lumbar spine or pelvis. When applied for such injuries, the trunk portion of the cast typically extends to the armpits to ensure adequate stabilization.

== Hygiene ==
Maintaining proper hygiene while wearing a cast is crucial to ensure patient comfort, prevent skin irritation, and reduce the risk of infection. Since casts are often made of non-breathable materials and remain in place for weeks, they can create an environment prone to moisture buildup, which can lead to odors, skin irritation, or fungal growth. Patients are advised to keep the cast completely dry, as moisture can weaken the cast material and compromise its integrity. Waterproof covers or plastic bags secured with elastic can be used during bathing to protect the cast, but immersing the cast in water should always be avoided unless it is specifically designed to be waterproof.

To maintain hygiene around the cast, patients should clean and moisturize the exposed skin near the cast edges, being cautious not to let any liquids seep inside. A damp cloth with mild soap can be used for cleaning, followed by gentle drying. Avoid inserting objects, such as sticks or sharp items, into the cast to alleviate itching, as this can cause skin abrasions or damage the cast lining. If itching becomes unbearable or if there is persistent discomfort, a healthcare provider should be consulted rather than attempting to adjust the cast.

For long-term casts, regular inspections by a medical professional are recommended to ensure the skin underneath remains healthy and the cast fits properly. Unpleasant odors, excessive itching, or discharge from the cast are potential signs of an infection or skin breakdown, requiring immediate medical attention. Maintaining proper cast hygiene not only contributes to physical comfort but also supports a safe and successful healing process.

== Casting materials ==
Casts typically come in two main types of material, fiberglass, and plaster, though it is less common. Plaster casts have several limitations, including weight, which restricts movement, and skin complications such as dryness, itching, rashes, and infections, particularly in hot weather. Plaster can also break down if exposed to moisture. The cast removal process, which involves a noisy oscillating saw, can cause distress, especially in children, though it is generally painless. Due to these drawbacks, fiberglass casts were developed in the 1970s, offering a lighter, more durable, and water-resistant alternative, though they still have limitations in terms of skin irritation and moisture management.

=== Plaster casts ===
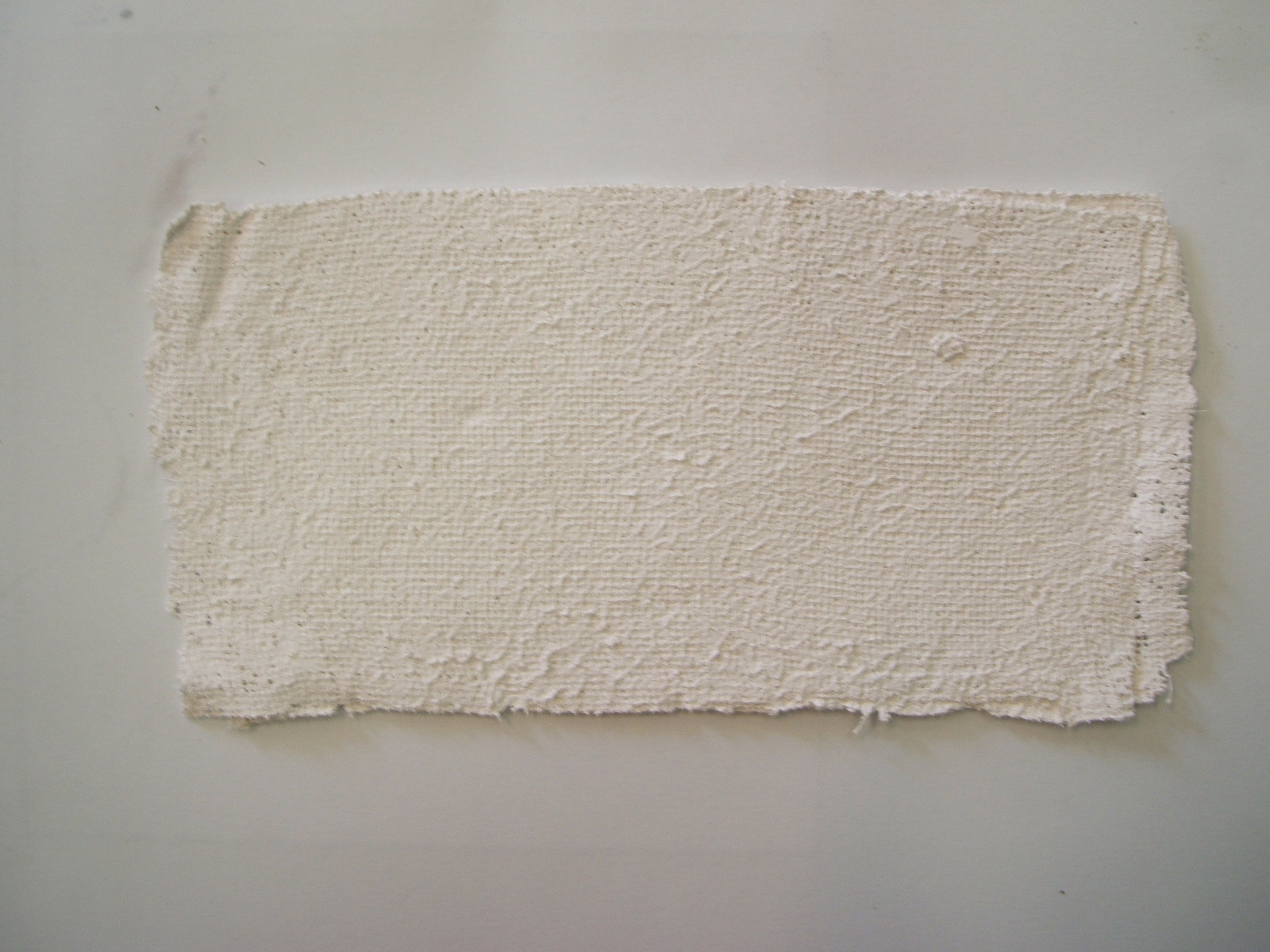
Cotton and plaster casting material (plaster cast), 4ply

Plaster casts consist of a cotton bandage that has been combined with plaster of paris, which hardens after it has been made wet. Plaster of Paris is calcined gypsum (roasted gypsum), ground to a fine powder by milling. When water is added, the more soluble form of calcium sulfate returns to the relatively insoluble form, and heat is produced.

2 (CaSO_{4}·½ H_{2}O) + 3 H_{2}O → 2 (CaSO_{4}.2H_{2}O) + Heat

The setting of unmodified plaster starts about 10 minutes after mixing and is complete in about 45 minutes; however, the cast is not fully dry for 72 hours.

=== Fiberglass casts ===
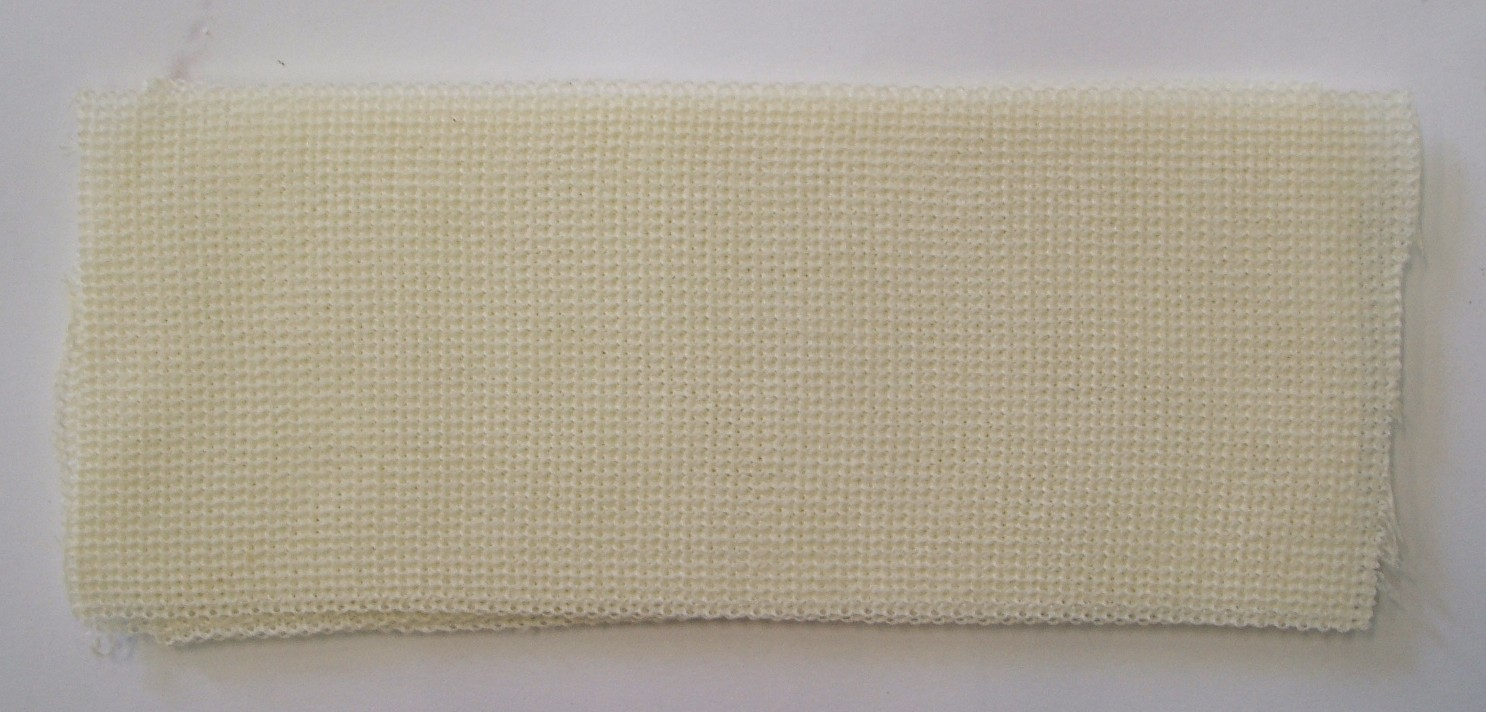
Fiberglass and polyurethane casting material, 4ply

Bandages of synthetic materials are also used—often knitted fiberglass bandages impregnated with polyurethane, sometimes bandages of thermoplastic. These are lighter and dry much faster than plaster bandages. However, plaster can be more easily moulded to make a snug and therefore more comfortable fit. In addition, plaster is much smoother and does not snag clothing or abrade the skin.

=== Cast liner ===
Traditional cast liners are made from cotton or synthetic materials, which help absorb sweat and keep the skin dry. However, in modern casting, fiberglass or polyester liners are often used, offering greater durability and comfort. Some liners are specifically designed to be waterproof, allowing patients to bathe or swim while wearing their casts. These waterproof liners are typically made from materials like polyurethane or special synthetic fibers that prevent water from seeping into the cast. While waterproof liners offer significant convenience, they may increase the application time and cost of the cast

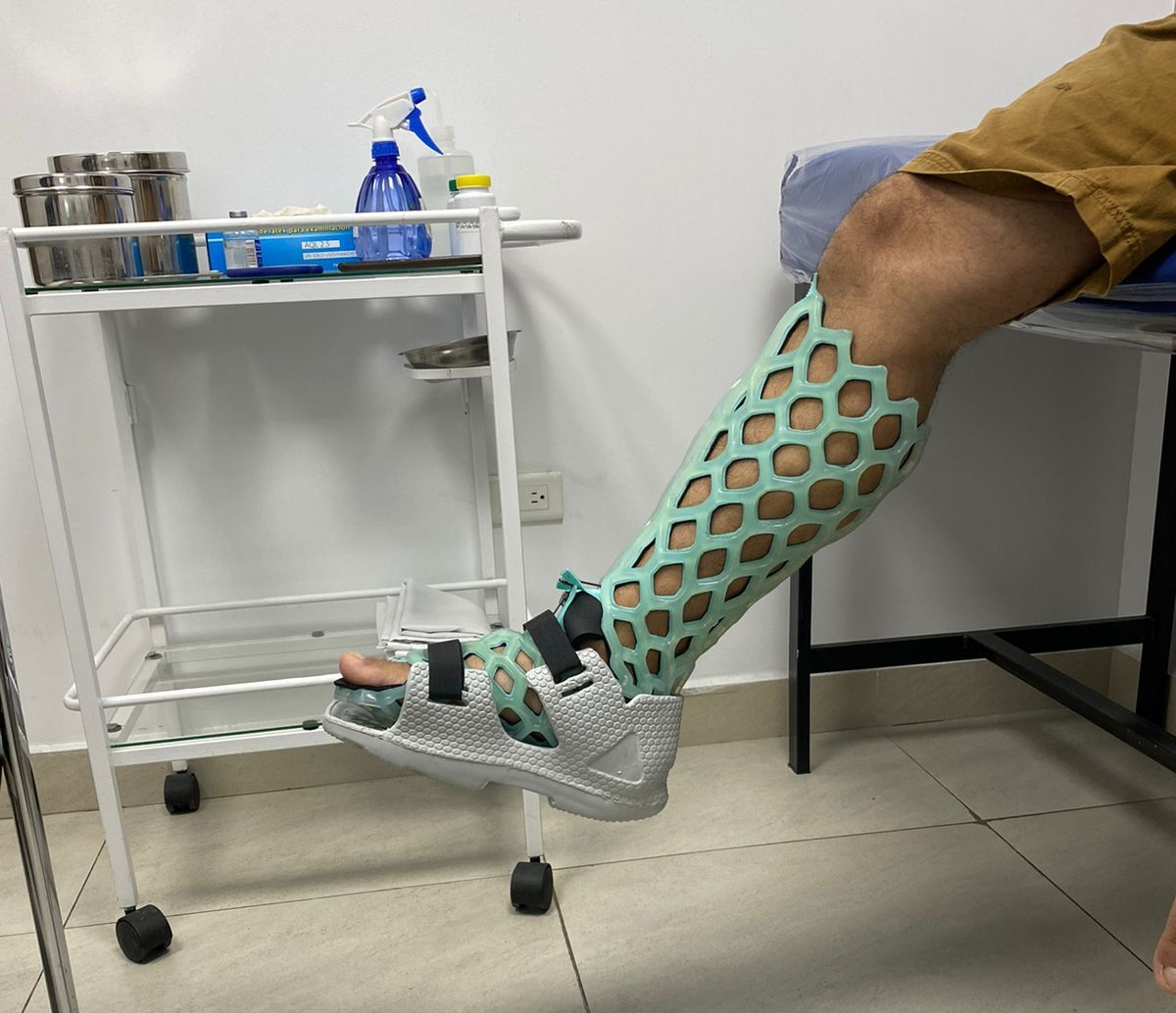
FlexiOH orthopedic cast for foot and ankle fracture

=== Washable casts ===
There are some washable casts like FlexiOH which provide good ventilation and maintain good skin hygiene. With this cast, patients are able to bathe and go out in the rain. They are becoming more common in orthopedic immobilization photo-curing specialty-resin technology, which enables a waterproof, washable, lightweight, strong and comfortable way of recovering from fractures.

== Alternative methods of immobilization ==
Alternative immobilization techniques offer non-cast methods for stabilizing injuries, providing options that may be more comfortable, adjustable, or suitable for specific conditions. While traditional casts are commonly used for fractures and soft tissue injuries, alternatives are increasingly being utilized to address various patient needs and preferences.

One prominent alternative is the splint, which is often used for fractures that are not as severe or when a temporary immobilization method is required. Splints are typically made from materials like fiberglass, aluminum, or plastic and are easier to apply and adjust than casts. They can be used for injuries like sprains, minor fractures, or post-surgical stabilization. Unlike casts, splints are generally open on one or both sides, allowing for adjustments as swelling fluctuates during the healing process. They also provide more flexibility and can be removed for hygiene or rehabilitation purposes.

Orthopedic brace are another alternative, commonly used for joint injuries or soft tissue sprains and strains. Braces provide support and stabilize joints like the knee, ankle, or wrist. They are often used for conditions such as ligament sprains, tendinitis, or as post-operative support. Braces are usually made of fabric, neoprene, or metal components, allowing for greater mobility and easier removal compared to casts. They can be particularly useful for injuries that require gradual rehabilitation and controlled movement.

For certain types of fractures or injuries, Traction (orthopedics) is an effective immobilization method. Traction involves using a pulling force to align bones and reduce fractures, particularly in cases involving the spine, pelvis, or long bones. It can be achieved through a variety of mechanisms, including skin traction (using adhesive materials attached to the skin) or skeletal traction (which involves pins or wires placed directly into the bone). Traction helps maintain the correct alignment and promotes healing without the need for a cast, especially in more complex fractures.

In cases where the injury requires complete immobilization but not the rigidity of a cast, an orthopedic boot, also known as a CAM boot (controlled ankle motion) may be used, especially for foot or ankle injuries. These options are designed to protect the injured area while still allowing limited mobility. Orthopedic boots are often preferred in weight-bearing fractures, as they provide stability while allowing the patient to walk with crutches or other mobility aids.

== Removal ==
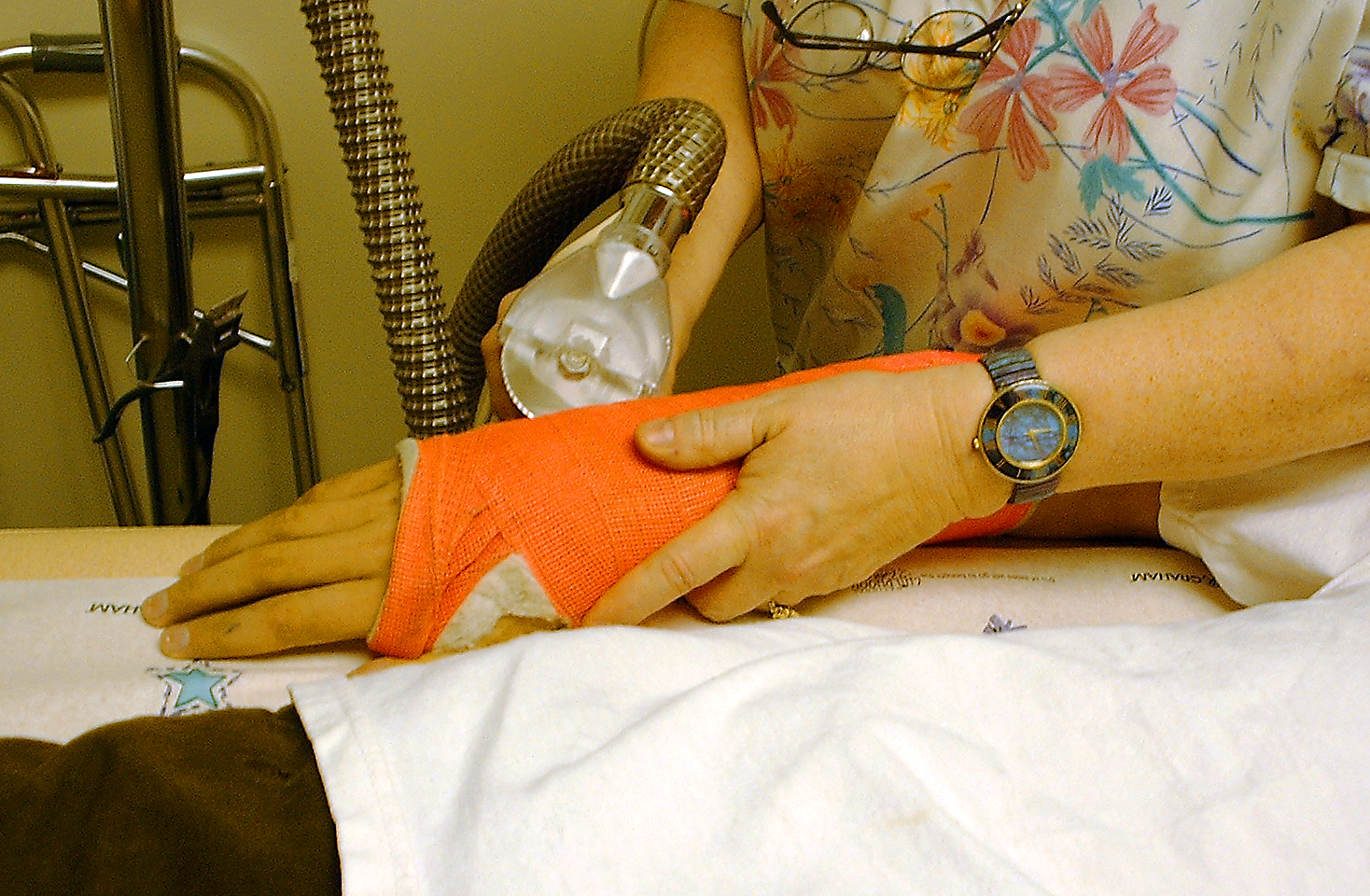
An orange short arm cast with a fiberglass top layer being cut and removed with a specialized cast saw

Casts are typically removed by perforation using a cast saw, an oscillating saw designed to cut rigid material such as plaster or fiberglass while not harming soft tissue. Manually operated shears, patented in 1950 by Neil McKay, may be used on pediatric or other patients who may be affected by the noise of the saw.

== History ==
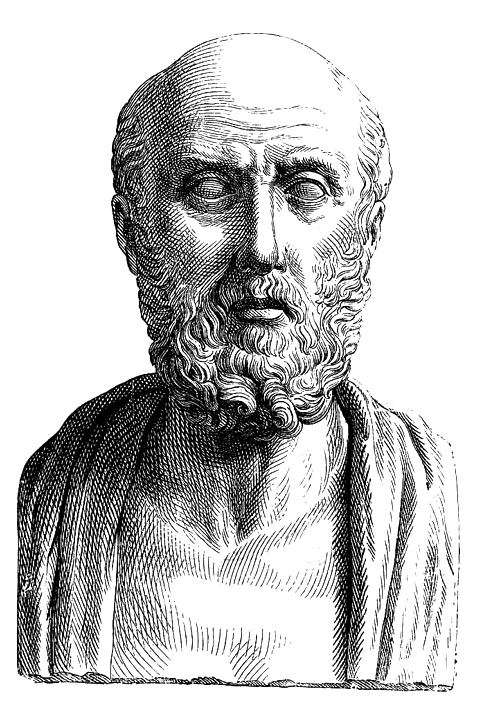
Hippocrates: a conventionalized image in a Roman "portrait" bust (19th-century engraving)

The earliest methods of holding a reduced fracture involved using splints. These are rigid strips laid parallel to each other alongside the bone. The Ancient Egyptians used wooden splints made of bark wrapped in linen. They also used stiff bandages for support that were probably derived from embalming techniques. The use of plaster of Paris to cover walls is evident, but it seems it was never used for bandages. Ancient Hindus treated fractures with bamboo splints, and the writings of Hippocrates discuss management of fractures in some detail, recommending wooden splints plus exercise to prevent muscle atrophy during the immobilization. The ancient Greeks also used waxes and resins to create stiffened bandages and the Roman Celsus, writing in AD 30, describes how to use splints and bandages stiffened with starch. Arabian doctors used lime derived from sea shells and albumen from egg whites to stiffen bandages. The Italian School of Salerno in the twelfth century recommended bandages hardened with a flour and egg mixture as did medieval European bonesetters, who used casts made of egg white, flour, and animal fat. By the sixteenth century the famous French surgeon Ambroise Paré (1517–1590), who championed more humane treatments in medicine and promoted the use of artificial limbs, made casts of wax, cardboard, cloth, and parchment that hardened as they dried.

These methods all had merit, but the standard method for the healing of fractures was bed rest and restriction of activity. The search for a simpler, less-time-consuming, method led to the development of the first modern occlusive dressings, stiffened at first with starch and later with plaster of Paris. The ambulatory treatment of fractures was the direct result of these innovations. The innovation of the modern cast can be traced to, among others, four military surgeons, Dominique Jean Larrey, Louis Seutin, Antonius Mathijsen, and Nikolai Ivanovich Pirogov.

Dominique Jean Larrey (1768–1842) was born in a small town in southern France. He first studied medicine with his uncle, a surgeon in Toulouse. After a short tour of duty as a naval surgeon, he returned to Paris, where he became caught up in the turmoil of the French Revolution, being present at the Storming of the Bastille. From then on, he made his career as a surgeon in France's revolutionary and Napoleonic armies, which he accompanied throughout Europe and the Middle East. As a result, Larrey accumulated a vast experience of military medicine and surgery. One of his patients after the Battle of Borodino in 1812 was an infantry officer whose arm was amputated at the shoulder. The patient was evacuated immediately following the operation and passed from Russia, through Poland and Germany. When the dressing was removed on his arrival home in France, the wound had healed. Larrey concluded that the fact that the wound had been undisturbed had facilitated healing. After the war, Larrey began stiffening bandages using camphorated alcohol, lead acetate and egg whites beaten in water.

An improved method was introduced by Louis Seutin, (1793–1865) of Brussels. In 1815 Seutin had served in the allied armies in the war against Napoleon and was on the field of Waterloo. At the time of the development of his bandage he was chief surgeon in the Belgium army. Seutin's "bandage amidonnee" consisted of cardboard splints and bandages soaked in a solution of starch and applied wet. These dressings required 2 to 3 days to dry, depending on the temperature and humidity of the surroundings. The substitution of Dextrin for starch, advocated by Velpeau, the man widely regarded as the leading French surgeon at the beginning of the 19th century, reduced the drying time to 6 hours. Although this was a vast improvement, it was still a long time, especially in the harsh environment of the battlefield.

A good description of Seutin's technique was provided by Sampson Gamgee who learned it from Seutin in France during the winter of 1851–52 and went on to promote its use in Britain. The limb was initially wrapped in wool, especially over any bony prominences. Pasteboard was then cut into shape to provide a splint, and dampened so it could be molded to the limb. The limb was then wrapped in bandages before a starch coating was applied to the outer surface. Seutin's technique for the application of the starch apparatus formed the basis of the technique used with plaster of Paris dressings today. The use of this method led to the early mobilization of patients with fractures and a marked reduction in hospital time required.

=== Plaster casts ===
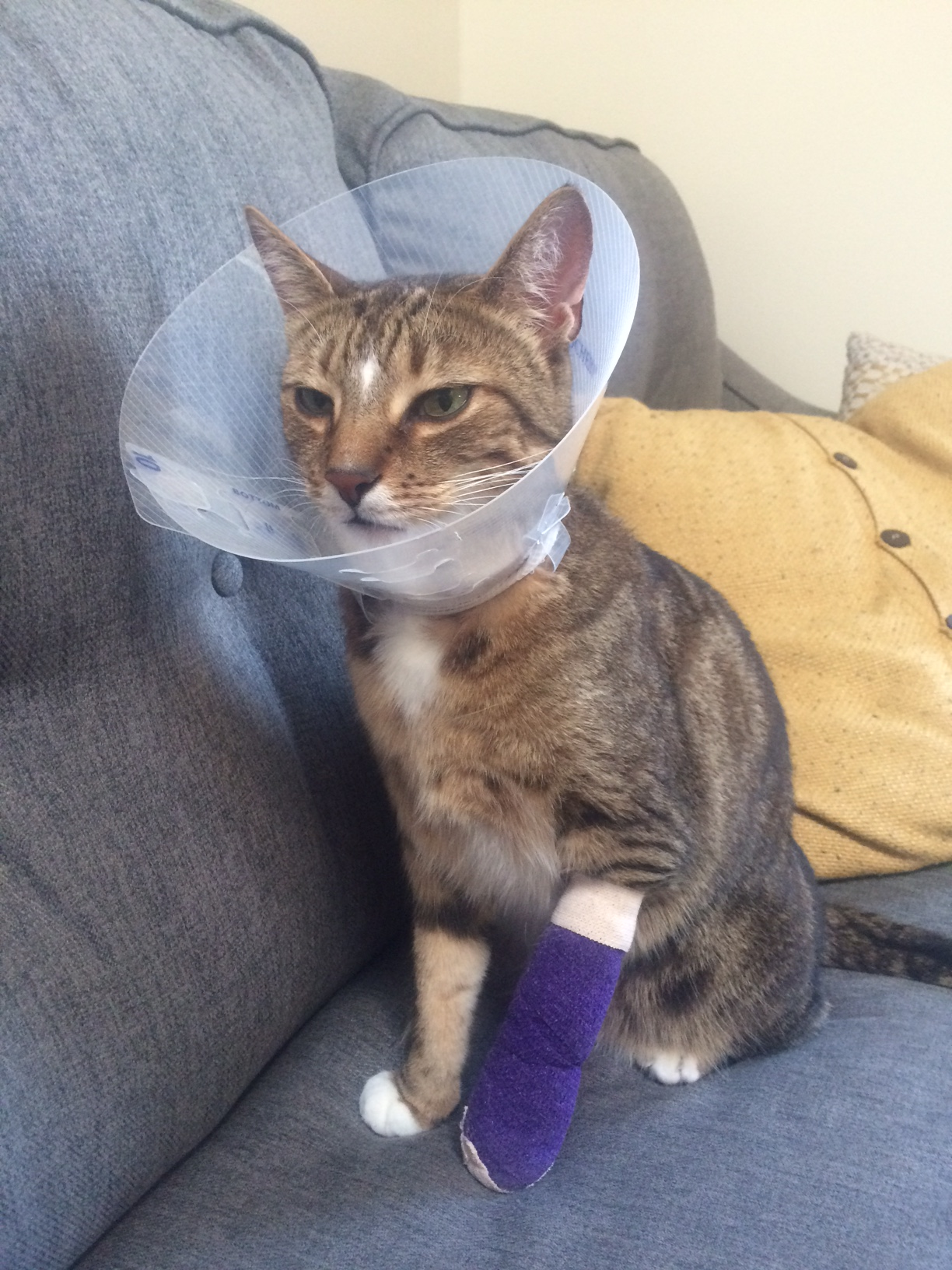
A cat wearing a cast on its left front leg; the animal is also wearing an Elizabethan collar to prevent them from damaging the cast (i.e. from biting it) while the injury heals

Although these bandages were an improvement over Larrey's method, they were far from ideal. They required a long time to apply and dry and there was often shrinkage and distortion. A great deal of interest had been aroused in Europe around 1800 by a British diplomat, consul William Eton, who described a method of treating fractures that he had observed in Turkey. He noted that gypsum plaster (plaster of Paris) was moulded around the patient's leg to cause immobilization. If the cast became loose due to atrophy or a reduction in swelling, then additional gypsum plaster was added to fill the space. Adapting the use of plaster of Paris for use in hospitals, however, took some time. In 1828, doctors in Berlin were treating leg fractures by aligning the bones in a long narrow box, which they filled with moist sand. Substitution of plaster of Paris for the sand was the next logical step. Such plaster casts did not succeed however as the patient was confined to bed due to the casts being heavy and cumbersome.

Plaster of Paris bandages were introduced in different forms by two army surgeons, one at a peacetime home station and another on active service at the front. Antonius Mathijsen (1805–1878) was born in Budel, the Netherlands, where his father was the village doctor. He was educated in Brussels, Maastricht and Utrecht obtaining the degree of doctor of medicine at Gissen in 1837. He spent his entire career as a medical officer in the Dutch Army. While he was stationed at Haarlem in 1851, he developed a method of applying plaster of Paris bandages. A brief note describing his method was published on January 30, 1852; it was followed shortly by more complete accounts. In these accounts Mathijsen emphasized that only simple materials were required and the bandage could be quickly applied without assistance. The bandages hardened rapidly, provided an exact fit and could be windowed or bivalved (cut to provide strain relief) easily. Mathijsen used coarsely woven materials, usually linen, into which dry plaster of Paris had been rubbed thoroughly. The bandages were then moistened with a wet sponge or brush as they were applied and rubbed by hand until they hardened.

Plaster of Paris dressings were first employed in the treatment of mass casualties in the 1850s during the Crimean War by Nikolai Ivanovich Pirogov (1810–1881). Pirogov was born in Moscow and received his early education there. After obtaining a medical degree at Dorpat (now Tartu, Estonia) he studied at Berlin and Göttingen before returning to Dorpat as a professor of Surgery. In 1840, he became the professor of surgery at the academy of military medicine in St. Petersburg. Pirogov introduced the use of ether anesthesia to Russia and made important contributions to the study of cross-sectional human anatomy. With the help of his patron, the grand duchess Helene Pavlovna, he introduced female nurses into the military hospitals at the same time that Florence Nightingale was beginning a similar program in British military hospitals.

Seutin had travelled through Russia demonstrating his 'starched bandage', and his technique had been adopted by both the Russian army and navy by 1837. Pirogov had observed the use of plaster of Paris bandages in the studio of a sculptor who used strips of linen soaked in liquid plaster of Paris for making models (this technique, called "modroc," is still popular). Pirogov went on to develop his own methods, although he was aware of Mathijsen's work. Pirogov's method involved soaking coarse cloth in a plaster of Paris mixture immediately before application to the limbs, which were protected either by stockings or cotton pads. Large dressings were reinforced with pieces of wood.

As time passed and the method moved more into the mainstream some disagreement arose as to the problems associated with cutting off air to skin contact, and also some improvements were made. Eventually Pirogov's method gave way to Mathijsen's. Among the improvements suggested as early as 1860 was that of making the dressing resistant to water by painting the dried plaster of Paris with a mixture of shellac dissolved in alcohol. The first commercial bandages were not produced until 1931 in Germany, and were called Cellona. Before that the bandages were made by hand at the hospitals.

As a plaster cast is applied, it expands by approximately 0.5%. The less water used, the more linear expansion occurs. Potassium sulfate can be used as an accelerator and sodium borate as a retarder to control setting time.

== See also ==
- Anne Acheson, British-Irish sculptor who, together with Elinor Hallé, invented and developed orthopedic plaster casts
- Back brace
- Buddy wrapping
- Cervical collar
- Dental braces
- Halo (medicine)
- Kendrick extrication device
- Long spine board
- H. Winnett Orr, US Army surgeon who developed orthopedic plaster casts
- Orthotics
