= Nikolay Pirogov =

Russian medical scientist (1810–1881)

- Николай Пирогов
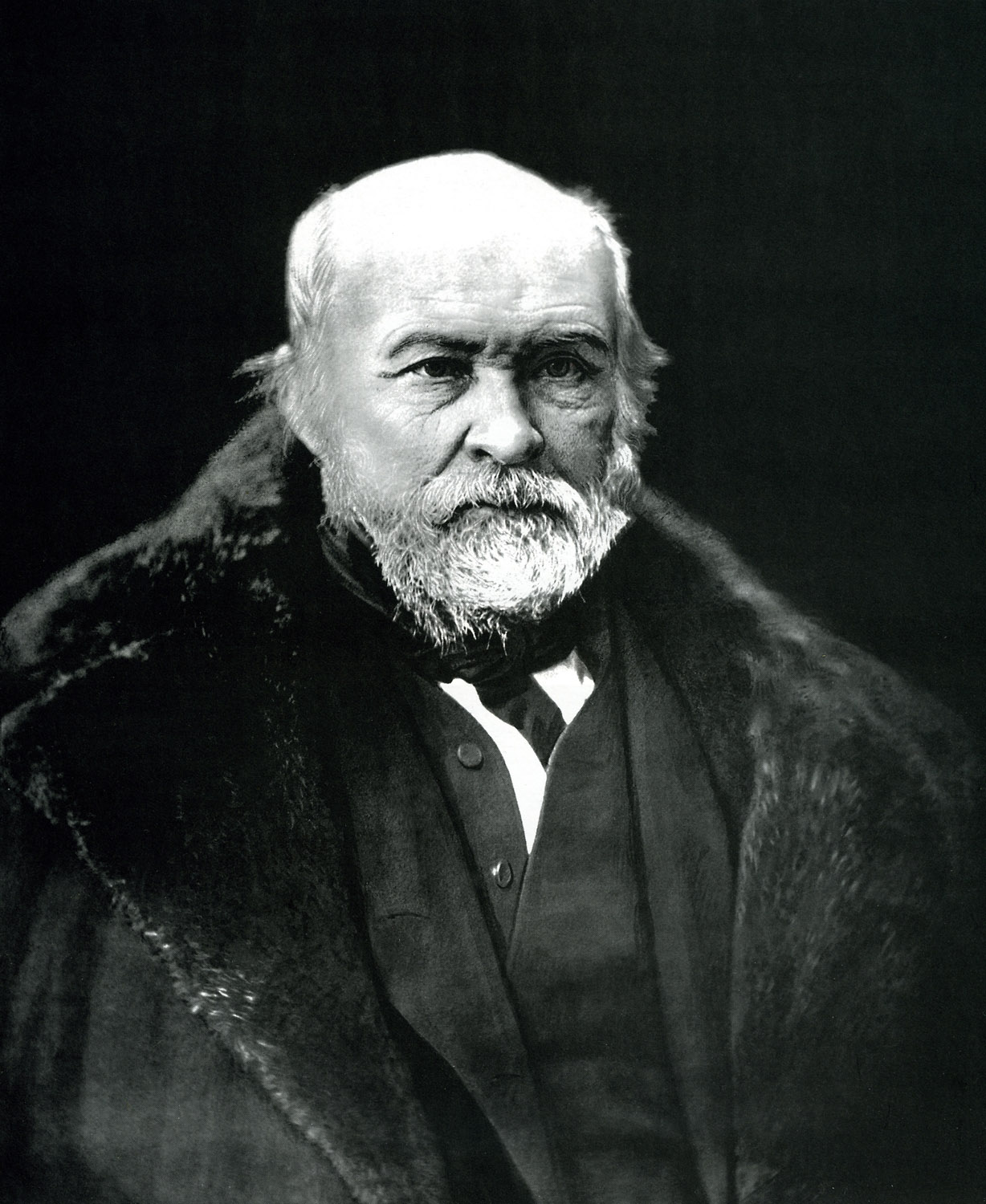
- Pirogov in 1870
- Born: 25 November 1810; Moscow, Moscow Governorate, Russian Empire
- Died: 5 December 1881 (aged 71); Vishnya village, Podolia Governorate, Russian Empire (now Vinnytsia, Ukraine)
- Education: Imperial Moscow University
- Known for: Field surgery
- Awards: Demidov Prize (1844, 1851 and 1860)
- Scientific career
- Fields: Medicine, Surgery, Anatomy
- Workplaces: University of Dorpat

Nikolay Ivanovich Pirogov (Russian: Николай Иванович Пирогов; 25 November [O.S. 13 November] 1810 – 5 December [O.S. 23 November] 1881) was a Russian scientist, medical doctor, pedagogue, public figure, and corresponding member of the Russian Academy of Sciences (1847), one of the most widely recognized Russian physicians. Considered to be the founder of field surgery, he was the first surgeon to use anaesthesia in a field operation (1847) and one of the first surgeons in Europe to use ether as an anaesthetic. He is credited with the invention of various kinds of surgical operations and developing his own technique of using plaster casts to treat fractured bones.

== Biography ==
=== Childhood and training ===
Nikolay Pirogov was born in Moscow, the 13th of 14 children of Ivan Ivanovich Pirogov (born around 1772), a major in the commissary service and a treasurer at the Moscow Food Depot whose own father came from peasants and served as a soldier in Peter the Great's army before retiring and opening a brewery in Moscow; Pirogov's mother Elizaveta Ivanovna Pirogova (née Novikova) belonged to an old Moscow merchant family and was four years younger than her husband.

He learned to read in several languages as a child. His father died in 1824, leaving his family destitute. Pirogov originally intended to become a civil servant, but the family doctor Yefrem Mukhin who was a professor of anatomy and physiology at the Imperial Moscow University persuaded the authorities to accept a 14-year-old Pirogov as a student.

In 1828 he finished the Faculty of Medicine and entered the Imperial University of Dorpat (University of Tartu) where he studied under Professor Moyer (who had himself studied under Antonio Scarpa) and received a doctorate on ligation of the ventral aorta in 1832. During his doctoral studies, he participated in the elimination of the cholera epidemic, saw many deaths from it, on the basis of this he made many sketches of posthumous changes in the muscles of those who died from cholera, which he subsequently combined in the corresponding atlas.

In May 1833 he travelled to Berlin, meeting such surgeons as Karl Ferdinand von Graefe, Johann Nepomuk Rust and Johann Friedrich Dieffenbach at the University of Berlin. Professor Bernhard von Langenbeck taught Pirogov how to properly use the scalpel. Pirogov also visited the University of Göttingen and on his return served as a professor at the University of Dorpat (1836–1840).

=== Years as doctor and field surgeon ===
In October 1840 Pirogov took up an appointment as professor of surgery at the Imperial Academy of Military Medicine in Saint Petersburg, and undertook three years of military service in this period. He first used ether as an anaesthetic in 1847, and investigated cholera from 1848. In search of an effective teaching method, he decided to apply anatomical research on frozen corpses. Pirogov called it “ice anatomy”. Thus, a new medical discipline was born – topographic anatomy. After a few years of such study anatomy Pirogov published the first anatomical atlas, Topographical anatomy of the human body (vol. 1–4, 1851–1854).

In 1847 he left for the Caucasus, where the Russian army waged a war against the local mountain peoples. Here, he wanted to test the operating methods he had developed in the field. In the Caucasus, he first applied dressing with bandages soaked in starch.

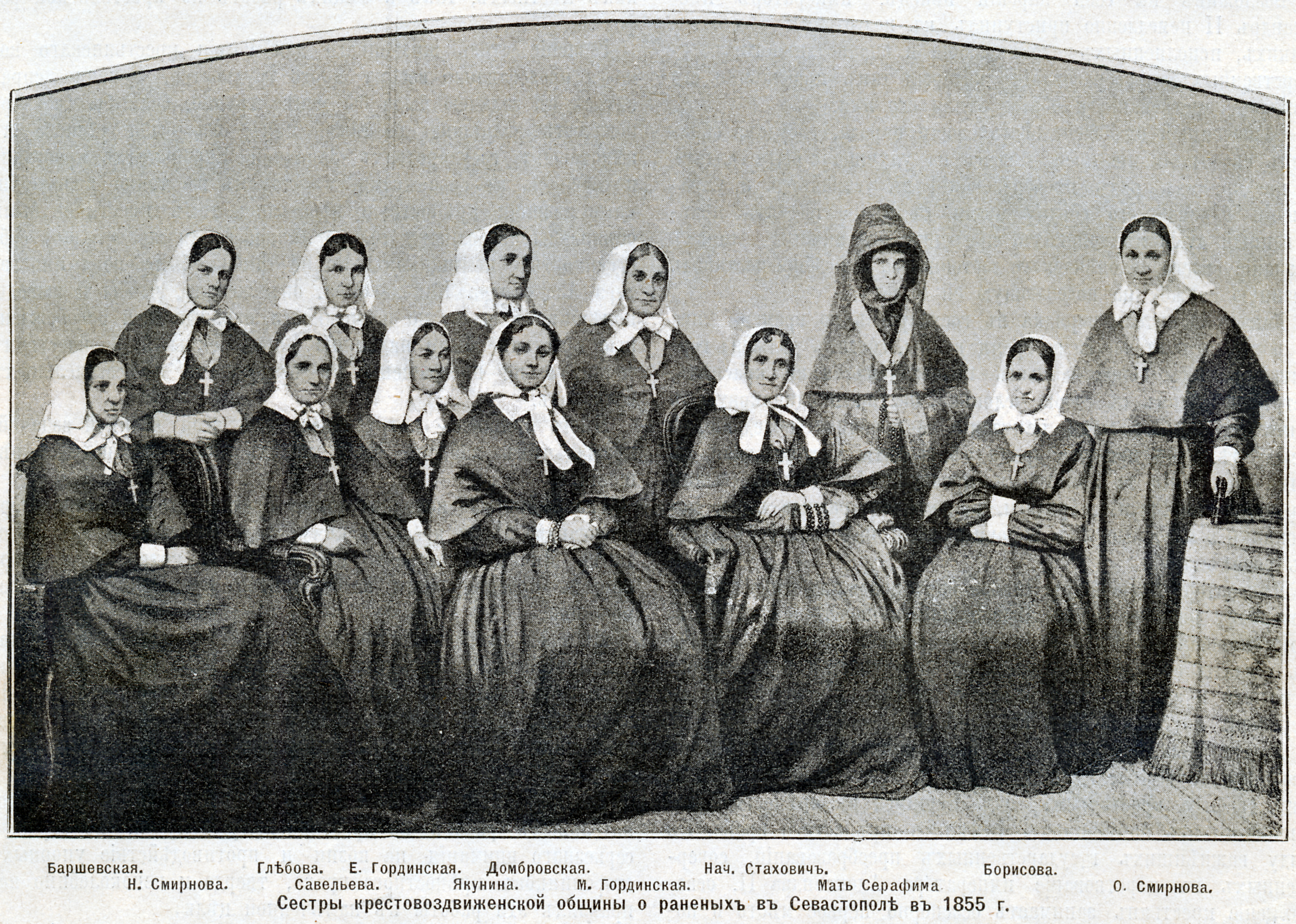
Russian Sisters of Mercy in the Crimea, 1854-1855

He worked as an army surgeon in the Crimean War, arriving in Simferopol on 11 December 1854. From his works in the Crimea, he is considered to be the father of Russian field surgery. He followed the work of Louis-Joseph Seutin in introducing plaster casts for setting broken bones, and developed a new osteoplastic method for amputation of the foot, known as the "Pirogov amputation". He was also the first to use anesthesia in the field, particularly during the siege of Sevastopol (1854–55), and he introduced in Russian army a system of triage – sorting wounded soldiers into five categories. He encouraged female volunteers as an organised corps of nurses, the Khrestovozdvizhenskaya (ru) at the Saint Petersburg Charity Encyclopedia community of nurses established by Grand Duchess Yelena Pavlovna in 1854.

=== Return and retirement ===
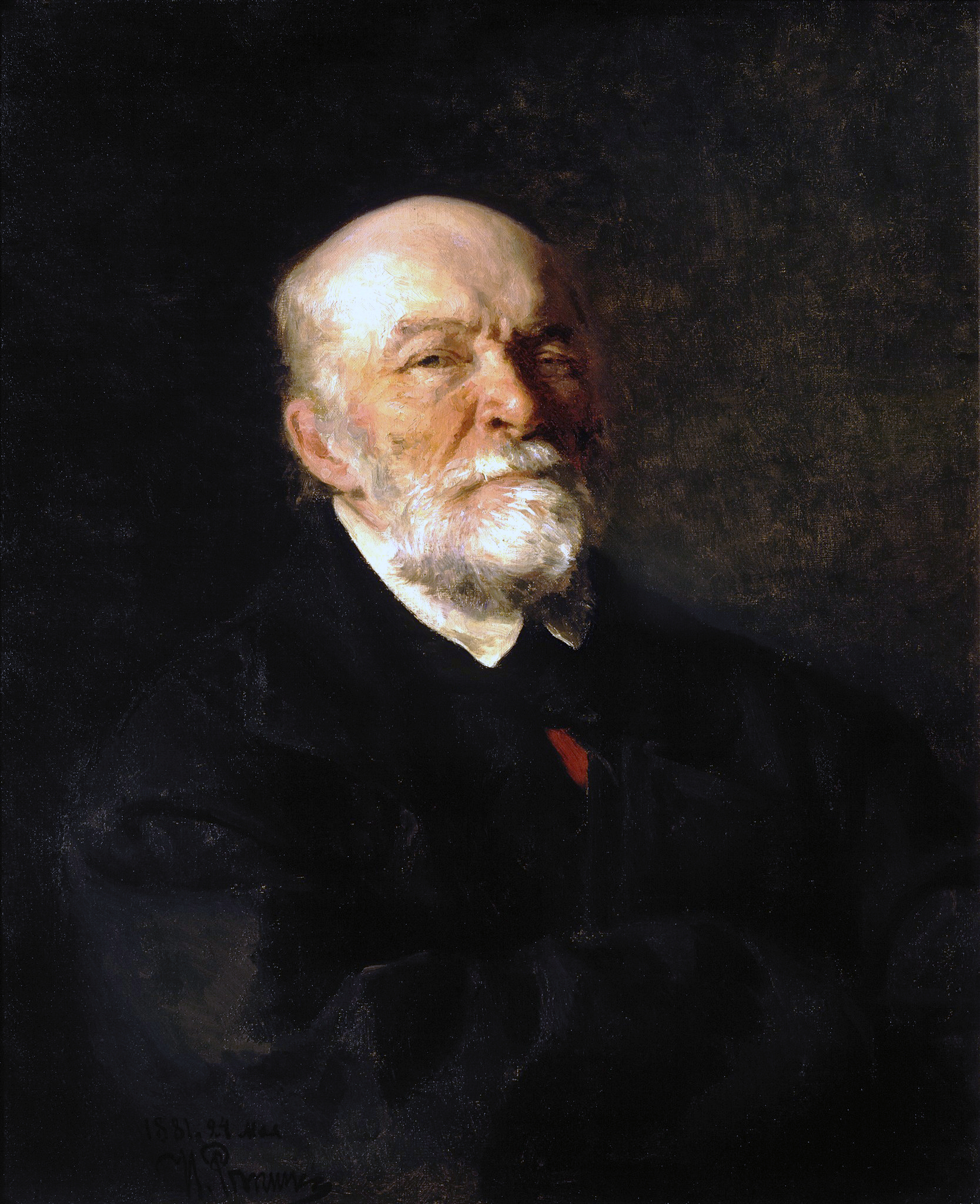
Portrait of Nikolay Pirogov by Ilya Repin, 1881

In 1856 after the end of war, he returned to Saint Petersburg and withdrew from the academy following the suggestion to work as a superintendent of schools of the Odessa Educational District which united several governorates. He wrote an influential paper on the problems of pedagogy, arguing for the education of the poor, non-Russians, and women. (He was influential in his family's decision to educate his niece Henriette Joudra who would go on to earn her medical doctorate and become the first woman to open a private medical practice in Geneva, Switzerland).

He also argued against early specialisation, and for the development of secondary schools. In 1858 he received the rank of Privy Councillor and was transferred to Kiev as a superintendent of schools of the Kiev Educational District after disagreements with the Odessa governor general. In 1861 he became a member of the Main Directorate of Schools, serving at the Ministry of National Education up until his death. Same year he bought an estate in the Vishnya village near Vinnytsia.

In 1862, he took charge of a delegation of Russian students sent overseas to prepare for professorship. He lived in Heidelberg and at one point he treated Giuseppe Garibaldi's injury sustained at Aspromonte on 28 August. In 1866 upon return to Russia he settled down at his estate, treating local peasants and establishing a free clinic.

In 1870 he visited the battlefields and field hospitals of the Franco-Prussian War as a representative of the Russian Red Cross, and in 1877–1878 spent several months working as a field surgeon during the Russo-Turkish War, treating both Russian and Bulgarian soldiers and organizing field hospitals. In 1879 he published The Old Physician's Diary and "Questions of Life".

He last appeared in public on 24 May 1881 and died later that year at his Vishnya estate, Podolia Governorate (modern-day Vinnytsia, Ukraine). His body is preserved using embalming techniques he himself developed, and rests in a church in Vinnytsia. Compared to the corpse of Lenin, which undergoes thorough maintenance in a special underground clinic twice a week, the body of Pirogov rests untouched and unchanging: it is said that only dust has to be brushed off of it. It resides at room temperature in a glass-lid coffin (while Lenin's body is preserved at a constant low temperature).

=== Personal life ===
Nikolay Pirogov was married twice. His first wife was Ekaterina Dmitrievna Berezina (1822–1846), who belonged to an old noble family, whom he married in November 1842. They had two sons: Nikolay (1843–1891), а physicist, and Vladimir (1846–1914), a historian and archaeologist. She died at the age of 24 from complications after the birth of her second son.

He married for the second time in June 1850 to Aleksandra Antonovna, née Baroness Bistrom (1828–1902), with whom he had no children.

== Legacy ==
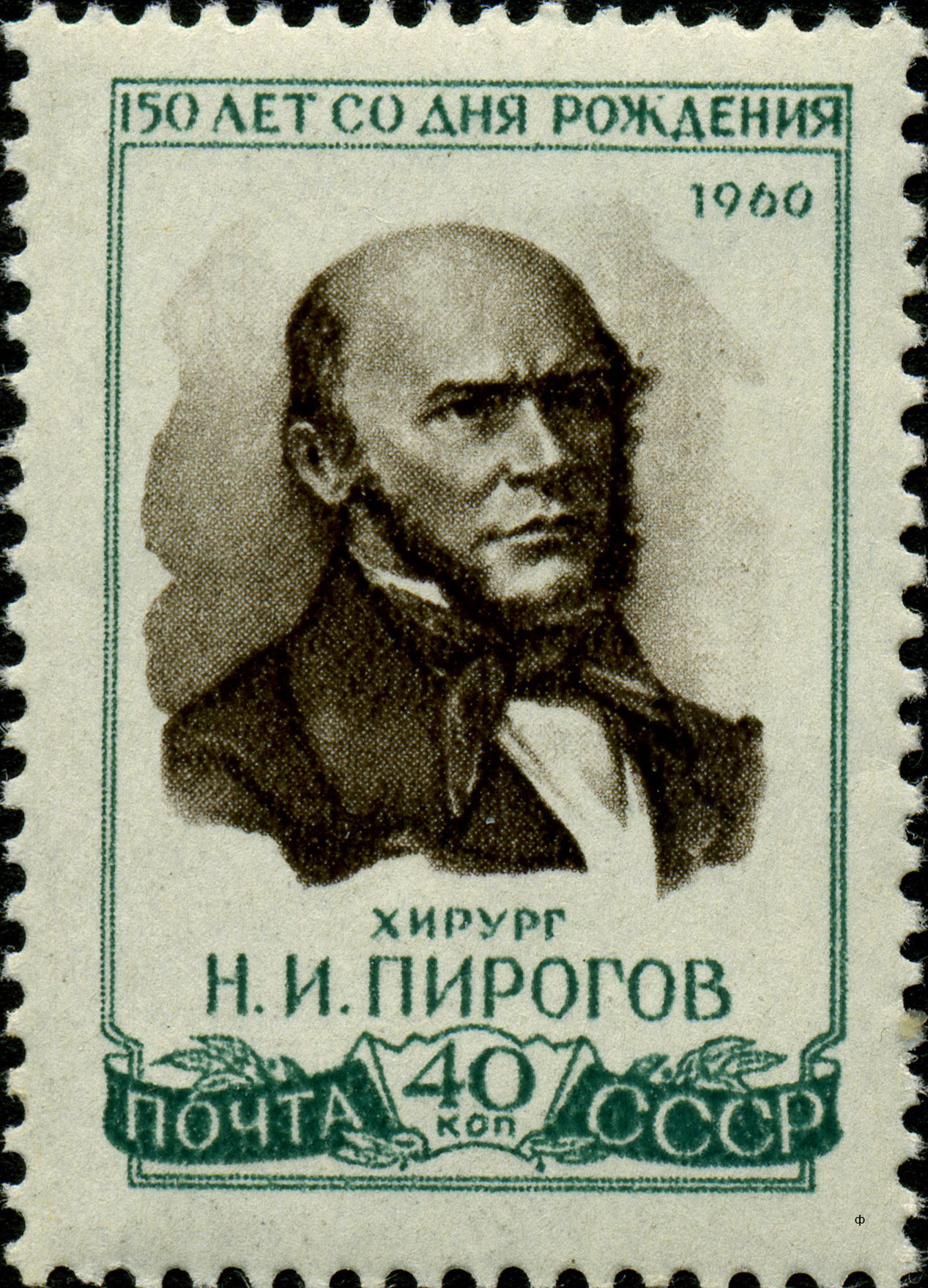
Soviet 1960 stamp, published during his 150th anniversary

Nikolay Pirogov was from 1847 corresponding member of the Russian Academy of Sciences and received in 1844, 1851 and 1860 the Demidov Prize by the academy. He was appointed honorary citizen of Moscow in 1881. The Pirogov Society was founded four years after his death, which aims for better medical training and treatment in Russia.

The Pirogov Museum is located in Vinnytsia, Ukraine at his former estate and clinic. Near this 1947 building is a mausoleum which is used as a family chapel and in which his embalmed body is visible in public. Pirogov Glacier in Antarctica, the large Pirogov Hospital in Sofia, Bulgaria and the 2506 Pirogov asteroid, discovered in August 1976 by Russian astronomer Nikolai Chernykh, are all named in honour of him. The Russian National Research Medical University is named after him, as was the Odesa State Medical University; Vinnytsia Medical University was named after N. Pirogov in 1960. Stamps with his portrait were published in the Soviet Union in 1949 and his 150th anniversary in 1960. The highest humanitarian prize in the Soviet Union was the Pirogov Gold Medal.

Apart from his developed foot amputation techniques, several anatomical structures were named after him, such as the Pirogoff angle; the Pirogoff's aponeurosis, a structure from fascia and the aponeurosis of the biceps; the Pirogoff triangle, a triangular area located between the mylohyoid muscle, the intermediate tendon of the musculus digastricus and the hypoglossal nerve.

A bust portraying Russian admirals and sailors from the Crimean War, including Nikolay Pirogov, was erected at Sevastopol Park in Dnipro (Ukraine) after renovations in 2008. Pirogov's bust and the other busts in Dnipro were removed in December 2021.

The key component of Nikolai Ivanovich Pirogov's legacy is the scientific school he created and his outstanding students, who include the following renowned medical figures: L. A. Beckers, A. P. Walte, D. I. Vykhodtsev, P. P. Zablotsky-Desyatovsky, V. A. Karavaev, A. A. Kiter, E.-A. Ya. Krassovsky, N. V. Sklifosofsky, Y. K. Shimanovsky, K. K. Strauch

== Trivia ==
- According to a study conducted in 2015, Pirogov was included in "Russia team on medicine". This list includes fifty-three famous Russian medical scientists from the Russian Federation, the Soviet Union, and the Russian Empire who were born in 1757–1950. Physicians of all specialities listed here. Among them Vladimir Bekhterev, Vladimir Demikhov, Sergei Korsakoff, Ivan Pavlov, Victor Skumin.
