= Pirogov's Estate Museum =

National Pirogov's Estate Museum
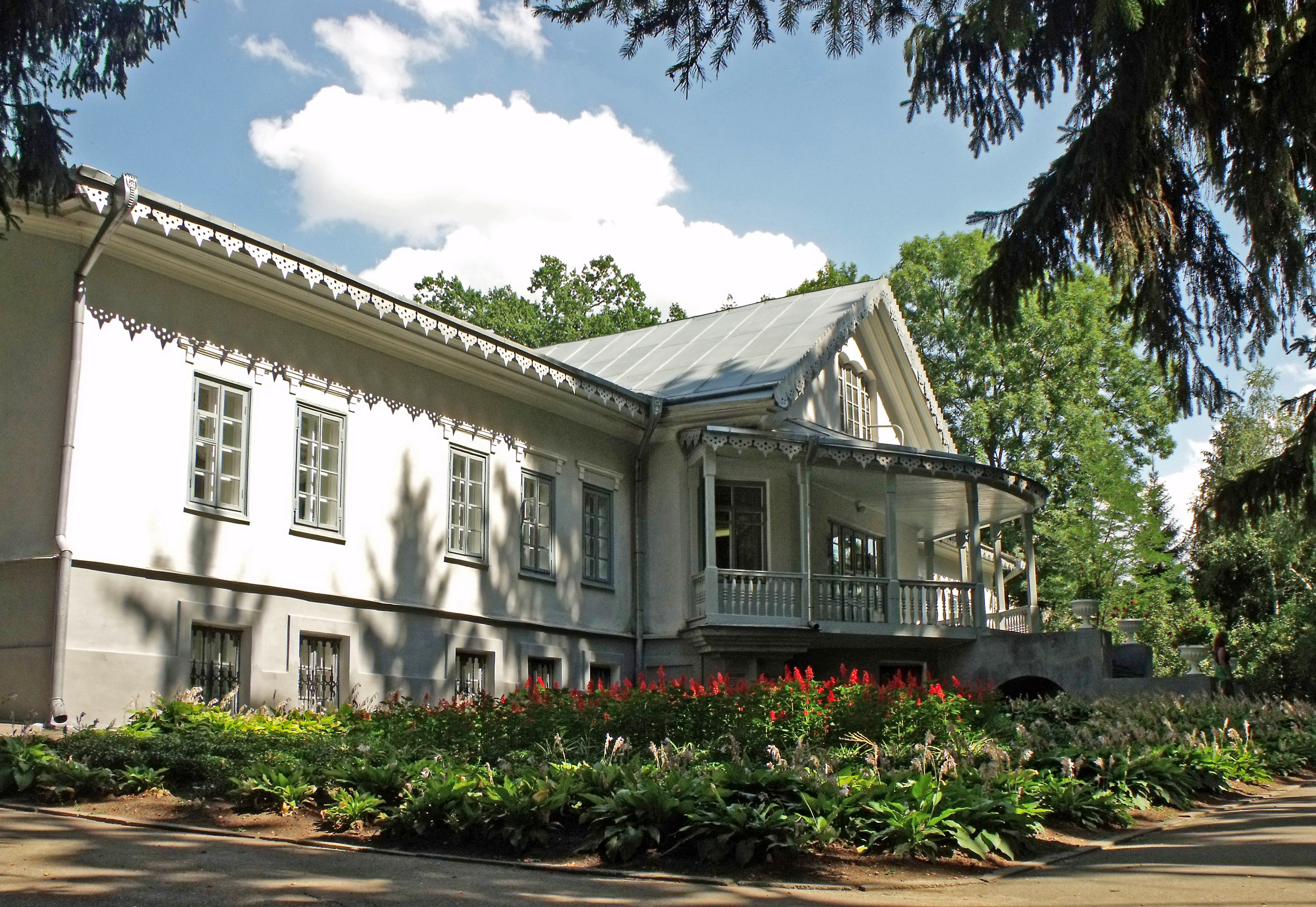
- Established: 1944
- Location: Vinnytsia, Ukraine
- Coordinates: 49°12′57.71″N 28°24′30.15″E
- Website: www.pirogov.com.ua

Immovable Monument of National Significance of Ukraine
- Official name: Садиба хірурга, анатома і педагога М. І. Пирогова (Estate of the surgeon, anatomist and teacher M. I. Pirogov)
- Type: History
- Reference no.: 020003-Н

The National Museum-Estate of Nikolay Ivanovich Pirogov (Ukrainian: Національний музей-садиба М. І. Пирогова) is a museum in Vinnytsia dedicated to the life and work of Nikolay Ivanovich Pirogov, a prominent Russian scientist, surgeon, and educator. The Pirogov estate is a national historical landmark and a nature conservation site of nationwide importance.

The museum complex is located on the southwestern outskirts of the city of Vinnytsia, within the eastern part of the Pirogovo district (formerly the separate estate-village of Vyshnia, which later merged with Sheremetka-Pirogovo).

It includes:

- The house where Pirogov lived, which now hosts an exhibition about his life and work
- A pharmacy-museum featuring interiors of a reception room and an operating room
- A church-necropolis, which contains a sarcophagus with the embalmed body of the scientist
- A memorial park where trees planted by Pirogov are still preserved

== History ==
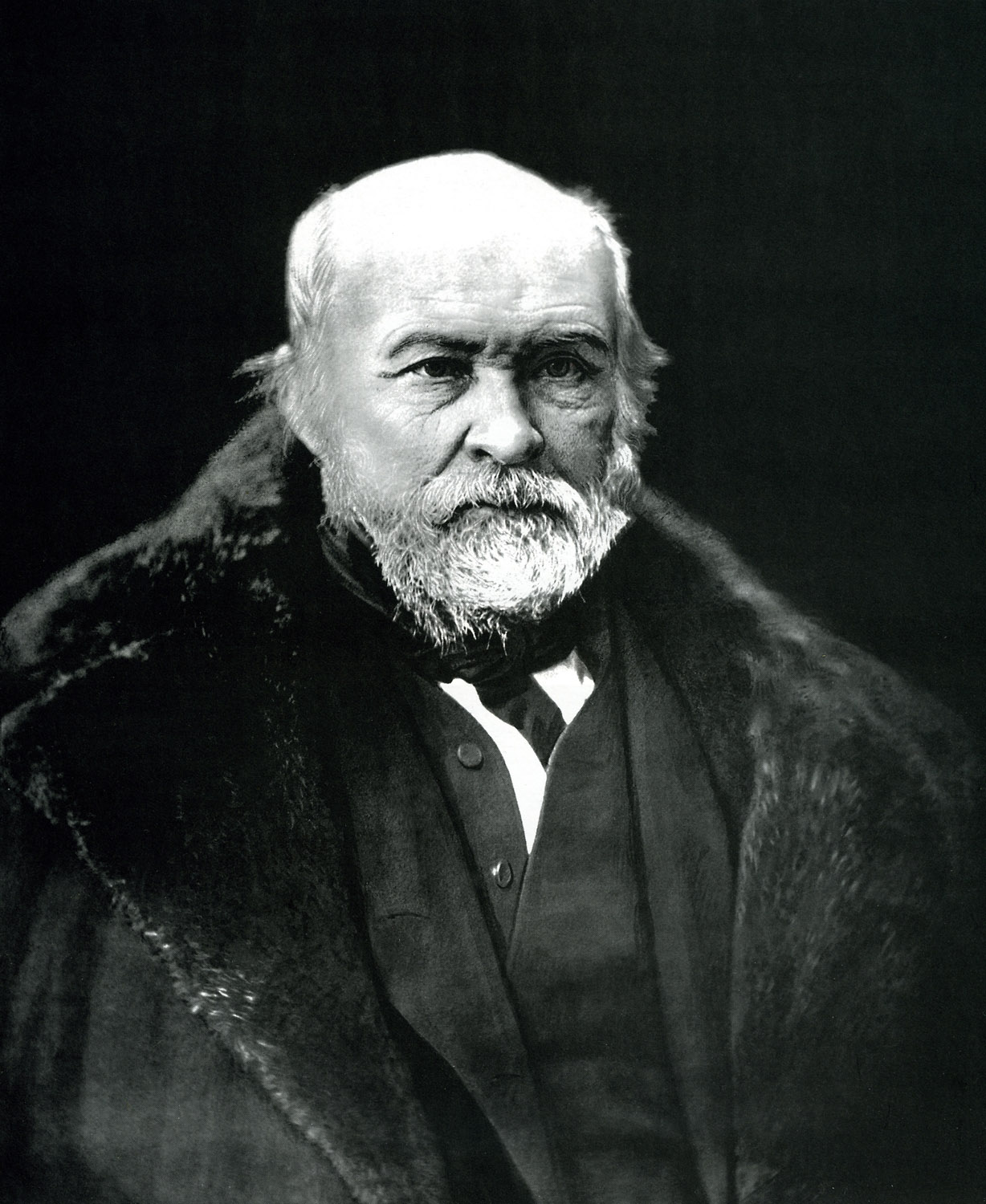
Pirogov's photograph from 1870

=== Family estate ===
In 1861, after resigning from the post of Trustee of the Kyiv Educational District, Pirogov settled at the Vyshnya estate near Vinnytsia, which he had purchased at a Kyiv auction in 1859. In 1866, he built a house, a pharmacy and a hospital. He landscaped the park where he also cultivated medicinal plants.

It was here that he died on 23 November 1881 due to upper jaw cancer. In his will, Pirogov declared that his body should be preserved. As per his will, his body was embalmed by Saint Petersburg physician David Vyvodtsev and later placed in the family crypt. In 1885, a church was built over the crypt based on the design by Victor Sychugov, and consecrated in honor of Saint Nicholas the Wonderworker.

=== 1917—1947 ===
Until 1902, the estate was maintained by Pirogov’s widow, Alexandra. It then passed to their son Vladimir and later to granddaughters L. M. Mazirova and O. M. Hershelman. After the February revolution in 1917, they emigrated and the estate was left abandoned. Later, Pirogov’s burial site was looted, with his sword (a gift from Emperor Franz Joseph) and a metal cross being stolen.

In 1920, the half-ruined house was given to American workers, who formed a commune named after John Reed. Later, it was transferred to an agricultural research station, and from 1936, it became part of the Vinnytsia Regional Infectious Disease Hospital.

Following the liberation of Vinnytsia during World War II, General-Colonel Y. I. Smirnov learned that the former estate of Nikolay Pirogov had survived the war but was in a severely neglected state. As a lifelong admirer of Pirogov, Smirnov submitted a proposal to Marshal K. E. Voroshilov, then Deputy Chairman of the Council of People’s Commissars. This led to an official order on October 27, 1944, mandating the creation of a museum at the estate and the preservation of Pirogov’s remains, setting in motion a large-scale effort to restore and memorialize the site.

Consequently, the first re-embalming of Pirogov's body was carried out between 5 May and 5 June 1945 by a commission of scientists from Leningrad, Kyiv, Kharkiv, and Vinnytsia.

The estate was formally integrated as a branch of the Red Army’s Military Medical Museum by directive of the General Staff on 2 March 1945. The restoration efforts were aimed at ensuring the museum would open in time for the 135th anniversary of Pirogov’s birth in November 1945. The museum was conceived not only as a memorial to Pirogov but also as a center for the study of his contributions to surgery, medical education, and military medicine.

=== Opening of the museum ===
The museum was opened on 9 September 1947.

In the following years, the museum's exhibition was expanded and improved. By 1960, in time for the 150th anniversary of Pirogov’s birth, his study and pharmacy were reconstructed, and several personal items and manuscripts were acquired. In the post-Soviet period, the interior of the church-necropolis was restored, and the operating room, reception area, and pharmacy were renovated and modernized. A special laboratory was also established, and since 1994, it has been used for the periodic re-embalming of Pirogov’s body.

Between 1980 and 1985, repair and restoration work was undertaken on the church complex. From 1992 to 1997, the interior was reconstructed.

== Collections and exhibits ==
The Museum features a collection of approximately 16,500 items, with over 1,500 exhibits on display across 10 halls of the main building, a gallery, and six rooms of a private pharmacy. The displays include manuscripts, photographs, personal belongings, surgical instruments, paintings, sculptures, and printed works. The museum also houses a library of 7,000 books and magazines, many of which are rare publications related to Pirogov’s scientific contributions and the history of medicine. A marble plaque on the building marks the years Pirogov lived there, and a bust, created by sculptor Krestovsky, stands in the park. The exhibits are arranged chronologically to reflect the key moments of Pirogov’s life and work.

== Features ==
One Interesting feature of it is The National Pirogov's Estate museum includes an important site known as the Pirogovs Church-Necropolis, which houses the preserved body of the renowned scientist. Later, as per his wishes, his wife Aleksandra was laid to rest there, followed by their eldest son.
