= Charles Edward Hallé =

English painter

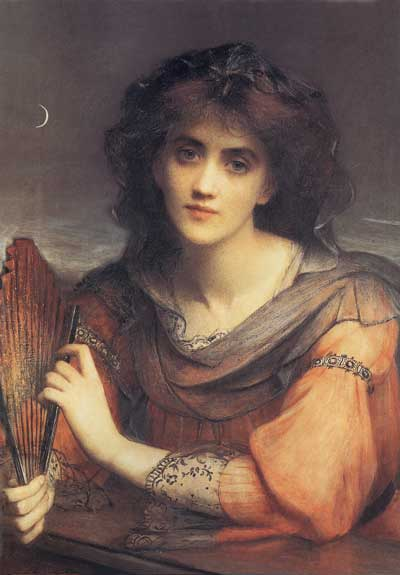
Luna by Charles Edward Hallé

Charles Edward Hallé (1846–1914), sometimes given as Edward Charles Hallé, was an English Victorian painter and gallery manager. He was a painter of history scenes, genre scenes, and portraits.

Although born only two years before the founding the Pre-Raphaelite Brotherhood, stylistically Hallé was aligned with the aesthetic of the so-called "second wave" of that group, and artists such as Edward Burne-Jones.

== Life ==
Born in Paris, Hallé was the son of Sir Charles Hallé, the German-born pianist and orchestra conductor, who emigrated to England during the revolution of 1848. His younger sister was sculptor and inventor Elinor Hallé CBE. His first professors were Richard Doyle and Carlo Marochetti when he entered the School of the Royal Academy in London. At seventeen years of age he travelled to France and worked with Victor Mottez, a student of Ingres. From France he travelled to Italy. He was attracted to the tradition of Neo-Classicism found in Rome.

Upon his return to London he exhibited four paintings at the Royal Academy in London in 1866, and then departed for Venice. He studied the techniques of the Venetian masters and tried to paint in their style. He then returned to England and settled permanently in London.

In 1877, with J. Comyns Carr, he assisted Lord Coutts Lindsay in the creation of the Grosvenor Gallery. In 1888 with Burne-Jones, he founded the New Gallery in Regent Street. He exhibited frequently in the two galleries he helped found. His works have been displayed in the museum in Sheffield.

in January 1900 he joined the South African Conciliation Committee which was looking for a peaceful settlement of the 2nd Boer War.

In 1909, he published his reminiscences, Notes from a Painter's Life, a valuable if somewhat cantankerous source-book.

Charles Hallé is mentioned very fondly by Isadora Duncan in her 1927 book My Life, published the year of her death. She describes the activities she and Charles enjoyed together in Paris, long strolls, trips to the countryside, gallery tramping and dining. She said, "I danced for him in the forest and he made sketches of me."

== Gallery ==
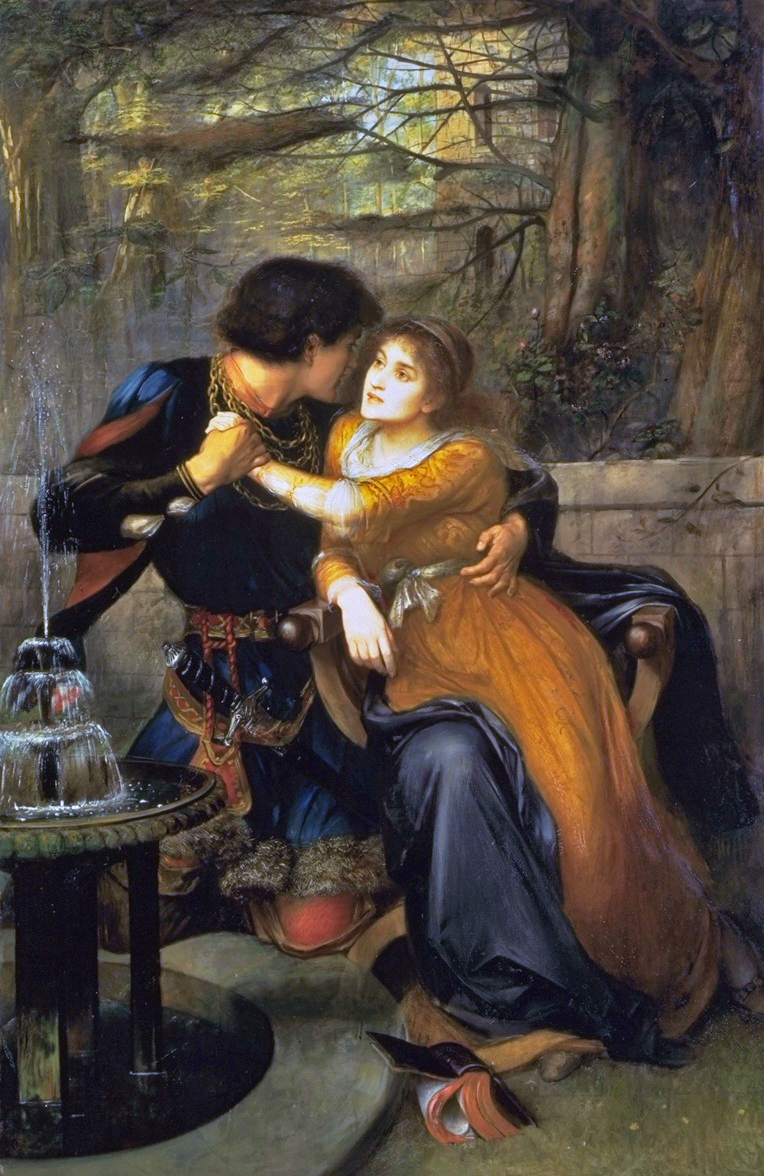
Paolo and Francesca

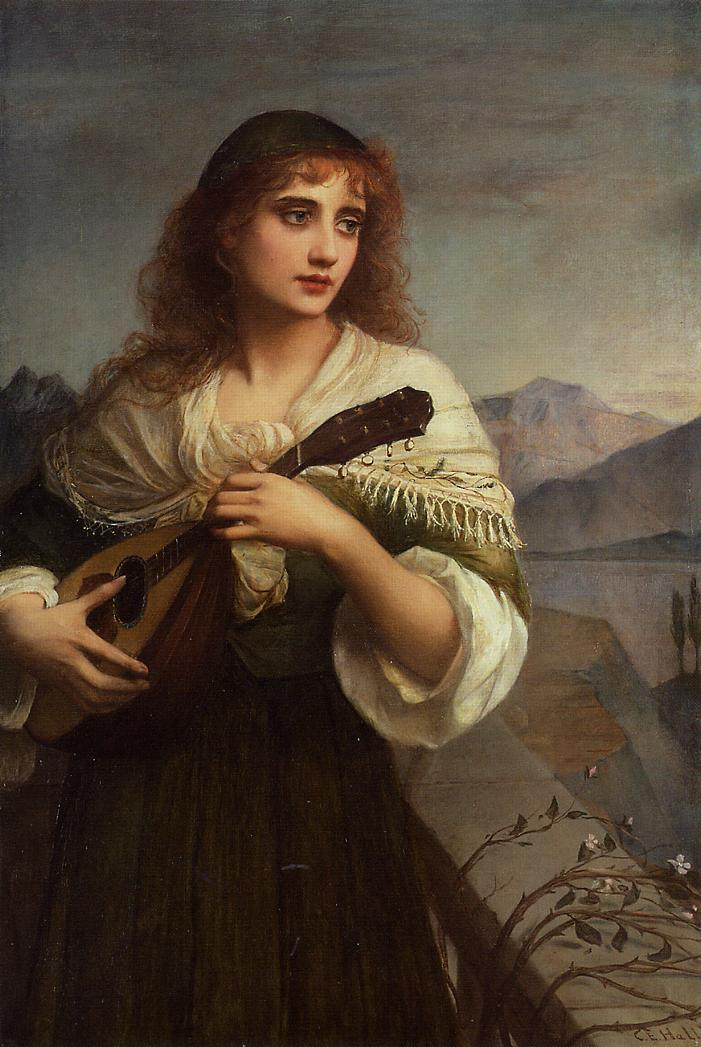
Francesca and her Lute

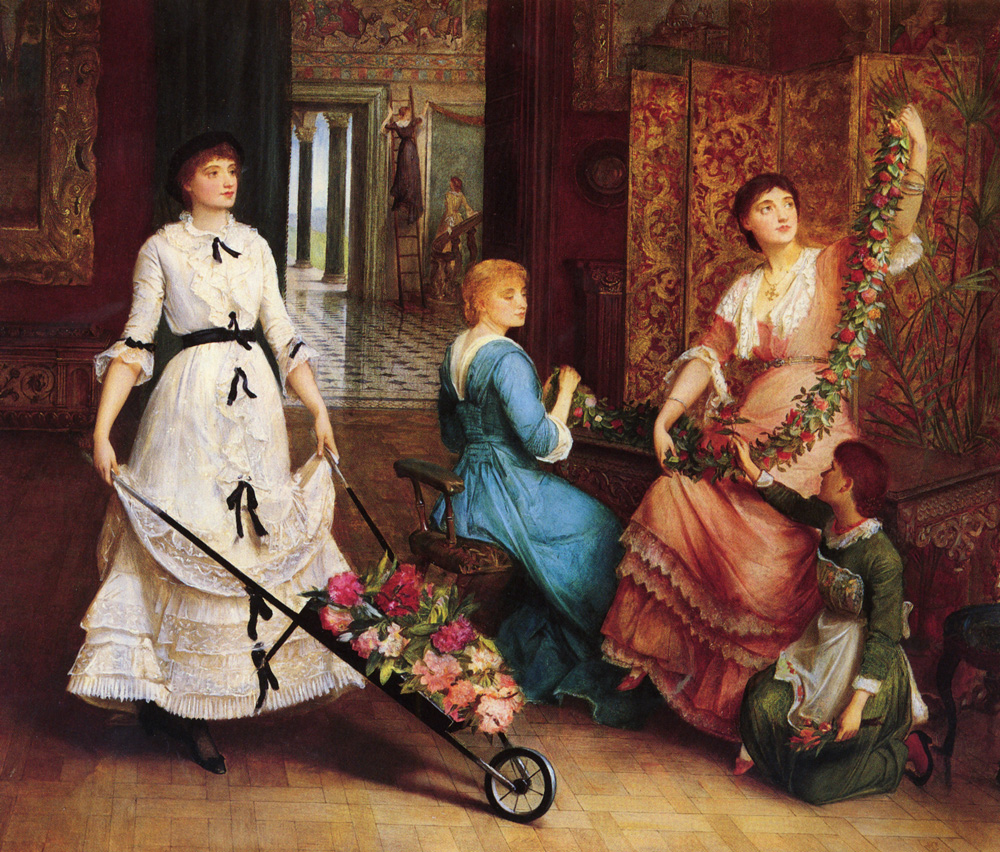
Preparing for the Ball
