= Crutch =

Mobility aid

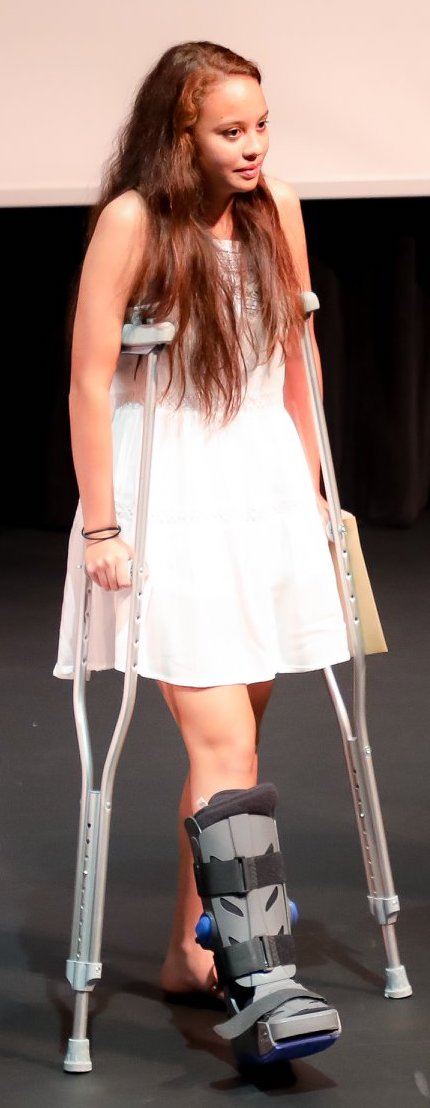
Underarm (axillary) crutches used to keep weight off the injured leg.

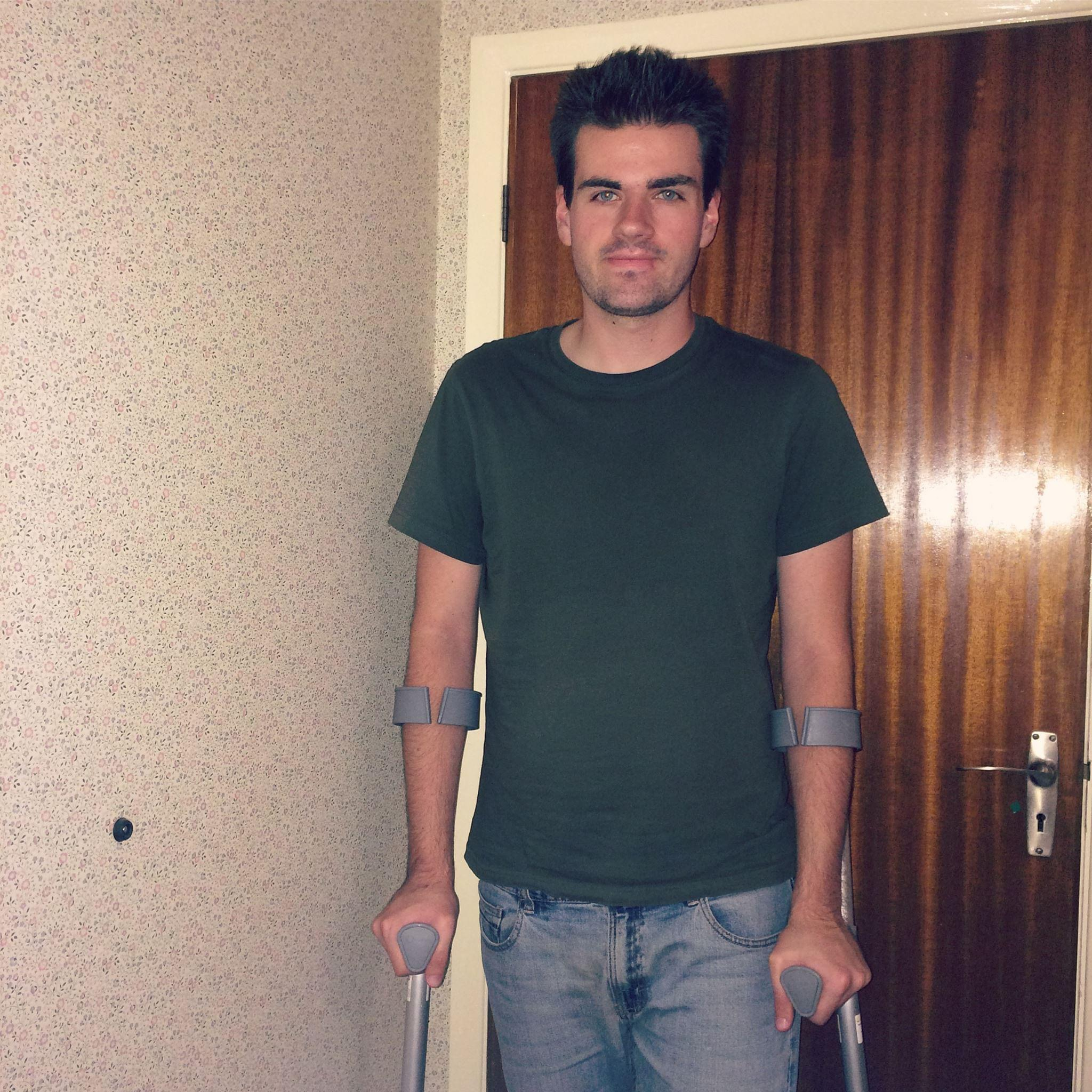
A man using forearm crutches

A crutch is a mobility aid that transfers weight from the legs to the upper body. It is often used by people who cannot use their legs to support their weight, for reasons ranging from short-term injuries to lifelong disabilities.

== History ==
Crutches were used in ancient Egypt. In 1917, Emile Schlick patented the first commercially produced crutch; the design consisted of a walking stick with an upper arm support. Later, A.R. Lofstrand Jr. developed the first crutches with a height-adjustable feature. Over time, the design of crutches has not changed much, and the classic design continues to be the most commonly used.

== Types ==
There are several types of crutches:

=== Underarm or axillary ===
Axillary crutches are used by placing the pad against the ribcage beneath the armpit and holding the grip, which is below and parallel to the pad. They are usually used to provide support for patients who have temporary restriction on ambulation. With underarm crutches, sometimes a towel or some kind of soft cover is needed to prevent or reduce armpit injury. A condition known as crutch paralysis, or crutch palsy can arise from pressure on nerves in the armpit, or axilla. Specifically, "the brachial plexus in the axilla is often damaged from the pressure of a crutch...In these cases the radial is the nerve most frequently implicated; the ulnar nerve suffers next in frequency."

An uncommon type of axillary crutches is the spring-loaded crutch. The underarm pad is a curved design that is open in the front with the grips for the hands shaped for maximum comfort and to reduce the prevalence of overuse injuries. These crutches also contain a spring mechanism at the bottom. The idea behind this design is to allow the user to propel themselves further, resulting in quicker movement from place to place, though research has shown that the difference in speed is very small when comparing standard axillary crutches to spring-loaded crutches.

=== Forearm ===
A typical forearm crutch

A forearm crutch (also commonly known as an elbow crutch, Canadian crutch or "Lofstrand" crutch due to a brand by this name) has a cuff at the top that goes around the forearm. It is used by inserting the arm into the cuff and holding the grip. The hinged cuff, most frequently made of plastic or metal, can be a half-circle or a full circle with a V-type opening in the front allowing the forearm to slip out in case of a fall. They can be both centrally-mass- manufactured or using distributed manufactured with 3D printers from open source plans.

Forearm crutches are the dominant type used in Europe, whether for short or long term use. Outside of Europe forearm crutches are more likely to be used by users with long-term disabilities, with axillary crutches more common for short-term use.

=== Platform ===
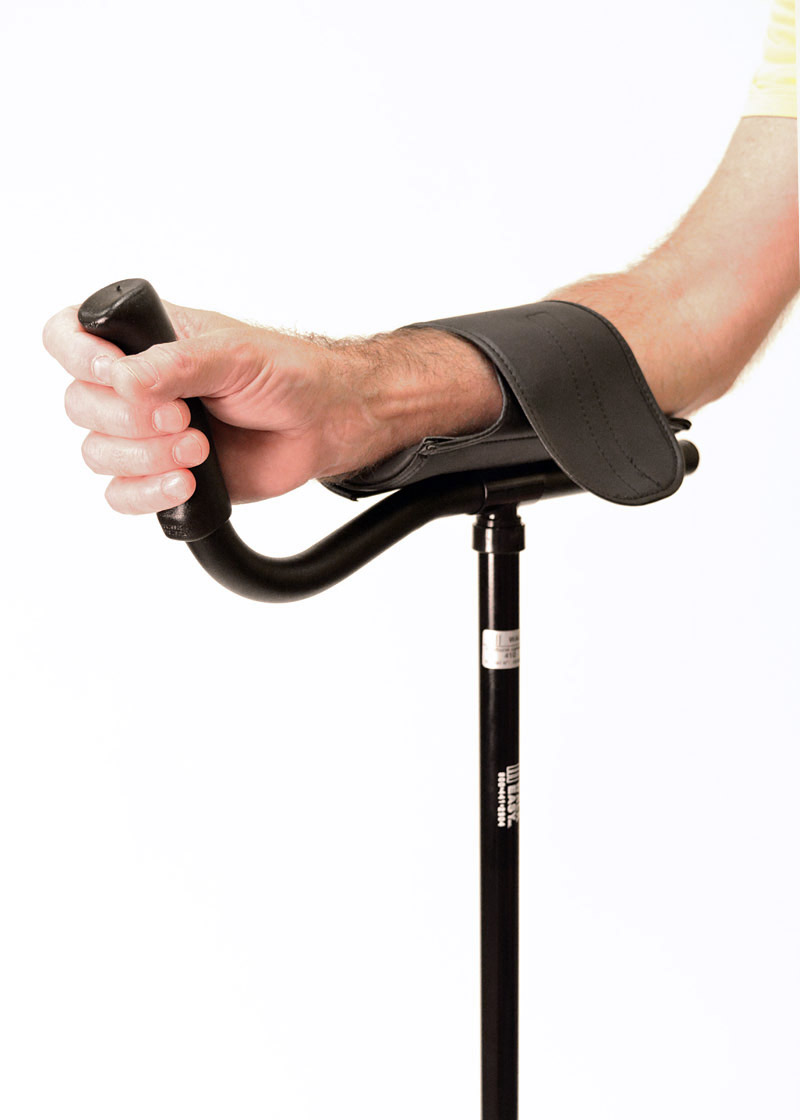
Top portion of a platform crutch showing platform and grip

These are less common and used by those with poor hand or grip strength due to arthritis, cerebral palsy, or other conditions. The forearm rests on a horizontal platform and is usually strapped in place with velcro-type straps that allow the platform or trough to release in case of a fall. The hand holds an angled grip which, in addition, should allow adjustment of length from trough to grip and side-to-side sway depending on the user's disability.

=== Leg support ===
These non-traditional crutches are useful for users with an injury or disability affecting one lower leg only. They function by strapping the affected leg into a support frame that simultaneously holds the lower leg clear of the ground while transferring the load from the ground to the user's knee or thigh. This style of crutch has the advantage of not using the hands or arms while walking. A claimed benefit is that upper thigh atrophy is also reduced because the affected leg remains in use. Unlike other crutch designs these designs are unusable for pelvic, hip or thigh injuries and in some cases for knee injuries also.

Walking sticks or canes serve an identical purpose to crutches, but are held only in the hand and have a limited load bearing capability because of this.

== Types of gaits ==
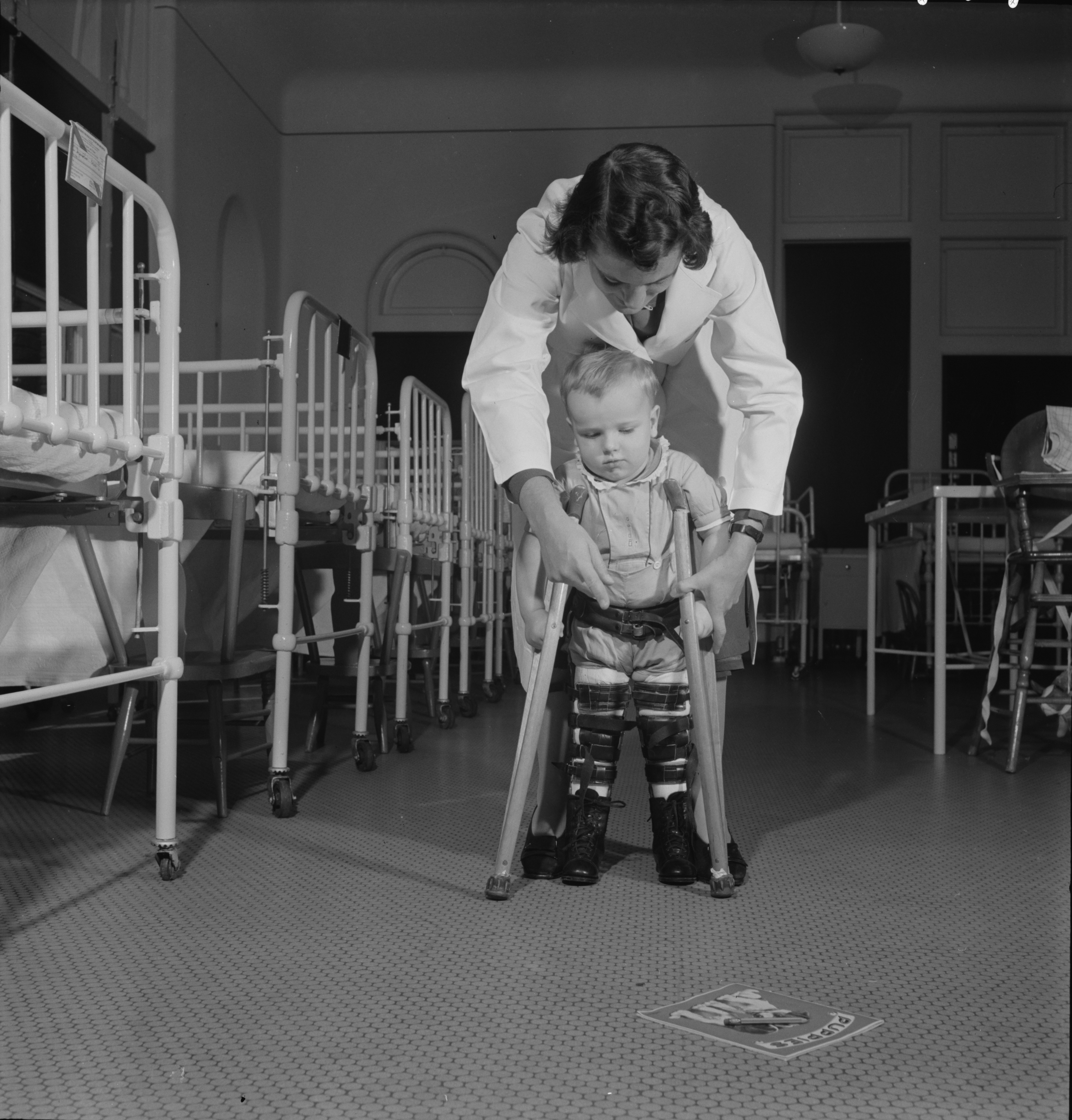
Small boy learns to use his crutches (1942).

=== One crutch ===
When using one crutch, the crutch may be placed on the side of the unaffected leg or used to bear the load of the affected leg.

=== Four-point gait ===
Those who can tolerate partial weight bearing on both legs usually use the four point gait. The sequence is right crutch, left leg, left crutch, right leg. This is the slowest of all gaits but also the safest in that three of the four points are in contact with the ground at any given time.

=== Two-point gait ===
Those who can tolerate partial weight bearing on both legs but require less support than a four-point gait usually use the two-point gait. The sequence is right crutch with left leg and then left crutch with right leg.

=== Three-point gait ===
The three point gait is usually used by those who cannot bear weight on one leg. Both crutches are advanced while bearing weight on the unaffected leg. Then the unaffected leg is advanced while bearing weight on the crutches.

=== Swing-to gait ===
A person with a non-weight bearing injury generally performs a "swing-to" gait: lifting the affected leg, the user places both crutches in front of themself, and then swings their uninjured leg to meet the crutches. A similar "swing-through" gait is when both legs are advanced in front of the crutches rather than beside them.

=== Stairs ===
When climbing up stairs, the unaffected leg is advanced first, then the affected leg and the crutches are advanced. When descending stairs, the crutches are advanced first and then the affected leg and the unaffected leg.

== Alternative devices ==
The knee scooter and the wheelchair are possible alternatives for patients who cannot use or do not like crutches. These wheeled devices introduce an additional limitation, however, since most cannot negotiate stairs.

== Materials ==
- Wood
- Metal alloys (most often steel, aluminium alloys, titanium alloys)
- Carbon or glass fiber reinforced composites
- Thermoplastic
- Carbon-fiber reinforced polymer

== See also ==
- Assistive technology
- Walker
