= Knee scooter =

Ambulation aid

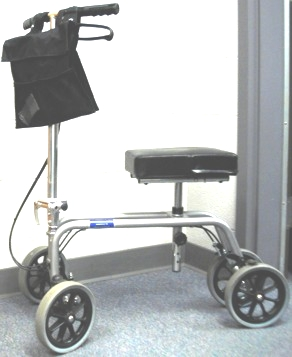
Knee and Leg Walker by Essential Medical Supply. This version has an adjustable cushion and handlebars, with dual handbrakes.

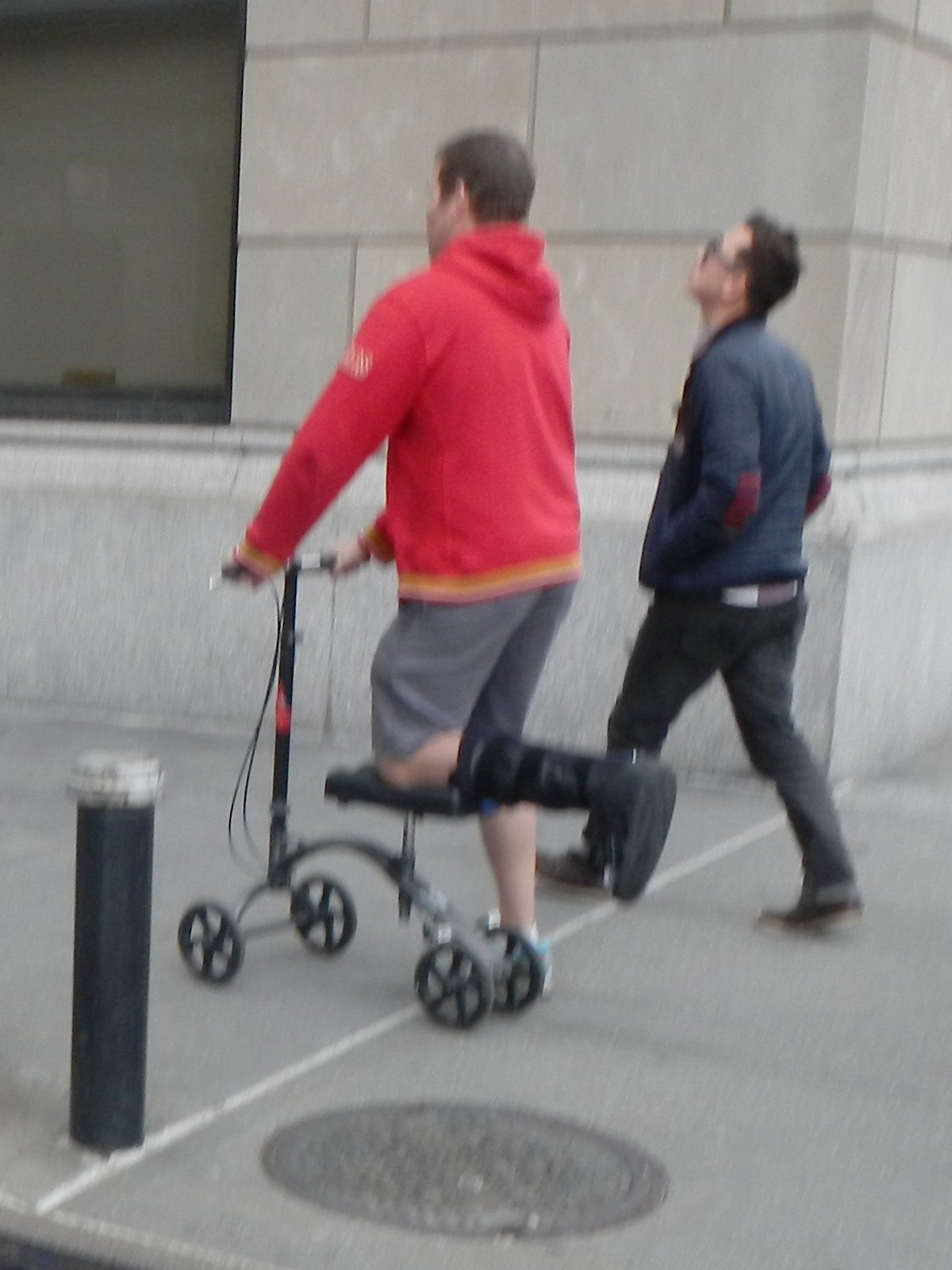
Knee scooter in use

A knee scooter or knee walker is a two-, three- or four-wheeled alternative to crutches or a traditional walker as an ambulation aid. It is known by many other names, including knee coaster, knee cruiser, knee caddy, orthopaedic scooter, or leg walker.

Over the years, it has taken on many forms—from small-wheeled devices suitable for indoor use, to larger, sturdier units capable of use outside on grass or paved surfaces. Today’s version is usually a lightweight, foldable design that, with the knee flexed, supports the shin of the unusable limb. The opposite foot makes contact with the floor or ground, providing propulsion.

== Operation ==
The objective of the scooter is to create a safe, comfortable, and easy-to-maneuver alternative to the traditional crutch. Prior to its introduction, those experiencing foot surgery, bunionectomies, gout, below-the-knee amputations, diabetic ulcers and wounds, as well as foot sprains or fractures, had no choice but to limit activity during rehabilitation. Their only options were crutches, a traditional walker, a wheelchair, or bed rest.

The scooter does have limitations that may make it unsuitable for some patients, including those with leg injuries above or near the knee. It cannot navigate stairs, and is significantly heavier and more difficult to load into a vehicle than crutches.

== Rental ==
As knee scooters are often used while the user recovers after surgery, they are often rented for a short period of time, usually about four weeks. While a Medicare E0118 code may have been present in the past for dealers to provide this to patients/beneficiaries, as changes are made to funding, many dealers have the option of renting these products directly for a short-use period. Due to complexities, costs of renting (if the injury is longer than typical), and possible inconvenience of return, some choose to simply purchase this product instead.

== Research / Clinical evidence section ==
A study published in The Foot examined the physiological energy expenditure associated with the use of a knee scooter compared with crutches and walking frames. The findings indicated that use of a knee scooter was associated with lower energy expenditure than crutches and walking frames, with values closer to those observed during unaided walking.

The study was conducted in collaboration with clinical and academic partners, including the Department of Trauma and Orthopaedics at Torbay Hospital and researchers affiliated with Plymouth University, and explored the potential implications for patient mobility and rehabilitation following lower limb injury or surgery.
