= Elinor Hallé =

British sculptor and inventor (1856–1926)

Elinor Hallé CBE
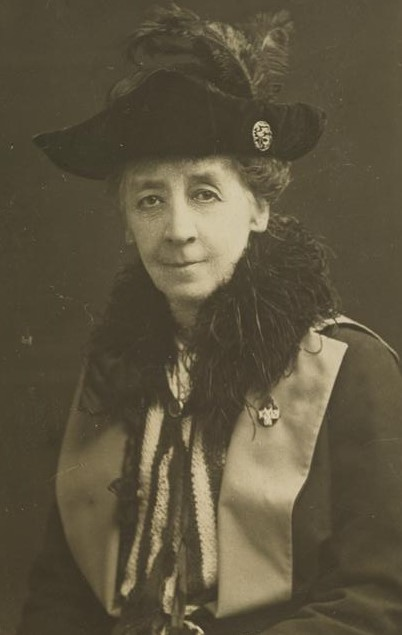
- Born: 1856; Manchester, England
- Died: 18 May 1926 (aged 69–70)
- Occupations: Sculptor; medalist; inventor
- Father: Charles Hallé
- Relatives: Charles Edward Hallé (brother)

Elinor Jessie Marie Hallé CBE (1856 – 18 May 1926) was a British sculptor and inventor. She is known for devising the idea of creating (with Anne Acheson) plaster casts as splints for broken limbs during the First World War, as well as for designing medals.

== Life ==
Halle was born in Manchester in 1856. Her parents were Sir Charles Hallé and his first wife, Marie Desirée Smith. Her father started the Hallé Orchestra. Her Franco-American mother died in 1866 at the family home in Chorlton. Her older brother was the painter Charles Edward Hallé (born c. 1846).

Hallé studied sculpture at the Slade School of Fine Art under Alphonse Legros. She was a member of the group of medallists known as the Slade Girls. Her medal of Cardinal Newman won top prize at the 1885 International Inventions Exhibition.

Hallé did the modelling for a number of important awards and this included the 1890 Royal Geographical Society Medal.

During the First World War Halle volunteered with the Surgical Requisites Association. The association supplied medical dressings and had been created by Queen Mary’s Needlework Guild. Anne Acheson and Halle were both sculptors and they witnessed soldiers returning from the front with broken limbs held together with only wooden splints and basic bandages, it was suggested that taking a plaster cast of the limb. Then when the cast had hardened they could wrap it with papier-mache. It could then be placed on the broken limb whilst the bones knitted. This was inspired by the plaster of Paris in use in their sculptural work. The anatomically correct papier-mache splint reduced the healing time while supporting the broken bone. The idea of using plaster of Paris was adopted and refined over the years and is still in use today by the medical profession.

She was awarded a CBE 3 June 1918, in recognition of her valuable work during the war years.

She died on 18 May 1926 at her residence in Yeoman's Row Kensington.

== Works ==
- Cardinals Manning Medal
- Cardinal Mercier Medal
- Cardinal Newman Medal
- the Royal Geographical Society Emin Pasha Relief Expedition Medal, 1890
- A medal for her father.
- She made the collar for the Royal Victorian Order
- the insignia of the Order of the British Empire and the order of the Companions of Honour.
