= Anne Acheson =

Irish sculptor (1882–1962)

Anne Acheson CBE FRBC
- Anne Crawford Acheson
- Born: 5 August 1882; Portadown, County Armagh, Ireland (now Northern Ireland)
- Died: 13 March 1962 (aged 79); Lisburn, Northern Ireland, United Kingdom
- Education: Victoria College, Belfast, Belfast School of Art, Royal College of Art
- Known for: Medical plaster and Sculpture

Anne Crawford Acheson CBE FRBC (5 August 1882 – 13 March 1962) was a British-Irish sculptor. She and Elinor Hallé invented plaster casts for soldier's broken limbs. Acheson exhibited at the Royal Academy and internationally. She was awarded the CBE in 1919. During the First World War she worked for the Surgical Requisites Association at Mulberry Walk in Chelsea, London. Acheson received the Gleichen Memorial Award in 1938. She divided her time between London and Glenavy, County Antrim, Northern Ireland.

== Career ==
Acheson was born at Portadown in County Armagh to John Acheson, a manufacturer, and his wife, Harriet Glasgow. The Achesons lived at 51 Carrickblacker Rd, Portadown, Co Armagh. Anne Acheson was educated at Victoria College, Belfast, the Belfast School of Art and the Royal College of Art in London where she studied sculpture under Édouard Lantéri.

Acheson first exhibited at the Royal Academy in 1913, when her sculpture The Pixie was accepted. Over the next four decades, 30 of her sculptures were featured in 22 exhibitions at the Academy. Acheson's work included statuettes, portrait heads, and garden figurines. While her early works were sculpted from wood, her later sculptures were largely done in metal, stone or concrete.

=== Wartime services ===
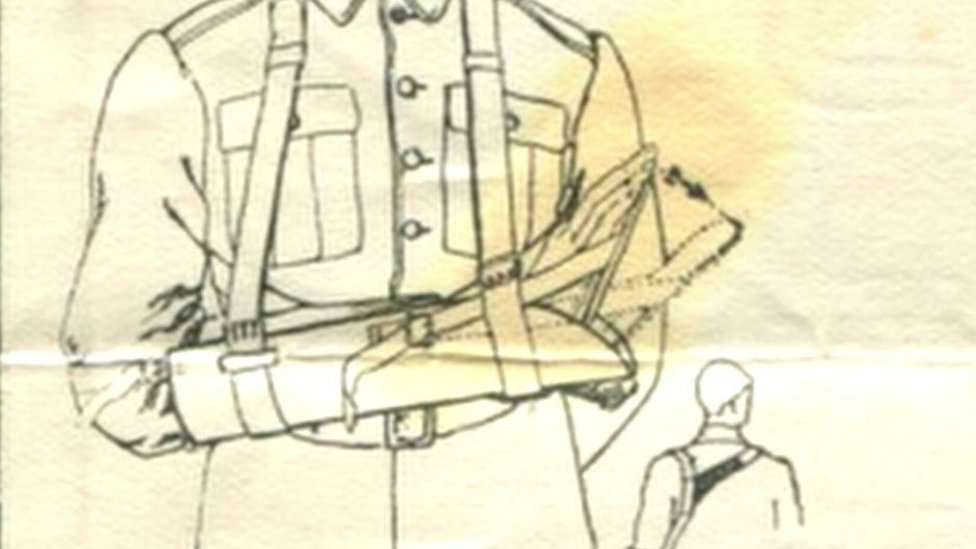
Acheson's initial designs were tricky.

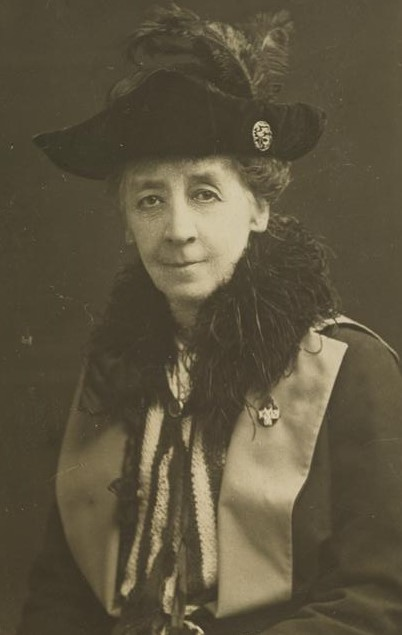
Elinor Hallé CBE was also involved in the invention.

During the First World War she volunteered with the Surgical Requisites Association, which supplied medical dressings and had been created by Queen Mary's Needlework Guild. Acheson and Elinor Hallé were both sculptors and they witnessed soldiers returning from the front with broken limbs held together with only wooden splints and basic bandages, Acheson suggested taking a plaster cast of the limb and when the cast had hardened, wrapping papier mâché over it, and placing it over the broken limb to support it whilst healing. This was inspired by the plaster of Paris she used in her sculptural work. The anatomically correct papier mâché splint reduced the healing time while properly supporting the broken limb. The idea of using plaster of Paris was adopted and refined over the years and is still in use today by the medical profession. When she completed her studies, Acheson taught at a school in London and continued to live in that city.

She was the first woman, in 1938, to be elected a fellow of the Royal British Society of Sculptors.

Acheson retrained as a precision engineer and draftswoman during the Second World War to enable her to carry out further voluntary work. She also worked for the Red Cross during the conflict.

After the war Acheson continued as an artist practicing in Northern Ireland.

== Commemoration ==
A blue plaque commemorating her achievements was unveiled at First Presbyterian Church (Portadown, Ireland) on 27 September 2018 by her great nephew, Rev John Glasgow Faris.

An exhibition, Anne Acheson: A Sculptor in War and Peace, was held at Millennium Court Arts Centre in Portadown during April and May in 2019.

== Works ==
Dates for works refer to when they were first exhibited.

- The Pixie (1910)
- The Leprechaun (1914)
- Echo Mocking (1914)
- Sally (circa 1923)
- The Imp (1924)
- Trio (1924 presumed)
- Lead Mask for Garden Decoration (1924 presumed)
- The Gossamer Thread (1924 presumed)
- Tangle (Pewter Statuette) (1926)
- Mischief (1927)
- Flora M'Flimsy (1927)
- Gertrude Bell (bust for Gertrude Bell Memorial) (circa 1926–1929)
- Harriet Emily (Lead Garden Figure) (1930)
- Harriet Glasgow Acheson, Bronze Medallion (1934)
- Barbara (Glazed Pottery) (1936)
- Saint Brigit (Glazed Pottery) (1936)
- Mother and Child (Glazed Pottery) (1936)
- Harriet Emily (1938)
- Fountain figure (circa 1944)
- The Sacred Bull (1948)
- Virginia (1949)
- Squirrel (1950, presumed)
- River Nymph (Walnut Wood) (1950)
