= Louis-Joseph Seutin =

Belgian doctor, surgeon and professor

Louis Joseph Seutin
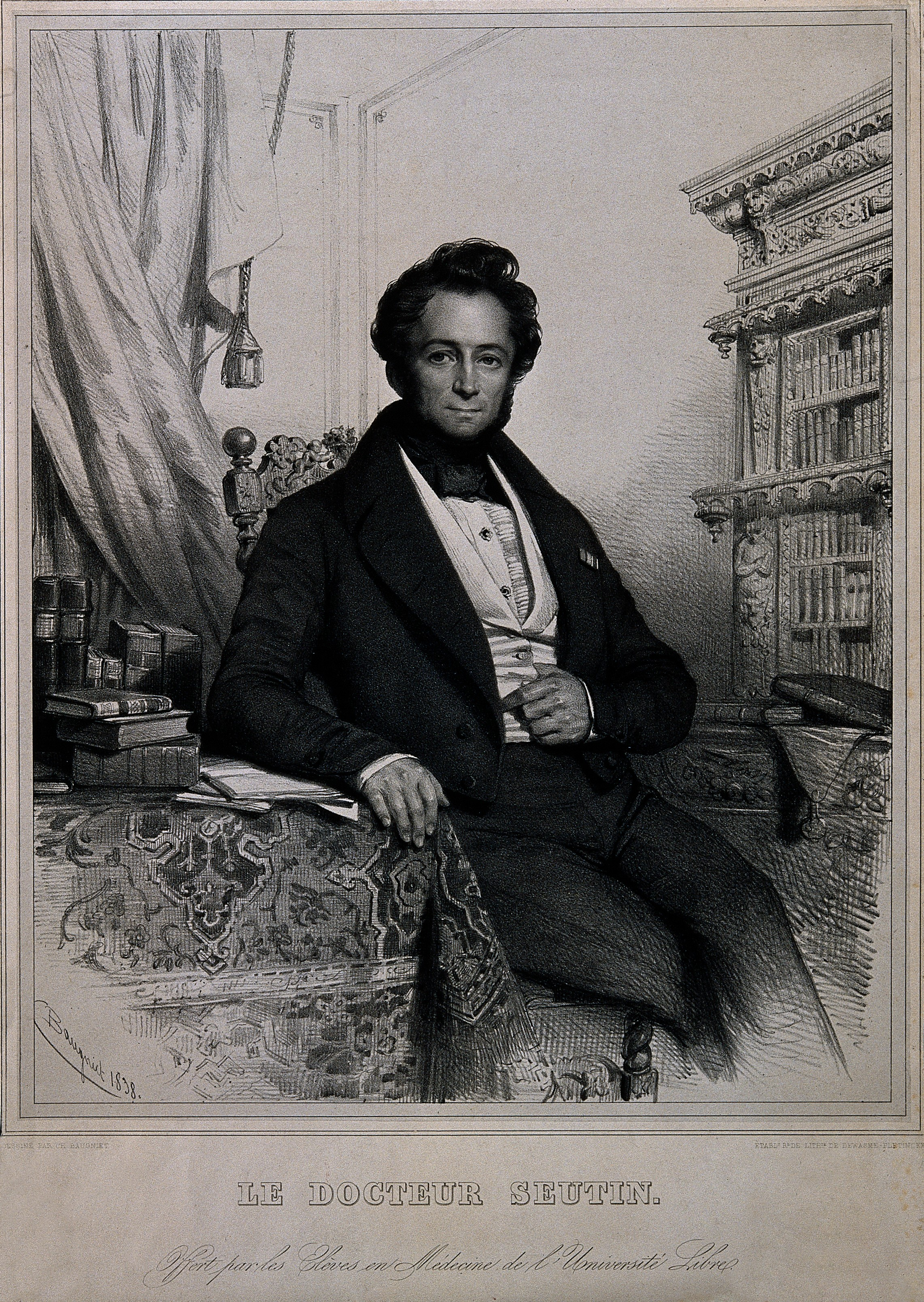
- Seutin in 1838
- Born: Louis Joseph Ghislain Seutin; 18 October 1793; Nivelles, Austrian Netherlands
- Died: 29 January 1862 (aged 68); Brussels, Belgium
- Occupations: Politician, physician, surgeon, professor

Louis Joseph Seutin (18 October 1793 – 29 January 1862) was a Belgian medical doctor, surgeon and professor at the Université libre de Bruxelles.

== Biography ==
Louis Joseph Ghislain Seutin was born in Nivelles. He studied medicine and took part in the Battle of Waterloo as a doctor. After the Belgian Revolution in 1830, he became the personal doctor of King Leopold I and Head Doctor of the Belgian army. He was later made a baron for his services.

He became Head Surgeon of St. Peter's Hospital and a professor of surgery in 1834.

He invented the use of starched bandages. Seutin had travelled through Russia demonstrating his starched bandage, and his technique had been adopted by both the Russian army and navy by 1837. And, in 1848, was the first to use chloroform for anaesthesia. His treatment of open fractures was revolutionary. By improving hygiene, he also drastically reduced the number of women who died in childbirth.

He became a senator for the Liberal Party in 1853.

Seutin died in Brussels on 29 January 1862, and is buried in Laeken Cemetery.

== Major works ==
- Du bandage amidonné ou, recueil de toutes les pièces composées sur ce bandage depuis son invention jusqu'a ce jour. Brussels: J.B.Tircher, 362 p., 1840.
- Traité de la méthode amovo-inamovible, comprenant des recherches historiques sur l'origine et la constitution de cette méthode; l'exposé de ses principes, de ses caractères et de ses procédés; et ses applications cliniques aux divers ordres de lésions et maladies chirurgicales (347 p. ill., 1851).

== In popular culture ==
See the Belgian film by Jean-Marie Piquint A Hauteur d'Homme ("Man among men") with Jacques Lippe.

== Sources ==
- Louis-Joseph Seutin
- De Paepe, Jean-Luc, Raindorf-Gérard, Christiane (ed.), Le Parlement Belge 1831–1894. Données Biographiques, Brussels, Académie Royale de Belgique, 1996, p. 506–507.
- Douxchamps, José, Présence nobiliaire au parlement belge (1830–1970), Notes généalogiques, Wépion-Namur, José Douxchamps, 2003, p. 119–120.
