= Emergency medical services =

Services providing acute medical care

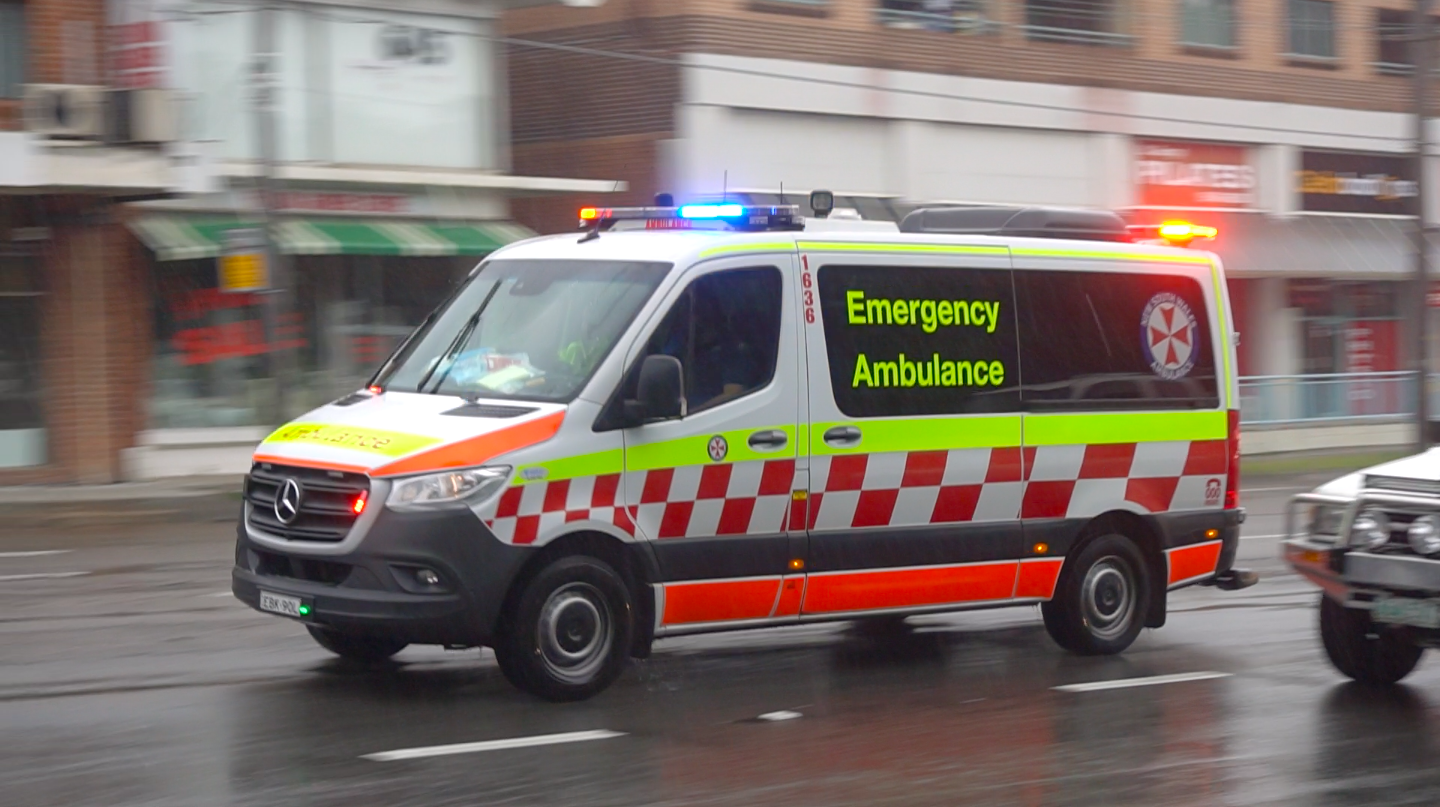
A New South Wales Ambulance emergency medical services unit responding to a call for service

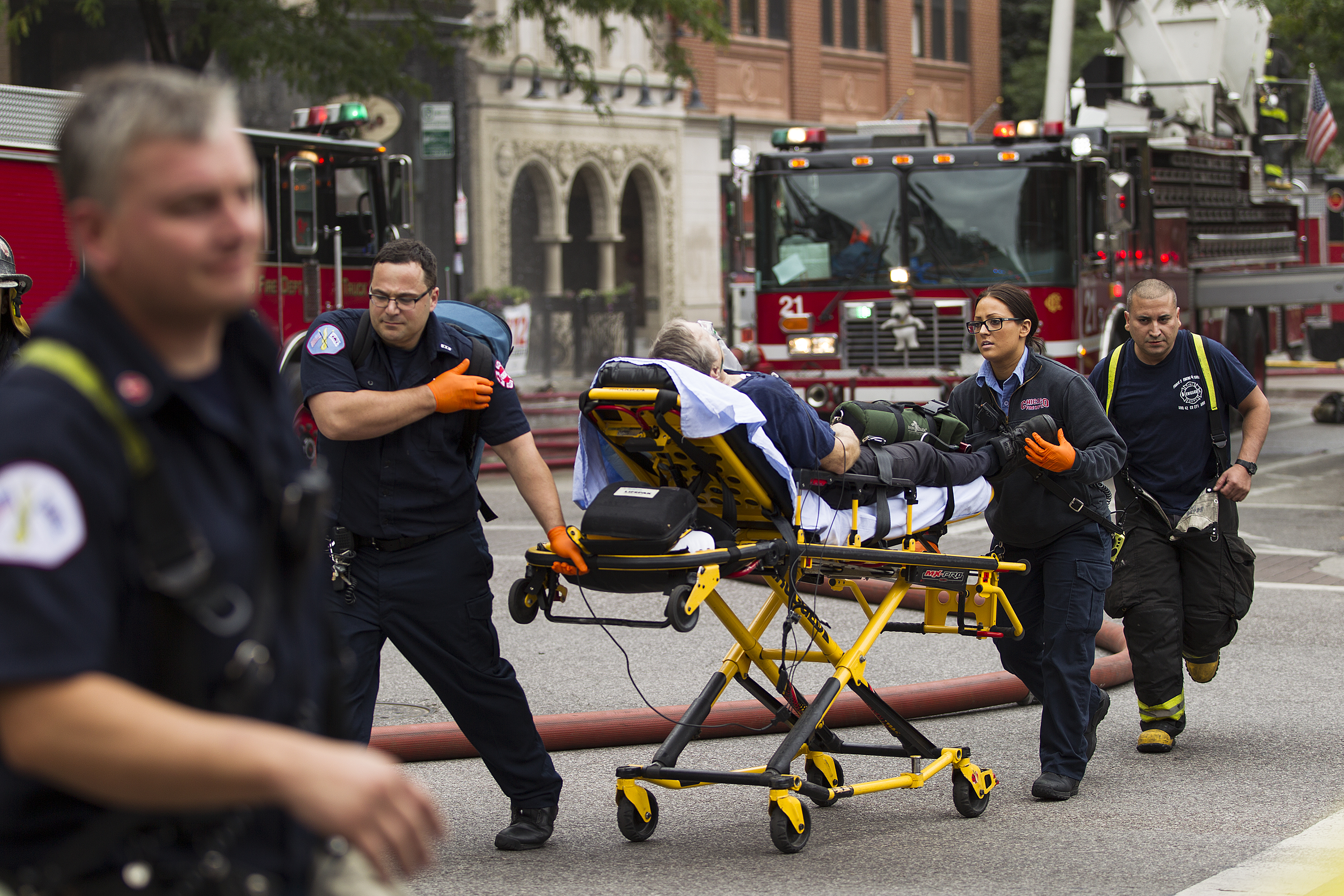
Chicago Fire Department paramedics transporting a patient on a stretcher

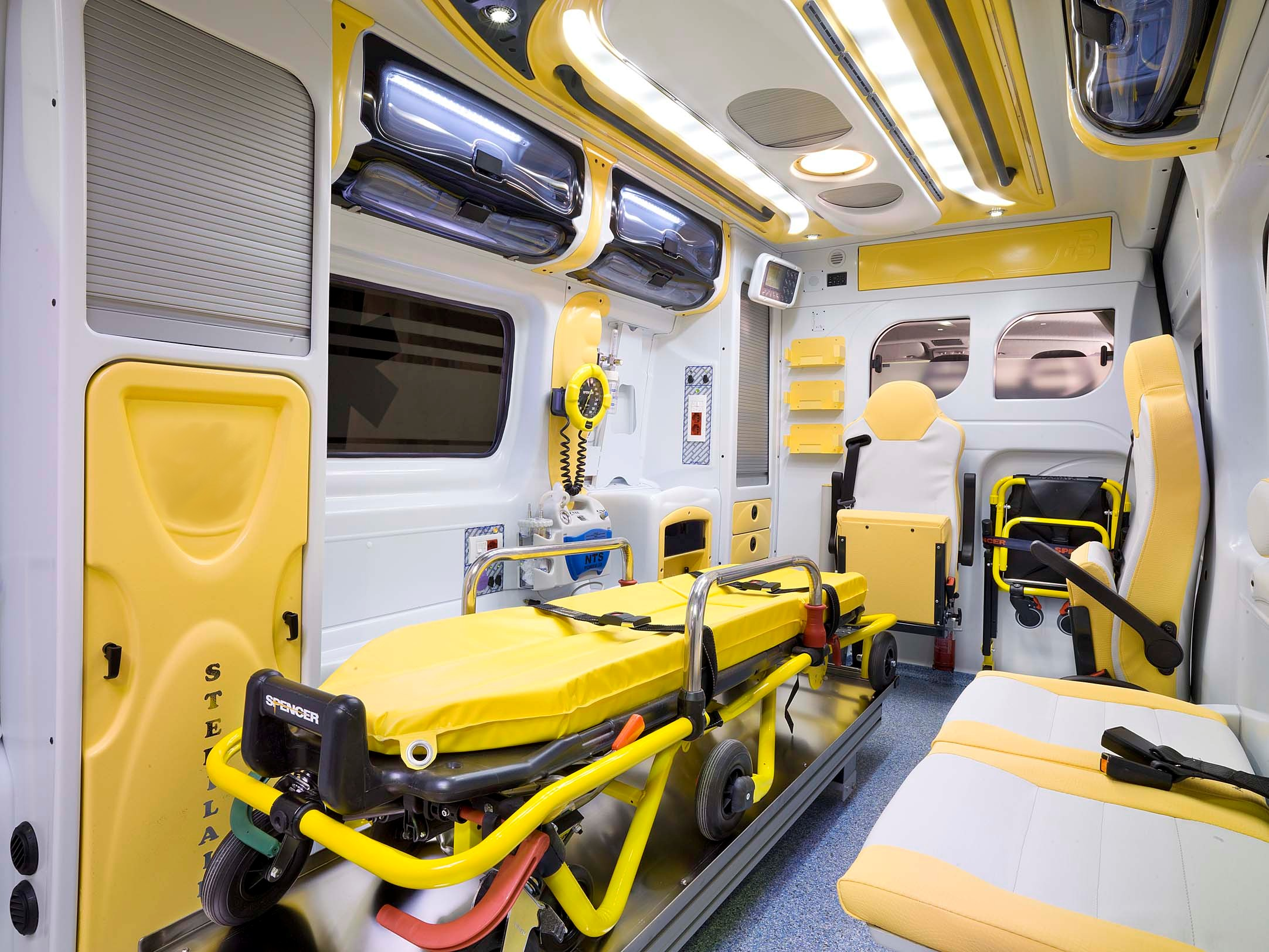
Typical interior view of an Italian ambulance

Emergency medical services (EMS), also known as ambulance services, pre-hospital care, or paramedic services, are emergency services that provide urgent pre-hospital treatment and stabilisation for serious illness and injuries and transport to definitive care. They may also be known as a first aid squad, FAST squad, emergency squad, ambulance squad, ambulance corps, life squad or by other initialisms such as EMAS or EMARS.

In most places, EMS can be summoned by members of the public (as well as medical facilities, other emergency services, businesses and authorities) via an emergency telephone number which puts them in contact with a dispatching centre, which will then dispatch suitable resources for the call. Ambulances are the primary vehicles for delivering EMS, though squad cars, motorcycles, aircraft, boats, fire apparatus, and others may be used. EMS agencies may also operate a non-emergency patient transport service, and some have rescue squads to provide technical rescue or search and rescue services.

When EMS is dispatched, they will initiate medical care upon arrival on scene. If it is deemed necessary or a patient requests transport, the unit is then tasked with transferring the patient to the next point of care, typically an emergency department of a hospital. Historically, ambulances only transported patients to care, and this remains the case in parts of the developing world. The term "emergency medical service" was popularised when these services began to emphasise emergency treatment at the scene. In some countries, a substantial portion of EMS calls do not result in a patient being taken to hospital.

Training and qualification levels for members and employees of emergency medical services vary widely throughout the world. In some systems, members may be present who are qualified only to drive ambulances, with no medical training. In contrast, most systems have personnel who retain at least basic life support (BLS) certifications. In English-speaking countries, they are known as emergency medical technicians (EMTs) and paramedics, with the latter having additional training such as advanced life support (ALS) skills.

Physicians and nurses may also provide pre-hospital care to varying degrees in certain countries, a model which is popular in Europe.

== History ==
=== Precursors ===
Emergency care in the field has been rendered in different forms since the beginning of recorded history. The New Testament contains the parable of the Good Samaritan, in which a man who has been beaten is cared for by a passing Samaritan. Luke 10:34 (NIV) – "He went to him and bandaged his wounds, pouring on oil and wine. Then he put the man on his own donkey, took him to an inn and took care of him." During the Middle Ages, the Knights Hospitaller were known for rendering assistance to wounded soldiers in the battlefield.

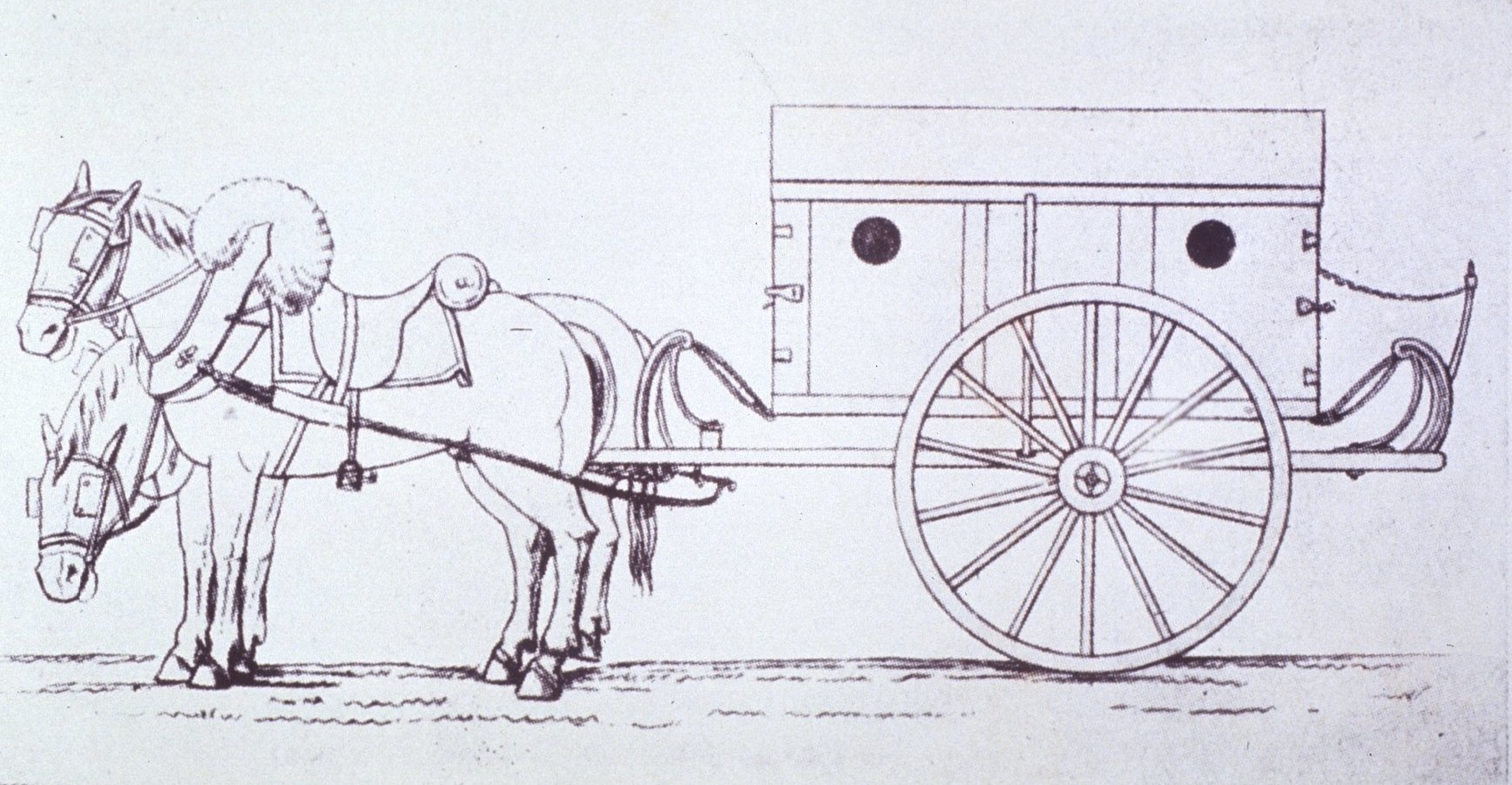
A drawing of one of Larrey's ambulances volantes

The first use of the ambulance as a specialized vehicle in battle came about with the ambulances volantes designed by Dominique Jean Larrey (1766–1842), Napoleon Bonaparte's chief surgeon. Larrey was present at the battle of Spires, between the French and Prussians, and was distressed by the fact that wounded soldiers were not picked up by the numerous ambulances (which Napoleon required to be stationed two and half miles back from the scene of battle) until after hostilities had ceased, and set about developing a new ambulance system. Having decided against using the Norman system of horse litters, he settled on two- or four-wheeled horse-drawn wagons, which were used to transport fallen soldiers from the (active) battlefield after they had received early treatment in the field. Larrey's projects for 'flying ambulances' were first approved by the Committee of Public Safety in 1794. Larrey subsequently entered Napoleon's service during the Italian campaigns in 1796, where his ambulances were used for the first time at Udine, Padua and Milan, and he adapted his ambulances to the conditions, even developing a litter which could be carried by a camel for a campaign in Egypt.

=== Early civilian ambulances ===
A major advance was made (which in future years would come to shape policy on hospitals and ambulances) with the introduction of a transport carriage for cholera patients in London during 1832. The statement on the carriage, as printed in The Times, said "The curative process commences the instant the patient is put in to the carriage; time is saved which can be given to the care of the patient; the patient may be driven to the hospital so speedily that the hospitals may be less numerous and located at greater distances from each other". This tenet of ambulances providing instant care, allowing hospitals to be spaced further apart, displays itself in modern emergency medical planning.

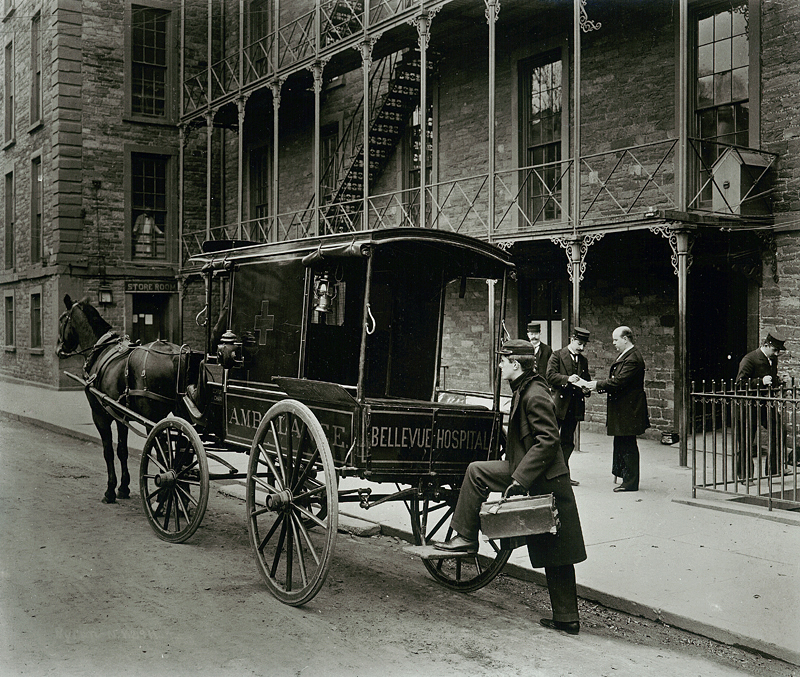
A horse-drawn Bellevue Hospital ambulance in New York City, 1895

The first known hospital-based ambulance service operated out of Commercial Hospital, Cincinnati, Ohio (now the Cincinnati General) by 1865. This was soon followed by other services, notably the New York service provided out of Bellevue Hospital which started in 1869 with ambulances carrying medical equipment, such as splints, a stomach pump, morphine, and brandy, reflecting contemporary medicine.

Another early ambulance service was founded by Jaromir V. Mundy, Count J. N. Wilczek, and Eduard Lamezan-Salins in Vienna after the disastrous fire at the Vienna Ringtheater in 1881. Named the "Vienna Voluntary Rescue Society", it served as a model for similar societies worldwide.

In June 1887 the St John Ambulance Brigade was established to provide first aid and ambulance services at public events in London. It was modelled on a military-style command and discipline structure.

On 6 June 1891, the first ambulance station in Poland and the second in Europe was established in Kraków, modeled on similar services in Vienna. Founded by local physicians and fire officials, it initially operated horse-drawn ambulances before later adopting motor vehicles.

=== Motorization ===
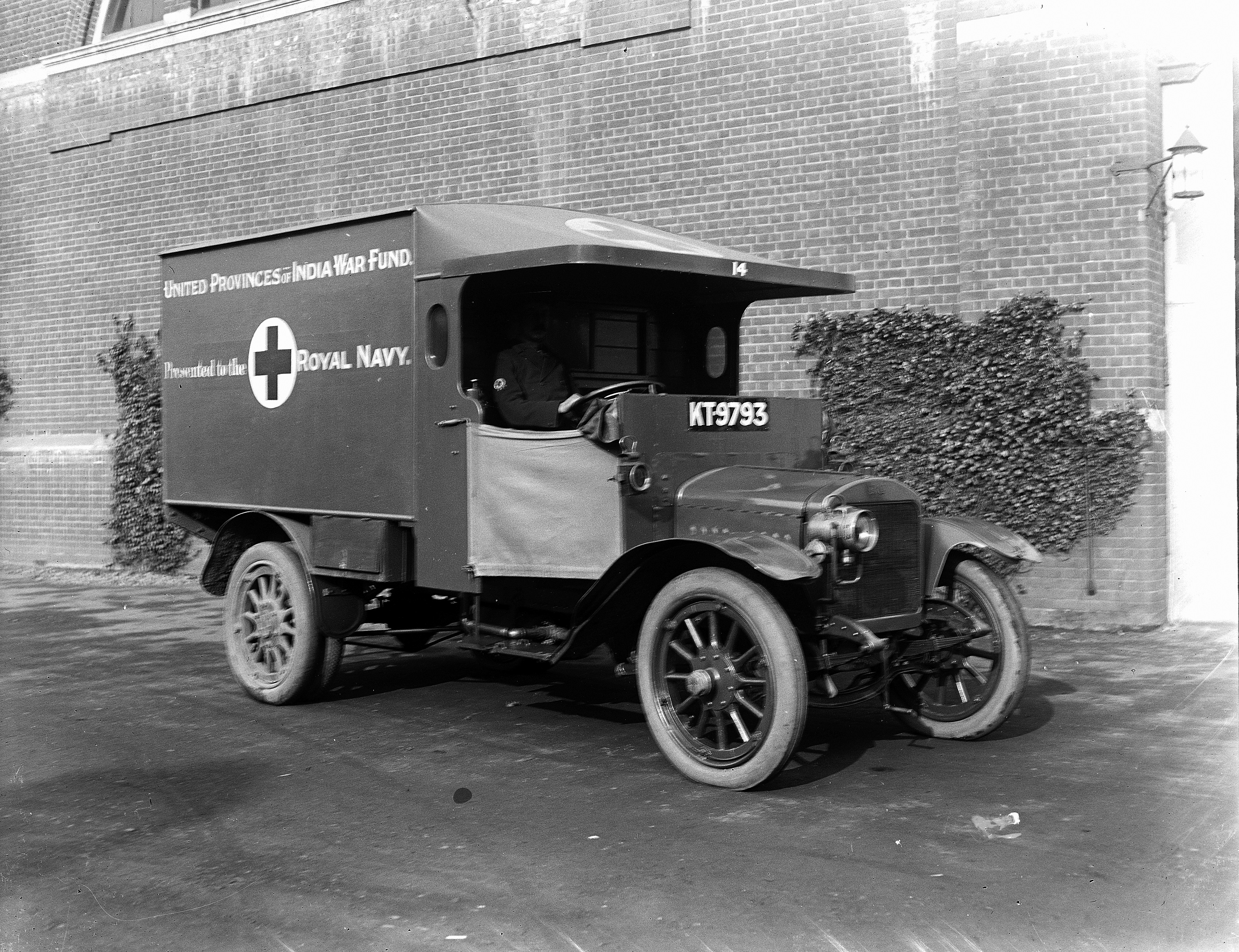
A Royal Navy ambulance during World War I

Also in the late 19th century, the automobile was being developed, and in addition to horse-drawn models, early 20th century ambulances were powered by steam, gasoline, and electricity, reflecting the competing automotive technologies then in existence. However, the first motorized ambulance was brought into service in the last year of the 19th century, with the Michael Reese Hospital, Chicago, taking delivery of the first automobile ambulance, donated by 500 prominent local businessmen, in February 1899. This was followed in 1900 by New York City, who extolled its virtues of greater speed, more safety for the patient, faster stopping and a smoother ride. These first two automobile ambulances were electrically powered with 2 hp motors on the rear axle.

During World War I, further advances were made in providing care before and during transport; traction splints were introduced during the war and were found to have a positive effect on the morbidity and mortality of patients with leg fractures. Two-way radios became available shortly after World War I, enabling for more efficient radio dispatch of ambulances in some areas. Prior to World War II, there were some areas where a modern ambulance carried advanced medical equipment, was staffed by a physician, and was dispatched by radio. In many locations, however, ambulances were hearses, the only available vehicle that could carry a recumbent patient, and were thus frequently run by funeral homes. These vehicles, which could serve either purpose, were known as combination cars.

Prior to World War II, hospitals provided ambulance service in many large cities. With the severe manpower shortages imposed by the war effort, it became difficult for many hospitals to maintain their ambulance operations. City governments in many cases turned ambulance services over to the police or fire department. No laws required minimal training for ambulance personnel and no training programs existed beyond basic first aid. In many fire departments, assignment to ambulance duty became an unofficial form of punishment.

=== Rise of modern EMS ===
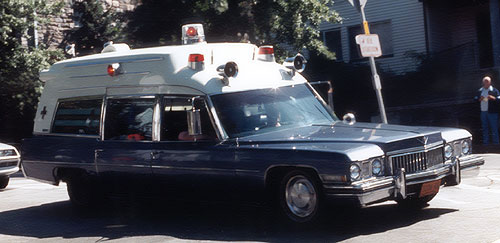
A 1973 Cadillac Miller-Meteor ambulance. Note the raised roof, with more room for the attendants and patients.

Advances in the 1960s, especially the development of CPR and defibrillation as the standard form of care for out-of-hospital cardiac arrest, along with new pharmaceuticals, led to changes in the tasks of the ambulances. In Belfast, Northern Ireland the first experimental mobile coronary care ambulance successfully resuscitated patients using these technologies. Freedom House Ambulance Service was the first civilian emergency medical service in the United States to be staffed by paramedics, all of whom were African-American.

One well-known report in the US during that time was Accidental Death and Disability: The Neglected Disease of Modern Society, also known as The White Paper. The report concluded that ambulance services in the US varied widely in quality and were often unregulated and unsatisfactory. These studies placed pressure on governments to improve emergency care in general, including the care provided by ambulance services. The government reports resulted in the creation of standards in ambulance construction concerning the internal height of the patient care area (to allow for an attendant to continue to care for the patient during transport), and the equipment (and thus weight) that an ambulance had to carry, and several other factors.

In 1971 a progress report was published at the annual meeting, by the then president of American Association of Trauma, Sawnie R. Gaston M.D. Dr. Gaston reported the study was a "superb white paper" that "jolted and wakened the entire structure of organized medicine". This report is created as a "prime mover" and made the "single greatest contribution of its kind to the improvement of emergency medical services". Since this time a concerted effort has been undertaken to improve emergency medical care in the pre-hospital setting. Such advancements included Dr. R Adams Cowley creating the country's first statewide EMS program, in Maryland.

The developments were paralleled in other countries. In the United Kingdom, a 1973 law merged the municipal ambulance services into larger agencies and set national standards. In France, the first official SAMU agencies were founded in the 1970s.

== Organization ==
Depending on country, area within country, or clinical need, emergency medical services may be provided by one or more different types of organization. This variation may lead to large differences in levels of care and expected scope of practice. Some countries closely regulate the industry (and may require anyone working on an ambulance to be qualified to a set level), whereas others allow quite wide differences between types of operator.

=== Municipal "third service" ambulance service ===
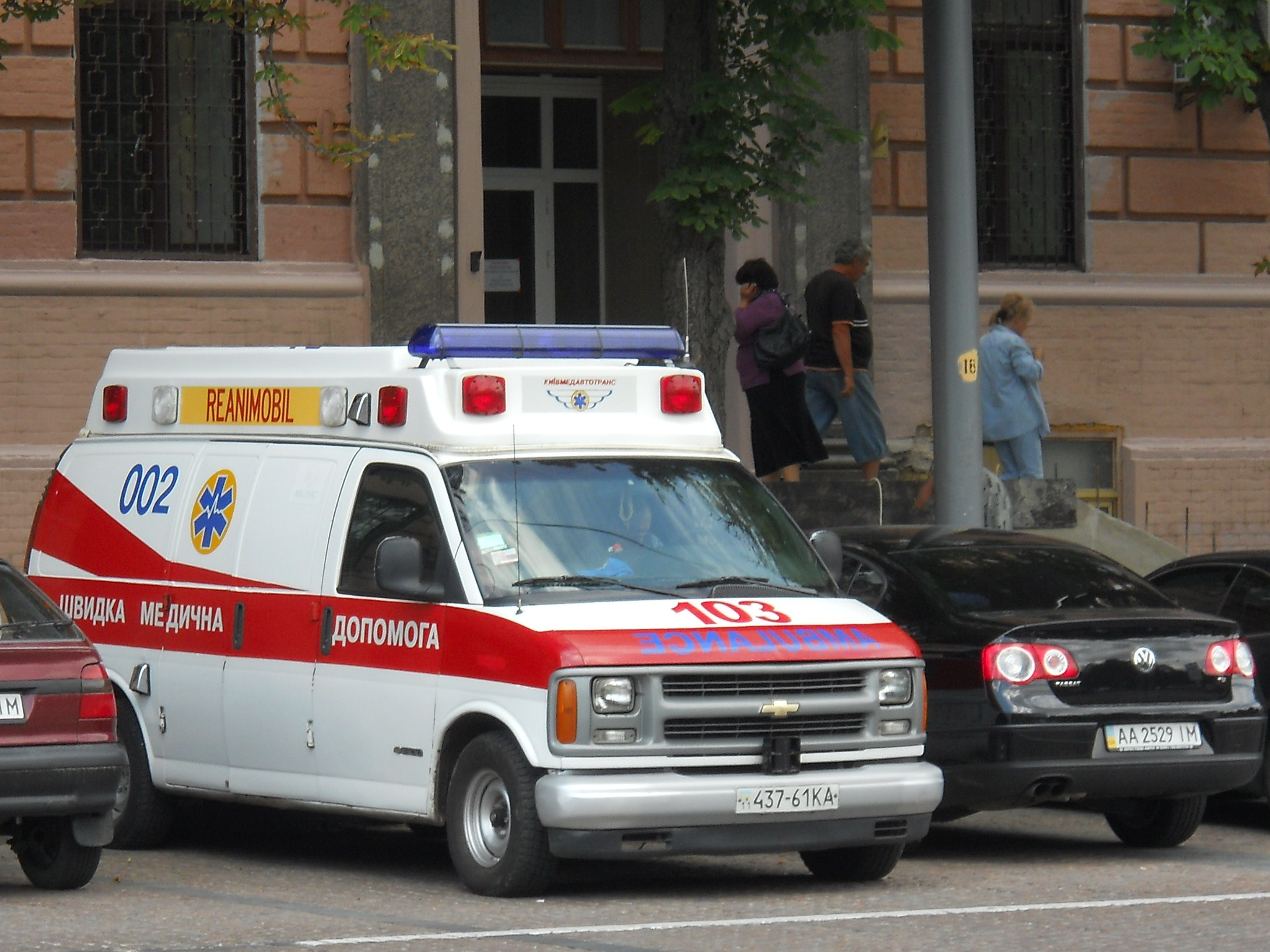
A government-owned ambulance in Kyiv, Ukraine

Operating separately from (although alongside) the fire and police services of the area, these ambulances are funded by local, provincial or national governments. In some countries, these only tend to be found in big cities, whereas in countries such as the United Kingdom, almost all emergency ambulances are part of a national health system.

In the United States, ambulance services provided by a local government are often referred to as "third service" EMS (the fire department, police department, and EMS department forming an emergency services trio) by the members of said service, as well as other city officials and residents. The most notable examples of this model in the United States are Pittsburgh Bureau of Emergency Medical Services, Boston EMS, New Orleans Emergency Medical Services, and Cleveland EMS. Government ambulance services also have to take civil service exams just like government fire departments and police. In the United States, certain federal government agencies employ emergency medical technicians at the basic and advanced life support levels, such as the National Park Service and the Federal Bureau of Prisons.

=== Fire- or police-linked service ===
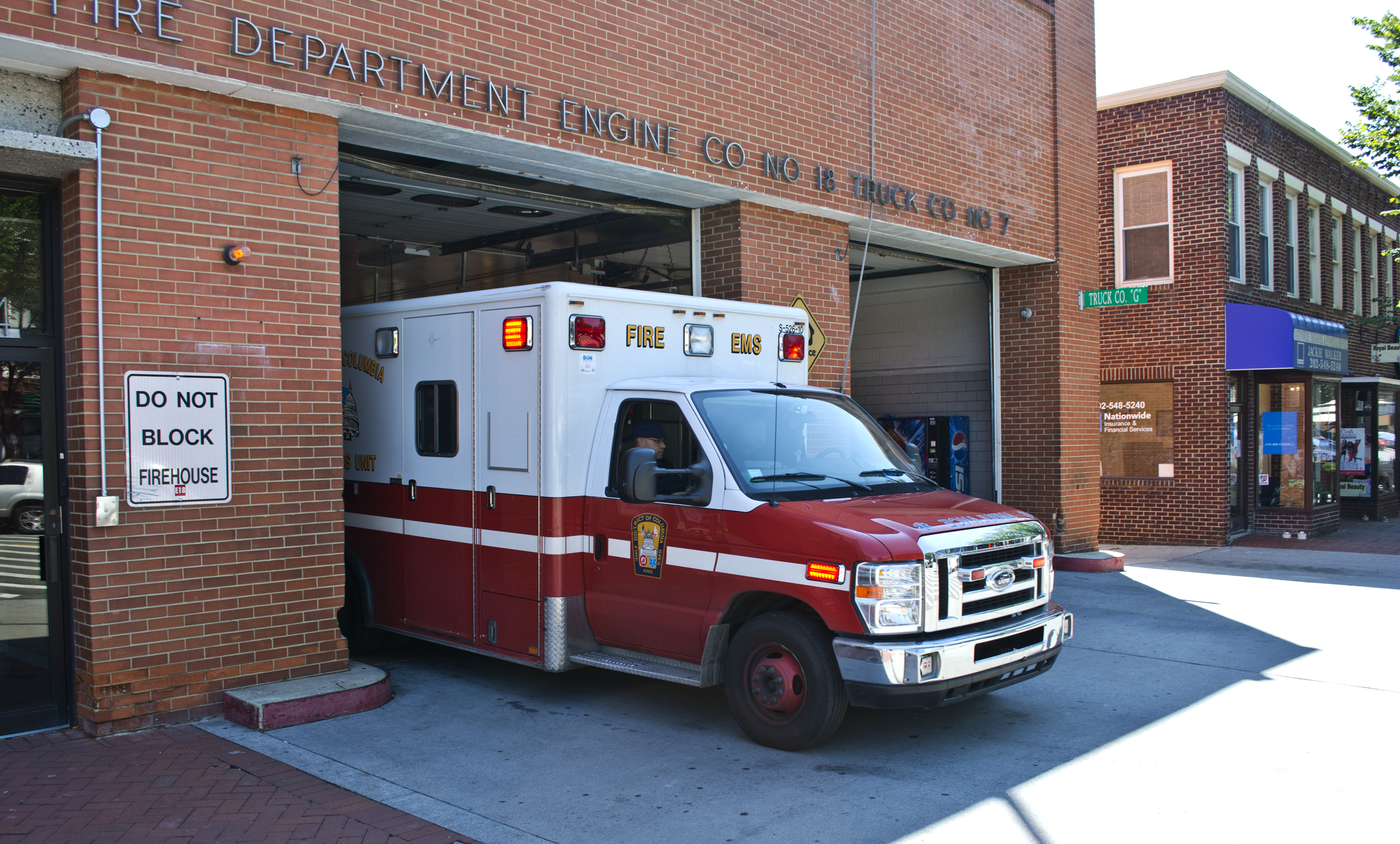
An ambulance of the District of Columbia Fire and Emergency Medical Services Department leaving a fire station

In countries such as the United States, Japan, France, South Korea and parts of India, ambulances can be operated by the local fire or police services. Fire-based EMS is the most common model in the United States, where nearly all urban fire departments provide EMS and a majority of emergency transport ambulance services in large cities are part of fire departments. Examples of this model are the New York City Fire Department (FDNY) and the Baltimore City Fire Department.

It is rare for a police department in the United States to provide EMS or ambulance services, although many police officers have basic medical training (such as Nalaxone use and CPR). One notable example is New Orleans Emergency Medical Services, which was formed as a hospital-based service, was operated by the New Orleans Police Department from 1947 to 1985, and is currently operated by the New Orleans Health Department and the New Orleans Office of Homeland Security and Emergency Preparedness, separate from the New Orleans Fire Department.

=== Charity/not-for-profit ambulance service ===
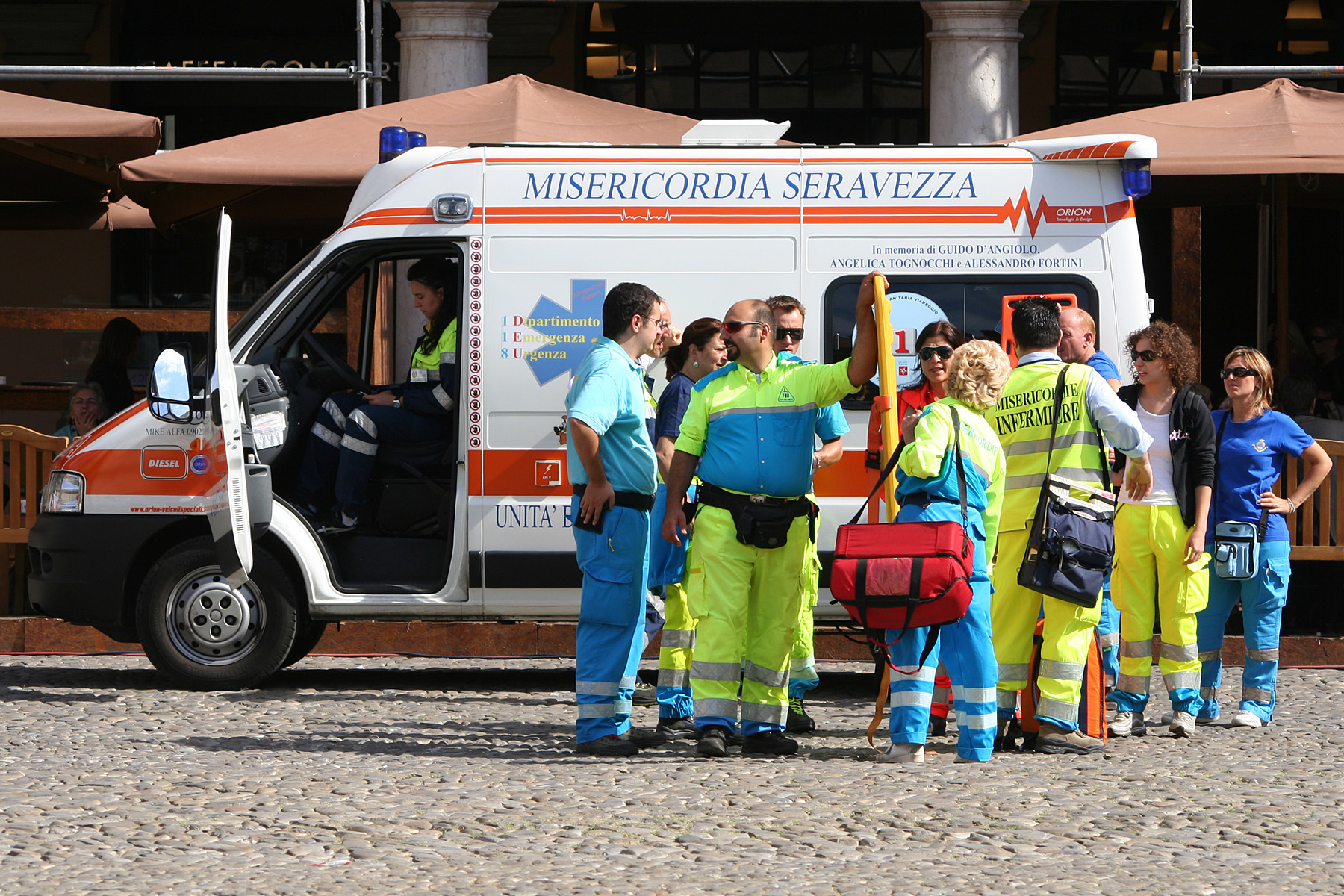
A volunteer ambulance crew in Modena, Italy

Charities or non-profit ambulance departments operate some emergency medical services. They are primarily staffed by volunteers, though many also have paid personnel. These may be linked to a volunteer fire service, and some volunteers may provide both services. Some ambulance charities specialize in providing cover at public gatherings and events (e.g. sporting events), while others provide care to the wider community.

The International Red Cross and Red Crescent Movement is the largest charity in the world that provides emergency medicine. (in some countries, it operates as a private ambulance service). Other organisations include St John Ambulance, the Order of Malta Ambulance Corps and Hatzalah, as well as small local volunteer/paid departments. In the United States, volunteer ambulances are rarer, but can still be seen in both metropolitan and rural areas (e.g. Hatzalah). Charities such as BASICS Scotland, specialise in facilitating training medical professionals to volunteer to assist the statutory ambulance services in the care of patients, through their attendance at those with serious illnesses or injuries.

A few charities provide ambulances for taking patients on trips or vacations away from hospitals, hospices or care homes where they are in long-term care. Examples include the UK's Jumbulance project.

=== Private/corporate ambulance service ===
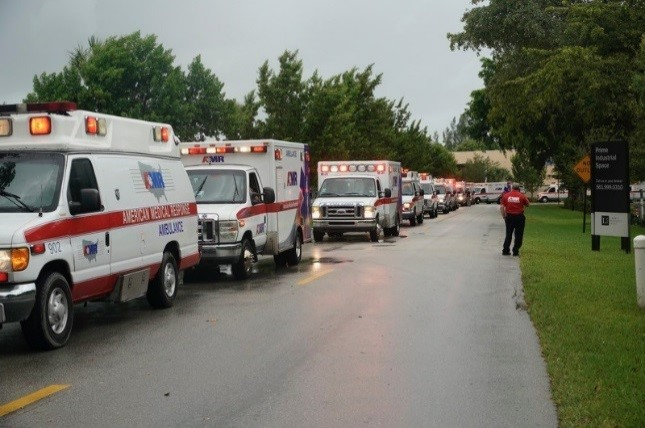
American Medical Response ambulances staging in Tallahassee, Florida during Hurricane Irma

Some ambulances are operated by commercial companies with paid employees, usually on a contract to the local or national government, Hospital Networks, Health Care Facilities and Insurance Companies.

In the U.S., private ambulance companies provide emergency medical services in large cities and rural areas by contracting with local governments. In areas where the local county or city provide their own emergency services, private companies provide discharges and transfers from hospitals and to/from other health related facilities and homes. In most areas private companies are part of the local government emergency disaster plan, and are relied upon for the overall EMS response, treatment and recovery.

In some areas, private companies may provide only the patient transport elements of ambulance care (i.e. non-urgent), but in some places, they are contracted to provide emergency care, or to form a 'second tier' response, where they only respond to emergencies when all of the full-time emergency ambulance crews are busy. This may mean that a government or other service provide the 'emergency' cover, whilst a private firm may be charged with 'minor injuries' such as cuts, bruises or even helping the mobility-impaired if they have for example fallen and simply need help to get up again, but do not need treatment. This system has the benefit of keeping emergency crews available at all times for genuine emergencies. These organisations may also provide services known as 'Stand-by' cover at industrial sites or at special events. In Latin America, private ambulance companies are often the only readily-available EMS service.

=== Combined emergency service ===
These are full service emergency service agencies, which may be found in places such as airports or large colleges and universities like for example the UCLA EMS.Their key feature is that all personnel are trained not only in ambulance (EMT) care, but as a firefighter and a peace officer (police function). They may be found in smaller towns and cities, where demand or budget is too low to support separate services. This multi-functionality allows to make the most of limited resource or budget, but having a single team respond to any emergency.

=== Hospital-based service ===
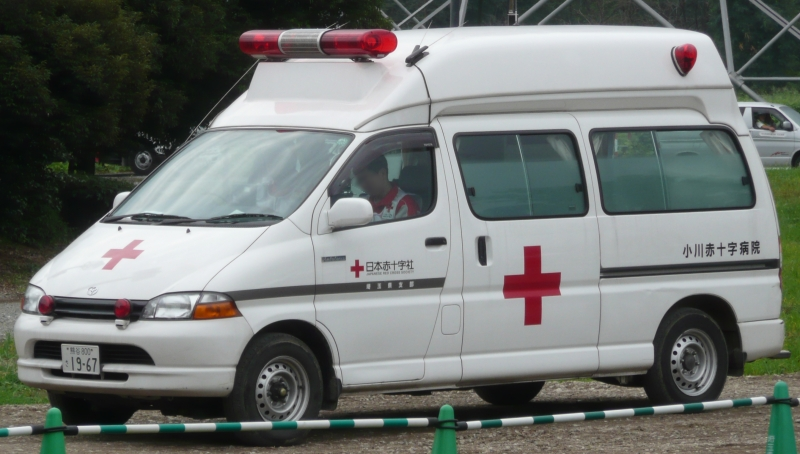
An ambulance belonging to the Ogawa Red Cross Hospital in Ogawa, Saitama, Japan

Hospitals or larger hospital systems may provide their own ambulance service as a service to the community, or where ambulance care is unreliable or chargeable. Many hospital-based EMS departments operate solely with their hospital, though some operate more independently and can transport patients to whichever hospital may be needed or desired.

=== Internal ambulances ===
Many large factories and other industrial centers, such as chemical plants, oil refineries, breweries, and distilleries, have emergency medical services provided by employers as a means of protecting their interests and the welfare of their staff. These are often used as first response vehicles in the event of a fire or explosion.

== Purpose ==
Six points on the Star of Life

Emergency medical services exists to fulfill the basic principles of first aid, which are to Preserve Life, Prevent Further Injury, and Promote Recovery. This common theme in medicine is demonstrated by the "star of life". The Star of Life shown here, where each of the 'arms' to the star represent one of the six points, are used to represent the six stages of high quality pre-hospital care, which are:

1. Early detection – members of the public, or another agency, find the incident and understand the problem
2. Early reporting – the first persons on scene make a call to the emergency medical services (e.g. 911, 999, 112, 000 etc) and provide details to enable a response to be mounted
3. Early response – the first professional (EMS) rescuers are dispatched and arrive on scene as quickly as possible, enabling care to begin
4. Good on-scene/field care – the emergency medical service provides appropriate and timely interventions to treat the patient at the scene of the incident without doing further harm.
5. Care in transit -– the emergency medical service load the patient in to suitable transport and continue to provide appropriate medical care throughout the journey
6. Transfer to definitive care – the patient is handed over to an appropriate care setting, such as the emergency department at a hospital, in to the care of physicians

== Strategies for delivering care ==
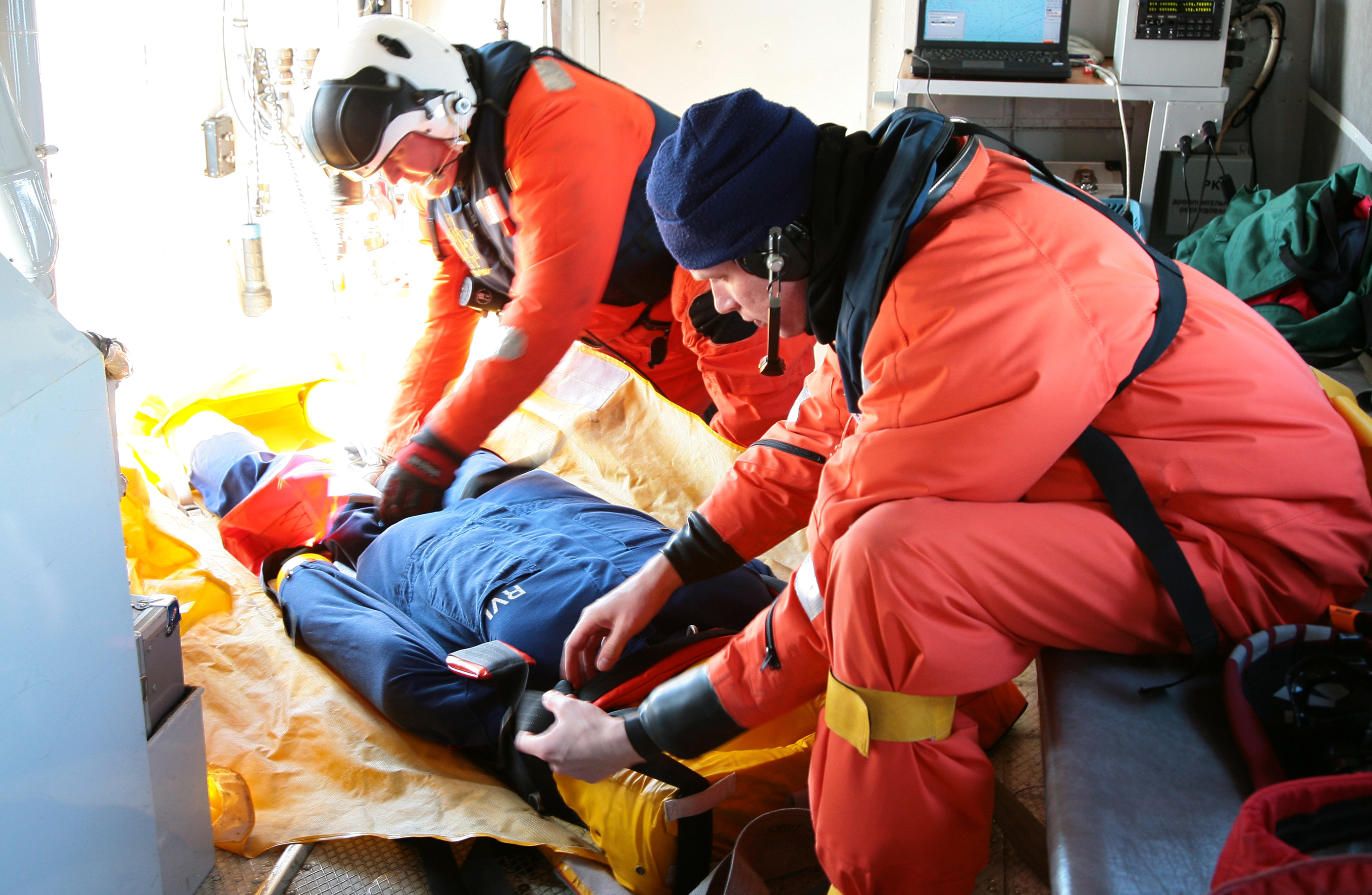
Training for EMS in Estonia

Although a variety of differing philosophical approaches are used in the provision of EMS care around the world, they can generally be placed into one of two categories; one physician-led and the other led by pre-hospital allied health staff such as emergency medical technicians or paramedics. These models are commonly referred to as the Franco-German model and Anglo-American model.

Studies have been inconclusive as to whether one model delivers better results than the other. A 2010 study in the Oman Medical Journal suggested that rapid transport was a better strategy for trauma cases, while stabilization at the scene was a better strategy for cardiac arrests.

=== Levels of care ===
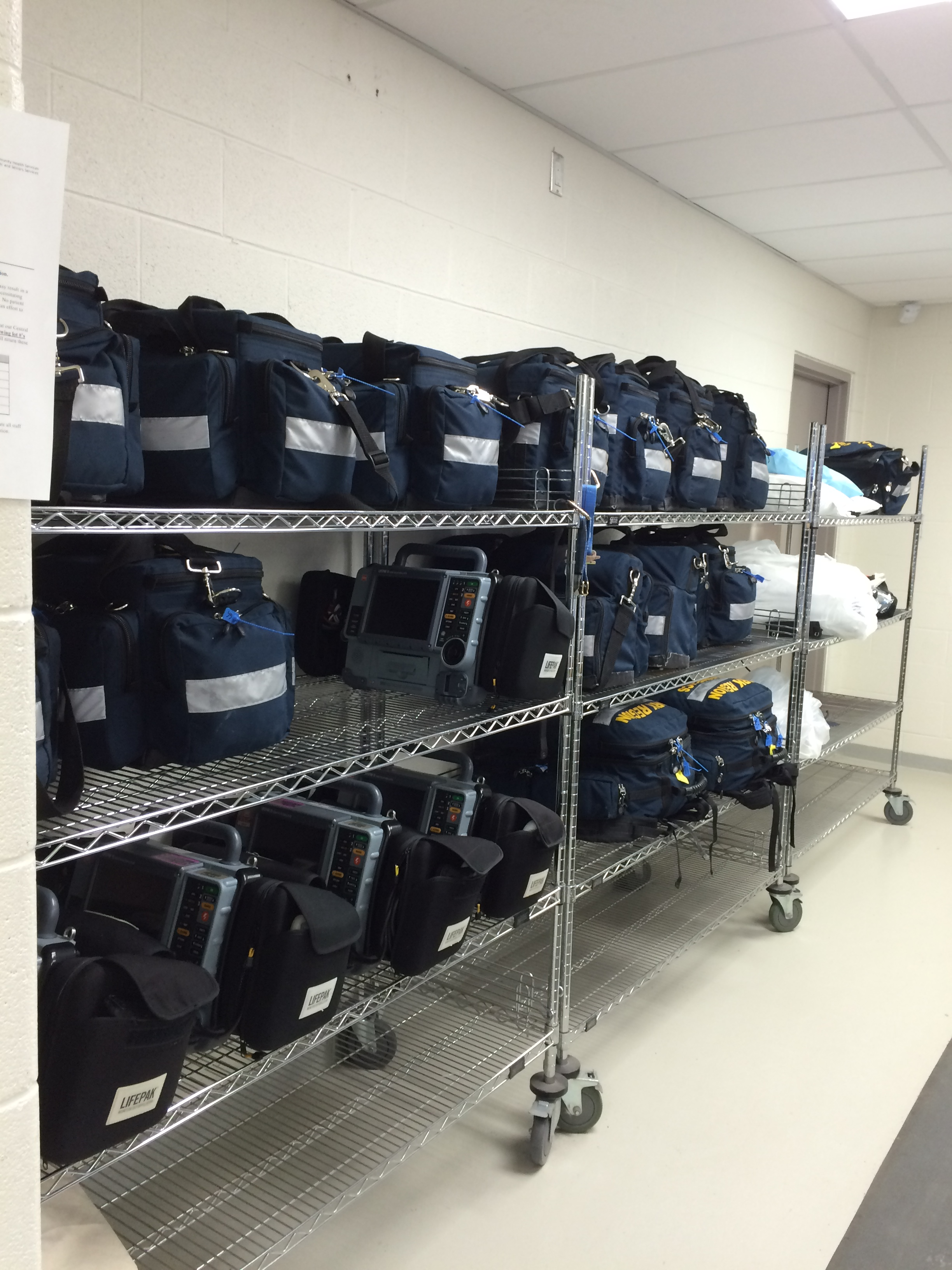
Bags of medical supplies and defibrillators at the York Region EMS Logistics Headquarters in Ontario, Canada

Many systems have tiers of response for medical emergencies. For example, a common arrangement in the United States is that fire engines or volunteers are sent to provide a rapid initial response to a medical emergency, while an ambulance is sent to provide advanced treatment and transport the patient. In France, fire service and private company ambulances provide basic care, while hospital-based ambulances with physicians on board provide advanced care. In many countries, an air ambulance provides a higher level of care than a regular ambulance.

In many metropolitan areas of the United States, EMS and fire departments operate as a single, integrated organization. Most, if not all, personnel are dual-certified in both firefighting and emergency medical services, providing care ranging from Basic Life Support (BLS) to Advanced Life Support (ALS).

Examples of level of care include:

- First aid consists of basic skills that are commonly taught to members of the public, such as cardiopulmonary resuscitation, bandaging wounds and saving someone from choking.
- Basic Life Support (BLS) is often the lowest level of training that can be held by those who treat patients on an ambulance. Commonly, it includes administering oxygen therapy, some drugs and a few invasive treatments. BLS personnel may either operate a BLS ambulance on their own, or assist a higher qualified crewmate on an ALS ambulance. In English-speaking countries, BLS ambulance crew members are known as emergency medical technicians, emergency care assistants or Primary care paramedics in Canada.
- Intermediate Life Support (ILS), also known as Limited Advanced Life Support (LALS), is positioned between BLS and ALS but is less common than both. It is commonly a BLS provider with a moderately expanded skill set (such as an AEMT, but where it is present it usually replaces BLS.
- Advanced Life Support (ALS) has a considerably expanded range of skills such as intravenous therapy, endotracheal intubation, cricothyrotomy and interpretation of electrocardiograms. The scope of this higher tier response varies considerably by country. Paramedics commonly provide ALS, but some countries require it to be a higher level of care and instead employ physicians in this role. Additionally Advanced Life Support includes administering therapeutic doses of electrical shock to those who are in cardiac arrest or using drugs to stimulate the heart, Airway therapy, and so on and so forth. Most ambulances are equipped with advanced Life Support equipment and have paramedics on board. While some fire departments have ambulances, first aid and squads utilize ambulances for emergency medical services.
- Critical Care Transport (CCT or CCP), also known as medical retrieval or rendez vous MICU protocol in some countries (Australia, NZ, Great Britain, and Francophone Canada) refers to the critical care transport of patients between hospitals (as opposed to pre-hospital). Such services are a key element in regionalized systems of hospital care where intensive care services are centralized to a few specialist hospitals. An example of this is the Emergency Medical Retrieval Service in Scotland. This level of care is likely to involve traditional healthcare professionals (in addition to or instead of critical care-trained paramedics), meaning nurses and/or physicians working in the pre-hospital setting and even on ambulances.

=== Transport-only ===
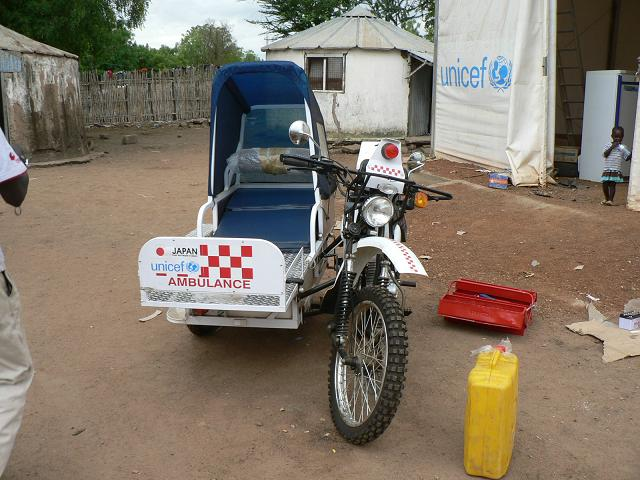
A motorcycle ambulance in South Sudan

The most basic emergency medical services are provided as a transport operation only, simply to take patients from their location to the nearest medical treatment. This was historically the case in all countries. It remains the case in much of the developing world, where operators as diverse as taxi drivers and undertakers may transport people to hospital.

=== Transport-centered EMS ===
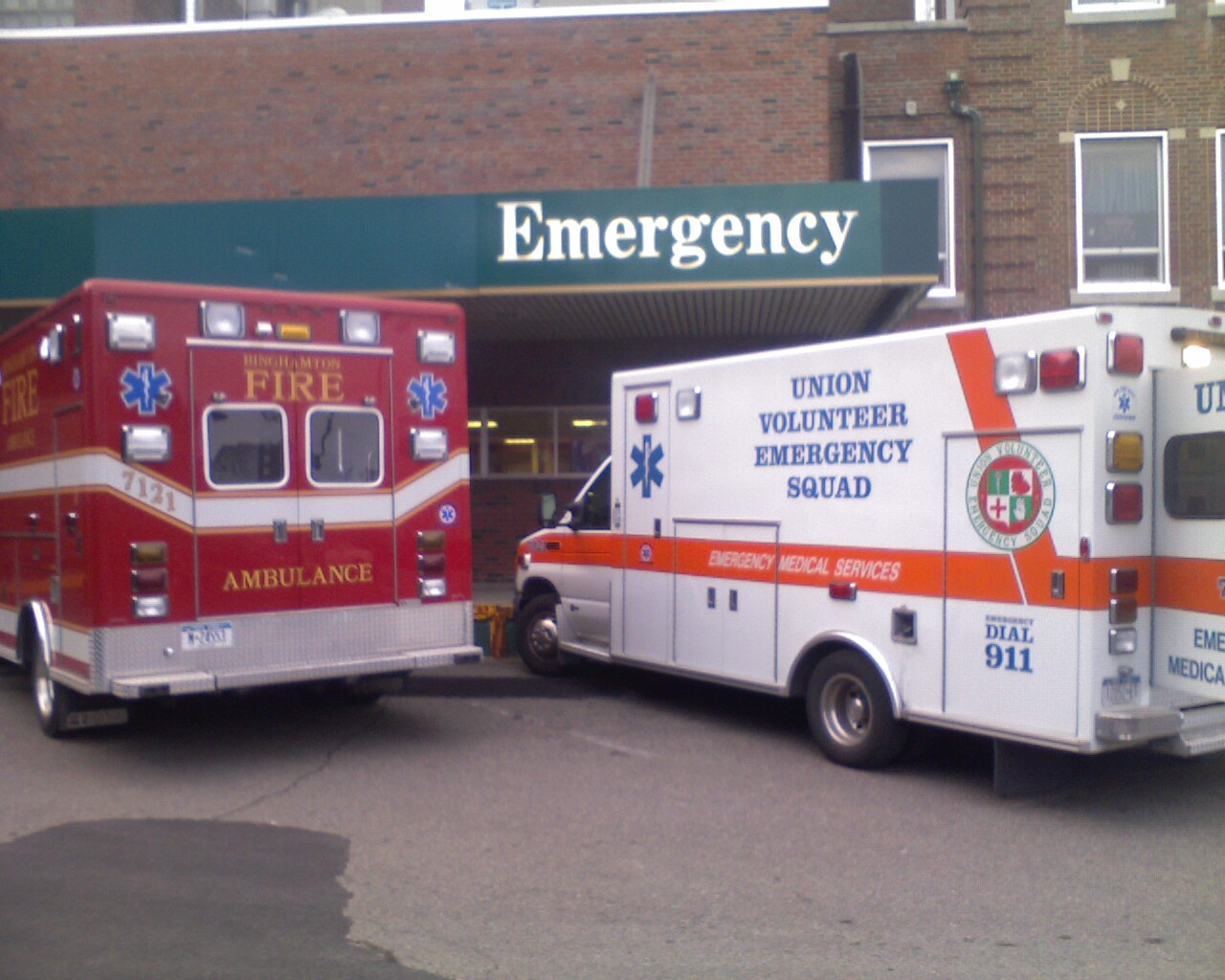
Ambulances parked outside an emergency room in Binghamton, New York

The Anglo-American model is also known as "load and go" or "scoop and run". In this model, ambulances are staffed by paramedics and/or emergency medical technicians. They have specialized medical training, but not to the same level as a physician. In this model it is rare to find a physician actually working routinely in ambulances, although they may be deployed to major or complex cases. The physicians who work in EMS provide oversight for the work of the ambulance crews. This may include off-line medical control, where they devise protocols or 'standing orders' (procedures for treatment). This may also include on-line medical control, in which the physician is contacted via radio or phone to provide advice and authorization for various medical interventions or for a patient's desire to refuse care.

In some cases, such as in the UK, South Africa and Australia, a paramedic may be an autonomous medical professional, and does not require the permission of a physician to administer interventions or medications from an agreed list, and can perform roles such as suturing or prescribing medication to the patient. Recently "Telemedicine" has been making an appearance in ambulances. Similar to online medical control, this practice allows paramedics to remotely transmit data such as vital signs and 12 and 15 lead ECGs to the hospital from the field. This allows the emergency department to prepare to treat patients prior to their arrival. This is allowing lower level providers (Such as EMT-B) in the United States to utilize these advanced technologies and have the doctor interpret them, thus bringing rapid identification of rhythms to areas where paramedics are stretched thin. While most insurance companies only reimburse EMS providers for transporting patients to 911 receiving facilities (e.g. Emergency Departments), the Center to Medicare and Medicaid Services is in the process of evaluating a payment model to enable reimbursement for patients evaluated and treated on-scene.

==== Major trauma ====
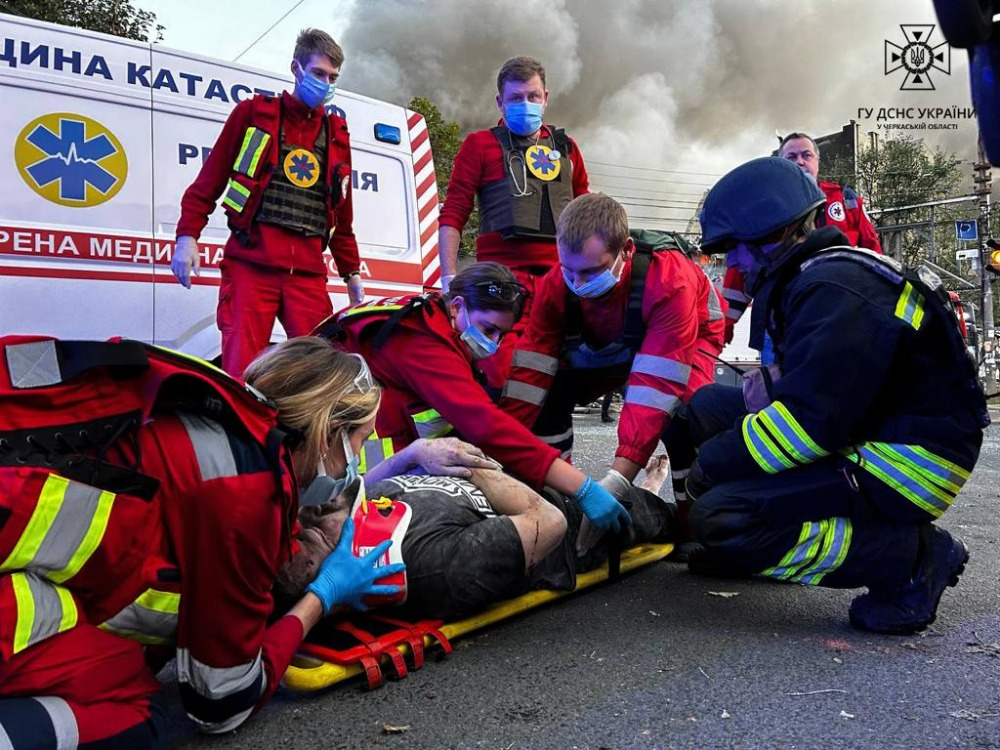
Ukrainian emergency medical service personnel responding to a Russian missile strike in Cherkasy, 21 September 2023.

The essential decision in prehospital care is whether the patient should be immediately taken to the hospital, or advanced care resources are taken to the patient where they lie. The "scoop and run" approach is exemplified by the MEDEVAC aeromedical evacuation helicopter, whereas the "stay and play" is exemplified by the French and Belgian SMUR emergency mobile resuscitation unit or the German "Notarzt"-System (preclinical emergency physician).

The strategy developed for prehospital trauma care in North America is based on the Golden Hour theory, i.e., that a trauma victim's best chance for survival is in an operating room, with the goal of having the patient in surgery within an hour of the traumatic event. This appears to be true in cases of internal bleeding, especially penetrating trauma such as gunshot or stab wounds. Thus, minimal time is spent providing prehospital care (spine immobilization; "ABCs", i.e. ensure airway, breathing and circulation; external bleeding control; endotracheal intubation) and the victim is transported as fast as possible to a trauma centre.

The aim in "Scoop and Run" treatment is generally to transport the patient within ten minutes of arrival, hence the birth of the phrase, "the platinum ten minutes" (in addition to the "golden hour"), now commonly used in EMT training programs. The "Scoop and Run" is a method developed to deal with trauma, rather than strictly medical situations (e.g. cardiac or respiratory emergencies), however, this may be changing. Increasingly, research into the management of S-T segment elevation myocardial infarctions (STEMI) occurring outside of the hospital, or even inside community hospitals without their own PCI labs, suggests that time to treatment is a clinically significant factor in heart attacks, and that trauma patients may not be the only patients for whom 'load and go' is clinically appropriate. In such conditions, the gold standard is the door to balloon time. The longer the time interval, the greater the damage to the myocardium, and the poorer the long-term prognosis for the patient. Current research in Canada has suggested that door to balloon times are significantly lower when appropriate patients are identified by paramedics in the field, instead of the emergency room, and then transported directly to a waiting PCI lab. The STEMI program has reduced STEMI deaths in the Ottawa region by 50 per cent. In a related program in Toronto, EMS has begun to use a procedure of 'rescuing' STEMI patients from the Emergency Rooms of hospitals without PCI labs, and transporting them, on an emergency basis, to waiting PCI labs in other hospitals.

=== Physician-led EMS ===
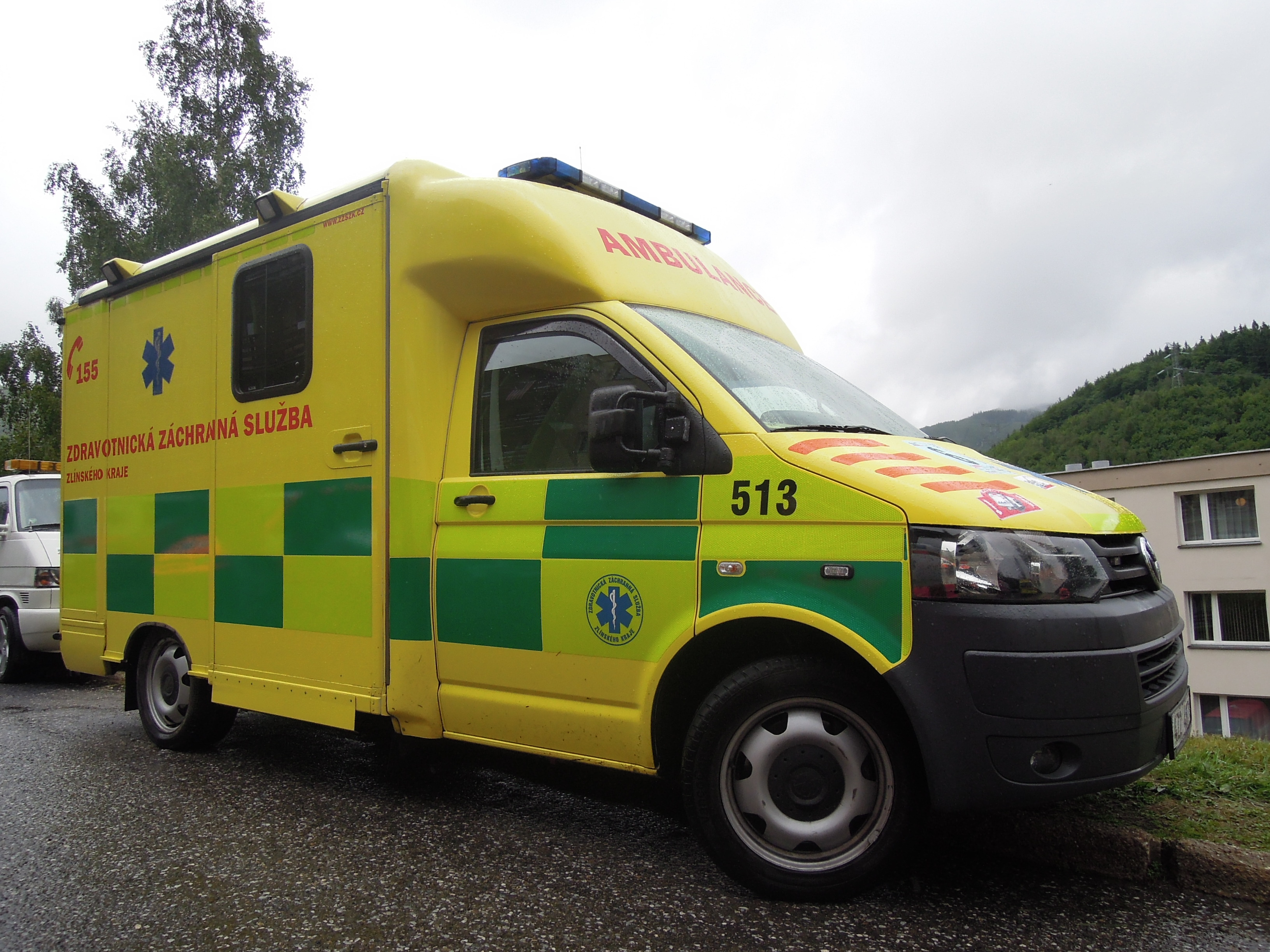
Ambulance in the Czech Republic

Physician-led EMS is also known as the Franco-German model, "stay and play", "stay and stabilize" or "delay and treat". In a physician-led system, doctors respond directly to all major emergencies requiring more than simple first aid. The physicians will attempt to treat casualties at the scene and will only transport them to hospital if it is deemed necessary. If patients are transported to hospital, they are more likely to go straight to a ward rather than to an emergency department. Countries that use this model include Austria, France, Belgium, Luxembourg, Italy, Spain, Brazil and Chile.

In some cases in this model, such as France, there is no direct equivalent to a paramedic. Physicians and (in some cases) nurses provide all medical interventions for the patient. Other ambulance personnel are not non-medically trained and only provide driving and heavy lifting. In other applications of this model, as in Germany, a paramedic equivalent does exist, but is an assistant to the physician with a restricted scope of practice. They are only permitted to perform Advanced Life Support (ALS) procedures if authorized by the physician, or in cases of immediate life-threatening conditions. Ambulances in this model tend to be better equipped with more advanced medical devices, in essence, bringing the emergency department to the patient. High-speed transport to hospitals is considered, in most cases, to be unnecessarily unsafe, and the preference is to remain and provide definitive care to the patient until they are medically stable, and then accomplish transport. In this model, the physician and nurse may actually staff an ambulance along with a driver, or may staff a rapid response vehicle instead of an ambulance, providing medical support to multiple ambulances.

== Personnel ==
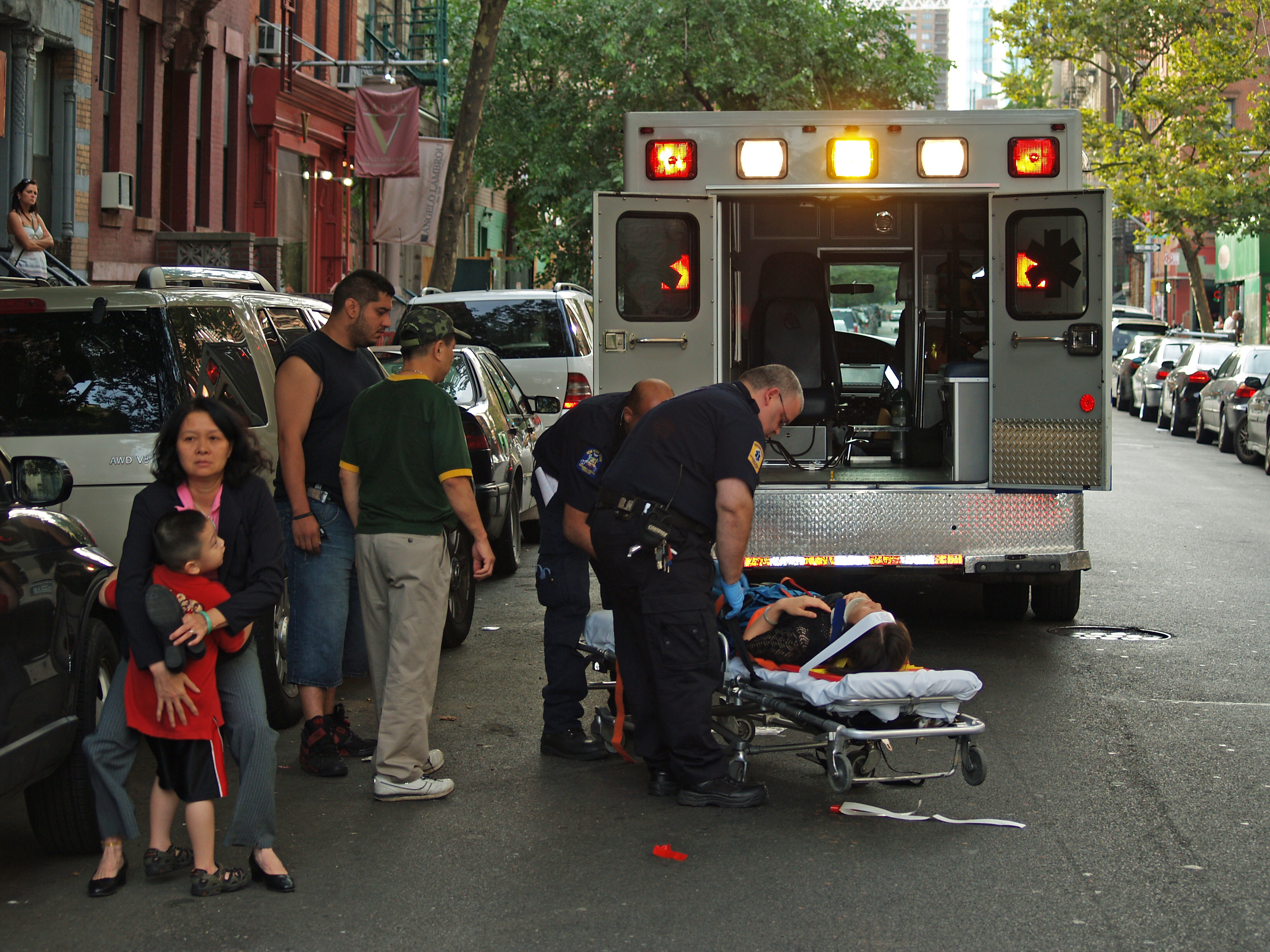
EMT staff at an emergency call in New York City

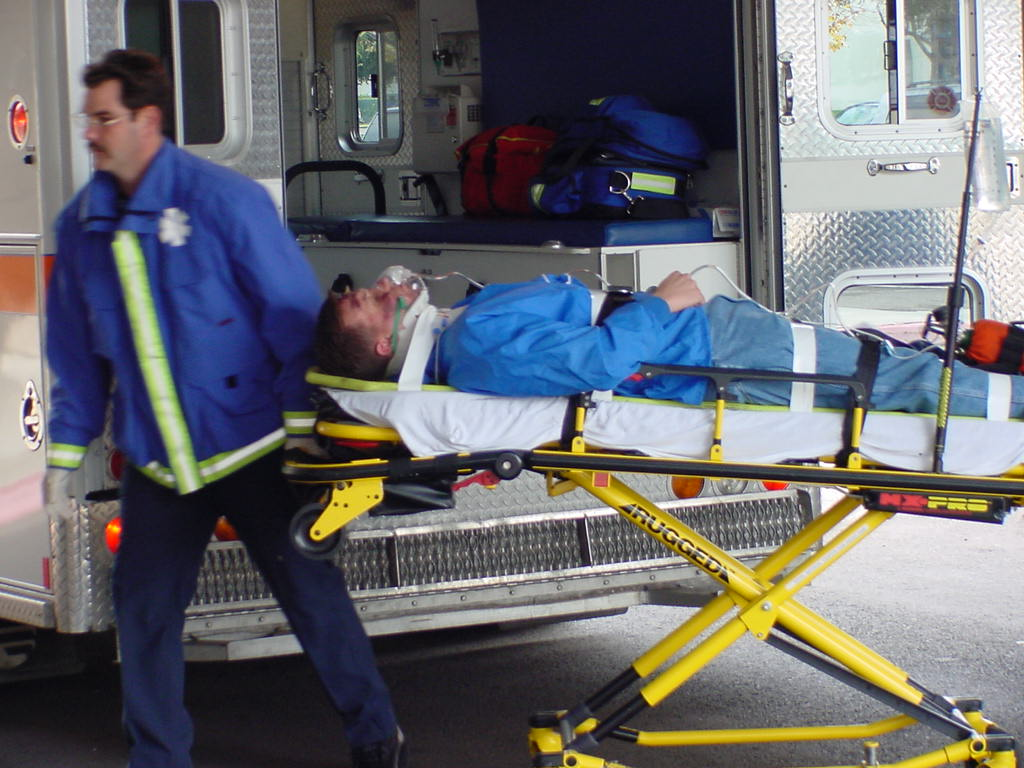
A patient arriving at a hospital

Ambulance personnel are generally professionals and in some countries their use is controlled through training and registration. While these job titles are protected by legislation in some countries, this protection is by no means universal, and anyone might, for example, call themselves an 'EMT' or a 'paramedic', regardless of their training, or the lack of it. In some jurisdictions, both technicians and paramedics may be further defined by the environment in which they operate, including such designations as 'Wilderness', 'Tactical', and so on.

A unique aspect of EMS is that there are two hierarchies of authority, as the chain of command is separate to medical authority.

=== Basic life support (BLS) ===
==== Emergency medical dispatcher ====
An emergency medical dispatcher is also called an EMD. An increasingly common addition to the EMS system is the use of highly trained dispatch personnel who can provide "pre-arrival" instructions to callers reporting medical emergencies. They use carefully structured questioning techniques and provide scripted instructions to allow callers or bystanders to begin definitive care for such critical problems as airway obstructions, bleeding, childbirth, and cardiac arrest. Even with a fast response time by a first responder measured in minutes, some medical emergencies evolve in seconds. Such a system provides, in essence, a "zero response time", and can have an enormous impact on positive patient outcomes.

==== First responder ====
Certified first responders may be sent to provide first aid, sometimes to an advanced level. Their duties include the provision of immediate life-saving care in the event of a medical emergency; commonly advanced first aid, oxygen administration, cardio-pulmonary resuscitation (CPR), and automated external defibrillator (AED) usage. The first responder training is considered a bare minimum for emergency service workers who may be sent out in response to an emergency call. First responders are commonly dispatched by the ambulance service to arrive quickly and stabilize the patient before the ambulance arrives, and to then assist the ambulance crew.

Some EMS agencies have set up volunteer schemes, who can be dispatched to a medical emergency before the ambulance arrives. Examples of this include Community First Responder schemes run by ambulance services the UK and similar volunteer schemes operated by the fire services in France. In some countries such as the US, there may be autonomous groups of volunteer responders such as rescue squads. Police officers and firefighters who are on duty for another emergency service may also be deployed in this role, though some firefighters are trained to a more advanced medical level. Some volunteer-based EMS agencies or rescue squads may sponsor the training of volunteers or offer subsidized costs for EMT training courses.

Besides first responders who are deployed to an emergency, there are others who may be stationed at public events. The International Red Cross and Red Crescent Movement and St John Ambulance both provide first aiders in these roles.

==== Ambulance driver ====
Some agencies separate the 'driver' and 'attendant' functions, employing ambulance driving staff with no medical qualification (or just a first aid and CPR certificates), whose job is to drive ambulances. While this approach persists in some countries, such as India, it is generally becoming increasingly rare. Ambulance drivers may be trained in radio communications, ambulance operations and emergency response driving skills.

==== Non-emergency attendant ====
Many countries employ ambulance staff who only carry out non-emergency patient transport duties (which can include stretcher or wheelchair cases). Dependent on the provider (and resources available), they may be trained in first aid or extended skills such as use of an AED, oxygen therapy, pain relief and other live-saving or palliative skills. In some services, they may also provide emergency cover when other units are not available, or when accompanied by a fully qualified technician or paramedic. The role is known as an Ambulance Care Assistant in the United Kingdom.

==== Emergency care assistant ====
Emergency care assistants are of a frontline under both emergency and non-emergency conditions to incidents. Their role is to assist the clinician that they are working with, either a Technician or Paramedic, in their duties, whether that be drawing up drugs, setting up fluids (but not attaching), doing basic observations or performing 12 lead ECG assessments.

==== Emergency medical technician ====
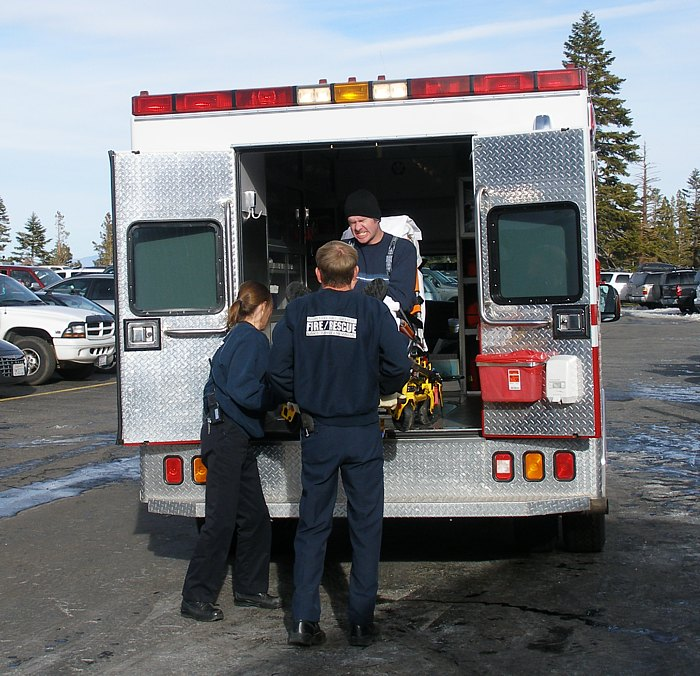
EMTs loading a patient into an ambulance

Emergency medical technicians are usually able to perform a wide range of emergency care skills, such as automated defibrillation, care of spinal injuries and oxygen therapy. In few jurisdictions, some EMTs are able to perform duties as IV and IO cannulation, administration of a limited number of drugs (including but not limited to Epinephrine, Narcan, Oxygen, Aspirin, Nitroglycerin – dependent on country, state, and medical direction), more advanced airway procedures, CPAP, and limited cardiac monitoring. Most advanced procedures and skills are not within the national scope of practice for an EMT. As such most states require additional training and certifications to perform above the national curriculum standards. In the United States, an EMT certification requires intense courses and training in field skills. Certifications are state-specific and last varying durations, though National Registry certification simplifies the reciprocity process in many states. The National Registry of Emergency Medical Technicians renamed the certification levels for EMS professionals as follows: Emergency Medical Responder (NREMR), Emergency Medical Technician (NREMT), Advanced EMT (NRAEMT), and Paramedic (NRP).

=== Advanced life support (ALS) ===
==== Paramedic ====
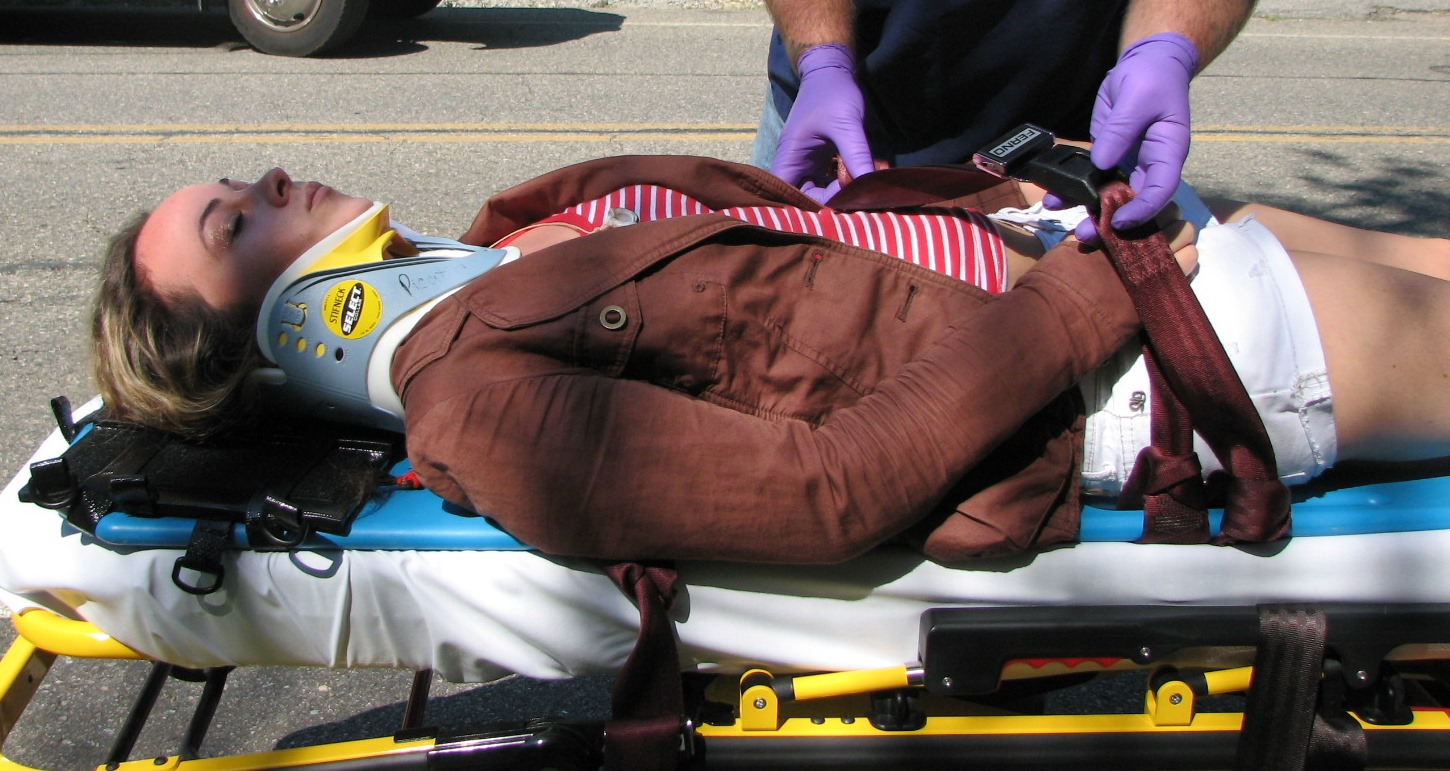
A girl treated by a paramedic

A paramedic has a high level of pre-hospital medical training and usually involves key skills not performed by technicians, often including cannulation (and with it the ability to use a range of drugs to relieve pain, correct cardiac problems, and perform endotracheal intubation), cardiac monitoring, 12-lead ECG interpretation, ultrasound, intubation, pericardiocentesis, cardioversion, thoracostomy, and other skills such as performing a surgical cricothyrotomy. The most important function of the paramedic is to identify and treat any life-threatening conditions and then to assess the patient carefully for other complaints or findings that may require emergency treatment. In many countries, this is a protected title, and use of it without the relevant qualification may result in criminal prosecution. In the United States, paramedics represent the highest licensure level of prehospital emergency care. In addition, several certifications exist for Paramedics such as Wilderness ALS Care, Flight Paramedic Certification (FP-C), and Critical Care Emergency Medical Transport Program certification.

==== Critical care paramedic ====
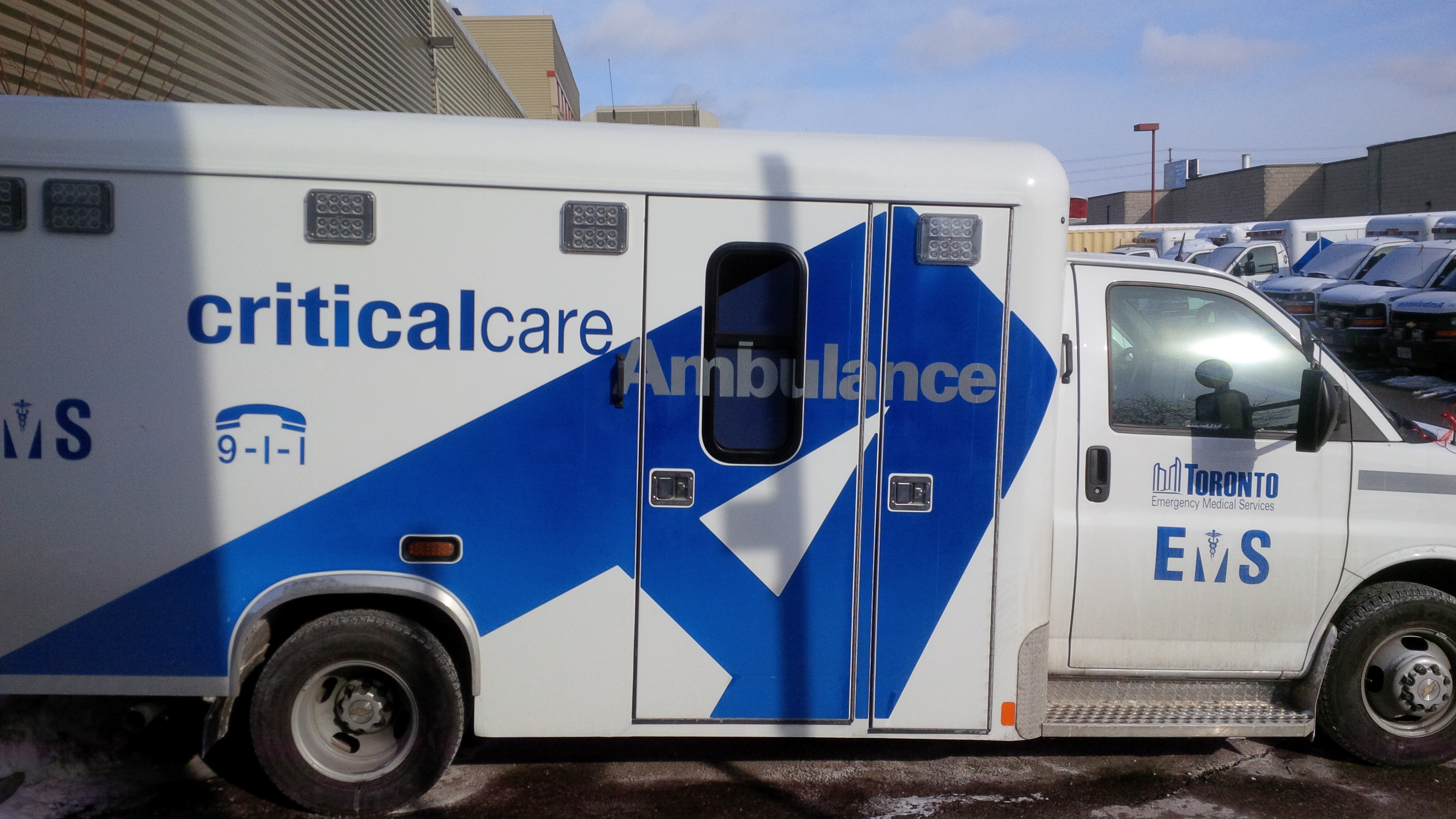
A Toronto Paramedic Services Critical Care ambulance

A critical care paramedic, also known as an advanced practice paramedic or specialist paramedic, is a paramedic with additional training to deal with critically ill patients. Critical care paramedics often work on air ambulances, which are more likely to be dispatched to emergencies requiring advanced care skills. They may also work on land ambulances. The training, permitted skills, and certification requirements vary from one jurisdiction to the next. It also varies to whether they are trained externally by a university or professional body or 'in house' by their EMS agency.

These providers have a vast array of and medications to handle complex medical and trauma patients. Examples of medication are dobutamine, dopamine, Propofol, blood and blood products to name just a few. Some examples of skills include, but not limited to, life support systems normally restricted to the ICU or critical care hospital setting such as mechanical ventilators, Intra-aortic balloon pump (IABP) and external pacemaker monitoring. Depending on the service medical direction, these providers are trained on placement and use of UVCs (Umbilical Venous Catheter), UACs (Umbilical Arterial Catheter), surgical airways, central lines, arterial lines and chest tubes.

==== Emergency care practitioner ====
In the United Kingdom and South Africa, some serving paramedics receive additional university education to become practitioners in their own right, which gives them absolute responsibility for their clinical judgement, including the ability to autonomously prescribe medications. An emergency care practitioner or paramedic practitioner is a position that is designed to bridge the link between ambulance care and the care of a general practitioner. ECPs are university graduates in Emergency Medical Care or qualified paramedics who have undergone further training, and are authorized to perform specialized techniques. Additionally some may prescribe medicines for longer-term care, such as antibiotics and in the United Kingdom they can prescribe a broad range of medicines. With respect to a Primary Health Care setting, they are also educated in a range of Diagnostic techniques.

=== Traditional healthcare professionals in EMS ===
==== Registered nurses ====
The use of registered nurses (RNs) in the pre-hospital setting is common in many countries in absence of paramedics. In some regions of the world nurses are the primary healthcare worker that provides emergency medical services. In European countries such as France or Italy, also use nurses as a means of providing ALS services. These nurses may work under the direct supervision of a physician, or, in rarer cases, independently. In some places in Europe, notably Norway, paramedics do exist, but the role of the 'ambulance nurse' continues to be developed, as it is felt that nurses may bring unique skills to some situations encountered by ambulance crews.

In North America, and to a lesser extent elsewhere in the English-speaking world, some jurisdictions use specially trained nurses for medical transport work. These are mostly air-medical personnel or critical care transport providers, often working in conjunction with a technician, paramedic or physician on emergency interfacility transports. In the United States, the most common uses of ambulance-based registered nurses is in the Critical Care/Mobile Intensive Care transport, and in Aeromedical EMS. Such nurses are normally required by their employers (in the US) to seek additional certifications beyond the primary nursing licensure. Four individual states have an Intensive Care or Prehospital Nurse licensure. Many states allow registered nurses to also become registered paramedics according to their role in the emergency medical services team. In Estonia 60% of ambulance teams are led by nurse. Ambulance nurses can do almost all emergency procedures and administer medicines pre-hospital such as physicians in Estonia. In the Netherlands, all ambulances are staffed by a registered nurse with additional training in emergency nursing, anesthesia or critical care, and a driver-EMT. In Sweden, since 2005, all emergency ambulances should be staffed by at least one registered nurse since only nurses are allowed to administer drugs. And all Advanced Life Support Ambulances are staffed at least by a registered nurse in Spain. In France, since 1986, fire department-based rescue ambulances have had the option of providing resuscitation service (reanimation) using specially trained nurses, operating on protocols, while SAMU-SMUR units are staffed by physicians and nurses

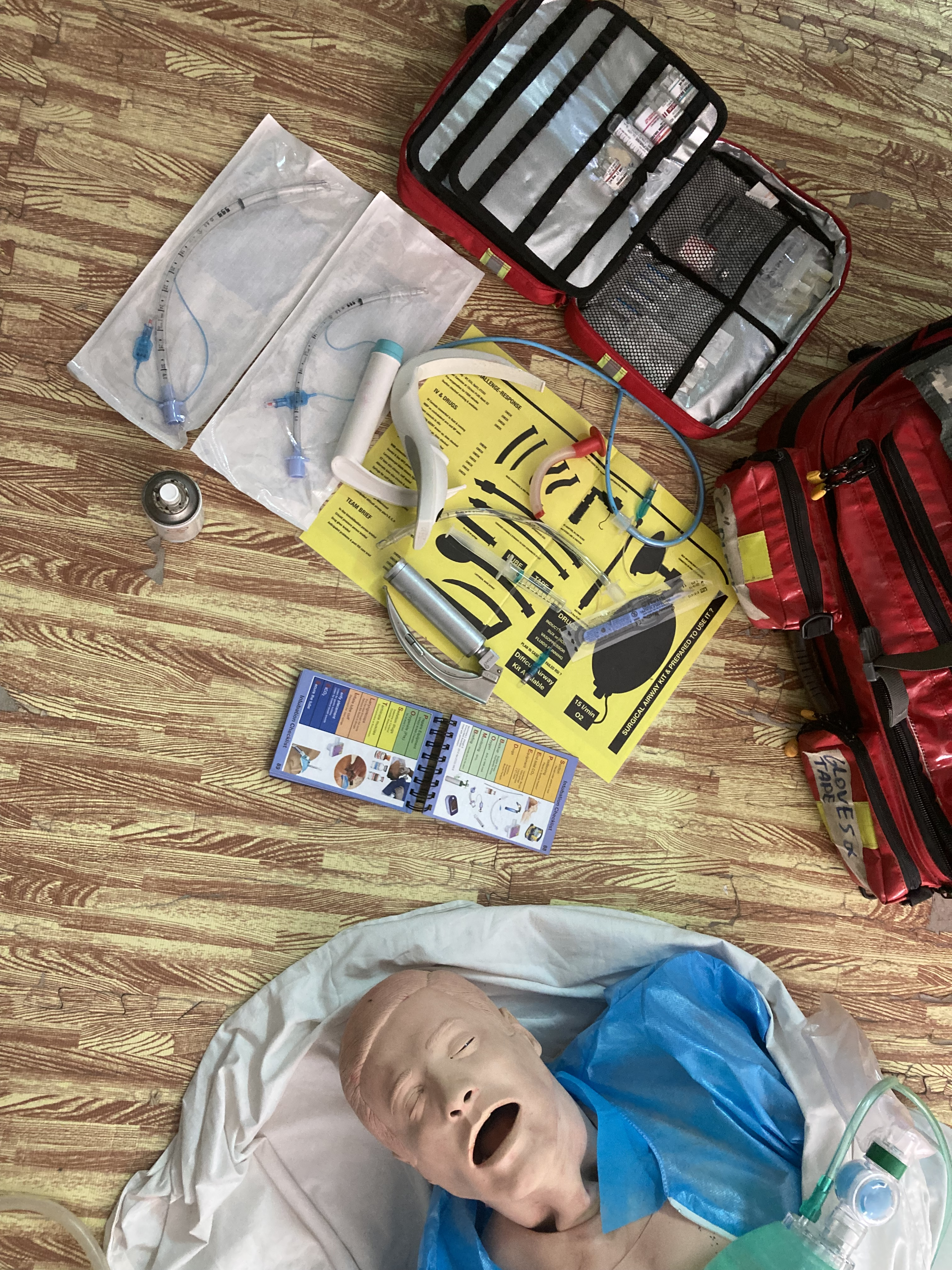
Prehospital anaesthesia training

==== Physician ====
In countries with a physician-led EMS model, such as France, Italy, the German-speaking countries (Germany, Switzerland, Austria), and Spain, physicians respond to all cases that require more than basic first aid. In some versions of this model (such as France, Italy, and Spain), there is no direct equivalent to a paramedic, as ALS is performed by physicians. In the German-speaking countries, paramedics are assistants to ambulance physicians (called Notarzt). In these countries, if a physician is present, paramedics require permission from the physician to administer treatments such as defibrillation and drugs. If there is no physician on scene and a life-threatening condition is present, they may administer treatments that follow the physician's instructions.

In countries where EMS is led by paramedics, the ambulance service may still employ physicians. They may serve on specialist response vehicles, such as the air ambulances in the UK. They may also provide advice and devise protocols for treatment, with a medical director acting as the most senior medical adviser to the ambulance service. In the United States, EMS became an officially recognized subspecialty by the American Board of Emergency Medicine in 2010, and the first examinations were held in 2013. Many states now recommend EMS board certification for newly hired medical directors of EMS agencies.

== Specialist EMS ==
=== Air ambulances ===
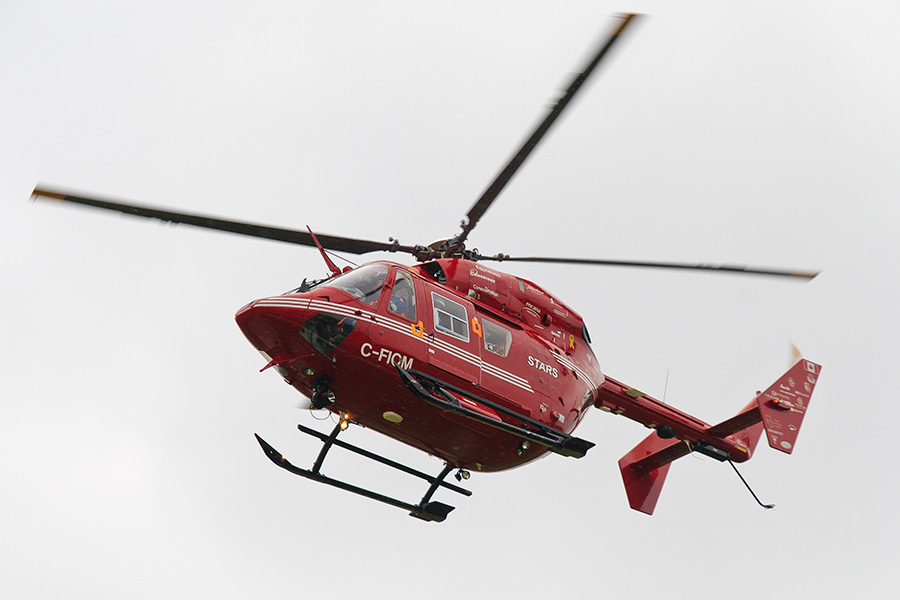
A Canadian STARS helicopter ambulance. Air ambulances often have staff who are specially trained for dealing with major trauma cases.

Air ambulances (also known as medevac) often complement a land ambulance service. In some remote areas, they may even form the primary ambulance service. Like many innovations in EMS, medical aircraft were first used in the military. One of the first recorded aircraft rescues of a casualty was in 1917 in Turkey, when a soldier in the Camel Corps who had been shot in the ankle was flown to hospital in a de Havilland DH9. In 1928, the first civilian air medical service was founded in Australia to provide healthcare to people living in remote parts of the Outback. This service became the Royal Flying Doctor Service. The use of helicopters was pioneered in the Korean War, when time to reach a medical facility was reduced from 8 hours to 3 hours in World War II, and again to 2 hours by the Vietnam War.

Aircraft can travel faster and operate in a wider coverage area than a land ambulance. They have a particular advantage for major trauma injuries, especially when they occur in rural or isolated areas. The well-established theory of the golden hour suggests that major trauma patients should be transported as quickly as possible to a specialist trauma center. Therefore, medical first responders in a helicopter can provide both a higher level of care at the scene, faster transport to a specialist hospital and critical care during the journey. A disadvantage is that it can be dangerous and potentially not possible for them to fly at night or in bad weather.

=== Tactical (hazardous area) ===
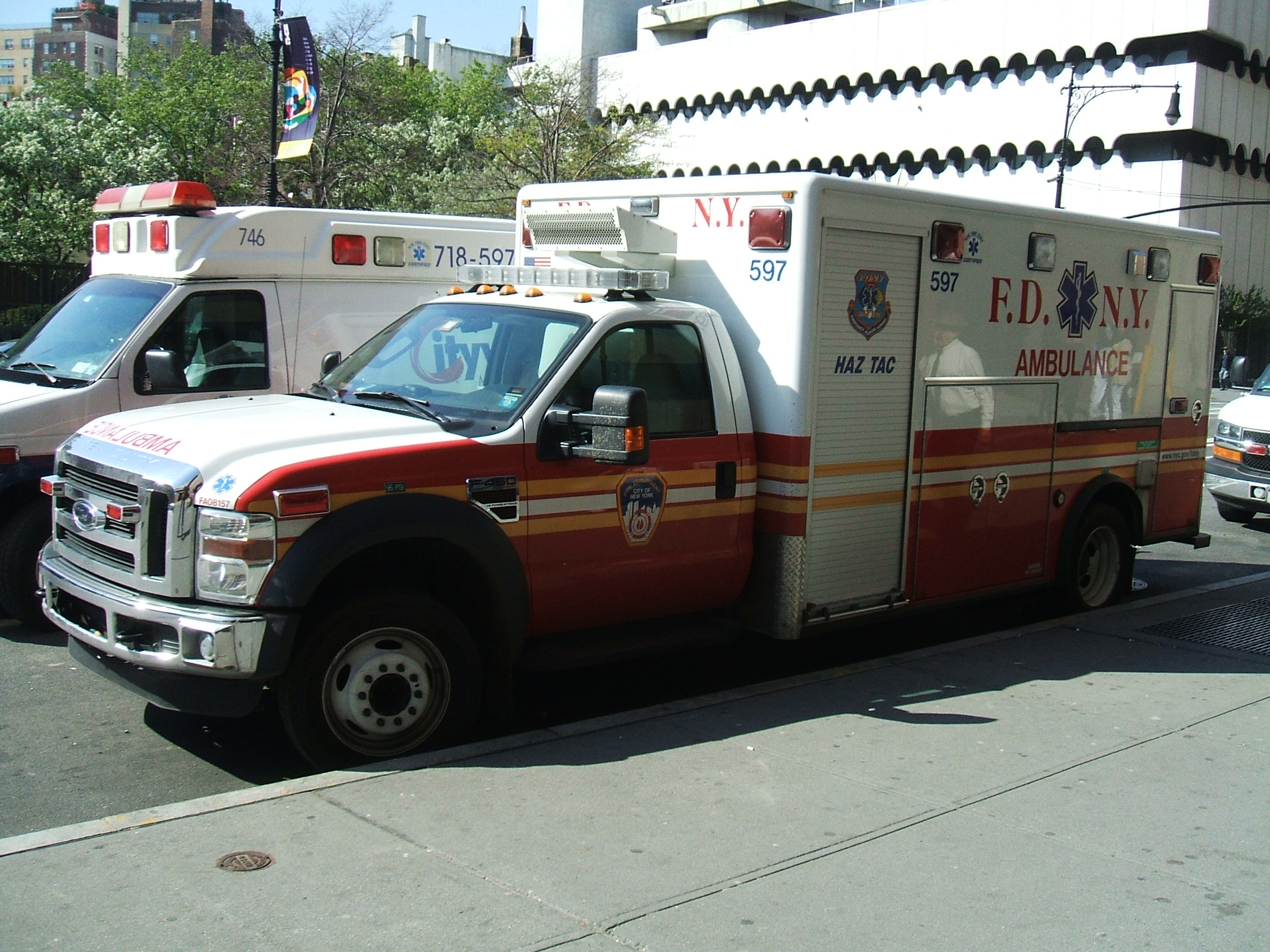
New York City Fire Department Haz-Tac Ambulance

Some EMS agencies have set up specialist teams to help those injured in a major incident or a dangerous situation. These include tactical police operations, active shooters, bombings, hazmat situations, building collapses, fires and natural disasters. In the US, these are often known as Tactical EMS teams and are often deployed alongside police SWAT teams. The equivalent in UK ambulance services is a Hazardous Area Response Team (HART).

=== Wilderness ===
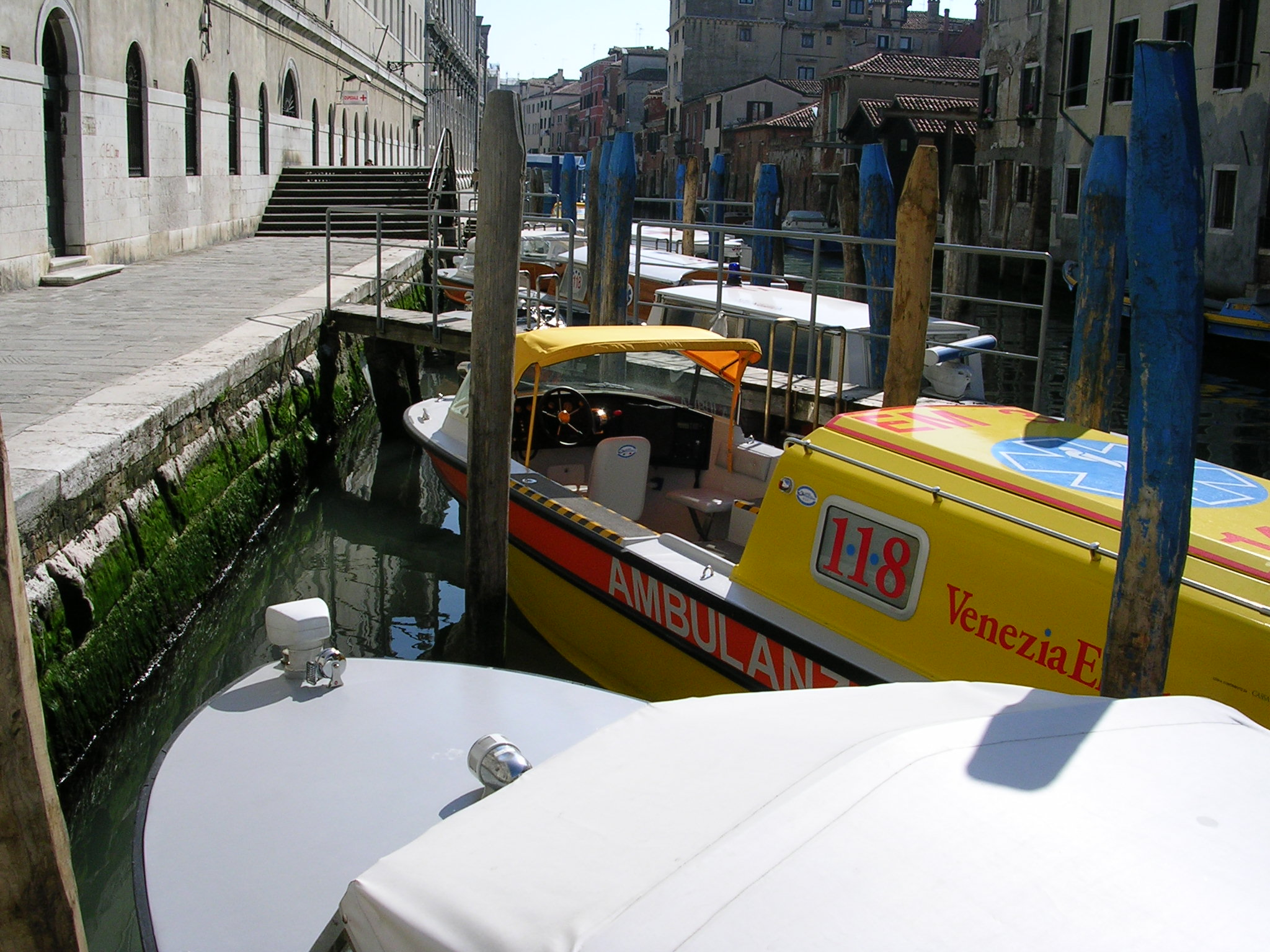
Water ambulance in Venice, Italy

Wilderness EMS-like systems (WEMS) have been developed to provide medical responses in remote areas, which may have significantly different needs to an urban area. Examples include the National Ski Patrol or the regional-responding Appalachian Search and Rescue Conference (USA based). Like traditional EMS providers, all wilderness emergency medical (WEM) providers must still operate under on-line or off-line medical oversight. To assist physicians in the skills necessary to provide this oversight, the Wilderness Medical Society and the National Association of EMS Physicians jointly supported the development in 2011 of a unique "Wilderness EMS Medical Director" certification course, which was cited by the Journal of EMS as one of the Top 10 EMS Innovations of 2011. Skills taught in WEMT courses exceeding the EMT-Basic scope of practice include catheterization, antibiotic administration, use of intermediate Blind Insertion Airway Devices (i.e. King Laryngeal Tube), Nasogastric Intubation, and simple suturing; however, the scope of practice for the WEMT still falls under BLS level care. A multitude of organizations provide WEM training, including private schools, non-profit organizations such as the Appalachian Center for Wilderness Medicine and the Wilderness EMS Institute, military branches, community colleges and universities, EMS-college-hospital collaborations, and others.

== Occupational health hazards in EMS ==
=== Hazards ===
The rate of occupational injuries for EMS workers is greater than the rate for the general population. Occupational hazards for health professionals are well studied and generally apply to EMS. Occupational health hazards in emergency medical services include lifting injuries, violent patients, transportation incidents and harmful exposures (exposure to loud noises, chemicals and infectious diseases).

The National Institute of Occupational Safety and Health (NIOSH) established that the most common injury/illness of EMS clinicians are sprains/strains (41%) and exposures (20%). The occupational hazard with the greatest rate of lethality in Emergency Medical Services is ground and air ambulance crashes. Crashes are uncommon and Injuries from crashes make up less than 8% of injuries to EMS clinicians.

=== Hazard Mitigation ===
In the US, OSHA and CDC associated NIOSH have published guidelines to protect EMS workers from the occupational hazards presented by the job's requirements. These guidelines include sanitization practices, PPE requirements, and fatigue protocols. Fundamental facets of safety, such as providing workers with clear roles and clear communication of expectations to discourage risk-taking and encourage safe practices are essential to minimize occupational hazards.

Overexertion injuries can be avoided with core training, increasing flexibility, and improving muscular endurance. Safe lifting form is encouraged. Exposure to chemical, biological, sensory and physical hazards can all be mitigated with an increased use of PPE. Psychosocial hazards such as job stress and exposure to violence or trauma can be managed with peer support resources for emergency responders who are suffering mental health effects. Most (80%) of states have established independent agency critical incident stress debriefing/management (CISD/M) programs that come into action whenever an incident is deemed particularly traumatic. Transportation related injury and fatality can be minimized with better driver training programs and protocols.

== Organization in different countries ==
- Emergency medical services in Austria
- Emergency medical services in Australia
- Emergency medical services in Belgium
- Emergency medical services in Brazil
- Emergency medical services in Canada
- Emergency medical services in Finland
- Emergency medical services in France
- Emergency medical services in Germany
- Emergency medical services in Hong Kong
- Emergency medical services in Iceland
- Emergency medical services in Iran
- Emergency medical services in Ireland
- Emergency medical services in Israel
- Emergency medical services in Italy
- Emergency Medical Services in Japan
- Emergency medical services in the Netherlands
- Emergency medical services in New Zealand
- Emergency medical services in Norway
- Emergency medical services in Nigeria
- Emergency medical services in Pakistan
- Emergency medical services in Poland
- Emergency medical services in Portugal
- Emergency medical services in Romania
- Emergency medical services in Russia
- Emergency medical services in Spain
- Emergency medical services in South Africa
- Emergency medical services in Sri Lanka
- Emergency medical services in Ukraine
- Emergency medical services in the United Kingdom
- Emergency medical services in the United States
- Emergency medical services in Switzerland

== See also ==
- Battlefield medicine
- CEN 1789
- First Aid Care Team, a rapid-response emergency unit in Chicago disbanded in 2005.
- Good Samaritan law
- In case of emergency, a programme that enables EMS workers to identify victims and contact their next of kin to obtain important medical information
- List of EMS provider credentials
- Mass Gathering Medicine
- Medical amnesty policy
- Public utility model, a model for organizing emergency medical services
- Star of Life
- Wilderness medicine
