= Emergency medical services in Finland =

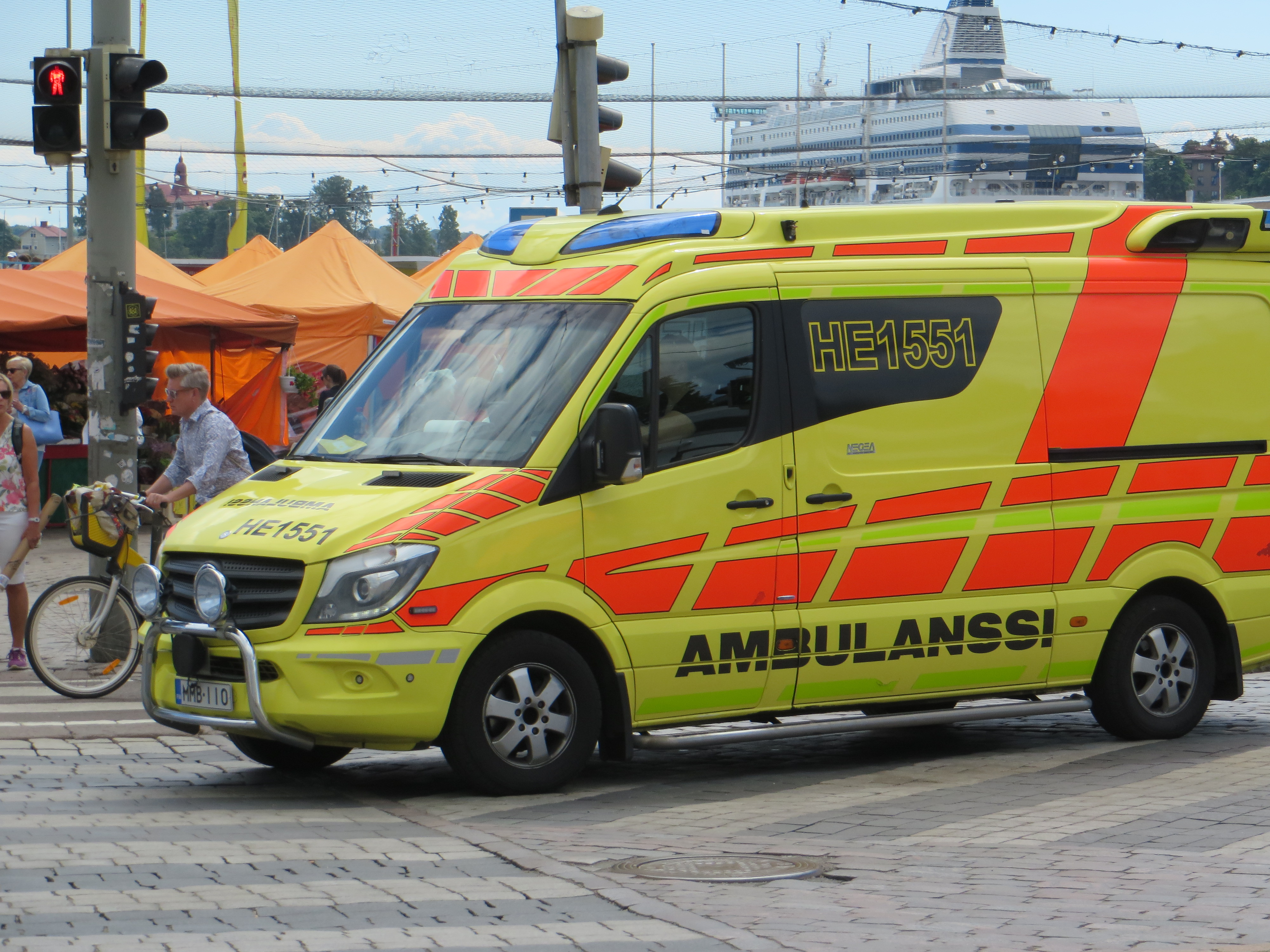
An ambulance in Finland

Emergency medical services in Finland (staggered primary care system) are service networks designed to assist patients with acute health problems. Patients are first sent to an Emergency Centre, where a thorough assessment is conducted to determine the severity of the patients' illness or disability. Medical treatment is then administered accordingly. After the tests and treatment are carried out by emergency staff, an assessment is made as to whether the patient needs further aid at a hospital. If necessary, the patient is directed to an appropriate emergency care unit.

Medical services are organised under the Six Step Framework of care, which includes:

1. The Emergency Response Center
2. First response
3. Basic level
4. Care Level
5. Emergency Doctor/Physician
6. Emergency Department

The emergency access number for the police, rescue, and fire departments in Finland is 112.

== Patient care ==
Patient care progresses through each level of the Six Step Framework of care. Based on the risk assessment of the Emergency Response Center, a basic or therapeutic unit can be provided by a single or multiple-level unit.

== Medical service worker training ==
Each medical service worker completes both basic training and a periodic quality test to ensure quality care delivery within the Six Step Framework of care. Medical service workers progress in their careers to a higher complexity level of care that correlates with the next unit of the Six Step Framework of care. Those medical services workers who are accepted to practice at a higher-level unit may choose to work in a lower-level unit, but as a rule, medical services workers who have passed quality tests at a lower level may not work in higher-level units.

For example, an approved Basic-level medical services worker cannot provide medical services at the Care level.
