= Public utility model =

System for providing emergency medical services

Public Utility Model (PUM), is an emergency medical service (EMS) system. In a Public Utility Model system, the government is a "purchaser" of dispatchers, emergency medical technicians (EMTs) and paramedic providers from an EMS provider (contractor). In most cases, this is a private (for-profit) ambulance company. In the ownership of a Public Utility Model, the community retains control of EMS system capital assets and accounts receivable through daily oversight. The EMS provider (contractor) manages the day-to-day operations of the service and provides the system with properly trained providers.

The system is designed whereas the government not only regulates and oversees system performance, but the ambulance service contractor is held accountable to meet or exceed performance requirements. These requirements include, but not limited to, time constraints. Such limits are set to ensure an ambulance arrives to life-threatening emergencies without delay. The contractors failure in fulfilling the contractual obligations can result in fines being imposed, up to and including termination of contract. The agreement and contract between government and contractor are done through a competitive bidding process. This insures that the most cost-effective provision of EMS services is guaranteed.

== History ==
Around 1983 Jack Stout proposed System Status Management in the Denver City and County EMS system. Soon after, he proposed, or was instrumental in developing Public Utility Models, EMS Performance Contracts, and helped design the very first Computer Aided Dispatch (CAD) system, specific to EMS needs. This gave communities the ability to monitor and measure the performance of their EMS providers (spurring continuous quality improvement and accountability). From this the response time standards were developed that most PUM's use.

== Public utility models in USA ==
Public Utility Models are typically serviced by contract between a private ambulance supplier and the cities they service.

== Distinguishing characteristics ==
Public Utility Model EMS systems have certain characteristics which make it different from other emergency medical services delivery models. They are:

=== Oversight ===
There must be a governmental oversight agency which coordinates the provision of emergency medical services throughout the entire service area. These are usually boards made up of stakeholders in an EMS system (citizens, elected/appointed government officials, physicians, paramedics, nurses, financial gurus, and even consumer advocates)

=== Patient care ===
High quality patient care is the number one focus of a public utility model EMS service. Continuous quality improvement is paramount, and every aspect of the EMS delivery process is examined and re-examined exhaustively in a never-ending cycle.

=== Performance-based contracts ===
Services are provided by contractors who are under "performance-based" agreements. These types of arrangements require results be achieved using the creativity and innovative methods of the providers. There are performance benchmarks established for dispatchers, unit response times.

=== Financial control ===
Financial controls must be in place where the public utility model oversight authority controls all EMS system funding. A public utility model is designed to be funded through the collection of user fees and not reliance on tax money. While some systems struggle with reimbursement issues, the fact remains that a substantial portion of PUM operating revenues are derived from user fees not tax subsidy.

=== Response level ===
Advanced Life Support (ALS) resources are sent to all calls - there may be a tiered response with a local fire department providing BLS first response via an engine or truck company, but the level of transporting care is always ALS and always at the paramedic level.

Purists will argue, with merit, that a true PUM must encompass all five of these hallmarks. However, many existing PUM operations are a hybrid of a simple third-service EMS organization utilizing one or more of the above listed characteristics in an effort to provide the best advanced life support patient care possible.

== System Status Management ==
System Status Management or (SSM) is the most widely accepted method for managing ambulance/EMS resources in the PUM environment. SSM has two dominant components:

=== Dynamic deployment ===
Ambulances are geographically deployed based on projected demand by the time of day and day of week by using historic demand data. This model responds to the fact that as populations move from home to work and back, geographic demand patterns vary. Using SSM, ambulances do not respond from fixed stations, but are "posted" to street corners on an hour to hour basis. The "posts" are selected to provide the best response times for the projected demand at that time of day.

=== Peak demand staffing ===
Shift schedules are designed to provide the number of ambulances needed for the time of day and day of week projected demand. Consequently, in a typical PUM EMS provider system, ambulances typically begin duty every hour from 5:00 a.m. until noon and then the numbers start declining about 5:00 p.m. until midnight. Shift lengths are typically 8, 9, 10, 11, 12 and 24 hours in a large and busy system.

SSM enables a public utility model EMS contractor to match resources to demand more accurately than using a more traditional 'static' model of fixed staffing and fixed stations for all hours of the day and days of the week.

== Current Public Utility Model EMS Systems in United States ==
- RAA (Richmond, VA.)
- EMSA (Oklahoma City, Tulsa and surrounding areas)
- Medstar(Fort Worth, Tx.)
- MEMS (Little Rock & Surrounding, Arkansas)
- Sunstar Paramedics (Pinellas County, Florida)
- MEDIC (Charlotte, North Carolina) & (Mecklenburg County, NC)
- TRAA (Fort Wayne, IN)
- Galveston Area Ambulance Authority (Galveston County, Texas)

== See also ==
- COVID-19

== Other References ==
Fitch, Joseph J.; Prehospital Care Administration ISBN 0-8151-3391-X "Public utility model EMS." Emerg Med Serv. 2004 Mar;33(3):87-91 (Dean S.) University of Maryland, Baltimore County, Emergency Health Services Department, USA. PMID 15055076
