= Emergency Medical Services Organization of Iran =

Government agency of Iran

Emergency Medical Services of Iran
- سازمان اورژانس کشور
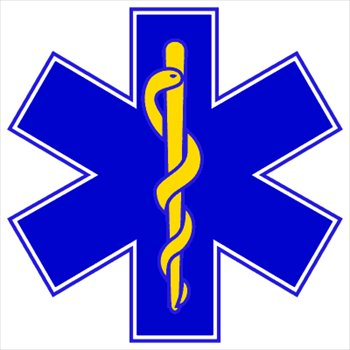
- Emblem of the Emergency Medical Services of Iran
- Formation: 1975
- Type: Government agency
- Legal status: Active
- Purpose: Provide nationwide emergency medical and ambulance services
- Headquarters: Tehran, Iran
- Region served: Iran
- Leader: Jafar Miadfar
- Parent organization: Ministry of Health and Medical Education
- Website: www.115.ir

Emergency Medical Services of Iran (Persian: سازمان اورژانس کشور), also known by its emergency number 115, is a government agency under the Ministry of Health and Medical Education. It coordinates nationwide pre hospital emergency medical services, including ambulance and air ambulance operations.

== History ==
On 5 December 1974, the ceiling of a terminal hall at Tehran’s Mehrabad Airport collapsed after a jet aircraft engine test, resulting in 16 deaths and 11 injuries. This tragedy, along with the lack of pre hospital medical rescue capability, prompted a royal decree by Mohammad Reza Pahlavi to create a free national EMS system.

In early 1975, a delegation of Iranian physicians visited Texas, USA, to study American EMS systems. They returned with training from paramedics Jim Patterson and Max, and established a six-month training course for emergency technicians.

Official operations began in 1975 in Tehran under the name Emergency Information Center 123, with 30 trained technicians and 20 modular ambulances. Services soon expanded to provincial cities.

In 1978 the number was changed from 123 to 115 to reduce misdials. Iran thus became the fourth country in the world, after the US, Canada, and Australia, with an integrated pre hospital EMS.

== Functions and Services ==
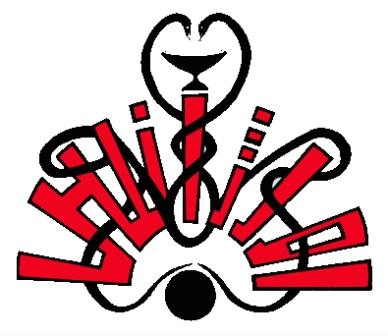
The First logo

The EMS of Iran is responsible for policy making, planning, organizing, coordinating, and managing emergency medical responses. It oversees national operations from risk prevention to disaster response and post-crisis recovery.

=== Emergency Number and Calls ===
In Tehran, 2019 data showed an average of 13,000 calls per day, with about 5,500 dispatches. Approximately 25% of incoming calls were prank calls or resolved via telephone advice without a dispatch.

=== Ambulance Servicfires ===
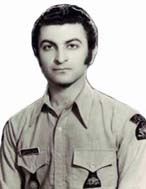
First Uniforms

By 2018, the EMS had a fleet of 4,500 conventional ambulances serving the nation.

=== Motorlance ===
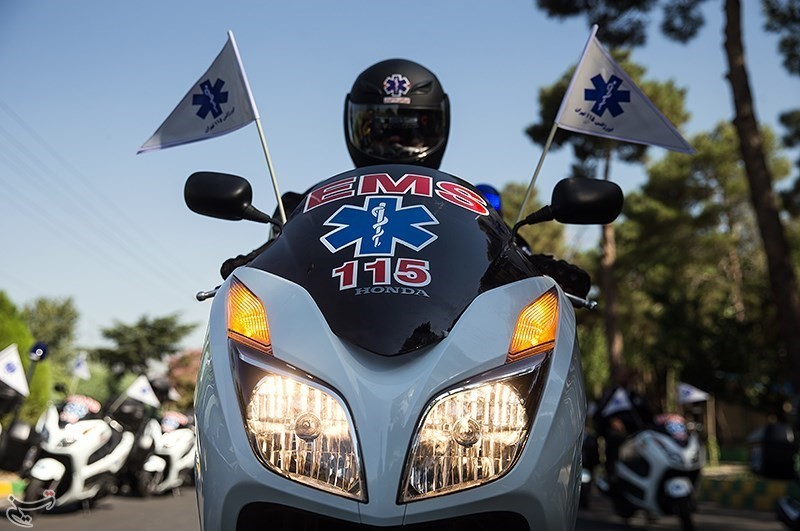
Ambulance motorcycles of Tehran 2

To improve response times in congested cities, as of 2019 over 500 motorcycle ambulances were in service.

=== Air Ambulance ===
The agency operates a fleet of 42 emergency medical helicopters .

=== Rail Ambulance ===
Launched in September 2019, EMS trains began providing onboard pre-hospital services, and plans were announced to add hospital wagons for disaster response.

=== Marine Ambulance ===
EMS support includes two rescue boats for operations on Iran’s southern coasts.

=== Emergency Bases ===
By 2020, the EMS had established 2,190 bases nationwide covering urban, road, air, rail, and marine emergency units.

=== Mobile App ===
The 115 mobile application enables users to receive alerts, incident info, and access self-care guidance.

== Controversies and Misuse ==
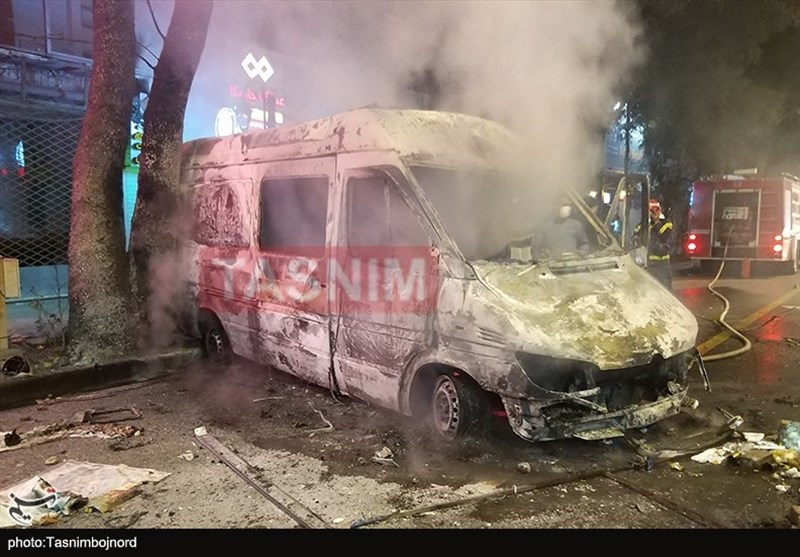
Ambulance destroyed after security forces used it to transport troops and detainees by protesters

During the 2022–2023 protests following the death of Mahsa Amini, security forces were accused of using ambulances inappropriately to transport detainees, arrest protesters, and even fire weapons resulting in damage to EMS vehicles and eroding public trust.

== See also ==
- Emergency medical services in Iran
- Ambulance
- Emergency medicine
- Iranian Red Crescent Society
