= Umbilical line =

Umbilical Line
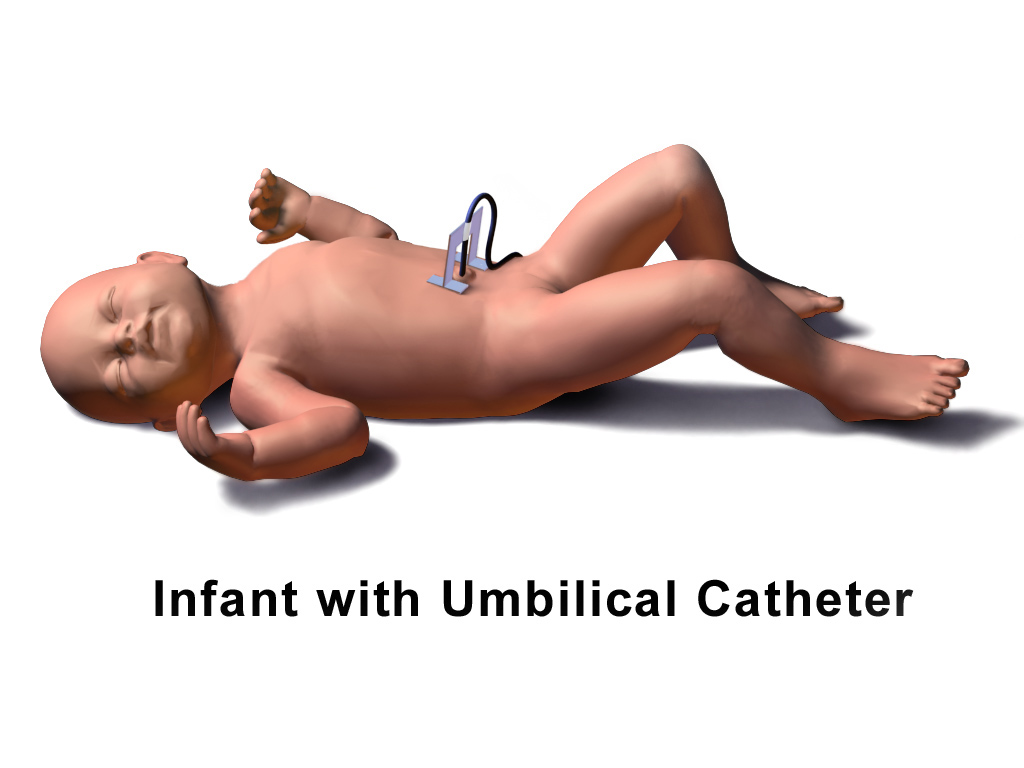
- Specialty: Neonatology

An umbilical line is a catheter that is inserted into one of the two arteries or the vein of the umbilical cord. Generally the UAC/UVC (Umbilical Artery Catheter/Umbilical Vein Catheter) is used in Neonatal Intensive Care Units (NICU) as it provides quick access to the central circulation of premature infants. UAC/UVC lines can be placed at the time of birth and allow medical staff to quickly infuse fluids, inotropic drugs, and blood if required. It is sometimes used in term or near-term newborns in whom the umbilical cord stump is still connected to the circulatory system. Medications, fluids, and blood can be given through this catheter and it allows monitoring of blood gasses and withdrawing of blood samples. Transumbilical catheter intervention is also a method of gaining access to the heart, for example to surgically correct a patent ductus arteriosus.

== Complications ==
The complications of umbilical lines are similar to those of central venous catheters mainly infections such as neonatal sepsis and thrombosis. The most common organisms causing these infections are coagulase negative staphylococci such as staphylococcus epidermidis To avoid catheter-related bloodstream infections checklists and care bundles focused on strict hygiene routines are often recommended.

== Umbilical arterial catheter ==
The position of an umbilical arterial catheter is confirmed on plain film. From the umbilicus, the umbilical arterial catheter dives inferiorly and joins the right or left internal iliac artery before turning superiorly to the common iliac artery and aorta. Appropriate positioning of the catheter tip can be either 'high' or 'low.' The high range is judged relative to thoracic vertebra, and is between T6 and T10, to avoid major aortic branches. The low range is relative to lumbar vertebra, and is between L3 and L5. The lower position may be associated with a higher rate of vascular complications such as thrombosis or vasospasm.

== Umbilical venous catheter ==
Anomalous positioning of the umbilical venous catheter occurs frequently because it is usually inserted without imaging guidance, and confirmed after placement on subsequent plain film, occurring in approximately 50% of first attempts. From the umbilical vein at the umbilicus, the catheter curves superiorly and to the right, joining the left portal vein, passing through the patent ductus venosus to the inferior vena cava and right atrium. Appropriate UVC tip position is in the high inferior vena cava to the low right atrium, typically within 1 cm of the diaphragm. If the UVC tip is proximal to ductus venosus it can lead to administration of intravenous fluids into the portal system, with potential portal vein thrombosis, or, in cases of TPN administration, a TPN abscess.
