= Jumbulance =

British charitable organisation

Jumbulance Trust
- Company type: Charitable organisation
- Industry: Holidays
- Predecessor: New Jumbulance Travel Trust
- Headquarters: Wheathampstead, United Kingdom
- Website: www.jumbulance.org.uk

The Jumbulance Trust is a charitable organisation in the United Kingdom that transports sick and disabled people for holidays and pilgrimages on ambulance buses. The concept was devised by Richard Glitheroe and his wife, a hospice doctor, as a means of conveying sick and disabled people on pilgrimage to the Sanctuary of Our Lady of Lourdes in France.

Its ambulance buses are named Jumbulances, and are based upon luxury coaches with facilities such as platform lifts, medical supplies, on-board toilets, and space for stretcher beds and wheelchairs.
