= Emergency medical services in Ukraine =

In Ukraine, emergency medical services are provided by the Ukrainian Emergency Medical Services (UEMS), a special type of government rescue service, the main task of which is to provide free of charge medical assistance to victims, rescuers and any other persons who take part in the response to and/or recovery process after incidents of any kind.

Ukrainian Emergency Medical Service (UEMS) is a state service, that functions at both a national level (central level) and regional level.

The national level is represented by the Ministry of Health of Ukraine and the Ukrainian national disaster and emergency medicine centre. At the Regional level there are 24 regional centres (one for each oblast) and a further special regional centre for the Autonomous Republic of Crimea. There are additional municipal command posts in the autonomous cities of Kyiv and Sevastopol.

== Main tasks of the emergency medical services ==
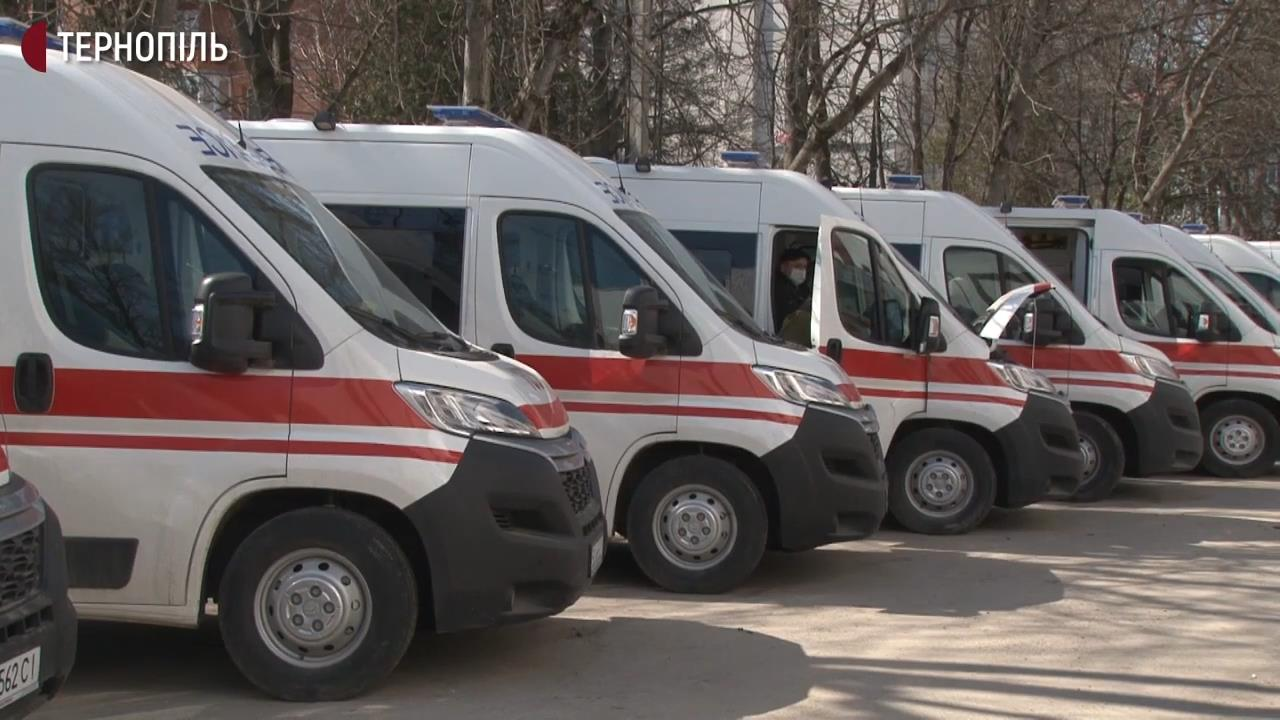
New ambulances in Ternopil in 2020

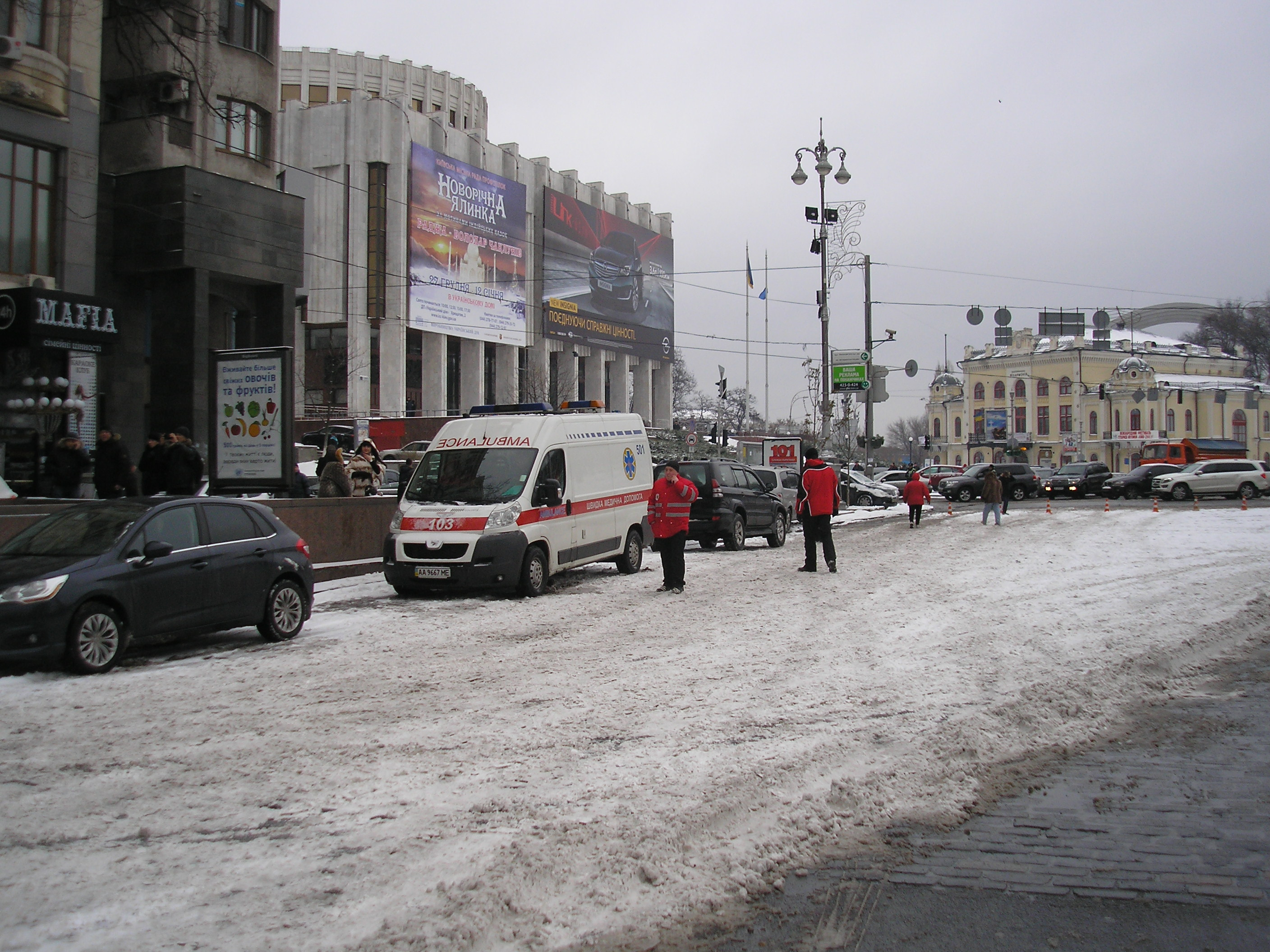
An ambulance in Kyiv during Euromaidan in 2013

The main task of the UEMS is to provide first aid and advanced medical assistance through provision of ambulances at any incident where medical care is required. In the case of a large scale disaster, supplementary help can be provided in the form of a mobile hospital of State Emergency Service of Ukraine (MNS). Additionally, the UEMS has the option to request support from private aircraft or those in use by the State Emergency Service, Ministry of Defence and/or any other government agency.

Ultimately the emergency medical services of Ukraine seek to provide:

- Emergency care for injured and victims after any incident.
- Management and provision of infection control and anti-epidemic work in any given disaster area.
- Sharing and analysis of information about the medical and social consequences of a disaster.
- Responsibility for health of Search and Rescue team members and other medical personnel.
- Creation of and rational use of reserves of resources.
- Researching scientific problems of disaster and emergency medicine.
- Training medical professionals to provide sophisticated medical aid after an incident, with limited recourses.

== Structure of the UEMS ==
The emergency services act according to Response plans that have been composed for each level. The coordination function of the UEMS is provided by coordinating commissions; such commissions exist at both the central level in the system of Ministry of Health at territorial level.

Commissions have coordinated:

- Composition and order of using medical personnel and resources for disaster response.
- Planning for medical response to major incidents.
- Finding ways to improve the functioning of the UEMS.
- Training programs for personnel of the UEMS.
- Coordination and creation of reserves, medical and material and technical resources.

For assistance to victims the UEMS utilises medical teams at local hospitals such as:

- EMS (ambulance) teams.
- Urgent medicare teams in hospitals with trauma units.
- Specialised medical teams of permanent readiness and teams of urgent medicare at dedicated centres.

== International missions ==
UEMS personnel have been deployed as part of Ukrainian joint teams in response to:

- 1999 İzmit earthquake
- 2001 Gujarat earthquake
- 2003 Bam earthquake
- 2005 Kashmir earthquake
