= Ski patrol =

Services for the injured in ski area boundaries

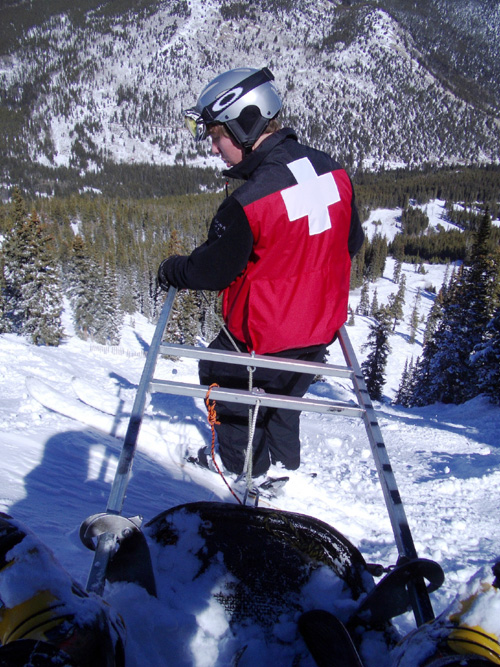
U.S. ski patroller with toboggan in tow

Ski patrols are organizations that provide medical, rescue, and hazard prevention services to the injured in ski area boundaries, or sometimes beyond into backcountry settings. Many have technical-medical certifications, such as Outdoor Emergency Care (OEC) provided by the National Ski Patrol (USA), that are specific to the winter-season environment and providing emergency medical services in remote locations. Many patrollers also hold EMS issued credentials, such as emergency medical technician or any other pre-hospital care certification. Due to the remote location and terrain, transportation is often limited to rescue toboggan, snowmobile, or, for life-compromising injuries or extremely remote terrain, helicopter rescue. Depending on the ski area terrain, ski patrollers can be versed in a large variety of specialized rescues, such as avalanche search and rescue, outdoor emergency transportation, chairlift evacuation, and, in some cases, helicopter rescue techniques are taught. Patrols work to promote ski safety, enforce area policies (where applicable), and help the injured within their jurisdiction. Ski patrollers also work to set up the mountain before it opens by conducting trail checks, providing avalanche control work, and setting up necessary equipment in preparation for the day. At the end of the day, they also conduct a sweep clearing the mountain for off-hours.

Contrary to the name's implications, ski patrollers can be snowboarders in addition to alpine, Nordic, or telemark skiers. Many patrols also have non-skiing positions whereby patrollers no longer able to ski or individuals lacking sufficient skiing or toboggan handling skills can still provide emergency care in a first aid room. Some ski areas also have a junior ski patrol program in which teenagers between the ages of 15 and 17 years old can participate. Most junior ski patrol programs limit the responsibilities of their members, such as preventing them from running toboggans or administering first aid without supervision. However, there are some areas with junior ski patrol programs which allow their members to operate with the same responsibilities as the rest of the patrol, after meeting the same standard in each skill category as other patrollers.

== Fédération internationale des patrouilles de ski ==
The Fédération internationale des patrouilles de ski (FIPS) is the international organisation representing ski patrol and associated ski safety organisations with membership from throughout the world. These patrol and safety organisations comprise full-time and volunteer ski patrollers, doctors, lawyers, engineers, technicians, ski equipment instructors, and ski area managers, who are involved in the multi-disciplinary activities of ski patrolling and safety.

Member countries of FIPS are Australia, Argentina, Canada, Chile, Finland, France, Italy, Japan, Korea, New Zealand, Norway, Romania, Russia, Scotland (UK), Serbia, Sweden, Switzerland, USA. In addition, there are a number of Associate Members who are non-national organisations.

The concept of FIPS can be traced back prior to 1979 when the first meeting was held in Calgary, Canada. Although there were many ski patrols in existence at that time, there was very little communication between them. Patrollers who had the opportunity to ski in other countries noticed differences and some commonality in procedures and standards relative to their own. In addition, accident prevention programmes were being implemented in some countries but not in others. A number of countries did not have a national ski patrol organisation.

FIPS was created as the world forum for ski patrollers to meet, exchange ideas and compare the latest in patrol techniques on a regular basis. FIPS is supported by national patrol organisations to provide the necessary input and to offer potential solutions to patrolling issues. To enable this collaboration FIPS holds a congress every two years in a location of a member nation.

FIPS exists due to the combined efforts of interested patrollers, individual ski patrols and national patrol organisations. FIPS seeks to improve the effectiveness of ski patrolling and, in turn, benefit the snow sports public. Over the years FIPS has initiated a number of specific projects of interest to patrollers:

- Issues of legal aspects of ski patrolling
- Investigation of injuries to ski patrollers while on patrol
- Documentation of member country's training, qualification and recognition together with comparison of the training modules
- Recommendations of medical approaches to some specific ski injuries
- Consideration of a standard Skiers Responsibility Code (safety rules)
- Establishment and maintenance of the FIPS web site
- Evaluation of relevant technology and its impact on ski patrol rescue, and safety of the skiing public

== First Aid Committee – 1933 ==
In 1933 the Schenectady (New York) Wintersports Club was organizing Snow Trains for local skiers to go to the Gore Mountain-Pete Gay Massif above North Creek, New York to enjoy skiing on trails cut by local sports enthusiasts as well as from Schenectady. Because of tales learned of injured skiers on the early (1931) Boston to New Hampshire (Franconia) Snow Trains, the organizers decided to have a large and well prepared First Aid Committee. Headed by Lois Perret (Schaefer), RN, and aided by expert skiers from the Schenectady Wintersports Club, as well as North Creek High School students, a course on first aid and ski related injuries was taught to several dozen recruits. The Snow Trains were delayed because of a lack of snow in 1933/1934, but sufficient snow cover was achieved late, and the first Snow Train reached North Creek March 4, 1934. The First Aid Committee swung into action, sweeping trails for skiers needing assistance. The train acted as a base camp on the siding during the day. While no injuries were treated on that first trip, the First Aid Committee (AKA Ski Patrol) continued active participation on trains reaching North Creek during the pre-war years. They were assisted by a "physician-on-call," Dr. James Glenn, a family physician and skier who practiced in North Creek. The First Aid Committee of 1933 anticipated the much needed assistance pioneered by Minnie Dole five (5) years later in conjunction with care for injured ski racers who were pushing limits of speed and technique. The first ski patrol was about helping mountainside injuries to regular ski enthusiasts—not racers.

== National Ski Patrol ==
The National Ski Patrol in USA was founded in 1938 by the NSP's first chairman, Charles Minot Dole. "Minnie," as he was known, decided that a "service and safety" organization was in order after he hurt himself skiing at Stowe, Vermont and had trouble evacuating himself from the slope. He created the Mount Mansfield Ski Patrol for the National Downhill and Slalom Championship at Mt. Mansfield. Roger F. Langley, the president of the National Ski Association asked Dole to consider a national patrol. Dole later went on to create the 10th Mountain Division, after seeing Finnish soldiers on skis destroy two armored divisions. One of the few federally chartered not-for-profit organizations in the U.S., the NSP has since become the world's largest winter rescue organization. The NSP's 26,500 paid and volunteer members serve on over 600 patrols. In conjunction with the development of the Nation's First Volunteer Ski Patrol at Stowe, Cannon Mountain, in Franconia NH, had developed the Nation's first Professional Ski Patrol, also in 1938.

The NSP is composed of 10 geographic divisions plus a single division for all paid patrollers. Members are recognized on the slopes by the red jackets they wear, marked by a white cross on the chest and a larger one on the back, or by the older style of blue and rust colored parkas with yellow crosses.

=== Merits, Awards and Ranking ===
The levels of the National Ski Patrol are

1. Patroller- work on alpine skis, snowboards, Nordic skis and bikes. Receive medical training which allows them to work in first aid rooms and to transport patients.
2. Alpine Patroller
3. Senior
4. Certified

There are also levels of personal achievement given to a Ski Patroller who goes beyond the call of duty is awarded the Yellow Merit Star. The highest Honor of the National Ski Patrol is the Purple merit star, this is awarded for saving a life.

=== Additional Programs ===
National Ski Patrol has an ongoing education system which includes OEC refreshers, and OEC classes.

The NSP also offers a Certified Program that enables patrollers to build upon their existing skills and experiences.

The Certified Program includes six modules, such as:

1. Area operations and risk management
2. Avalanche management
3. Emergency care
4. Lift evacuation and rope knowledge
5. Skiing/ Snowboarding
6. Toboggan handling

Over the course of its history, the NSP has helped to develop similar patrol organizations in Canada, New Zealand, Australia, Argentina, Chile, Israel, Turkey and Korea.

== Canadian Ski Patrol ==
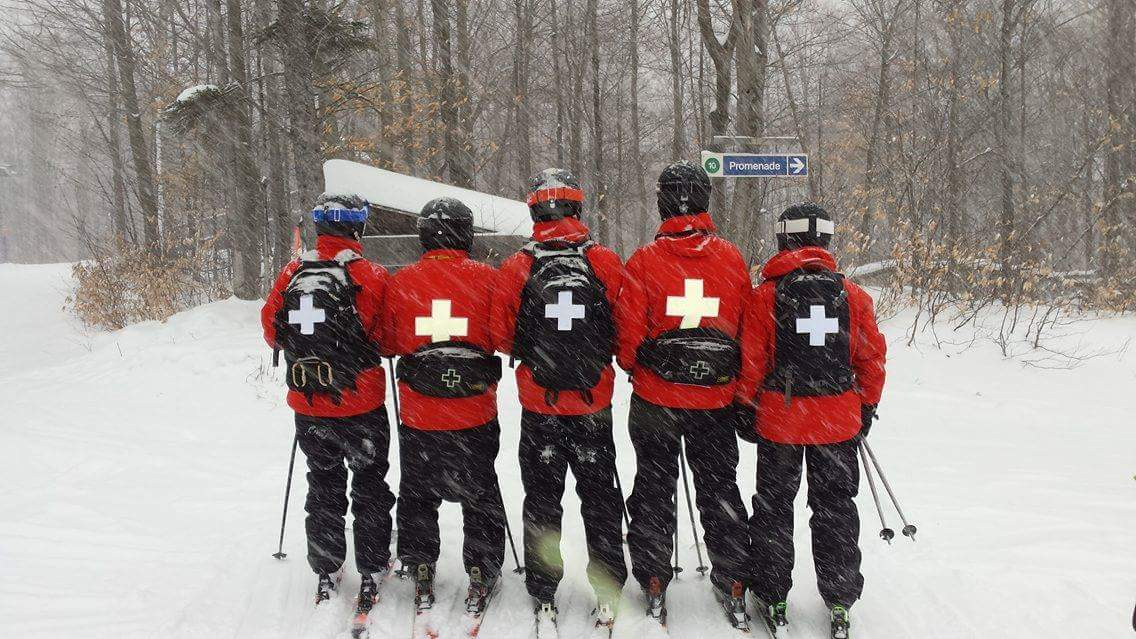
Canadian Ski Patrol volunteers at Ski Montcalm in Rawdon, Quebec

The Canadian Ski Patrol is the patrol governing body for Canada.

In 1940, Dr. Douglas Firth was asked by the Canadian Amateur Ski Association (CASA) to organize and train a first aid rescue group to patrol the ski hills. The Canadian Ski Patrol System was originally a standing committee of the CASA with independent patrols in different areas. During the years between 1941 and 1948, the war restricted expansion, but the Toronto and Montreal Patrols united to form the nucleus of a national organization. During the next five years, the System expanded in Ontario, Quebec and the Vancouver area.

The founder and President of the Quebec area was led by James Harold Millard, a resident of Montreal and Morin Heights. Harold became National Chairman for Canada, following Dr Firth. In the early years, those who were injured were taken down the hill on a toboggan where they were then loaded onto the train for transportation to Montreal for medical care. Many photos of the original patrol in Quebec were turned over to the CSPS in the late 90s for their archives. The family tradition continued when both Harold's daughter-in-law and grandson were members of the CSPS in Ontario and Alberta.

By 2004, the Canadian Ski Patrol had 5,000 members across Canada.

The CSP is composed of nine geographic divisions, each further divided into zones. The largest zone is Central Zone, within Ontario Division, with 575 patrollers as of 2017.

While some resorts or zones specify their own uniforms, the official Alpine uniform is defined as a jacket that is "...red with the proper markings. These markings will include a white cross on the back, a white cross on both upper arms and an optional white cross on the breast." The yellow and blue uniform was retired in 2016, and will be fully phased out by 2020.

== See also ==
- Emergency medical technician
- Lifeguard
- Mountain rescue
- Wilderness first aid
