= Roland Palmedo =

American ski industry pioneer (1895–1977)

- Born: 5 April 1895; Brooklyn, New York
- Died: March 15, 1977 (aged 81); Williamstown, Massachusetts
- Education: Williams College (1917)
- Occupations: investment banker, businessman
- Known for: Stowe chairlift, Mad River Glen founder
- Awards: National Ski Hall of Fame (1968)

Roland Palmedo (April 5, 1895 – March 15, 1977) was a pioneering developer of recreational skiing in the United States. He founded the Mount Mansfield Lift Company which built Stowe's first chairlift, and created the Mad River Glen ski area. Roland Palmedo was also instrumental in the establishment of the National Ski Patrol and the first women's U.S. Olympic ski team. As founding president of the Amateur Ski Club of New York, Palmedo promoted skiing as an outdoor adventure for families and competitive racers alike.

Parallel to his ventures in skiing, Roland Palmedo worked as an underwriter at Lehman Brothers. He channeled his experience as a naval aviator in World War I to becoming Robert Lehman's point man for investments in the early aviation industry, including corporations that were to become Pan American Airways, American Airways and Trans World Airlines.

== Life and career ==
After graduating from public schools in Montclair, New Jersey, in 1912, Palmedo set off on a "wanderjahr", exploring Europe by bicycle. His visit to relatives in the Bavarian town of Garmisch-Partenkirchen began a lifelong love of hiking, skiing and outdoor adventure. In the fall of 1913 he entered Williams College and that winter joined the ski team. Palmedo was also one of the founders and the first president of the Williams Outing Club, created in 1915 and modeled after the Dartmouth Outing Club.

In the spring of 1917 when Palmedo was to graduate from Williams College, the United States Congress declared war on Germany. He enlisted with the Naval Air Force upon graduation and served as a naval aviator in World War I. In 1920 he returned to civilian life and became an underwriter at Lehman Brothers. In 1927, a month after Charles Lindbergh's solo crossing of the Atlantic, Palmedo worked with Robert Lehman to structure financing for Juan Trippe's precursor to Pan American Airways. In 1929, Palmedo also worked with Averell Harriman to create the Aviation Corporation of America, which conglomerated fledgling airlines and support companies into one entity that would accelerate commercial aviation research and manufacturing. In January 1930, that company spun off Colonial and Universal Air Lines, which later merged to form American Airlines. Through his work as an investment banker, Roland Palmedo would eventually serve as director on the boards of the Lehman Corporation, Pan American Airlines, Trans World Airlines and the Libby-Owens-Ford Glass Company.

After the Japanese bombed Pearl Harbor, Palmedo once again enlisted into the Naval Air Force in 1942. He became the aide to Vice-Admiral Patrick N. L. Bellinger, Commander of the Naval Air Force Atlantic Fleet, and then served on the aircraft carrier USS Yorktown (CV-10) as lieutenant commander.

== The Amateur Ski Club of New York ==
During the 1920s when winters in New England had no plowed roads and little accommodation, Palmedo would join friends from New York City on skiing expeditions to snowy trails and logging roads in the Berkshire mountains and Vermont. In 1931, he met with friends to discuss how to organize their trips more effectively, establishing the Amateur Ski Club of New York. Soon the club was publishing a bulletin with practical information about destinations and ski conditions. Club members would go on to support Palmedo's leadership in developing the ski areas at Stowe and Mad River Glen, as well as organizing the National Ski Patrol, and sponsoring the first U.S. Women's Olympic Ski Team.

The club awarded honorary memberships to Palmedo's friends in Europe who were also early promoters of the sport, such as famed ski instructor Hannes Schneider and slalom inventor Arnold Lunn. When Schneider was jailed in 1938 for his outspoken criticism of Nazi Germany, Palmedo organized club members to gather several hundred signatures to petition his release.

== Stowe ==
In search of more skiable terrain, Palmedo wrote a letter in 1931 addressed simply to the "Postmaster, Stowe Vermont", inquiring about winter accommodation and accessibility of the toll road on Mount Mansfield. Secretary of the Stowe Civic Club, C. C. Stafford, offered a welcoming reply. The following February Palmedo and Jose Machado Jr. set off for Mount Mansfield, which they climbed with seal skins strapped to their skis. Upon their return to New York, Palmedo shared his experience with the skiing community in an article in Ski Bulletin, writing "a week or ten days could be spent at Stowe and a different trip or circuit taken each day…" The next year, with Palmedo's encouragement, Craig Burt, Abner Coleman, and Charles Lord organized the Civilian Conservation Corps to cut the first trails on the mountain.

When the National Downhill Championships were held at Stowe in 1938, skiers had to walk down an unplowed road to the base, and then hike further to the top of the Nose Dive trail. That year's downhill champion, Grace Carter Lindley, and Roland Palmedo agreed that it was time to introduce Americans to the kind of European experience of trains and surface tows that lifted skiers to snowy peaks. Palmedo gathered investors in the Mt. Mansfield Lift Company to build a chairlift to rival the world's first, which had appeared in Sun Valley two years earlier. Stowe area skiers like Sepp Ruschp, Charles Lord, and Gale Shaw invested, as well as Amateur Ski Club of New York members Godfrey Rockefeller and Lowell Thomas. Because the mountain was owned by the State of Vermont and prohibited private use, the company arranged to donate the lift in exchange for the right to lease it back for ten years. On December 9, 1940, the longest chairlift in the world at the time officially opened.

== The National Ski Patrol ==
Roland was impressed by the Swiss Army Rescue Unit that provided aid to injured skiers at the Parsenn resort in Davos, Switzerland, and encouraged something similar at Stowe. When the Mount Mansfield Ski Club was being incorporated in 1934, Palmedo worked with Frank Griffin, Craig Burt and A. B. Coleman to form the Mount Mansfield Ski Patrol, the first such organization in America. Safety protocol became a major concern in 1936 when Frank Edson was skiing in a race organized by the Amateur Ski Club on Pine Mountain in Pittsfield, Massachusetts. Edson crashed into a tree, was carried down in a toboggan in a way that aggravated his punctured lung, and died the next day in the hospital. The day after Edson's death, the Amateur Ski Club officers met in emergency and Palmedo suggested a "general study of safety in skiing". He asked Charles Minot Dole to chair the new Safety Committee. In 1939 the National Ski Patrol was established. Roger Langley was presented with the National Ski Patrol Badge No. 1, Roland Palmedo Badge No. 2 and Charles "Minnie" Dole Badge No. 3.

== Mad River Glen ==
In the 1940s the management of Stowe had become fractured into various groups. The Mt. Mansfield Lift Company ran the chair lift, the State managed the trails, the Mt. Mansfield Hotel Company controlled the Toll House rope tow and ski school, and the Smuggler's Notch Lift Company operated the T-bar. Palmedo lamented the lack of overall vision that resulted in trails resembling a "great gash down the mountainside" and feared a crowded mountain when skiers began arriving by the busload. By 1945, Palmedo was ready to establish a ski area of his own design in contrast to the rapid development he witnessed at Stowe. "I would like to see Vermont ski areas stay as simple and as rustic as possible. I don't think we need to import a lot of plush and sophisticated gimmicks. I am suspicious of man's effort to improve nature. I can't see that ski resorts need belly dancers, discotheques and other side-show attractions."

With help from Stowe partners Charlie Lord, J. Negley Cooke, and Cooke's wife Nancy, Palmedo scouted for an appropriate mountain, often while flying his open cockpit biplane. On January 6, 1947, the Mad River Corporation was formed to develop the privately held Stark Mountain, with Roland Palmedo President, Cooke Vice President, and Charlie Lord General Manager. Palmedo added to the trail design team Bobby Schwartzenbach, a member of the 1938 U.S. Ski Team. Mad River Glen opened December 11, 1948. The base was free of hotels and nightlife, with a single chair ready to carry skiers to narrow trails that ran along the natural contours of the mountain. In 1972 the Mad River Corporation was sold to Trux Pratt and Brad Swett, and later acquired by Pratt's widow Betsy Pratt who maintained the area's rustic charm for more than two decades.

== Legacy ==
Palmedo's original vision of his ideal ski area was echoed in the 1995 charter of the Mad River Glen Cooperative which was created "to forever protect the classic Mad River Glen skiing experience by preserving low skier density, natural terrain and forests, varied trail character, and friendly community atmosphere for the benefit of shareholders, area personnel and patrons." Later the Mad River Glen experience was articulated by a loyal skier's essay which was read ceremoniously at the dismantling of the original single chair lift in 2007. The attraction to Mad River Glen, wrote Michael Boland, "is…the feeling of skiing as a true wilderness experience. Unsullied by money, pretense or pomp. To those of us who know and love it, Mad River is simply the last great place where skiing is stripped to its bare and sublime essence."

Following his death, Palmedo's family donated his library to the National Ski Hall of Fame in Ishpeming, Michigan, where it has become the Roland Palmedo Memorial Library. He is also honored at the Vermont Ski & Snowboard Hall of Fame.

Roland Palmedo's celebration of skiing is also reflected in his books Skiing, the International Sport and Ski New Horizons. On January 1, 2018, the biography Roland Palmedo: A Life of Adventure and Enterprise was officially published.
