= National Ski Hall of Fame =

Hall of Fame in Ishpeming, Michigan

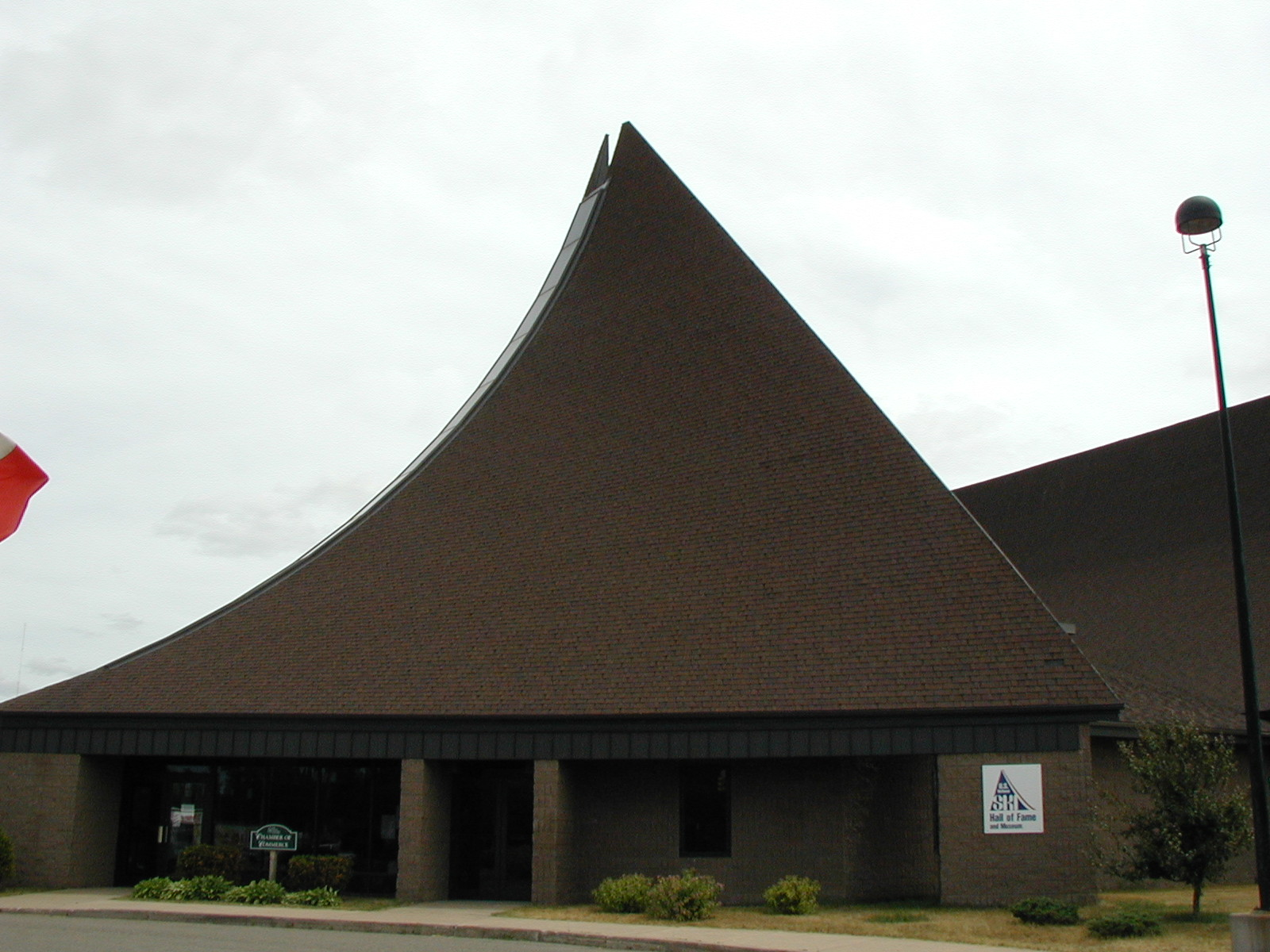
- Side view of building shows its ski jump shape

- Location within Michigan

General information
- Coordinates: 46.503°N 87.6655°W

Website
- www.skihall.com

The U.S. Ski and Snowboard Hall of Fame and Museum is located in Ishpeming, Michigan, the birthplace of organized skiing in the United States. Located in the state's Upper Peninsula, the building includes the hall of fame and museum, as well as a theater, library, gift shop, offices, and ample storage space for archive material and collections. The current building opened in 1992.

== History ==
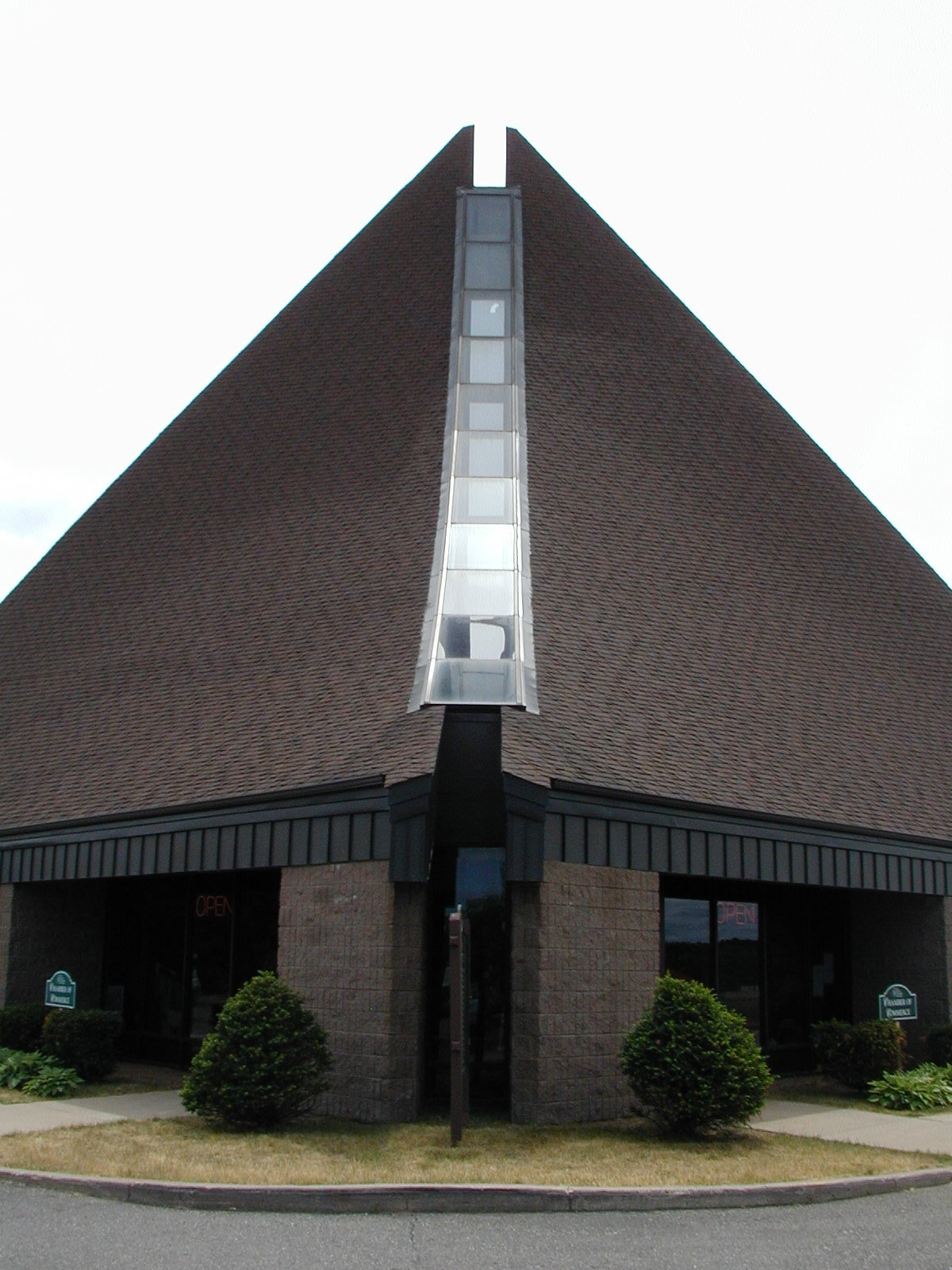
Front view of building

The National Ski Association, now known as U.S. Ski & Snowboard, was formed in Ishpeming in 1905, 121 years ago. It was formed during a meeting of ski clubs from Ishpeming, Minneapolis, Red Wing, Minnesota, and Eau Claire, Wisconsin. Ishpeming Ski Club founder Carl Tellefsen (1854−1908) was its first president, and for his contribution, he was among the first four to be accorded honored membership in the hall of fame in early 1957.

The Roland Palmedo Memorial Library, one of the largest research ski libraries in the United States, is housed here. Roland Palmedo (1895−1977) was a ski-sport builder and contributor for more than 50 years. He helped to organize the National Ski Patrol, the teacher certification program, and various early ski teams and clubs. Palmedo also founded Mad River Glen ski area, edited two skiing books, and developed one of the most extensive ski libraries in America. Following his death, his family donated his library to the National Ski Hall of Fame and Museum where it has become the nucleus for the Roland Palmedo Memorial Library.

== Notable members of the Hall of Fame ==
Name	Inducted
Charles "Minnie" Dole	1958
Roger Langley	1958
Andrea Mead Lawrence	1958
Alec Bright	1959
Dave McCoy	1967
Jill Kinmont Boothe	1967
Sel Hannah	1968
Nancy Greene	1969
Herman Smith-Johannsen	1969
Dick Buek	1974
Tom Corcoran	1978
Joan Hannah	1978
Warren Miller	1978
Howard Head	1979
Bob Beattie	1984
David Bradley	1985
Ernie Blake	1987
Tony Wise	1988
Tommy Moe	2003
Picabo Street	2004
Jonny Moseley	2006
Cary Adgate	2008
Glen Plake	2010
Shane McConkey	2010
Stein Eriksen	2010
Daron Rahlves	2010
Scot Schmidt	2014
Shaun Palmer	2016
