= Alec Bright =

American athlete (1897–1980)

Alexander H. Bright
Personal information
- Born: December 16, 1897 Cambridge, Massachusetts, U.S.
- Died: November 17, 1980 (aged 82) Waltham, Massachusetts, U.S.
- Education: Harvard College
- Occupation: Stockbroker
- Spouse: Clarita Heath (m. 1959)
- Children: 3

Sport
- Sport: Ice hockey Alpine skiing

Alexander Harvey Bright (December 16, 1897 – November 17, 1980) was an American stockbroker and athlete who played college and semipro hockey and was a member of the 1936 United States Olympic ski team.

== Early life ==
Bright was born on December 16, 1897, in Cambridge, Massachusetts. His parents were Elmer H. and Mary (Bill) Bright and he was a descendant of John Stark. He attended the Browne & Nichols School and Harvard College.

== Hockey ==
Bright was a standout player for the Harvard Crimson men's ice hockey team. His hockey career was interrupted by World War I. He was a second lieutenant in the infantry, but did not serve outside the United States. After graduating from Harvard in 1919, Bright played amateur hockey in Boston. He was a member of the Harvard Club during the 1919–20 season. The team folded at the end of the season and Bright and three of his teammates joined the Boston Athletic Association ice hockey team. He returned to the B.A.A. team for the 1921–22 season and from 1922 to 1924 he played for the Boston Hockey Club.

== Business career ==
In 1924, Bright and his brother, Horace, joined their father's stock brokerage firm – Elmer H. Bright & Co. In 1959, the firm merged with Tucker, Anthony & R. L. Day and Bright was a limited partner with that company until his retirement in 1975.

== Skiing ==
Bright was a founding member of the Ski Club Hochgebirge and the Woodstock Ski Runners Club. After seeing Europe's tramways during the 1933 FIS championships, Bright lobbied the American Steel and Wire Company to construct the first aerial tramway in North America at the Cannon Mountain Ski Area. His efforts were successful and on June 17, 1938, the Cannon Mountain Tramway opened to the public.

Bright was a member of the 1936 United States Olympic ski team and competed in the Olympic trials. In 1951, he won the Eastern amateur senior giant slalom championship.

Bright was on the selection committees for the 1940, 1948, and 1952 U.S. Olympic ski teams. He also served a vice president of the National Ski Association and was responsible for many changes in the sport's rules and regulations. He was inducted into the National Ski Hall of Fame in 1959.

== Aviation ==
Bright received his pilot's license in 1927. In 1942, he was appointed to the Massachusetts Aeronautics Commission by Governor Leverett Saltonstall. That May, Bright was commissioned a captain in the United States Army Air Forces. He served as an intelligence officer with the 91st Bombardment Squadron and was a spare gunner on a Boeing B-17 Flying Fortress during the Allied bombing of the Lorient Submarine Base.

== Bright-Landry Hockey Center ==
From 1947 to 1951, Bright was president of the Harvard Varsity Club. With possibility that the Boston Arena would no longer be available for college hockey, he led a fundraising drive for a new Harvard hockey rink and donated $20,288 towards the cause. The new building, initially named the Donald C. Watson Memorial Rink, opened in 1955. In 1978, Bright financed renovations to the rink, which was renamed the Alexander H. Bright Hockey Center on November 19, 1979. In 2013, the arena was renamed the Bright-Landry Hockey Center in recognition of supporter C. Kevin Landry.

== Personal life and death ==
In 1959, Bright married Clarita Heath, a fellow member of the 1936 United States Olympic ski team. They had one son and two daughters and resided in Brookline, Massachusetts. Bright died on November 17, 1980, at a nursing home in Waltham, Massachusetts.
