= Charles Minot =

Charles Minot may refer to:

- Charles Minot (railroad executive) (1810–1866), railroad executive at Erie Railroad
- Charles Minot Dole (1899–1976), founder of the National Ski Patrol
- Charles Sedgwick Minot (1852–1914), American anatomist and founding member of the American Society for Psychical Research
