= National Brotherhood of Skiers =

African American sports non-profit

The National Brotherhood of Snowsports (formerly Skiers) (NBS) is a nonprofit focused on organizing and supporting African American skiers. The NBS comprises dozens of predominantly-black ski clubs in the United States.

== History ==
The NBS was founded by Art Clay and Ben Finley after being introduced to each other by a mutual friend in 1972. The first NBS event was a summit of members of the 13 founding associated clubs in 1973, which became an annual event. That first summit, held at Aspen, is the first known organized gathering of black skiers.

The organization was chartered in 1974 and incorporated in 1975. It is a member of the National Ski Council Federation, an organization formed in 1999 and composed of the largest ski clubs (and groups of ski clubs) in the United States.

REI published a short film about the National Brotherhood of Skiers and its history in 2019, also focusing on the outreach its member clubs do to spread snowsports.

In 2020, co-founders Clay and Finley were set to be the first African Americans inducted into the U.S. Ski and Snowboard Hall of Fame. It was initially planned for late March, but was postponed to December of the same year due to COVID-19. Members of NBS had twice previously submitted Clay and Finley to be inducted, both of which were unsuccessful.

== Summits and events ==
The NBS had its first summit at Aspen in 1973 with 350 participants from 13 clubs. Before the summit, the Colorado National Guard was put on alert and remained on standby during the events.

The summits are held annually, usually lasting about a week, and the location changes from one year to the next.

In 1993, which was one of the largest summits the NBS organized, about 6,000 participants met at Vail Ski Resort in Colorado.

=== 2020 ===
The 2020 summit, held at Sun Valley from February 27 to March 7, consisted of about 600 participants from 51 clubs. More than 100 of those participants, in the few weeks after the event, experienced symptoms of COVID-19. Four participants, as of late April 2020, died from the virus.

Both co-founders, Art Clay and Ben Finley, were among those who tested positive for COVID-19 after the event. Finley spent 3 days in the intensive care unit at UCLA Medical Center with the virus.

Sun Valley ski resort closed on March 15 due to COVID-19, following many other ski resorts in the United States.

=== Local club events ===
Many clubs that are affiliated with the National Brotherhood of Skiers host local events with the goal of encouraging black people to become involved in skiing and snowboarding. Most affiliated clubs plan trips and events each season for their members.

The Boston Ski Party, an affiliated club, hosts multiple annual events including "YouthFest", which brings 140 children to a local ski mountain to introduce them to snowsports.

=== Scholarships ===
On an annual basis, the NBS awards multiple scholarships to young adults in skiing in snowboarding, many of whom compete nationally or internationally. Each year, the NBS runs a fundraiser for its Olympic Scholarship Fund with the goal of an African American skier or snowboarder competing in the Olympics.

== Membership ==
Rather than joining directly, prospective participants in events are required to be a part of a local ski organization affiliated with the NBS.

In the late 1980s and early 1990s, over 80 clubs were members of the NBS, and the 1993 summit saw 6,000 participants. After that period, which REI describes as the organization's heyday, membership and participation in summits and events began to decline. By 2019, club membership had declined to 53 with that year's summit's participation estimated at about 1,000. However, from the period of about 2014 to 2019 membership levels continuously hovered at around 3,500 people.

In terms of demographics, the NBS determined in 2016 that about half of members were over the age of 50.
