= Cannon Mountain Ski Area =

Ski area in New Hampshire, United States

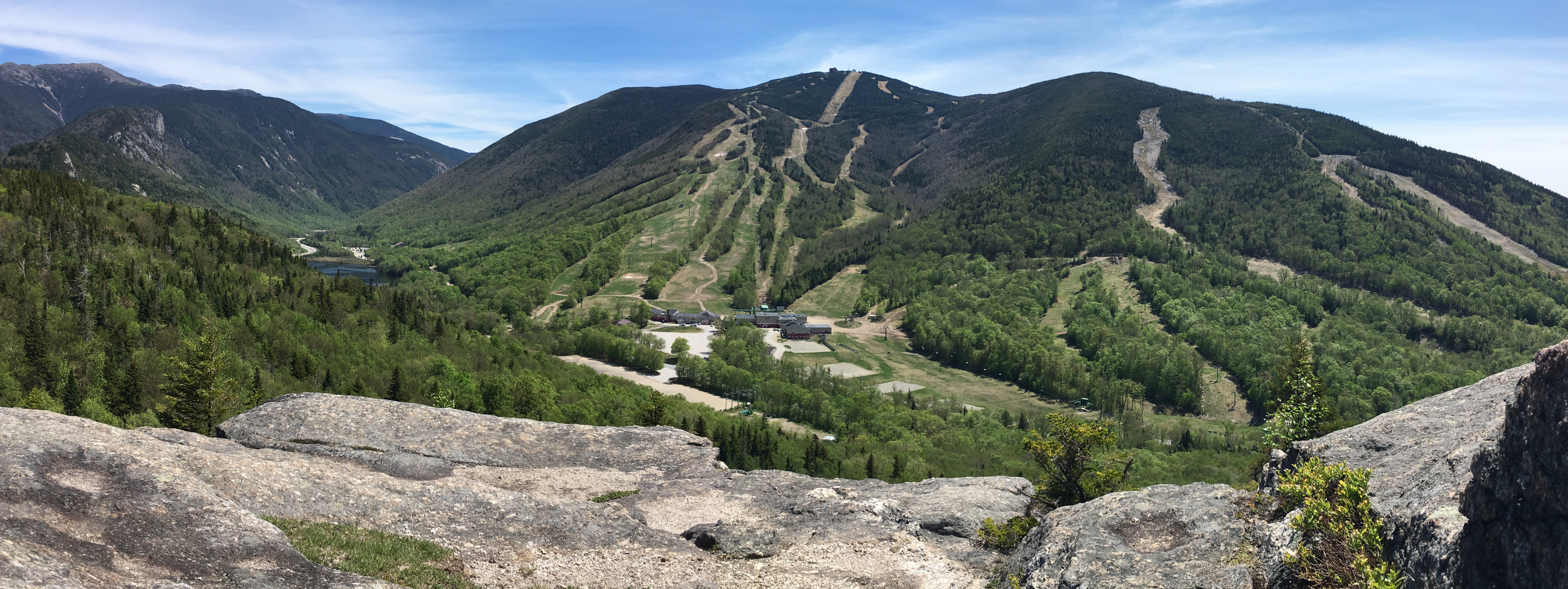
- Cannon Mountain as seen from Bald Mountain

- Location in New Hampshire
- Location: Franconia, New Hampshire, U.S.
- Coordinates: 44°09′28″N 71°41′56″W
- Vertical: 2,230 ft (680 m) Cannon/Mittersill
- Top elevation: 4,080 ft (1,240 m) Cannon
- Base elevation: 1,850 ft (560 m) Mittersill
- Skiable area: 265 acres (107 ha)
- Trails: 73 trails, plus the Mittersill backcountry area (86 acres; 35 ha); 21% Beginner; 47% Intermediate; 32% Expert
- Longest run: 2.3 miles (3.7 km)
- Lift system: 10 total: aerial tram, 1 hi-speed quad, 2 quad chairs, 3 triple chairs, 1 double chair, 1 rope tow, 1 T-bar
- Lift capacity: 11,000 skiers/hour
- Snowfall: 160 inches (4.1 m)
- Snowmaking: 168 acres (68 ha)
- Website: www.cannonmt.com

Cannon Mountain Ski Area is a state-owned ski resort located on Cannon Mountain in the White Mountains of New Hampshire, United States. Cannon is located within Franconia Notch State Park and offers ten lifts servicing 265 acres (1.07 km^{2}) of skiing (168 with snowmaking). Cannon has 23 miles (37 km) of trails and a north-northeast exposure and has the only aerial tram in New Hampshire. Cannon has the largest vertical drop of any ski area in New Hampshire, 2,180 feet (660 m), and is the seventh largest in New England. US Olympic skier Bode Miller grew up skiing at Cannon.

== History ==
Cannon Mountain was the site of the first passenger aerial tramway in North America. From its construction in 1938 to its 1980 retirement, the first tram carried 6,581,338 passengers up the 2.1-mile (3.4 km) route to near the summit of Cannon Mountain. On May 24, 1980, the Cannon Mountain Aerial Tramway II was dedicated. Alexander Bright, a skier involved in developing the sport in the area, conceived the idea of building a tramway in New Hampshire during his trip to Europe as a member of the US Olympic Ski Team in 1933. In Europe, Bright had seen passenger-carrying tramways and recognized that building one in New Hampshire could foster the growth of skiing and summer tourism in the White Mountains. Bright persuaded L.R. Batemen of the American Steel and Wire Company to conduct a preliminary survey to locate a suitable site for a tramway and to estimate construction costs. In November 1933, the first physical survey of Franconia Notch was made by Batemen, E.J. Lloyd and Roland Peabody of Franconia, who was called in as an advisor because of his knowledge of the area and his enthusiasm for recreation development in the White Mountains. Bright's idea appealed to an increasing numbers of people and groups associate with winter sports, and Peabody, through his enthusiasm, aroused the support of the New Hampshire legislature.

In the spring of 1934, after estimating construction costs, completing research on operating costs and potential income, and examining seven promising sites for a tramway, a committee appointed by Governor John G. Winant unanimously recommended Cannon Mountain.

Environmental concerns were a principal reason for selecting the Cannon site. At Cannon, it was possible to build a tramway with only minor cutting of forests and without marring the scenic beauty of the Notch. In addition, the area was already a major route for tourists in the White Mountains.

Legislation was drafted and passed in 1935, but the project hit a snag when federal financing, a provision of the legislation, proved unavailable. In June 1937, a bill was passed by the New Hampshire legislature and signed into law by Governor Francis P. Murphy authorizing a $250,000 bond issue to finance erection of the tramway. Later Roland E. Peabody was named Managing Director of the Cannon Mountain Aerial Tramway.

In August, American Steel Wire Company was awarded the construction contract and the project rapidly took shape. As the contractor began construction of the tramway, a 200-man CCC camp began work on a parking area and developing the Coppermine, Tucker Brook, Kinsman and Cannon ski trails. Old logging roads on the mountain had been used for skiing since 1929, and the famous Richard Taft Race Course had been developed in 1931–32.

To build the final passenger tramway it was first necessary to construct a freight tramway to carry materials. Carrying cement and materials by backpack, four dozen men completed the formidable task in December. Construction of the tramway continued through the winter, with almost all the work, pouring 32 carloads of cement, assembling 232 tons of steel and four miles (6 km) of cable, done by hand. It was considered an outstanding engineering feat of the period. On June 28, 1938, after nine months of construction and one year after the passage of legislation, North America’s first aerial tramway was dedicated.

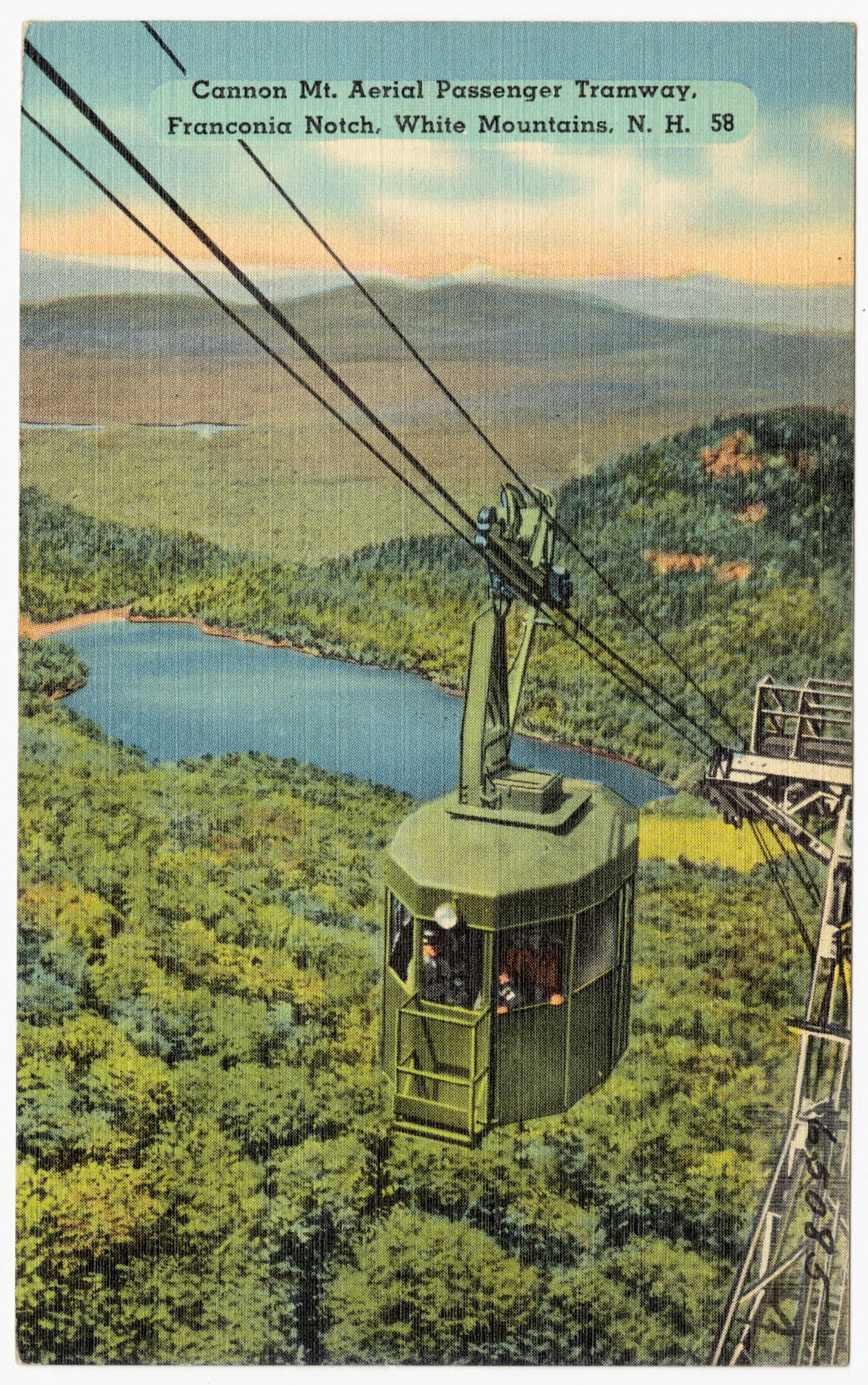
Postcard from the tramway's early years

The opening attracted newspapermen, photographers, newsreel cameramen and syndicated writers from across the nation. Later Lowell Thomas made evening news broadcasts from both the valley and mountain stations. The tramway quickly became a major tourist attraction, carrying 163,000 passengers in its first year.

As its proponents had predicted, the tramway proved not only a sound financial investment for the state, but also confirmed the viability of skiing as an industry in New Hampshire. Cannon Mountain, with the highest vertical drop of any ski mountain in the state, became the pinnacle of Eastern skiing. The success of the state's venture attracted the interest and investment of the private sector, and the ski industry in New Hampshire grew and prospered.

In early 1965, Commissioner George Gilman of the Department of Resources and Economic Development recognized the need to begin planning for the replacement of the original tramway. Although still in prime operating condition, thanks to a diligent maintenance program, the cost of custom-made replacement parts and the tramway's limited passenger capacity made replacement desirable and economically practical. The replacement project was authorized by the New Hampshire legislature in 1977 after a study by consulting engineer Robert Heron proved the project feasible.

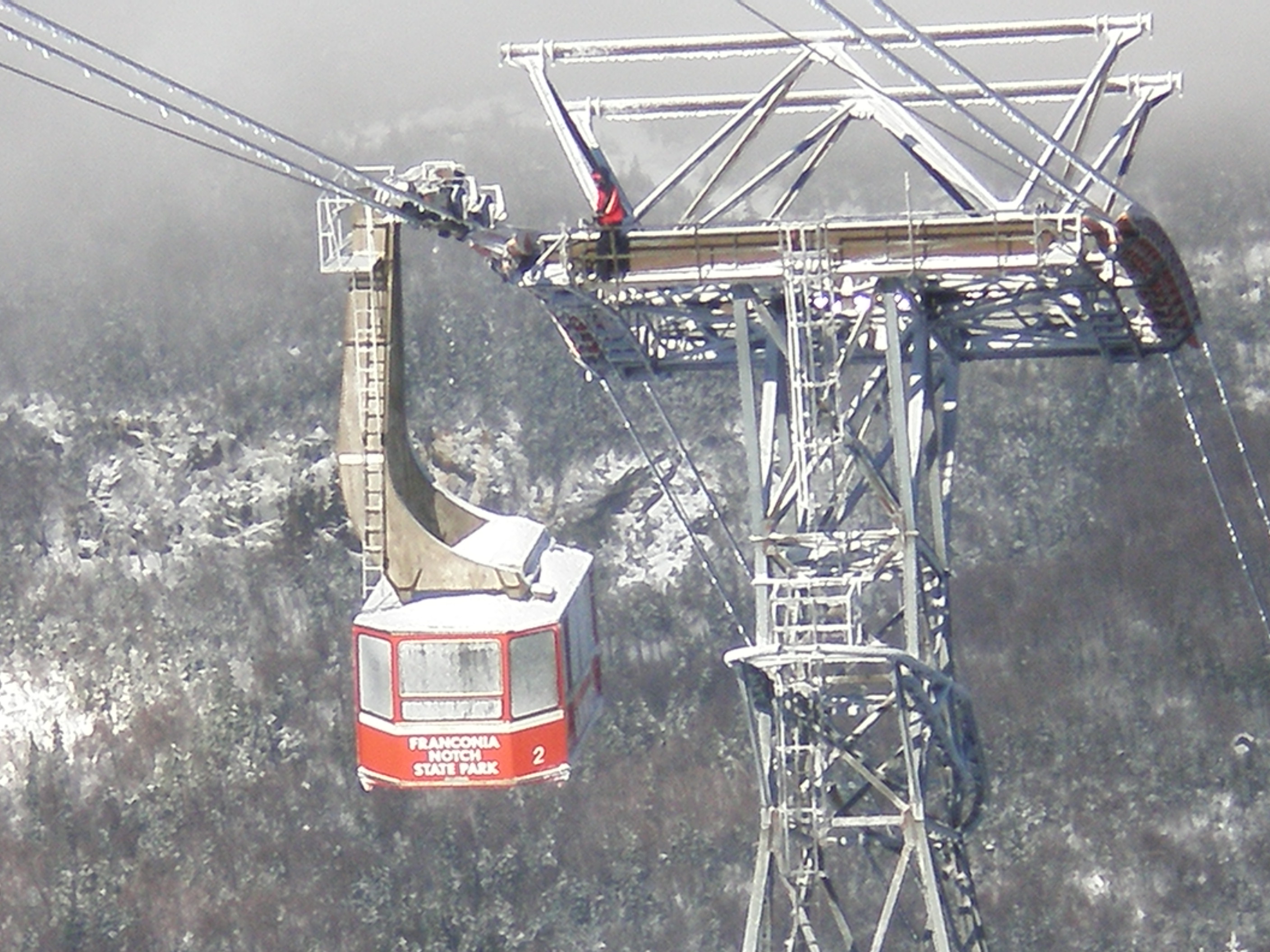
Routine maintenance at the upper tower

In July 1978, a contract for the replacement project was awarded to Nuova Agudio. Preliminary construction begun in July 1978, with the lower terminal completed in April 1979. During the summer of 1979, helicopters were briefly used to airlift some major components. Unlike the original construction project in 1937, there was no need to erect a freight tramway since the existing tramway could be used as the work-horse for moving materials up the mountain. Even as construction proceeded heavy summer passenger traffic was maintained. Construction continued through the cold but nearly snowless winter of 1979–80. In February 1980, the tramway successfully passed a series of stringent operational tests conducted by Nuova Agudio and was approved for passenger traffic by the State of New Hampshire. Cannon Mountain Aerial Tramway II ascends the famous slopes of Cannon Mountain for 5,359 feet (1,633 m). Its two cabins, each with a capacity for 80 passengers and one attendant, travel at a speed of 1,500 feet (460 m) per minute, with an hourly passenger capacity of 1,540, or 770 in each direction, more than three times the capacity of the original tramway.

Until 1984, the north-northwestern face of Cannon was operated under the name Mittersill Ski Area (Cannon Mountain Ski Area occupies the north-northeastern face). The trails are often skied by those that know the area as a result of their ease of accessibility (only a short hike is required from Taft Slalom to find them). However, in the late 1990s/early 2000s (decade), the state of New Hampshire unveiled plans to purchase the north-northwestern face and use the already-cut trails as an expansion to the current ski area. The purchase was completed in 2008. A $2.6 million Doppelmayr double chairlift was ordered, to be installed for the 2010–11 ski season.

== Trails ==
=== Beginner and first-timer (21%) ===
The Tuckerbrook Quad Chair serves beginner trails (Raven Ridge, Huckerbrook, Brookside, Fox Tail, Bear Paw and Deer Run) that are segregated from the upper mountain. The bottom half of Cannon has four long runs suitable for beginners (Lower Cannon, Parkway, Gremlin and Turnpike). This area is most easily accessed via the Eagle Triple Chair, from the Peabody Base Area. The Brookside learning area, a beginner skiing area, is segregated from the rest of the mountain. It is serviced by its own triple chairlift as well as one surface lift. Its location allows novices to progress to the nearby short beginner trails off the Tuckerbrook quad chair.

=== Intermediate (47%) ===
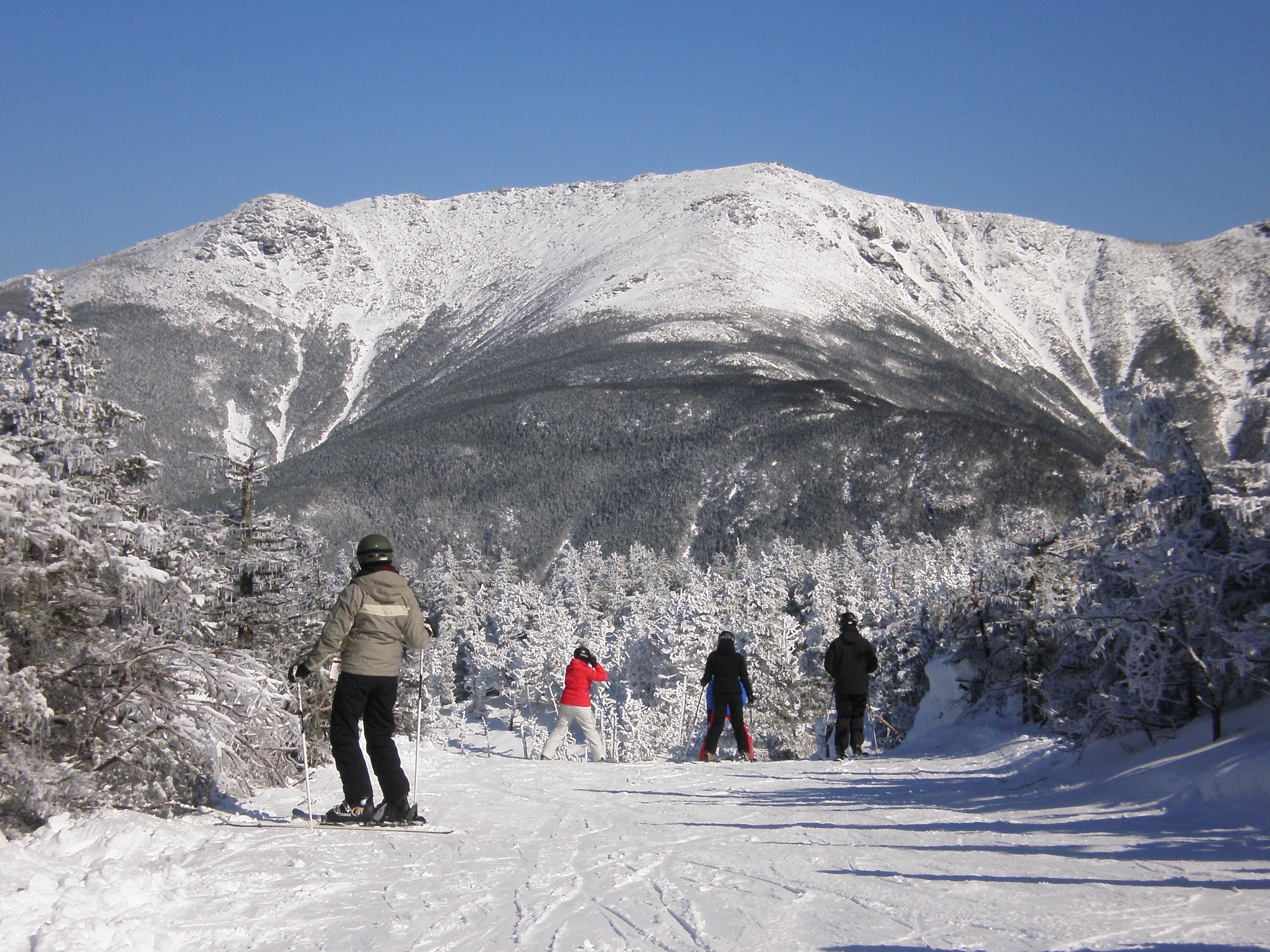
View of Mount Lafayette from Vista Way ski trail on Cannon Mountain.

Although touted as an expert's mountain, the ski area offers slopes for lower ski levels. From the summit, Vista Way, Tramway and Upper Cannon descend through the forest. These feed into a collection of intermediate runs, including Middle Cannon and Middle Ravine. An alternate route, Cannonball Express Quad, is also available. The Tram Cutback is an intermediate return route to the tram from Gary's, considered the easiest of the Front Five.

=== Expert and advanced (32%) ===
Expert trails include DJ's Tramline, a narrow trail that descends via a series of cliff steps. The trail is rarely open because of the amount of snow required to cover the boulders and cliffs scattered throughout the trail. DJ's Tramline has been included in Vermont Sports Magazine's "Gnarly 10 Toughest Trails in the East". There are no double Black Diamonds on Cannon Mountain, only Black Diamonds, although the color/shape nomenclature for trail rating is always relative to the other trails on the mountain. The Tramline, for example, could earn double black diamond at another mountain, and the same thing is possible in the reverse. It is therefore recommended that skiers take careful note of the mountain's average challenge, and to proceed with caution when attempting a new run labeled as "advanced" or "experts only". Besides the Tramline, Avalanche is the steepest run, measuring at a 31 degree vertical pitch. Trails such as Paulie's Folly and Hard Scrabble also have a high vertical pitch. The Mittersill area consists of some of New Hampshire's only sidecountry skiing. Many glades and mogul runs can be found here. One of the longest glades in the east is Kinsman Glade, on skier's right of the tramline. The Front Five trails are accessed via Paulie's Extension or Lower Cannon. Three of them, Avalanche, Paulie's Folly and Zoomer, are marked black. The other two, Rocket and Gary's, have less pitch. From the summit, trails include Cannonball, Skylight or Upper Ravine.

== Lifts ==
Cannon has 10 lifts, with one surface lift (the Huckerbrook Handle Tow) in the Tuckerbrook family area.

Name	Type	Builder	Built	Vertical	Length	Notes
Aerial Tram	Tram 70	Agudio	1979	2,021 ft (616 m)	5,349 ft (1,630 m)	Replaced the original 24 passenger tram built in 1938.
Peabody Express	High Speed Quad	Doppelmayr	1999	1,318 ft (402 m)	5,251 ft (1,601 m)	
Cannonball Express	Quad	Doppelmayr	1990	880 ft (270 m)	2,460 ft (750 m)	Despite having “Express” in its name, it is not a detachable chairlift.
Tuckerbrook	Quad	Doppelmayr	2003	281 ft (86 m)	1,324 ft (404 m)	
Zoomer	Triple	Doppelmayr	1984	630 ft (190 m)	1,640 ft (500 m)	
Eagle Cliff	Triple	Doppelmayr	1999			Relocated from Mount Sunapee.
Brookside	Triple	Doppelmayr	1999	105 ft (32 m)	790 ft (240 m)	
Mittersill	Double	Doppelmayr	2010	1,280 ft (390 m)	4,025 ft (1,227 m)	
Valar	T-Bar	LST	2016	731 ft (223 m)	2,300 ft (700 m)	

In July 2025, Cannon management announced their intent to retire the second-generation tram, commonly referred to as "Ketchup and Mustard," and replace it with a third-generation tram backed by $27.2 million in financing from the New Hampshire state legislature.

== Awards ==
In its 2013 issue, SKI Magazine named Cannon #1 in New Hampshire for value, challenge, lifts/lift service, and overall satisfaction. In the same issue, Cannon was listed in the Top 10 in the East for value, access, challenge, character, lifts/lift service, and overall satisfaction.

== Rentals and ski school ==
Brookside Learning Center offers all-day and part-day youth programs, plus childcare for ages six months and older. Seasonal programs are available. Cannon offers a full-service PSIA Ski and Snowboard School. Slopeside ski shops are located at Peabody Base Lodge and Tram Base; a ski/snowboard rental and service shop is at Peabody Base Lodge. A slopeside High Performance Tuning Center is located at the Peabody Base Lodge. All rental skis are "shaped" skis; all rental snowboards feature "step in" bindings.
