= Outdoor emergency care =

Course for certification of first aid in non-urban situations

Outdoor Emergency Care (OEC) is the flagship program of the National Ski Patrol and the baseline certification for ski patrollers in the United States. The course teaches the provision of basic emergency medical care and transportation to patients in outdoor, non-urban settings.

The program was launched in 1985 for the purpose of providing a uniform training standard for ski patrollers in the United States. Its scope has since expanded; in addition to ski resorts, OEC technicians provide care in wilderness settings, white-water excursions, mountain bike events, and many other outdoor environments.

== Training ==
The standard of training and actual procedures and requirements for OEC meet and exceed those of the first responder basic course and the curriculum contains many of the skills identified in the US Department of Transportation (DOT) 1994 EMT-Basic National Standard Curriculum, although training is specific to needs in outdoor scenarios, such as self-reliance and individual skills. This instead of the EMT curriculum focusing on urban environments with immediate access to additional resources such as additional EMTs and an ambulance. While the OEC curriculum includes a skill set and fund of knowledge that exceeds those of the Emergency Medical Responder (EMR) program, it does not include all the knowledge needed for an EMT program since it emphasizes caring for patients in the wilderness, with a focus on snow-sports Pathology. Because of this, OEC technicians typically have a similar standards of training compared to EMT-basic responders, albeit several different focuses of the training: with OEC devoting a larger portion of the curriculum to Musculoskeletal injury, Splinting, Bandaging, and environmental emergencies and devoting comparatively less time on patients with a medical based issue. OEC technicians are first responders, not definitive medical care, and have the knowledge to care for, transport, and treat patients, but not to diagnose them or provide terminal support or invasive therapies.

OEC technician training focuses primarily on assessing and treating immediate life threats to the patients' airway, breathing and circulation; stabilizing the patient; and transporting them (if necessary) to rendezvous with equal or higher levels of medical care, especially an ambulance. Based on severity, the OEC technician will often manage secondary concerns either before transporting (most common), or while waiting for rendezvous. These typically include fractures, sprains, bleeding, head injuries, and medical concerns including anaphylaxis, acute myocardial infarction, and hypoglycemia (diabetes).

The scope of practice of the OEC technician is entirely basic life support and non-invasive. It is determined for each operating agency (most often a local ski patrol) by a local medical director, most typically a physician, and effected through protocols, standing orders, and off-line medical direction. Most often, the OEC technician is unable to consult with a physician medical director to receive on-line instructions, unlike an EMT, so they follow already established local protocols. Protocols and standing orders may differ slightly from the OEC standards of training, but maximally, may include the following:

Use of external Airway Adjunct, namely the OPA and NPA. Manual and mechanical airway suctioning. Dislodging of foreign body airway obstructions through heimlich maneuver and visible finger sweeps. Airway positioning using head-tilt chin-lift and jaw-thrust maneuvers. BLS cardiopulmonary resuscitation. Automated external defibrillation using the AED. Application of up to 100% oxygen therapy via non-rebreather mask or nasal cannula. Positive-pressure ventilation using a bag valve mask device. Use of body substance isolation, assessing and maintaining scene safety, assessing level of responsiveness, including Glasgow coma scale. Controlling external bleeding through application of direct pressure, elevation, hemostatic dressings, and tourniquets. Application of occlusive dressings, bulky dressings, et cetera. Obtaining medical histories, physical, and neurological assessments. Documentation of medical situations. Obtaining and subjective interpretation of vital signs including blood pressure, blood-oxygen saturation (SpO2), heart rate, respirations, eye and skin signs, and lung sounds through auscultation. Eye irrigation. Application of soft and rigid splints to all body parts, and assessing distal neurovascular functions. Initiation and application of triage. Reducing a posterior sternoclavicular dislocation. Relieving pressure from a subungual hematoma. Maintaining manual, in-line stabilization of the spine, including long spine board immobilization and application of a cervical collar. Seated spinal immobilization, including use of the kendrick extrication device. Application of a traction splint. Assisting in the uncomplicated delivery of an infant, including managing conditions such as nuchal cord, prolapsed cord, and breech delivery. Recognizing and providing supportive care to common medical ailments including medical shock, anaphylaxis, diabetic emergencies, environmental emergencies, cardiac emergencies, et cetera. Assisting patients in administration of certain patient-provided, already-prescribed medications including an albuterol metered-dose inhaler, epinephrine autoinjector, and nitroglycerin. Assisting administration of certain over-the-counter drugs to patients, including aspirin to patients suspected of AMI, oral glucose to hypoglycemic patients, and activated charcoal to patients having ingested poisonous substances.

Drugs within the scope of practice of OEC include adrenaline, albuterol, nitroglycerin, oral glucose gel, activated charcoal, aspirin for AMI, and oxygen therapy. In general, the patient must provide their own medications, already prescribed by a physician, in order to be assisted with them by the OEC technician. This is partially due to the fact that the OEC technician does not have access to the prescription controlled drugs epinephrine, albuterol, or nitroglycerin; thus they must be provided by the patient. These are medications typically carried by patients in most situations. In addition, the technician may not administer these medications to the patient, but may simply assist the patient in taking it themselves. This includes identifying the appropriate situation in which to do so. The degree to which the technicians' help constitutes assisting is vaguely defined, and it is thus is considered that the OEC technician is given a wide berth of discretion in this regard. The rule regarding patients providing their own medications does not apply to the "drugs" oral glucose, activated charcoal, aspirin, or oxygen as the first two are not pharmacologically active; aspirin and oxygen have very few contraindications; they are not prescription controlled (except medical oxygen, which is not prescribed per patient, but rather per institution); and none are typically carried by patients. Thus, the OEC technician typically has access to these four interventions and may assist in their administration as warranted.

Technicians must attend annual OEC refresher courses in order to maintain their certification. The OEC refreshers cover 1/3 of the OEC curriculum each year which cycles through the entire course every three years. OEC technicians are trained to understand medical, legal and ethical issues, to use innovative methods to perform their tasks, and to be mindful of consent and refusal of care. OEC technicians are able to effectively interface with the next level of care for their patients, usually ambulances with other EMTs and paramedics; and rarely hospitals.

== See also ==
- Aid station
- Certified first responder
- Wilderness first responder
