= Roger Langley =

American skiing administrator (1901–1986)

- Born: June 4, 1901
- Died: 1986
- Occupation(s): Teacher, Ski Industry Leader and Pioneer
- Known for: President of the National Ski Association of America (now U.S. Ski & Snowboard), Cofounder of the National Ski Patrol

Roger Langley (June 4, 1901 – 1986) was the 1936 – 1948 president of the National Ski Association of America (now known as U.S. Ski & Snowboard) and a driving force behind the founding of the National Ski Patrol.

Langley's skiing career started in 1924 as athletic director at the Eaglebrook School in Deerfield, Massachusetts. At the request of headmaster Howard G. Gibbs, Langley set an alpine slalom course and formed the first junior ski program in the country.

Starting in 1936, Langley was involved with the United States Olympic Ski Team, serving as chairman or secretary for the team in multiple Olympic Games.

In 1938, Langley, Charles Minot Dole and Roland Palmedo founded the National Ski Patrol. Langley was awarded NSP National Appointment number 1 (Palmedo and Dole were appointments 2 and 3, respectively).

In 1958 Langley was inducted into the United States National Ski Hall of Fame, which he had helped establish in 1954.
