= Rescue toboggan =

Rigid sled for rescues in alpine settings

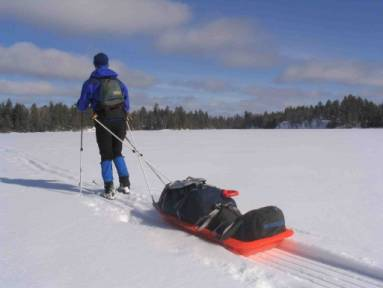
A cross country skier in Finland pulling a pulk with outdoor baggage

A rescue toboggan, also known as a rescue sled or emergency rescue sledge, or by the Finnish word ahkio (also transliterated akia, ackja, akija, and akja), is a carrier for transporting a person or goods on snowy or icy surfaces. It is used by mountain rescue or ski patrol teams to evacuate an injured skier or snowboarder. There are related designs for use on water to carry accident victims or emergency equipment.

A rescue toboggan takes the form of a pulk or small sled shaped as an elongated boat-like pan, usually made of aluminum or fiberglass, with vaulted ends, each of which may be attached to forked extending handles. There are many variations and adaptations such as a brake, stability fins, and an integrated or removable litter. A particular variation may be preferred by various regions or individual ski patrollers.

== Design ==
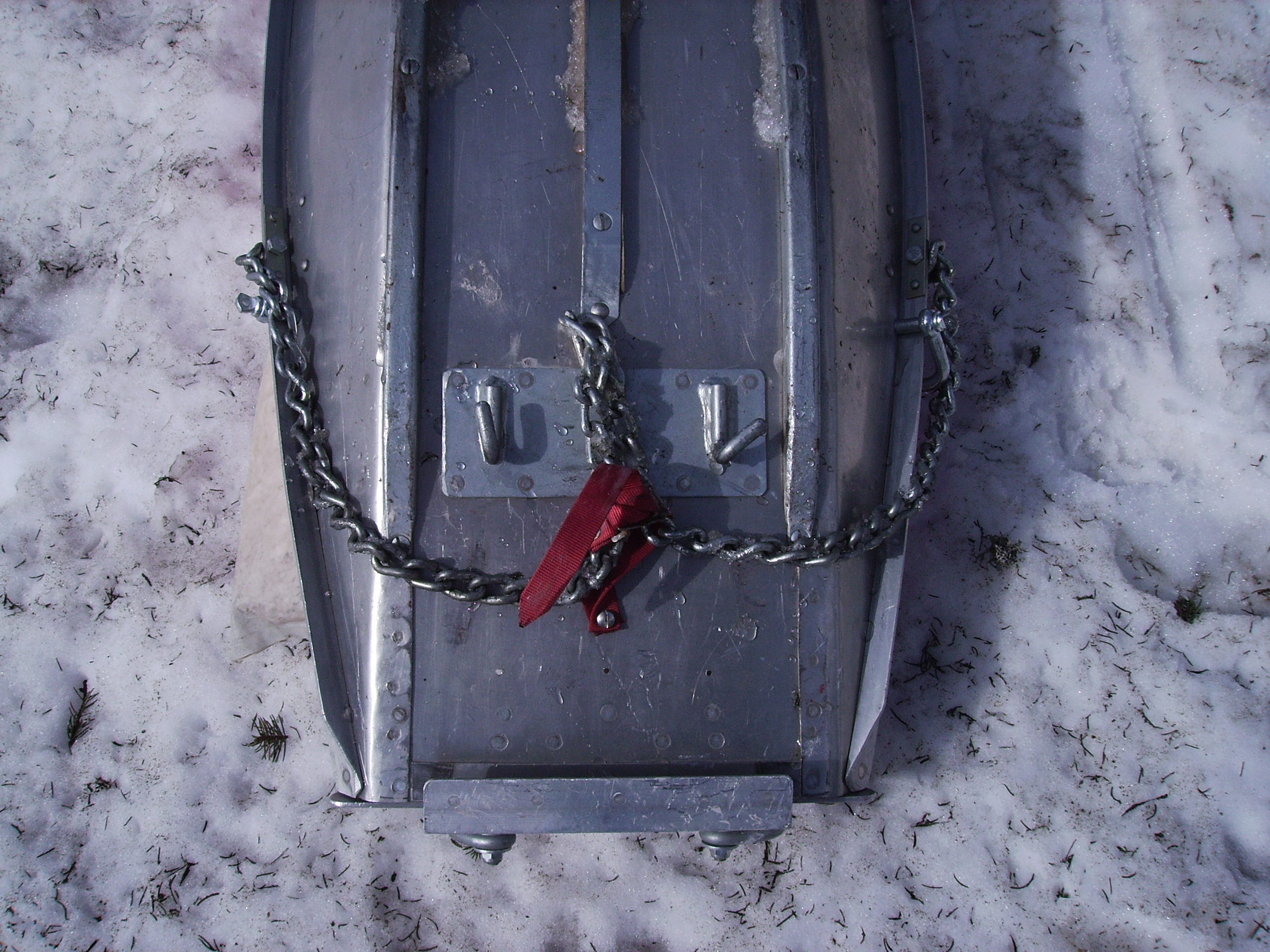
Chain brake on bottom of toboggan

The trough has a trapezoidal cross section and the edges of the lower surfaces have three central stiffening skids. The straight bars, often made of steel pipe, lower the contour of the lower space and end with large oval rings about twice hip width.

The toboggan is directionally symmetrical so it can move either head first or foot first. When empty or with a light load, it can be handled by one person alone. With a full load or a well secured person in it, it requires two rescuers on skis who can take much of the weight of the load off the snow through two sets of handles to prevent passenger impacts from bumps for a smoother and safer ride with better control from four ski edges.

A chain brake under the downhill end controls speed in steep terrain when pressure is applied to the front spars which proportionally affects the location and length of the chain to regulate the braking effect. A line attached to the toboggan secures it to a rescuer.

There are one and two piece toboggans. The latter is divisible so it can be carried on a backpack. The bars can be removed to carry the basket in a vehicle or on ski lifts and snowcats.

Previous models were made of wood.

== Use ==
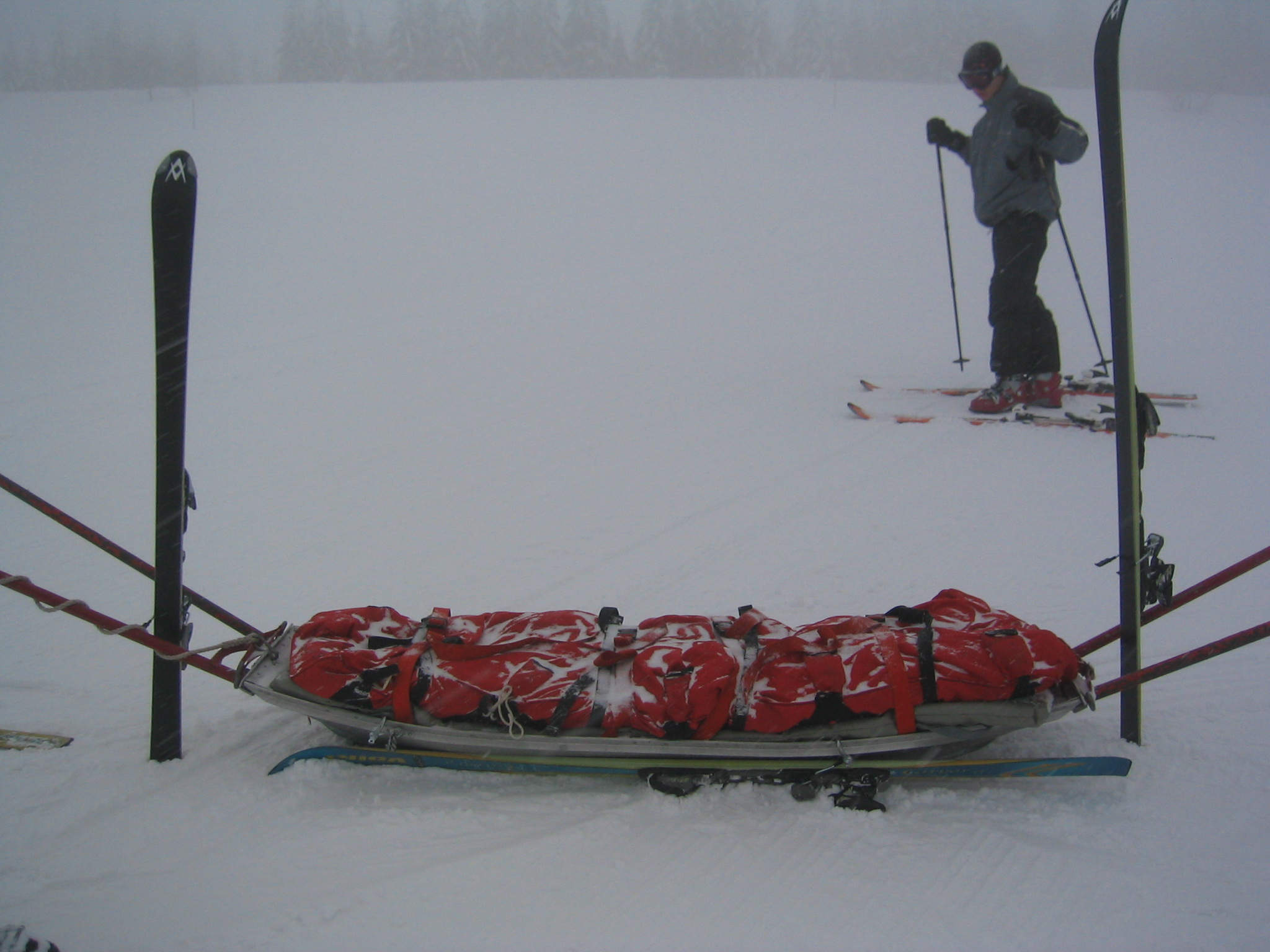
Secured toboggan

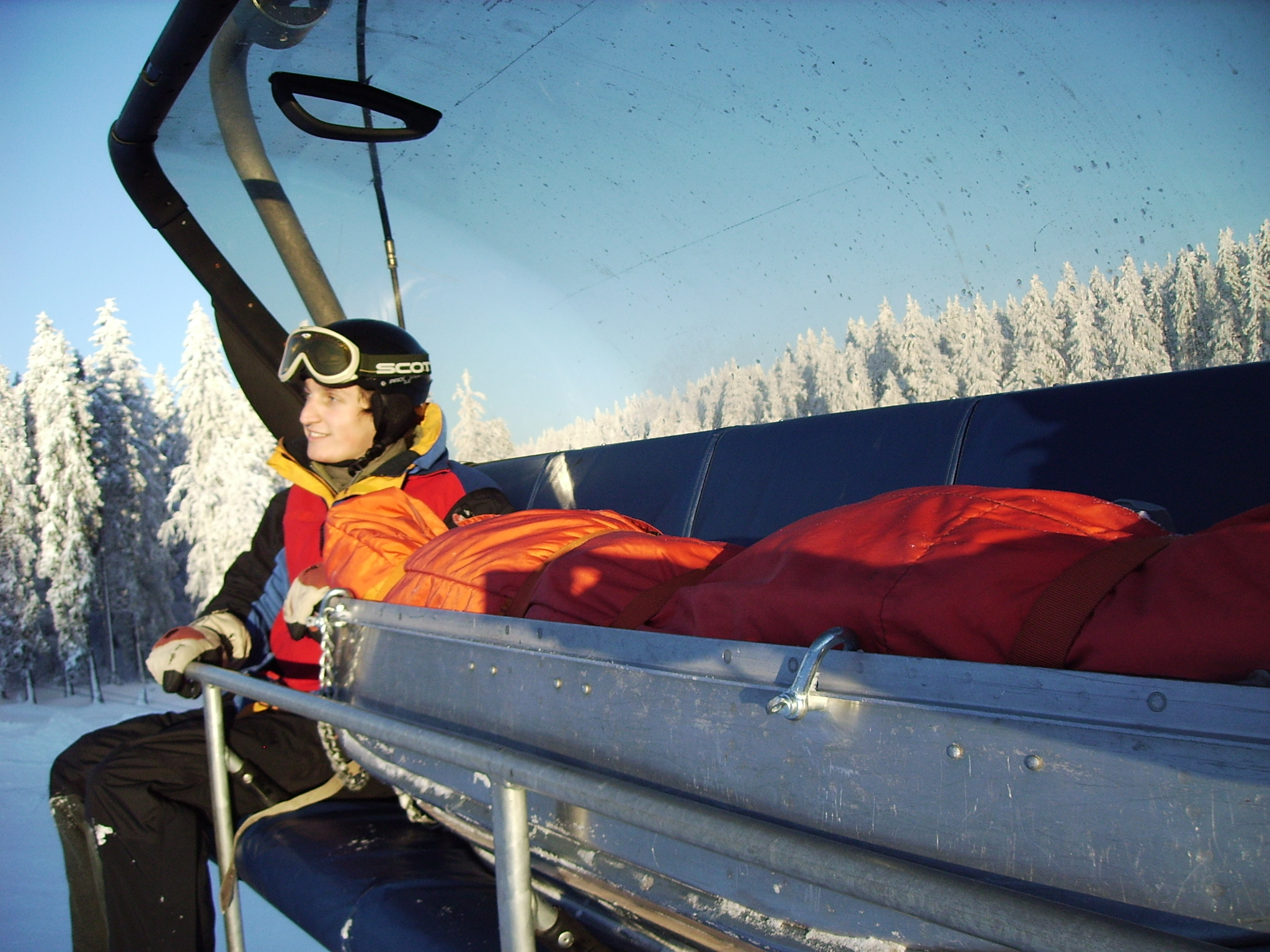
A chairlift transporting a toboggan

After first aid or other initial medical treatment, the patient is placed in the toboggan wrapped in a vacuum mattress or insulating pads, and wrapped with a windproof blanket. Heat reflective emergency blankets reflect thermal radiation and heating packs, hot water bottles, or electric blankets might be used to warm the patient.

If the patient has injuries to the lower extremities and must be transported over longer steep distances, they are additionally held in a rescue seat and drawn up to relieve the legs and protect them from body weight.

After securing the injured person, they are transported to a point where evacuation by vehicle can occur. The rescue toboggan and patient can be carried by ambulance on roads or by a rescue helicopter.

In summer, toboggans can be used as an alternative to stretchers when on rough terrain. For longer distances on trails or other grounds, a centrally-placed wheeled axle carries a large proportion of the patient's weight.

== History ==
Akias were used by Finnish military at least from the 1930s, after that being adopted by ski patrollers and rescuers around the world, such as Mount Hood Ski Patrol to replace dogsleds.
