= Clarita Heath =

American alpine skier (1916–2003)

Personal information
- Born: August 27, 1916; Pasadena, California, United States
- Died: 13 October 2003 (aged 87); Brookline, Massachusetts, United States

Sport
- Sport: Alpine skiing

Clarita Heath (August 27, 1916 – October 13, 2003) was an American alpine skier. She competed in the women's combined event at the 1936 Winter Olympics.
