= Mountain rescue =

Search and rescue activities

Aspects of mountain rescue

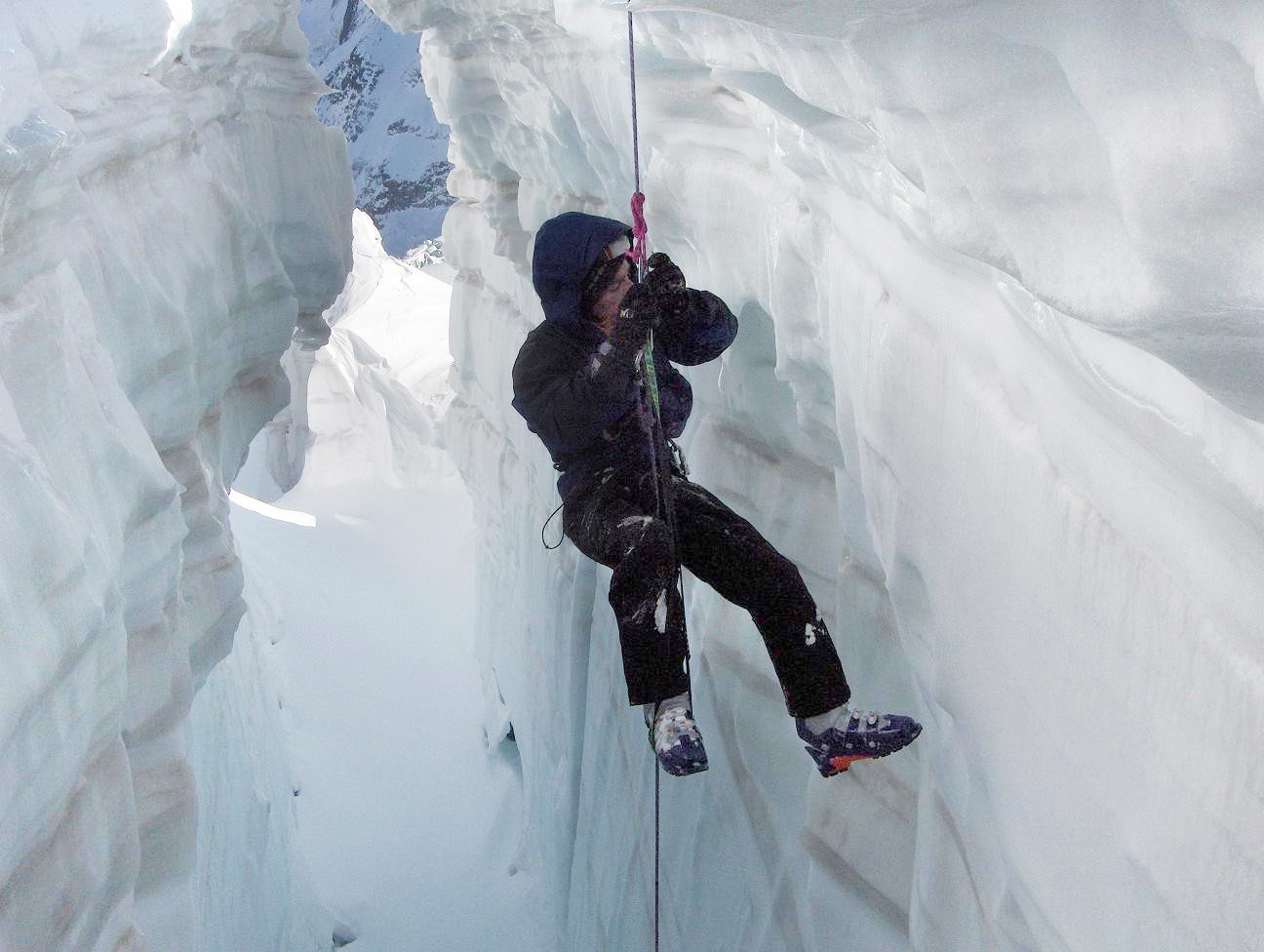
Crevasse rescue

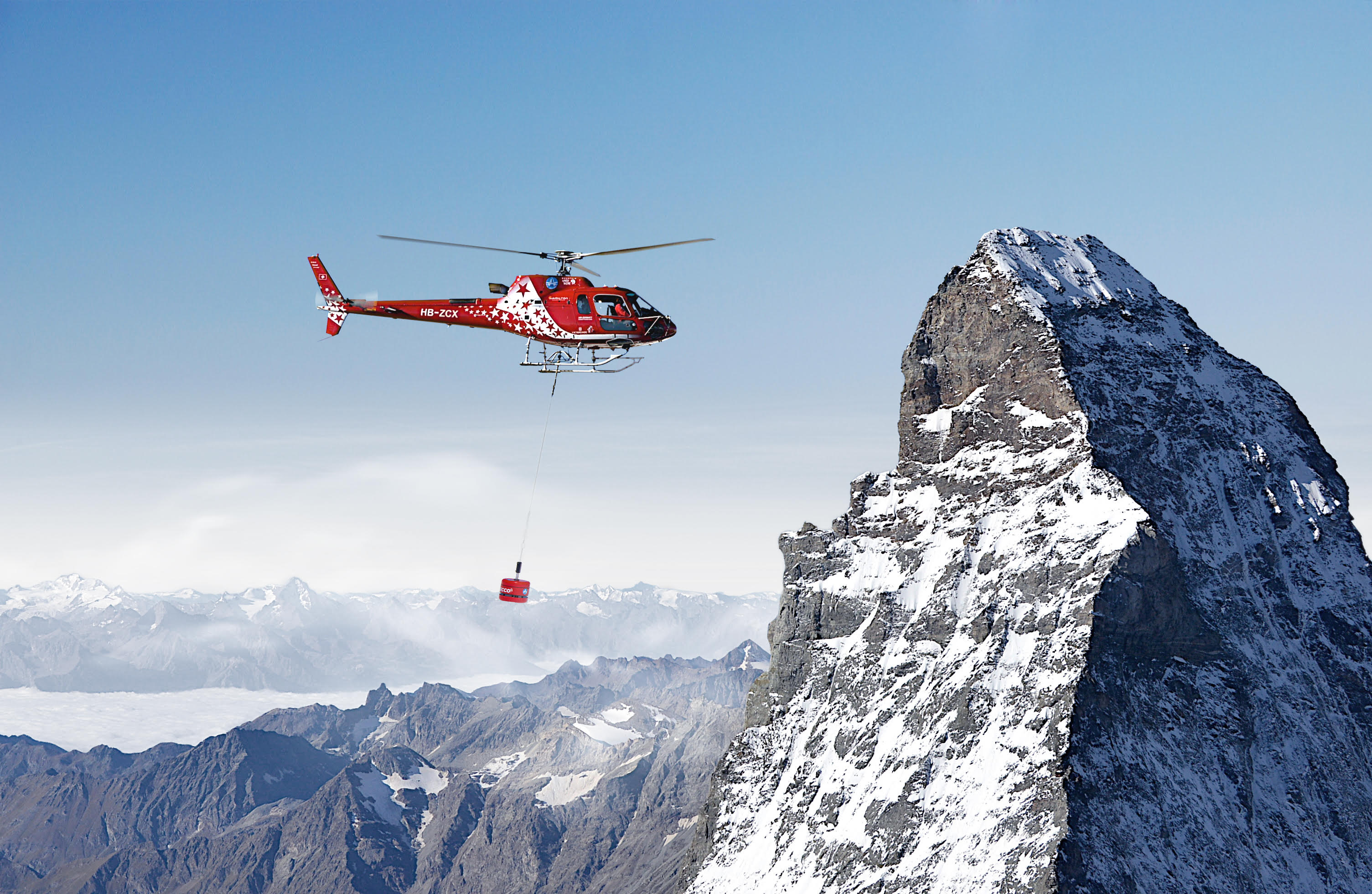
Helicopter rescue

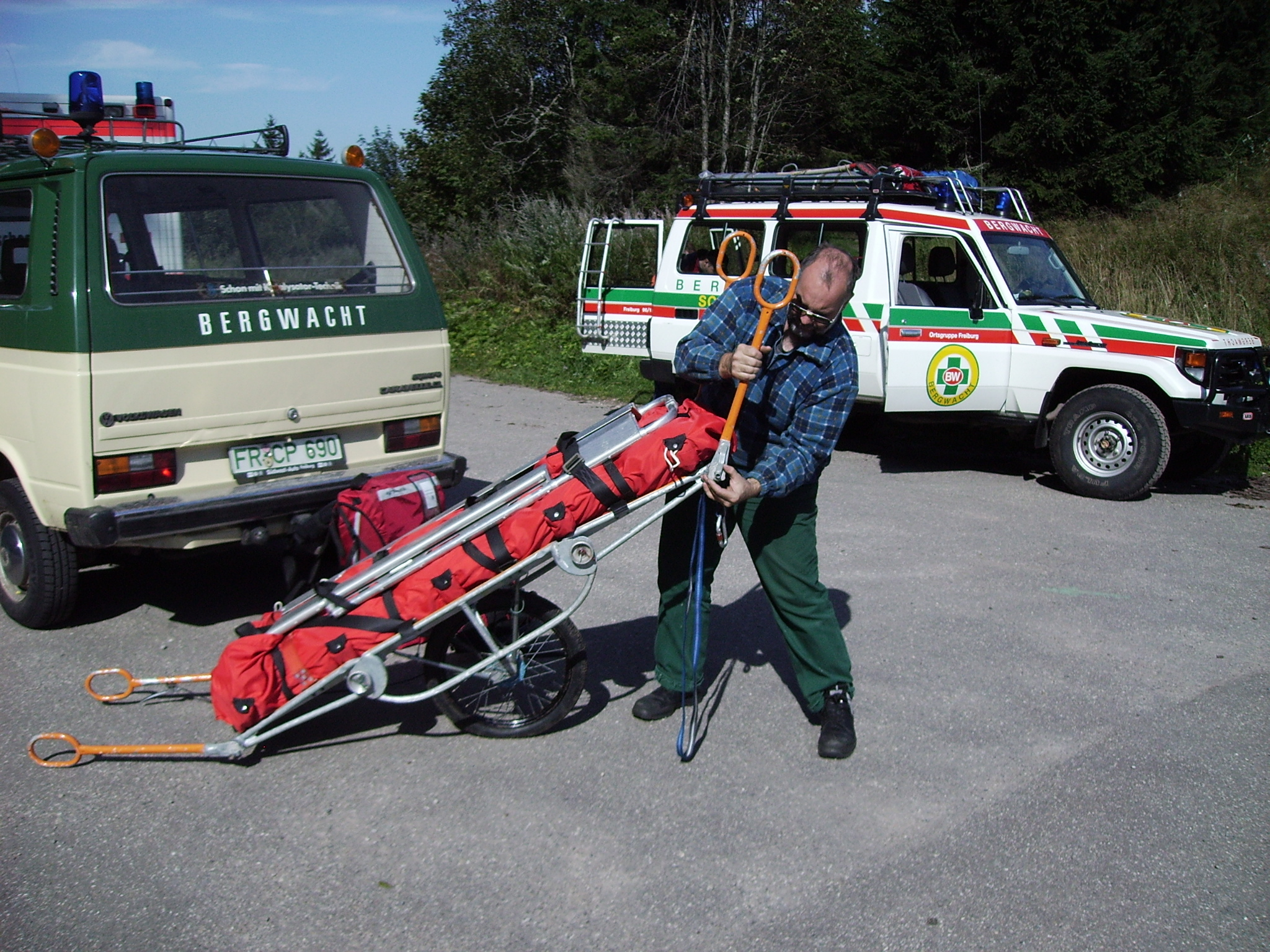
Rescue toboggan

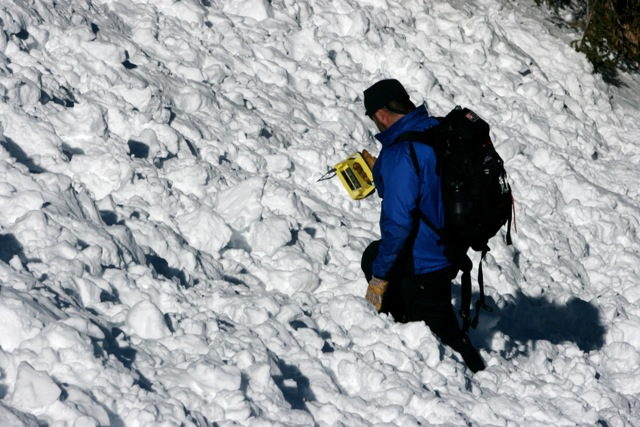
Avalanche rescue

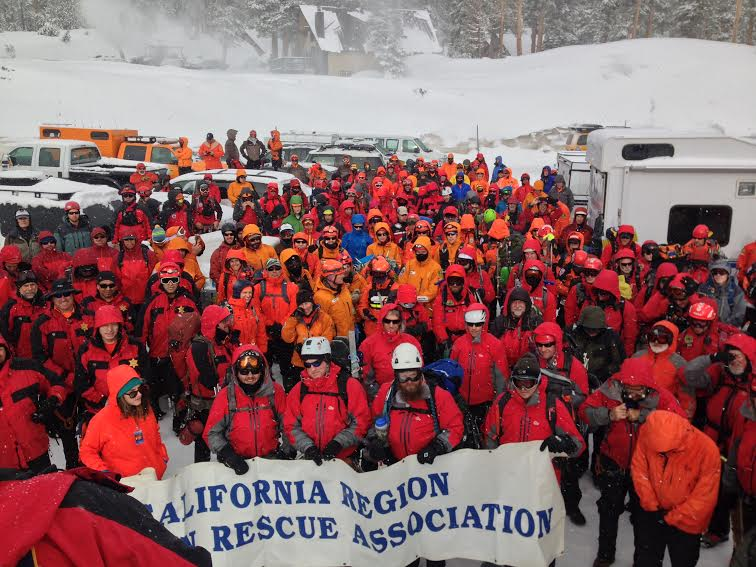
Volunteer groups

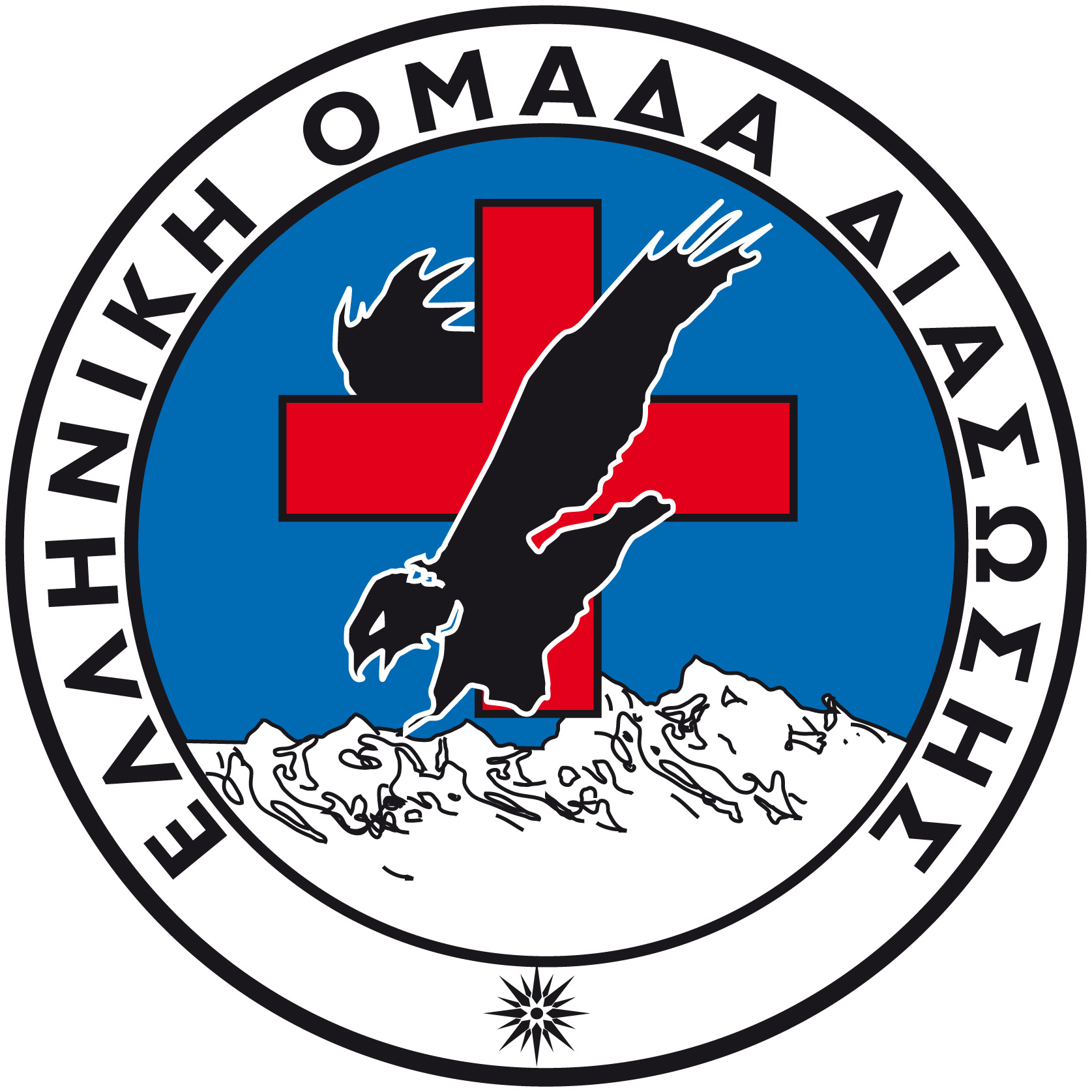
State agencies

Mountain rescue refers to search and rescue activities that occur in a mountainous environment, although the term is sometimes also used to apply to search and rescue in other wilderness environments. This tends to include mountains with technical rope access issues, snow, avalanches, ice, crevasses, glaciers, alpine environments and high altitudes. The difficult and remote nature of the terrain in which mountain rescue often occurs has resulted in the development of a number of specific pieces of equipment and techniques. Helicopters are often used to quickly extract casualties, and search dogs may be deployed to find a casualty.

Mountain rescue services may be paid professionals or volunteer professionals. Paid rescue services are more likely to exist in places with a high demand such as the Alps, national parks with mountain terrain and many ski resorts. However, the labor-intensive and occasional nature of mountain rescue, along with the specific techniques and local knowledge required for some environments, means that mountain rescue is often undertaken by voluntary teams. These are frequently made up of local climbers and guides. Often paid rescue services may work in co-operation with voluntary services. For instance, a paid helicopter rescue team may work with a volunteer mountain rescue team on the ground. Mountain rescue is often free, although in some parts of the world rescue organizations may charge for their services. But there are also exceptions, e.g. Switzerland, where mountain rescue is highly expensive (some 2,000 to US$4,000) and will be charged to the patient. In more remote or less-developed parts of the world organized mountain rescue services are often negligible or non-existent.

== By country ==
=== Austria ===
Österreichischer Bergrettungsdienst (ÖBRD) performs mountain rescue operations in the Austrian Alps and in Waldviertel.

Alpiner Rettungsausschuß Wien (ARAW) was founded in 1896 after an avalanche on Rax killed three mountaineers. In 1938 the organization was merged with the Deutsche Bergwacht. In 1946 (after World War II) the Austrian Mountain Rescue Service was (re)founded as Österreichischer Bergrettungsdienst.

=== Bosnia and Herzegovina ===
Due to its mountainous terrain, following the Second World War, Bosnia and Herzegovina saw a need for the development and organization of a modern-day equivalent of the mountain rescue service. The first mountain rescue "station", which consisted of professionally trained and semi-professional volunteers was founded in 1952 in Sarajevo and is the oldest continuously-functioning organization of such type in the present-day Bosnia and Herzegovina. As the need arose even further, stations in additional cities were established as well. The Bosnian Mountain Rescue Union, although existent, acts merely as a supervisory-organization, as each station acts and finances itself independently, mostly relying on their distinguished municipal offices of Civil Defense.

=== Canada ===
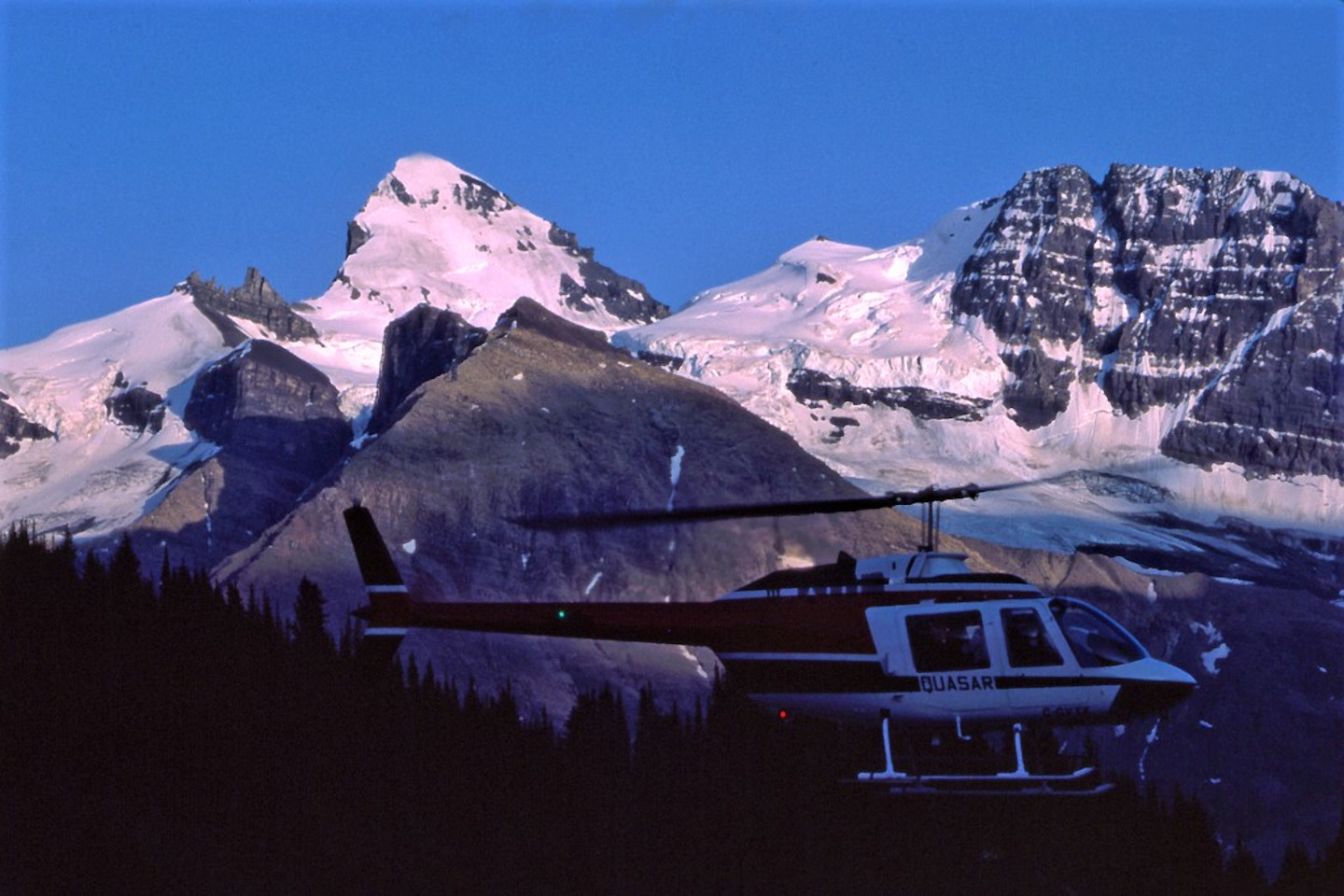
Choppering out the injured – with Mt. Forbes in the background

In the five mountain national parks of the Canadian Rockies, mountain rescue is solely the responsibility of Parks Canada's visitor safety rescue specialists.

Large areas in all Canadian national parks do not have reliable two-way radio or cellular coverage. The use of SOS, satellite phone or two-way communicating send devices like Garmin InReach or SPOT is recommended.

There is no charge to park visitors who require help as search and rescue costs are part of the visitor's park entrance fee. Parks Canada visitor safety specialists also manage highway avalanche control programs and publish a daily public avalanche bulletin between November and May.

=== Czech Republic ===
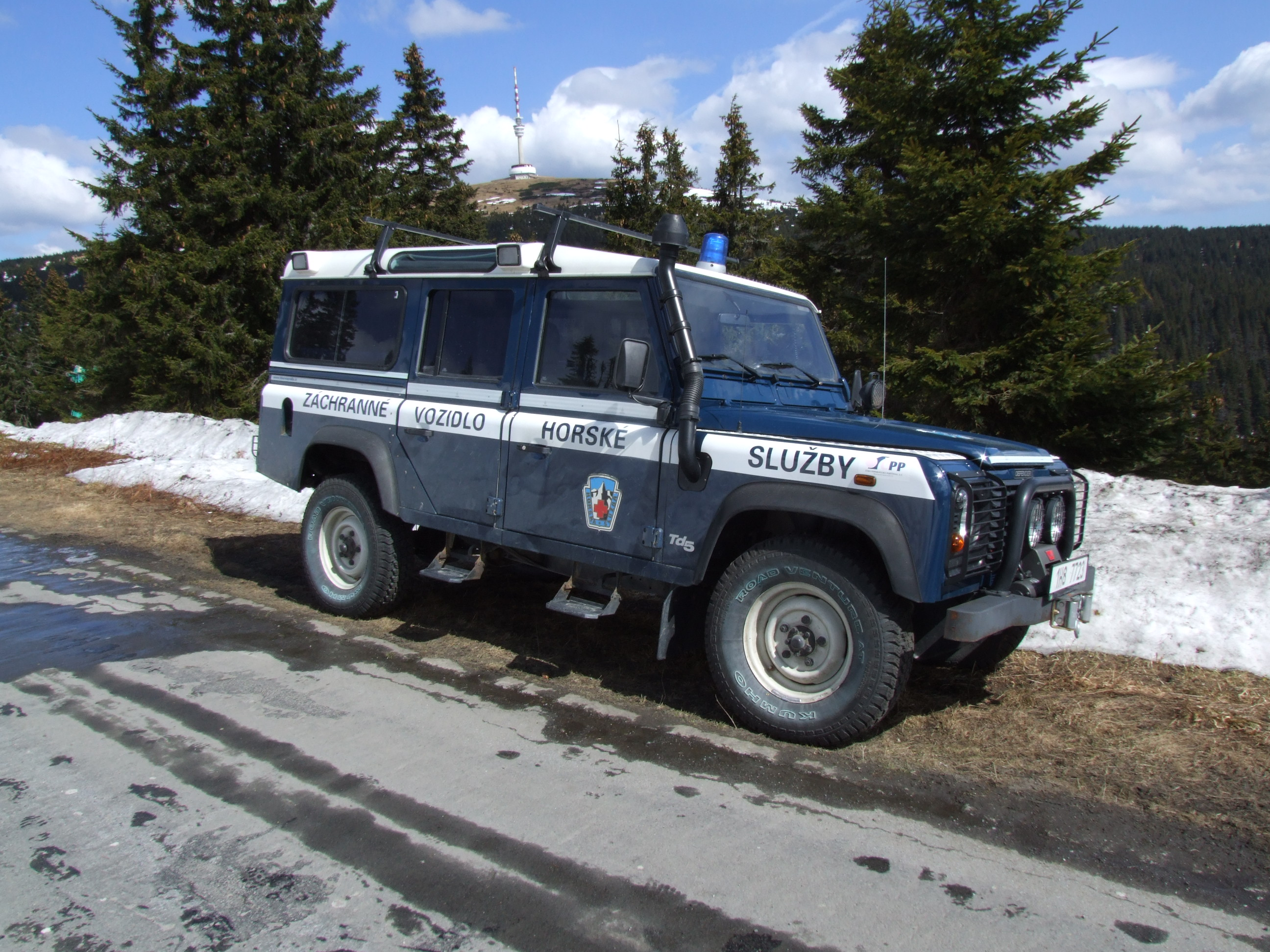
Car of Horská služba (Czech Republic)

The Mountain Rescue Service (Horská služba České republiky, HS ČR) of the Czech Republic provides nationwide mountain rescue operations and search and rescue operations in difficult terrains in close cooperations with the Air Rescue Service and Police of the Czech Republic. It is a part of the integrated rescue system in the Czech Republic and can be reached under the phone number 1210 (paid number) or under 112 - EU standard integrated emergency service.

=== France ===
The Gendarmerie Nationale and the Police nationale are in charge of mountain rescuing. Being a paramilitary police force with law-enforcement assignments, the gendarmerie has a wide variety of missions, mainly:

- search and rescue
- surveillance of mountain areas
- law enforcement
- prevention of accidents and safety of public
- deliver expert reports before the courts

The gendarmerie employs 260 gendarmes, divided into 20 units nationwide;

- 15 Peloton de Gendarmerie de Haute Montagne (PGHM) sprinkled in the Alps and the Pyrénées, in addition to the islands of Réunion in the Indian Ocean and Corsica.
- 5 Peloton de Gendarmerie de Montagne, in the Massif central and Vosges areas.

90 per cent of interventions are made by air.

The police Compagnie républicaine de sécurité also provides mountain search and rescue in the French Alps and Pyrenees alongside the PGHM.

=== Hong Kong ===
The Civil Aid Service, Mountain Rescue Unit (M.R.U.) was established in 1967 due to the demand for a mountain rescue service. At first, the M.R.U. had two separate command centres, one in Hong Kong Island, and the other in the Kowloon Peninsula. The two command centres merged in 1972 to a single centre based at the Civil Aid Service headquarters in Kowloon. In 2005, the M.R.U. was renamed the "Mountain Search and Rescue Company" (MSaR). The Mountain Search and Rescue Company of the Civil Aid Service is responsible for rescue operations in the hills and hiking trails of Hong Kong. As of 2014 the Company has 13 officers and 128 members. The unit works alongside the Government Flying Service in the air and Hong Kong Fire Services on the ground. Besides rescue operations, MSaR also help promote mountaineering safety.

=== Ireland ===
Mountain rescue services in Ireland operate under the umbrella association of Mountain Rescue Ireland (Cumann Tarrthála Sléibhte na h-Éireann). Mountain Rescue Ireland covers areas across the island of Ireland, both in the Republic of Ireland and Northern Ireland.

=== Israel ===
Unit 669 "Airborne Combat Rescue And Evacuation Unit" is the Israel Defense Forces heliborne combat search and rescue extraction unit, subordinate to 7 Wing (special forces) of the Israeli Air Force. It is considered one of the four premier elite units of unit the IDF. The mandate of the unit is to rescue downed pilots and execute airborne medical evacuation of critical casualties. Due to its unique capabilities, the unit participates in IDF's and other security bodies special operations. In addition, the unit's teams are rushed to complex rescue events for which civilian emergency services are unable to provide an adequate response.

=== Italy ===
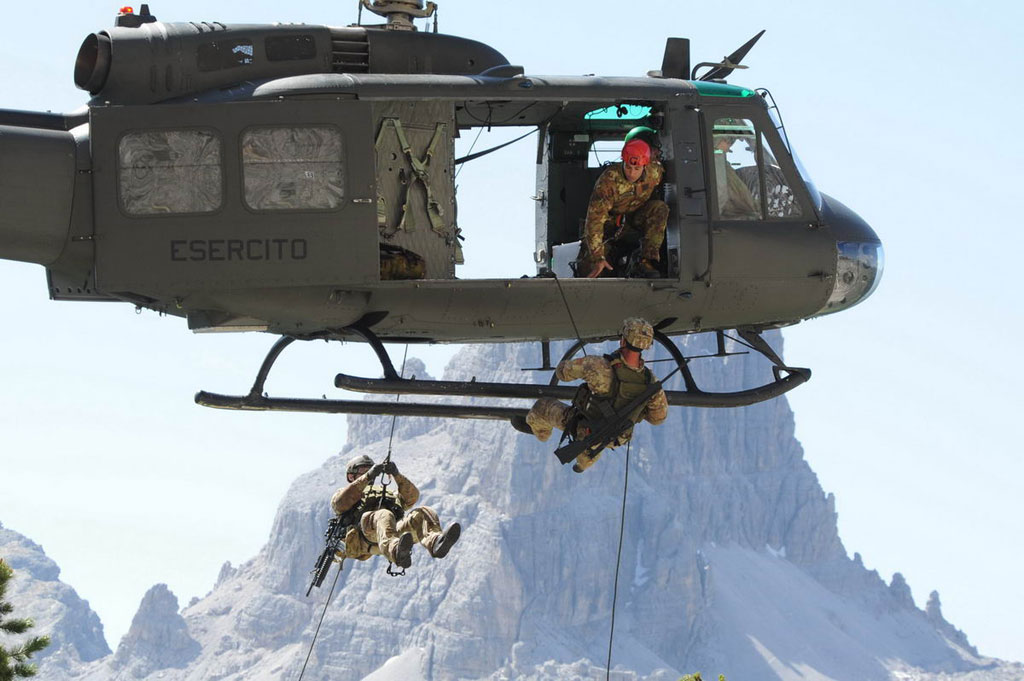
An Alpini mountain SAR rescue team rappelling from a 4th Army Aviation Regiment "Altair" AB 205A helicopter in the Dolomites

Mountain rescue in Italy is provided by CNSAS (Corpo Nazionale Soccorso Alpino e Speleologico, En. The National Alpine Cliff and Cave Rescue Corps), a voluntary agency that provides nationwide mountain search and rescue operations in difficult terrains in close cooperations with the Medical Air Rescue Service 118, with Meteomont army team and Police of Italy under the phone number 112- EU standard integrated emergency service. The main missions are search and rescue, avalanche response, first aid, surveillance of mountain areas, prevention of accidents, and public safety.

=== Kyrgyzstan ===
Rescue service in mountains of Kyrgyzstan is a non commercial specialized organization. Rescue teams use modern rescue equipment and a helicopter. The team consists of experienced climbers and rescuers. Works are conducted on a mountain relief of any complexity, at any heights and routes. The organization has been accredited in Ministry of Emergency Situations of the Kyrgyz Republic in accordance with the legislation of the Kyrgyz Republic and has the right to conduct rescue operations.

=== Pakistan ===
Mountain rescues at high elevations in Pakistan are usually carried out by the Pakistan Army Aviation Corps. On July 30, 2018, a Russian climber was rescued from Latok Peak at an elevation of 20,650 feet, a record for the highest mountain rescue in Pakistan.

=== Slovakia ===
The Mountain Rescue Service (Horská záchranná služba, HZS) of Slovakia is a civilian agency that provides nationwide mountain rescue operations and search and rescue operations in difficult terrains in close cooperation with the Air Rescue Service. It is a part of the integrated rescue system in Slovakia and can be reached under the phone number 18300 or under 112 - EU standard integrated emergency service.

=== Spain ===
Since 1981 the Guardia Civil's Search and Rescue Group (Grupo de Rescate e Intervención en Montaña-GREIM) has been responsible for mountain rescue in all of Spain except for Catalonia. Before 1981 mountain rescue was provided by volunteers.

The unit is divided into:

- Special Mountain Unit
- Expeditionary Alpine Group
- Competition Team
- Special Mountain training Center

The group comprises 250 members who undergo ten months training in a specialized training center in Candanchu. The unit is divided into five regions (Jaca, Cangas de Onís, Navacerrada, Granada, Vielha e Mijaran). In 2011 they carried out 761 missions.

In Catalonia a special division of the fire department, GRAE (Support Group for Special Actions), are responsible for mountain rescue.

=== Switzerland ===
Switzerland has an incredibly dense network of alpine rescue and relief organisations. Most of the rescue are operated by Swiss Air-Rescue Rega (German: Schweizerische Rettungsflugwacht, French: Garde aérienne suisse de sauvetage, Rega), a non-profit organisation that provide alpine rescue with its fleet of 17 medical helicopters, including 11 Agusta A109 SP Grand "Da Vinci", used both in ground support of paramedical personnel and frontline alpine rescue. Swiss Air-Rescue Rega has two very distinctive characteristics: they can reach any place in Switzerland under 15 minutes, due to their ten bases, and they are medicalized. This means an emergency physician (mostly an anesthetist) will be on the flight to provide advanced treatment.

The Swiss canton of Valais doesn't use Rega, they have their own rescue fleet, named Air Glacier and Air Zermatt. They have similar colours, procedures and personnel.

The Swiss army is also used in frontline rescue of civilians. Their many mountain battalions are commonly used in collaboration with the Rega, due to their manpower, heavy equipment and proven experience of collaboration with civilian authorities.

=== United Kingdom ===
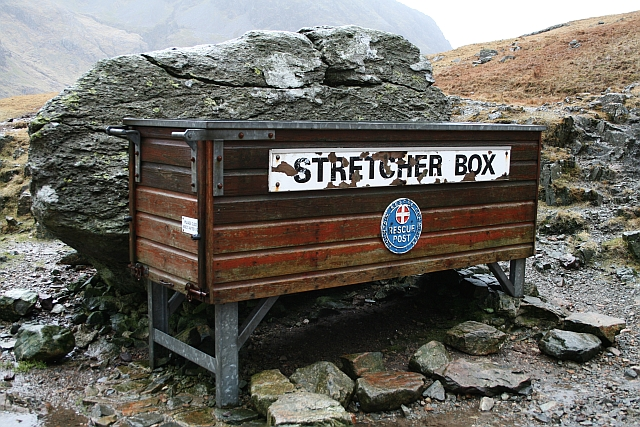
Stretcher box in Cumbria, England, prepositioned equipment saves mountain rescue teams having to trudge up mountains with it.

In the United Kingdom, mountain rescue is a free service, provided by volunteers. Each team is an independent charity, and are linked together by regional organizations and national bodies. In England and Wales this is Mountain Rescue England and Wales (MREW) and in Scotland, Mountain Rescue Committee of Scotland, now known as Scottish Mountain Rescue (SMR). Prince William is the patron of MREW. Mountain rescue services are also provided by the Royal Air Force Mountain Rescue Service (RAFMRS).

=== United States of America ===
In the United States, mountain search and rescue is a technical specialty within general search and rescue. It is handled by 'career, on-duty and on-call paid' teams within the national parks, and supplemented by other paid and volunteer assets/resources as needed. For areas outside the national parks, there are approximately 20 agencies, mostly sheriff's departments, in the U.S. which provide paid or career members of a mountain SAR team. Most of those supplement with volunteer professionals. The bulk of mountain SAR operations in the U.S. are provided by 'volunteer professional' teams (are not career positions or paid but must meet minimum industry-accepted standards at or above their paid counterparts), who may also respond via mutual aid or automatic aid to incidents out-of-county, out-of-state and into national parks, via intrastate, interstate, and national park agreements, as well as via the FEMA NIMS national mutual aid deployment system. Parks with paid teams include Denali National Park, Yosemite National Park, Grand Teton National Park, and Mount Rainier National Park. Many paid and volunteer professional mountain SAR teams are part of the Mountain Rescue Association (MRA) and operate under the authority of the local sheriff's department (approximately 42 of the 50 states) or state police or emergency management agency. Member teams are required to regularly reaccredit in three disciplines: technical rope rescue, snow and ice rescue operations, and search management/tracking. While teams are primarily responsible to operate in one county which could be from 50 square miles to 20,000 square miles, they typically respond to adjoining counties and states. Under the National Incident Management System, mountain rescue unit qualifications are standardized for those units which choose to be deployable for national disasters and national mutual aid outside their jurisdiction.

== See also ==
- International Mountain Rescue Day
- Helicopter rescue basket
- SAR dog
- St. Bernard (dog)
- Wilderness first aid
