= Mad River Glen =

Ski resort in Vermont, United States

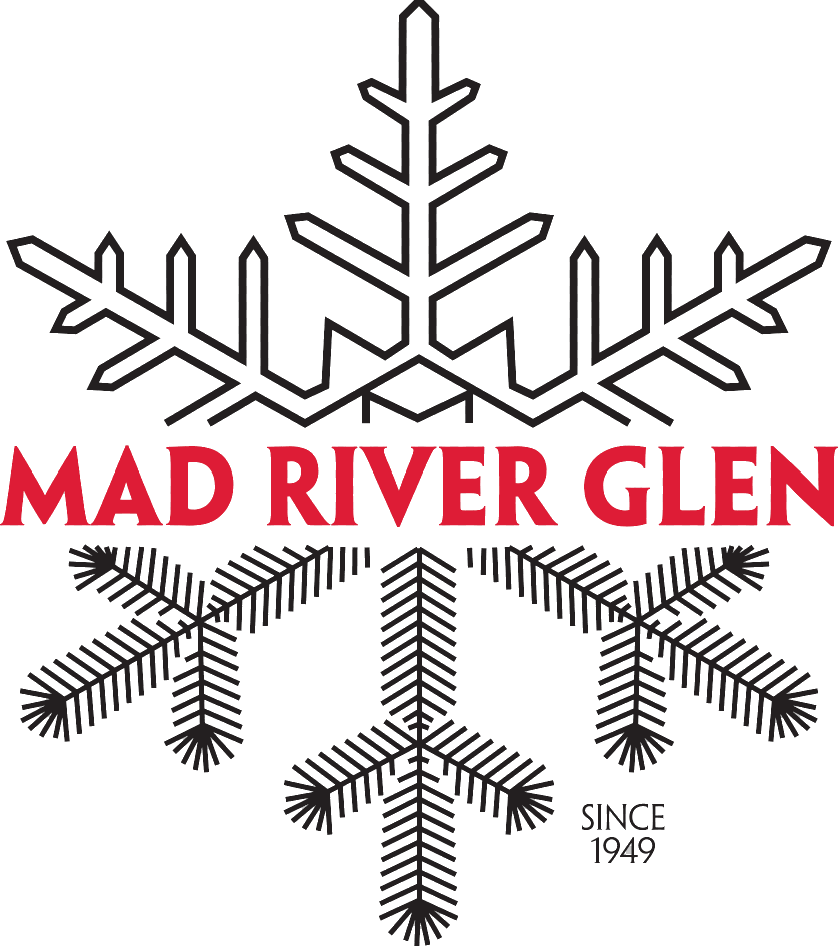

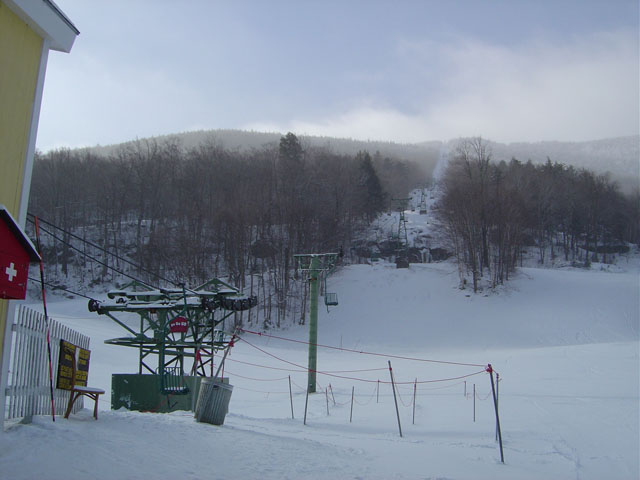
- The Single Chair at Mad River Glen (prior to rehabilitation)
- Interactive map of Mad River Glen
- Location: Fayston, Vermont
- Coordinates: 44°12′03″N 72°55′28″W
- Vertical: 2,037 ft (621 m)
- Top elevation: 3,637 ft (1,109 m)
- Base elevation: 1,600 ft (490 m)
- Trails: 60
- Lift system: 4 chairlifts (3 doubles, 1 single): 1 surface lift
- Terrain parks: Yes
- Snowfall: 250 in. - (635 cm)
- Snowmaking: 15%
- Night skiing: no
- Website: Official website
- Mad River Glen Ski Area Historic District
- U.S. National Register of Historic Places
- U.S. Historic district
- Location within Vermont Location within the United States
- Built: 1947
- Architect: Roland Palmedo et al.
- Architectural style: Modern
- NRHP reference No.: 12000409
- Added to NRHP: July 5, 2012

Mad River Glen is a ski area in Fayston, Vermont. Located within the Green Mountain range, it sits in the Mad River Valley. Though not considered a large ski area, it has a vertical drop of 2,000 feet (610 m), which ranks 14th in New England, and its terrain was ranked by Ski magazine as the most challenging on the east coast of the United States.

Mad River Glen averages over 150 inches (380 cm) of snow a year and maintains a traditional form of New England skiing that emphasizes snow preservation on narrow trails with little grooming instead of man-made snow on wide boulevards. It has one of only two single chairlifts left in the country and does not allow snowboarding.

It is one of a very limited number of ski cooperatives. Individuals purchase publicly available shares and attend regular "Town Hall" meetings, voting on issues regarding the area and management of the cooperative.

== History ==
Mad River Glen was founded in 1947 by Roland Palmedo who led a group of investors that included members of the Rockefeller family. Palmedo was one of the founders of the Mt. Mansfield Lift Company which built the first chairlift at Stowe Mountain Resort. Palmedo wanted to create a ski area for dedicated skiers, with a minimum of commercial interests and amenities. The Single Chair was completed and first operated in 1948. Additionally, five trails (Catamount, Chute, Fall Line, Porcupine, and Grand Canyon) and a small base lodge (still referred to as the "basebox") were also completed at that time. Over the next few decades, 3 double chairlifts and a rope tow for a children's learning area, and many new trails were added.

In 1972, the ski area was bought by Truxton Pratt, then passed on to his wife, Betsy, after his death in 1975. It remained relatively unchanged until she sold it in 1995 to a group of skiers who formed a cooperative to own and manage the ski area. On December 5, 1995, the Mad River Glen Cooperative was formed. Mad River Glen is now the only cooperatively owned ski area in America. In April 1998 the Mad River Glen Cooperative fulfilled its purchase agreement with the previous owner by selling its 1,667th share.

In 2012, Mad River Glen was listed on the National Register of Historic Places as a historic district.

== Management ==
The cooperative holds annual elections for a board of trustees, who oversee the management and business of the ski area. They also hire a general manager to handle day-to-day operations.

Matt Lillard, formerly of Okemo, Magic Mountain (Vt.), and Eaglecrest (Alaska), took over as GM in 2017.

Mad River Glen is one of two ski areas in the country to use a chairlift that seats just one person at a time. The other single chairlift is operated at Mt. Eyak which is located and owned by the City of Cordova, Alaska, and operated by the Sheridan Ski Club.

== Meteorology ==
Mad River Glen is situated on the backbone of the Green Mountains. The elevation allows for cooler air and more precipitation than the surrounding terrain. The highest ridge of the Green Mountains not only gets the same snow that blankets the rest of New England but also picks up significant "backlash" snow after the storms have passed. Strong northwest winds behind the storms pick up moisture from Lake Champlain and are forced rapidly upward on their perpendicular ride over the Greens. This "orographic enhancement" of snowfall is the primary reason that Mad River Glen and similar locations often average triple the snowfall of many lower elevations areas of northern New England. Local meteorologist Josh Fox runs the Single Chair Weather Blog (inspired by the famous single chair) that tracks upcoming weather during the winter months of Mad River Glen and the surrounding area.

== Trails and Lifts ==
Mad River Glen offers 60 trails with a wide variety of difficulties. Beginner-friendly trails can be found in the Birdland area, while steeper, moguled, and wooded trails can generally be found higher up on the mountain. They have been kept much as they were when they were first cut (often by the skiers themselves decades ago), and many are gladed and have natural features lying under the snow; rocks, logs, bushes, etc.

Single chair seen from above

Mad River Glen also has four chairlifts, including Mad River's signature lift, the Single Chair. Mad River Glen is one of two areas in America that still have an active single chair.

Lift Name	Type	Builder	Built	Vertical (feet)	Length (feet)	Notes
Single Chair	Single	American Steel & Wire Company / Doppelmayr CTEC	1948	2037	5234	Only single chair in the east coast, retrofitted by Doppelmayr CTEC in 2007. Has a mid-station.
Sunnyside	Double	Müller	1961	1405	4300	Mid-station installed in 2024
Birdland	Double	Müller	1966	500	2400	
Practice Slope	Double	Müller	1972	300	1319	

== Snowboarding ==
Mad River Glen is one of three ski areas in the U.S. that completely ban snowboarding, along with Utah's Deer Valley and Alta ski areas. This has caused significant discussion, especially among the snowboarding community.

Mad River Glen was one of the first places in the U.S. to allow snowboarding, during the 1986–87 season; the policy lasted until the 1992–93 season. Unloading issues due to a flat run-off exiting the old single chair led the owner of the resort to limit them to the Sunnyside Double and the practice area chair. Due to heated debate over this issue, Betsy Pratt, Mad River Glen's previous owner, decided to ban snowboards entirely.

Four years later the owner sold the mountain to the Mad River Glen Cooperative. The co-op addressed the snowboard ban with a vote. Over 75% voted to keep the ban, and it will take a 2/3 majority to overturn that, making it unlikely that the ban will be lifted soon.

== Telemark ==
Mad River Glen has a large proportion of telemark skiers.

== Kent Thomas Nature Center ==
The Kent Thomas Nature Center features interpretive displays about the mountain's ecology, wildlife, and geology. The center is open year-round and offers natural history programs with trained naturalists.

== See also ==
- National Register of Historic Places listings in Washington County, Vermont
- National Register of Historic Places listings in Chittenden County, Vermont
