= National Ski Patrol =

United States service and safety education organization

The National Ski Patrol System
- Formation: 1938
- Legal status: Congressionally chartered non-profit organization
- Purpose: Outdoor recreation safety
- Headquarters: Lakewood, Colorado, U.S.
- Website: www.nsp.org

The nonprofit National Ski Patrol (NSP) is the largest winter education organization in the world. The NSP provides education, outreach, and credentialing related to outdoor recreation and safety. It is currently composed of more than 31,000 members who serve in over 650 patrols. NSP members, both volunteer and paid, ensure the safety of outdoor recreation enthusiasts in ski areas throughout the United States of America and certain military areas of Europe. For its dedication to the promotion of public safety in skiing and other winter sports, the group was granted a congressional charter under Title 36 of the United States Code in 1980.

== History ==
The National Ski Patrol was founded in 1938 in Stowe, Vermont, when the president of the National Ski Association, Roger Langley convinced the founder and leader of the Mt. Mansfield Ski Patrol, Charles Minot Dole, to form a national ski patrol. Dole was convinced of the need for a national ski rescue organization due to both the loss of a friend due to injuries suffered in a ski-related accident the year prior and an on-slope accident in which he was seriously injured. With Roger Langley's assistance, Charles Minot Dole organized and formed the National Ski Patrol Committee of the National Ski Association. The resulting organization became the National Ski Patrol. Upon his retirement in 1950 as president, Dole had built the NSP into an organization of 300 ski patrols and 4,000 members. By 1960, the volunteer-driven organization was providing first aid to approximately 20,000 skiers annually.

Since its founding, the National Ski Patrol has worked closely with other countries in outdoor emergency care education, and has assisted in establishing ski patrol organizations in Canada, Korea, New Zealand, Israel, Turkey, Argentina, and Chile, as well as the Victorian Rescue Service in Australia. In addition to its ski safety programs, it works closely with the United States Ski Team, Professional Ski Instructors of America, US Forest Service, National Park Service, and other organizations and agencies in the promotion of skiing and ski safety.

=== Activities During World War II ===
Beginning in February 1940, Charles Minot Dole began writing to officials in the United States Army and the War Department about the need for specialized mountain troops. Dole had been inspired by Finnish efforts during the Winter War and believed the United States should train specialized soldiers to fight in winter and alpine conditions. Due to the lobbying efforts by Charles Minot Dole, in November 1941 the National Ski Patrol was appointed by the United States Army to recruit and vet soldiers for the 87th Mountain Infantry Regiment. The National Ski Patrol continued in this capacity until February 1944, by which time it had recruited around 8,000 soldiers for the 87th Regiment and eventually the 10th Mountain Division. The National Ski Patrol also assisted in training for the new troops.

== Membership ==
Membership within the NSP falls under five individual categories: patrollers, medical associates, alumni members, associate members, and mountain hosts. Patrollers are those members who are actively involved in providing emergency care to injured guests and are members of a local patrol affiliated with the NSP. Medical associates are physicians who volunteer their time to assist with the medical training of patrollers. Patrollers who are no longer actively involved in providing emergency care to injured guests are able to maintain their affiliation with the NSP as alumni members. Associate members are personnel who are interested in courses offered by the NSP but are not members of a ski patrol. The mountain host category of membership is reserved for individuals who participate in on mountain customer service, are expected to be able to render first aid, but are not part of an organization's ski patrol.

== Educational Programs ==
Under its mission of promoting outdoor recreation safety, the NSP has developed a number of educational programs designed to increase safety awareness and injury prevention.

=== Transportation ===
The transportation education program is designed to teach members of the NSP safe techniques for the transportation of sick or injured guests from the wilderness to safety. Specific skills taught through the NSP system include safe toboggan handling, ski enhancement, and snowboard enhancement.

=== Avalanche Program ===
The NSP began instructing ski patrollers and other search and rescue personnel in avalanche safety in 1957, making it the oldest and most experienced provider of avalanche education. In addition to courses designed for the ski patroller and the search and rescue personnel, the NSP offers avalanche education to the general public. NSP avalanche education courses are based on a curriculum developed in conjunction with the American Avalanche Association.

=== Mountain Travel and Rescue ===
Developed to improve the safety of non-patroller outdoor enthusiasts, the mountain travel and rescue program emphasizes skills necessary to survive in the wilderness These skills include nutrition, wilderness physiology, weather patterns, survival skills, group dynamics, navigation, and basic search and rescue skills. This program is designed to ensure that those who venture into the wilderness have the necessary skills to do so safely.

== Ski Patrollers ==
A ski patroller with a rescue toboggan in tow

Patrollers are those members of the NSP who, as part of a ski patrol organization, provide assistance to ill or injured guests at a mountain area. To recognize and develop a continued commitment to patroller education and excellence, the NSP classifies patrollers based on completion of NSP-approved courses. The classification schema is as follows:

- Candidate refers to a member who has just joined but has not passed the Outdoor Emergency Care course.
- Patroller refers to any member of a patrol organization who has completed the Outdoor Emergency Care course. Unlike other classifications, ski or snowboarding skills are not necessary. While patrollers may provide first aid and assistance to ill or injured guests, they are not authorized to transport guests in rescue toboggans.
- Alpine Patroller and Nordic Patroller: are classifications used for patrollers who have passed the Outdoor Emergency Care course and have completed transportation education and are authorized to transport ill or injured guests in rescue toboggans. Alpine patroller refers to those patrollers who are authorized to transport patients in rescue toboggans while using alpine skiing (downhill) equipment. Nordic patroller refers to those patrollers who are authorized to transport patients in rescue toboggans while using Nordic skiing (cross-country) equipment.
- Senior Patroller refers to those patrollers who have completed additional training in emergency management in addition to that taught through Outdoor Emergency Care. A senior patroller may or may not be authorized to transport ill or injured guests in rescue toboggans. Those who have previously completed transportation education (alpine and Nordic patrollers) maintain this ability, whereas those who have not (patrollers) may not transport guests.
- Senior Alpine Patroller and Senior Nordic Patroller are alpine patrollers and Nordic patrollers who have completed additional training in emergency management (that taught to senior patrollers) and who have completed additional transportation education and can demonstrate skills not required of the alpine or Nordic patroller.
- Certified Patroller and Master Nordic Patroller refer to the highest level of certification offered by the NSP for alpine and Nordic patrollers, respectively. In addition to emergency management and transportation skills, certified patrollers and master Nordic patrollers must demonstrate excellence in all areas of patrol operations, including avalanche safety and resort management.
- Young Adult Patroller is a program that provides a learning environment where young adults can develop skills and knowledge to become Patrollers. Young Adult Patrollers (YAP) are NSP members (ages 15 through high school graduation) who complete all of the required training and responsibilities of adult members of their patrol, we well as special training and events geared towards the YAPs within the region.

== See also ==
- Association of Professional Patrollers
