= Charles Minot Dole =

Founder of the American National Ski Patrol

Charles Minot "Minnie" Dole (April 18, 1899 – March 14, 1976) was the founder of the National Ski Patrol. He also played a major role in the creation of the first American mountain unit, the 10th Mountain Division.

== Biography ==
Dole was born April 18, 1899, in Tyngsboro, Massachusetts. He learned how to ski in the Boy Scouts of America and attended Phillips Academy. Though he enlisted in the US Army during World War I, the war finished before he completed his basic training. Following the War, he graduated from Yale University in 1923. He became a successful insurance executive, and made his home in Greenwich, Connecticut with an office in New York City.

Minnie Dole formed the National Ski Patrol in 1938 and was director of the organization until 1950.

Inspired by the resistance of the Finnish ski troops against the Soviet Union in the Winter War, following a discussion with three other veteran skiers February 1940 in Vermont, Dole was convinced of the need for an American military unit trained in mountain combat. He spent the following months lobbying the War Department to create such a unit, and found a receptive audience with Secretary of War Henry Stimson, and with his support from met with the army chief of staff General George C. Marshall 9 September. General Marshall proved receptive to the idea, although the initial response was to train various units in cross country skiing. It was not until 15 November 1941 the War Department announced it would create the 1st Battalion (Reinforced), 87th Infantry Mountain Regiment, which would become the 10th Mountain Division.

Dole continued to advocate and influence on behalf of this division until late 1944 when its new commander, Lieutenant General George Hays, wrote in response to a complaint Dole made on behalf of the division that he was its commander, responsible for its welfare, and concluded, "I shall brook no interference whatsoever." Dole received the rebuff without acrimony, telling a friend, "After all, Hays is the commander. He's the one that will take them into battle, not me."

Dole appeared as himself on the January 10, 1966 episode of the CBS game show To Tell the Truth. He received three of four possible votes.

Dole died March 14, 1976, in Greenwich, Connecticut.

== Legacy ==
Dole is honored across the ski industry with plaques and other honors. A trail was dedicated in his honor at Berkshire East Ski Area. Dole was inducted into the United States National Ski Hall of Fame in 1958. His achievements are honoured in the song 'Ski Patrol', featured on Bob Gibson's 1959 album Ski Songs.

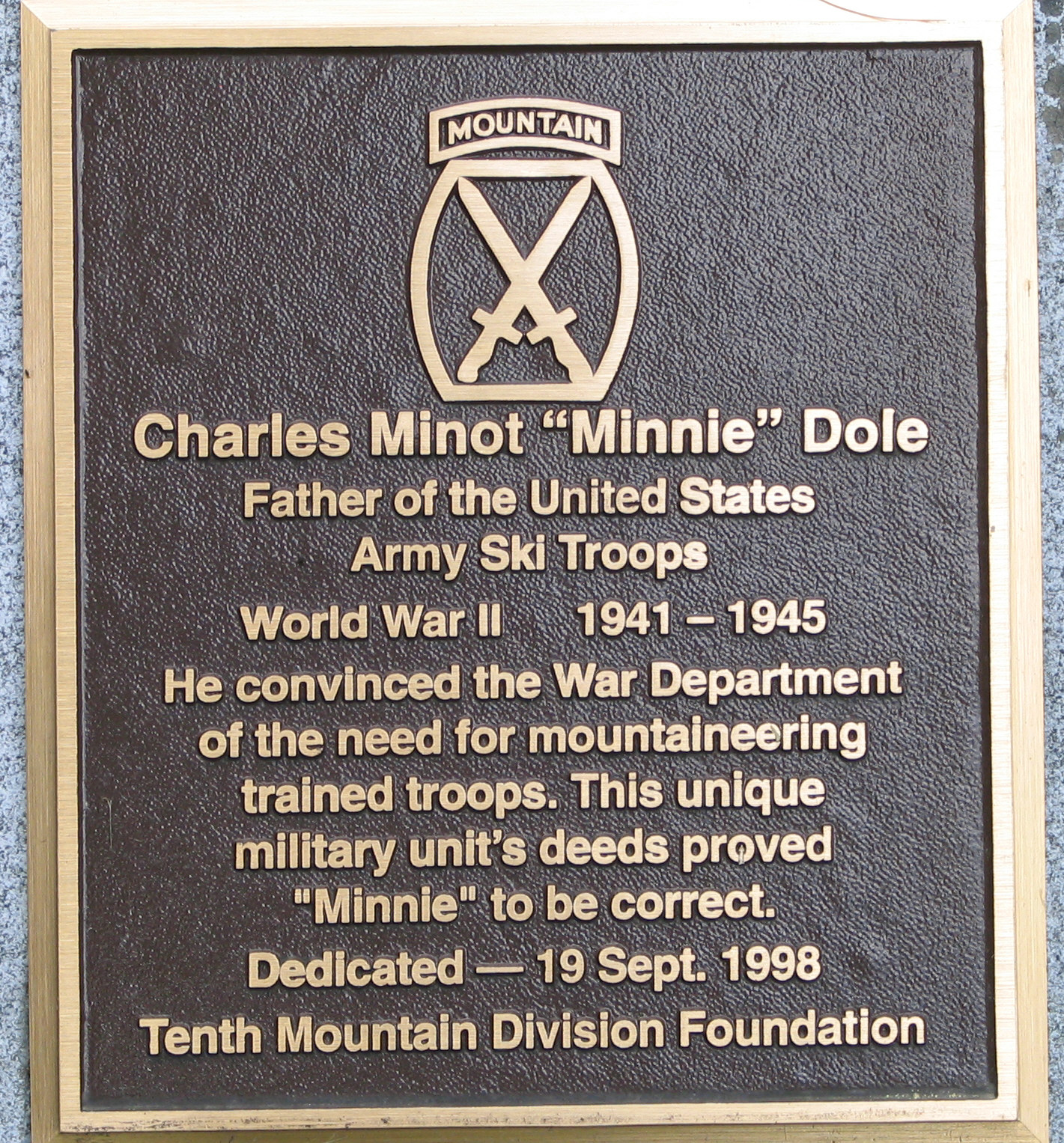
Grave marker at St. John’s in the Wilderness Episcopal Church, Paul Smiths, New York

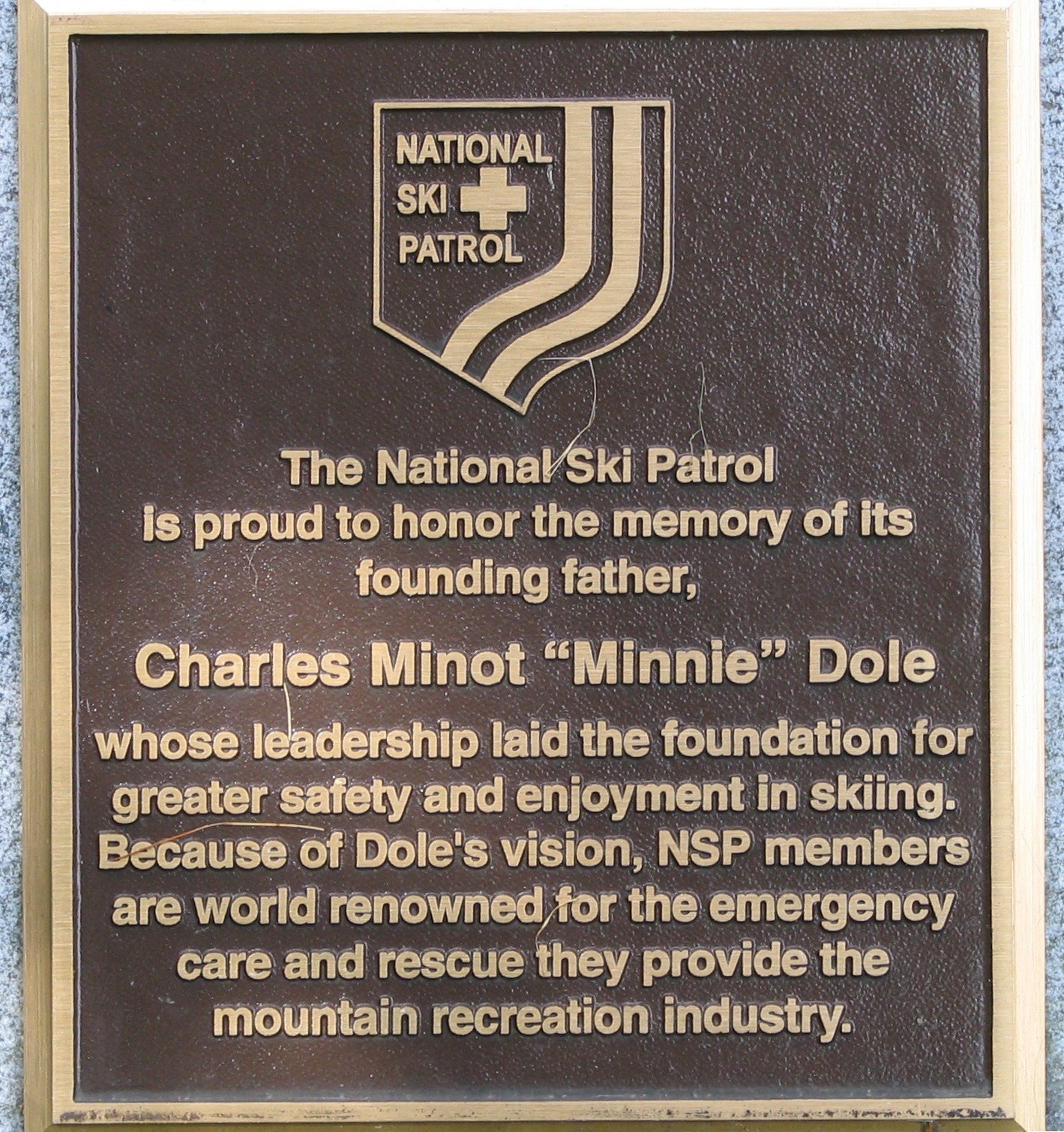
Second grave marker
