= Prime Minister's Prizes for Science =

The Prime Minister's Prizes for Science are annual Australian awards for outstanding achievements in scientific research, innovation, and teaching. The prizes have been awarded since 2000, when they replaced the Australia Prize for science.

The major awards are the Prime Minister's Prize for Science, regarded as the national award for the advancement of knowledge through science, and the Prime Minister's Prize for Innovation (created in 2015), as the national award for translation of science into commercial outcomes. In 2016, an additional Prize for New Innovators was also created.

The Frank Fenner Prize for Life Scientist of the Year (previously known as the Science Minister's Prize for Science) and the Malcolm McIntosh Prize for Physical Scientist of the Year were also created in 2000. Prizes for excellence in science teaching at primary and secondary schools were added in 2002.

== Awards ==
=== Prime Minister's Prize for Science ===
The recipient(s) of this prize can be an individual or jointly up to four individuals, if the achievement is the result of a collaborative team effort. The recipient receives AUD 250,000, an embossed solid gold medallion and lapel pin.

Prizewinners

Source:Department of Industry, Innovation and Science

- 2025 – Lidia Morawska For pioneering research that has transformed how the world understands air pollution and airborne transmission of disease
- 2024 – Matthew Bailes For his discovery of Fast Radio Bursts
- 2023 – Michelle Simmons For creating the new field of atomic electronics
- 2022 – Trevor McDougall For discovering four new ocean mixing processes and his work defining the thermodynamic properties of seawater
- 2021 – Edward C. Holmes For his transformative role in the scientific response to COVID-19
- 2020 – David McClelland, Susan Scott, Peter Veitch and David Blair (OzGrav collaboration) For critical contributions to the first direct detection of gravitational waves
- 2019 – Cheryl Praeger For her fundamental work in group theory and combinatorics
- 2018 – Kurt Lambeck For transforming our understanding of our living planet
- 2017 – Jenny Graves For her pioneering investigations of the genetics of sex
- 2016 – Richard Shine For his work using evolutionary principles to address conservation challenges
- 2015 – Graham Farquhar For modelling photosynthesis, the world’s most important biological reaction
- 2014 – Sam Berkovic and Ingrid Scheffer jointly For their contribution to the study of epilepsy, its diagnosis, management and treatment
- 2013 – Terry Speed For his contribution to making sense of genomics and related technologies (using statistics)
- 2012 – Ken Freeman For his founding of [...] galactic archaeology
- 2011 – Ezio Rizzardo and David Solomon For their role in revolutionizing polymer science
- 2010 – John Shine For his scientific research and research leadership
- 2009 – John O'Sullivan For his achievements in astronomy and wireless technologies
- 2008 – Ian Frazer For his creation of the first vaccine designed to protect against a cancer
- 2007 – Peter Waterhouse and Ming-Bo Wang For their discovery of how to silence genes in plants
- 2006 – Mandyam Veerambudi Srinivasan For research that has revealed the working of the insect mind, and helped redefine robotics research
- 2005 – David Boger For a lifetime of pioneering work in fluid mechanics
- 2004 – Graeme Clark For the discoveries which led to the bionic ear
- 2003 – Jacques Miller For discovery of the role of the thymus in the immune system; and discovery that mammals have two types of white bloods cells
- 2002 – Frank Fenner (deceased) For eradication of smallpox, and the trialling and release of the rabbit myxoma virus
- 2001 – Donald Metcalf For discovery and development of hormones called “colony stimulating factors” which stimulate the formation of white blood cells
- 2000 – Jim Peacock and Liz Dennis For discovery of the Flowering Switch Gene, a key gene in determining when plants end their vegetative growth phase and begin flowering

=== Prime Minister's Prize for Innovation ===
The recipient(s) of this prize can be an individual or jointly up to four individuals, if the commercialisation is the result of a collaborative team effort. The recipient receives AUD 250,000, an embossed solid gold medallion and lapel pin.

Prizewinners

Source:Department of Industry, Innovation and Science

- 2025 – Vikram Sharma
- 2024 – Andrew F Wilks and Chris Burns
- 2023 – Glenn King
- 2022 – Alison Todd and Elisa Mokany
- 2022 – Nick Cutmore, James Tickner and Dirk Treasure at Chrysos Corporation and CSIRO For the commercialisation of PhotonAssay
- 2021 – Anthony Steven Weiss For his pioneering research and commercialisation of synthetic tropoelastin-based biomaterials, which can accelerate and improve the repair of human tissue
- 2020 – Thomas Maschmeyer – His work on translating fundamental research into two pioneering technologies
- 2019 – The Walter and Eliza Hall Institute team For the development of the leukemia drug venetoclax
- 2018 – Simon Poole, Andrew Bartos, Glenn Baxter and Steven Frisken For creating and commercialising technologies that underpin the global internet
- 2017 – Eric Reynolds For inventing and commercialising Recaldent
- 2016 – Michael Aitken For creating and commercialising tools that are making markets fair and efficient
- 2015 – Graeme Jameson For his development of floatation technologies that have added billions of dollars to the value of Australia’s mineral and energy industries

=== Prize for Aboriginal and Torres Strait Islander Knowledge Systems ===
This prize, valued at AUD 250 000, was first awarded in 2025.

Prizewinners

- 2025 – Michael Wear For his marine conservation work

=== Prize for New Innovators ===
This prize is awarded only to an individual and the recipient receives AUD 50 000, a silver medallion and lapel pin.

Prizewinners

Source:Department of Industry, Innovation and Science

- 2025 – Nikhilesh Bappoo
- 2024 – Andrew Horsley
- 2023 – Lara Herrero
- 2022 – Brett Hallam
- 2022 – Pip Karoly
- 2021 – Michael Bowen For his work in the discovery and development of KNX100
- 2020 – Justin Chalker For inventing a new class of polymers
- 2019 – Luke Campbell For inventing the nuraphone, headphones that adapt to an individual's unique sense of hearing
- 2018 – Geoff Rogers For creating and commercialising his pioneering biomedical engineering
- 2016 – Colin Hall For his contribution to a new manufacturing technology

=== Frank Fenner Prize for Life Scientist of the Year ===
This award is for early to mid-career scientists, not more than ten years or full-time equivalent past the award of their highest degree (e.g. Master's or PhD), working in the life sciences. The recipient receives $50,000, a medal and a lapel pin.

Prizewinners

- 2025 – David Khoury
- 2024 – Britta Regli-von Ungern-Sternberg
- 2023 – Chris Greening
- 2022 – Si Ming Man
- 2021 – Sherene Loi For translating scientific findings into innovative treatments that can improve the survival of breast cancer patients in Australia and around the world
- 2020 – Mark Dawson For pioneering research in the field of epigenetics and its impact on human health and disease
- 2019 – Laura Mackay For her leadership in the field of immunological memory
- 2018 – Lee Berger For solving the global mystery of disappearing frogs and challenging paradigms about wildlife health
- 2017 – Jian Yang For creating ways to understand inherited traits and the human genome
- 2016 – Kerrie Wilson For optimising the global allocation of scarce conservation resources
- 2015 – Jane Elith For her contributions to environmental management worldwide
- 2014 – Ryan Lister For his contribution to the understanding of gene regulation and its potential ability to change agriculture and the treatment of disease and mental health
- 2013 – Angela Moles For transforming our understanding of the ecosystems and overturning some of the dogmas of ecology
- 2012 – Mark Shackleton For identifying and isolating stem cells in the female mammary gland to develop a fully functional breast
- 2011 – Min Chen For her contribution to our knowledge of chlorophyll and cyanobacteria
- 2010 – Benjamin Kile For his achievements in molecular genetics
- 2009 – Michael Cowley For his contribution to our understanding of metabolism and obesity
- 2008 – Carola Vinuesa For her contributions to immunology
- 2007 – Elizabeth (Beth) Fulton For her leadership in mathematics and ecosystem modeling
- 2006 – James Whisstock For his discoveries of novel serpins, and his research leadership in protein biology
- 2005 – Harvey Millar For his leadership in plant biochemistry
- 2004 – Jamie Rossjohn For his leadership in structural biology and X-ray crystallography
- 2003 – Christopher Helliwell For isolating the genes that control the biosynthesis of gibberellin, a plant hormone that controls plant growth
- 2002 – Joel Mackay For his discovery of new methods of controlling DNA transcription to repair malfunctioning genes
- 2001 – Bostjan Kobe For research contributions that have increased our understanding of protein interaction and cellular processes
- 2000 – Una M. Ryan For DNA detection and characterisation methods for the parasites Cryptosporidium and Giardia

=== Malcolm McIntosh Prize for Physical Scientist of the Year ===
This award is for early to mid-career scientists, not more than ten years or full-time equivalent past the award of their highest degree (e.g. Master's or PhD), working in the physical sciences. The recipient receives $50,000, a medal and a lapel pin.

Prizewinners

- 2025 – Yao Zheng
- 2024 – Tianyi Ma
- 2023 – Yuerui (Larry) Lu
- 2022 – Adele Morrison
- 2021 – Keith Bannister For his pioneering research into fast radio bursts
- 2020 – Xiaojing Hao For her research into solar cells made from 'sulphide kesterite'
- 2019 – Elizabeth New For pioneering new chemical imaging tools to observe healthy and diseased cells
- 2018 – Jack Clegg For creating flexible crystals and new separation technologies
- 2017 – Dayong Jin For creating new technologies to image the processes of life
- 2016 – Richard Payne For his revolutionary drug development technologies
- 2015 – Cyrille Boyer For his contribution to polymer science, nanotechnology and nanomedicine
- 2014 – Matthew Hill For his work in the development of metal-organic frameworks for practical industrial applications
- 2013 – Andrea Morello For intellectual leadership in developing a trillion-dollar global industry, the building blocks of a quantum computer, a working prototype silicon component to make quantum computing possible
- 2012 – Eric May For significant research in the field of natural gas processing
- 2011 – Stuart Wyithe For his work on the physics of the formation of the Universe
- 2010 – Katherine Trinajstic For her early career achievements in palaeontology
- 2009 – Amanda Barnard For her achievements in modelling nanoparticles
- 2008 – Tanya Monro For her leadership in photonics
- 2007 – Mark Cassidy For his leadership in offshore civil engineering
- 2006 – Naomi McClure-Griffiths For her insight into the structure of our galaxy, and her research leadership
- 2005 – Cameron Kepert For his leadership in chemistry and molecular nanoscience
- 2004 – Ben Eggleton For pioneering research in photonics and optical physics
- 2003 – Howard Wiseman For advancing our understanding of the physical effect of observations in quantum system monitoring and measurement
- 2002 – Marcela Bilek For the design and fabrication of plasma processing devices and new materials using thin film lamination technology
- 2001 – Peter Bartlett For his research into artificial intelligence and discoveries in the area of machine learning and information processing
- 2000 – Brian Schmidt For his leadership of an international team that uncovered evidence that the universe was expanding at an accelerating rate.

=== Prime Minister's Prize for Excellence in Science Teaching in Primary Schools ===
This prize is awarded to an individual who has made a significant contribution to teaching science at a primary school level. The recipient is awarded $50,000, a medal and lapel pin. Department of Industry, Innovation and Science

Prizewinners

- 2025 – Paula Taylor
- 2024 – Daniel Edwards
- 2023 – Judith Stutchbury (Qld)
- 2022 – George Pantazis (WA)
- 2021 – Megan Hayes (Qld)
- 2020 – Sarah Fletcher (ACT)
- 2019 – Sarah Finney (SA)
- 2018 – Brett Crawford (Qld)
- 2017 – Neil Bramsen (NSW)
- 2016 – Gary Tilley (NSW)
- 2015 – Rebecca Johnson (Qld)
- 2014 – Brian Schiller (SA)
- 2013 – Richard Johnson (WA)
- 2012 – Michael van der Ploeg (Tas)
- 2011 – Brooke Topelberg (WA)
- 2010 – Matthew McCloskey (NSW)
- 2009 – Allan Whittome (WA)
- 2008 – Bronwyn Mart (SA)
- 2007 – Cheryl Capra (Qld)
- 2006 – Marjorie Colvill (Tas)
- 2005 – Mark Merritt (WA)
- 2004 – Alwyn Powell (Qld)
- 2003 – Sarah Tennant (NSW)
- 2002 – Marianne Nicholas (SA)

=== Prime Minister's Prize for Excellence in Science Teaching in Secondary Schools ===
This prize is awarded to an individual who has made a significant contribution to teaching science at a secondary school level. The recipient is awarded $50,000, a medal and lapel pin. Department of Industry, Innovation and Science

Prizewinners

- 2025 – Matt Dodds (NSW)
- 2024 – Alice Leung (NSW)
- 2023 – Donna Buckley (WA)
- 2022 – Veena Nair (VIC)
- 2021 – Scott Graham (NSW)
- 2020 – Darren Hamley (WA)
- 2019 – Samantha Moyle (SA)
- 2018 – Scott Sleap (NSW)
- 2017 – Brett McKay (NSW)
- 2016 – Suzy Urbaniak (WA)
- 2015 – Ken Silburn (NSW)
- 2014 – Geoff McNamara (ACT)
- 2013 – Sarah Chapman (Qld)
- 2012 – Anita Trenwith (SA)
- 2011 – Jane Wright (SA)
- 2010 – Debra Smith (Qld)
- 2009 – Len Altman (SA)
- 2008 – Clay Reid (SA)
- 2007 – Francesca Calati (Vic)
- 2006 – Anna Davis (NSW)
- 2005 – Mike Roach (SA)
- 2004 – Mark Butler (NSW)
- 2003 – Pam Garnett (WA)
- 2002 – Ruth Dircks (NSW)

== History of the Prime Minister's Prizes for Science ==
=== Australia Prize recipients ===
- 1990 – Agriculture or the environment theme – Allen Kerr, Eugene Nester and Jeff Schell
- 1991 – No Awards presented
- 1992 – Mining or processing of mineral resources theme – John Watt, Brian Sowerby, Nicholas Cutmore and Jim Howarth
- 1993 – Sensory perception theme – Horace Barlow, Peter Bishop and Vernon Mountcastle
- 1994 – Sustainable land management theme – Gene Likens
- 1995 – Remote sensing theme – Kenneth G. McCracken, Andrew Green, Jonathon Huntington, Richard Moore
- 1996 – Pharmaceutical design theme – Paul Janssen, Graeme Laver, Peter Colman and Mark von Itzstein
- 1997 – Telecommunications theme- Allan Snyder, Rodney Tucker and Gottfried Ungerboeck
- 1998 – Molecular science theme – Elizabeth Blackburn, Suzanne Cory, Alec Jeffreys and Grant Sutherland
- 1999 – Energy science and technology theme – Martin A. Green and Stuart R. Wenham

== See also ==
- List of general science and technology awards
