= Australasian College of Tropical Medicine =

Australasian medical association

The Australasian College of Tropical Medicine
- Abbreviation: ACTM
- Formation: 1991
- Purpose: Tropical Medicine
- Headquarters: Brisbane
- Location: Australia
- Region served: Australia and New Zealand
- Official language: English
- President: Professor Richard Franklin
- Key people: Professor Rick Speare AM; Professor Peter A Leggat, AM
- Affiliations: International Federation for Tropical Medicine
- Website: www.tropmed.org

The Australasian College of Tropical Medicine, more commonly known by its acronym ACTM is an Australasian medical association founded by 10 interested clinicians, scientists and researchers at the Anton Breinl Centre in Townsville, Australia on 29 May 1991. The ACTM is a preeminent professional organisation in tropical medicine in the Australasian region and claims to have more than 800 fellows and members worldwide. The ACTM is committed to the development of tropical medicine and is working with professionals to help manage the global burden of tropical disease and injury through networking, research and development. The ACTM Secretriat is based at AMA House, Brisbane. The current president of ACTM is Professor Richard Franklin and the immediate past president is Prof Colleen Lau - MBBS (UWA), MPHTM (JCU), PhD (UQ), FRACGP, FACTM from the University of Queensland School of Public Health.

== History ==
The ACTM was founded by 10 interested clinicians, scientists and researchers at the Anton Breinl Centre in Townsville, Australia on 29 May 1991. Professor Peter A. Leggat, the College's Inaugural Honorary Secretary (1991–1996), and Professor Rick Speare, the College's Inaugural President (1991–1996), are generally acknowledged as the founder and co-founder of the College, respectively.

Since that time, clinicians, scientists and researchers in the field of tropical medicine from more than 30 countries have become Fellows, Members, Associates or Affiliates of the College. Formerly, The Royal Society of Tropical Medicine and Hygiene (RSTM&H) was the only professional organisation representing the professional interests of those working in tropical medicine in Australasia. The RSTM&H still has approximately 100 members in Australasia and the ACTM and the RSTM&H have co-hosted joint activities in recent years, including a joint Scientific Meeting in 1997 and the RSTM&H Centennial Lecture series commemorating the Centenary of the RSTM&H in 2007 and the Centenary of Tropical Medicine in Australia in 2010. The ACTM is affiliated with the International Federation for Tropical Medicine (IFTM) and now represents member organisations of the IFTM in Australia.

== Aims and content ==
The Aims of the College are to encourage continuing education and the exchange of knowledge in tropical medicine; collaborate with other organisations in conducting activities of mutual concern, interest and direction in tropical medicine; promote research in tropical medicine; strive for professionalism and competence among its members and those specialising in and entering into the field of tropical medicine; and to maintain a historical collection of items relevant to the development of tropical medicine in Australasia.

Today the ACTM is a multi-disciplinary College, which incorporates a Faculty of Travel Medicine (FTM), a Joint Faculty of Expedition and Wilderness Medicine with the Faculty of Travel Medicine, and Standing Committees on Medical Parasitology and Zoonotic Diseases, Publications, Toxinology and Disaster Health, as well as dealing with tropical medicine.

== Journal ==
The ACTM Journal of Tropical Medicine and Infectious Disease is an international, scientific, peer reviewed medical journal published monthly by the Australasian College of Tropical Medicine (ACTM) and its Joint Faculties of Travel Medicine and Expedition and Wilderness Medicine.

== Presidents ==
- 1991–1996 Professor Rick Speare
- 1996–1998 Professor Peter A. Leggat
- 1998–2000 Professor John M. Goldsmid
- 2000–2002 Dr. John L. Heydon
- 2002–2004 Professor Peter A. Leggat
- 2004–2006 Dr. Ken D. Winkel
- 2006–2008 Professor Peter A. Leggat
- 2008–2010 Associate Professor Tim Inglis
- 2010–2012 Associate Professor David Porter
- 2013–2016 Professor John McBride
- 2017–2019 Professor Geoff Quail
- 2020–2022 Professor Peter A Leggat
- 2023–2024 Professor Colleen Lau
- 2024– Now Professor Richard Franklin

== Membership ==
Applications for membership of the ACTM and the FTM (and its Joint Faculty) are evaluated on the basis of the applicant's academic and professional qualifications, experience and contributions to tropical medicine or a related field, usually by way of publications, but other contributions are also considered.

Fellows, Members and Associates of the ACTM are entitled to use the post-nominal letters FACTM, MACTM and AACTM, respectively. Honorary Fellows and Members of the College are entitled to use the postnominal letters Hon. FACTM and Hon. MACTM, respectively. Fellows, Associate Fellows and Members of the FTM are entitled to use the postnominal letters FFTM ACTM, AFFTM ACTM and MFTM ACTM, respectively. Honorary Fellows and Members of the FTM are entitled to use the postnominal letters Hon. FFTM ACTM and Hon. MFTM ACTM, respectively.

New members may receive their College testamurs at a Convocation of the College. The first Convocation was held in 1994 and Convocation XX was held in 2008. College awards and honours are also presented at these Convocations, usually held during a Scientific Meeting of the College.

== Notable members ==
Notable Honorary Fellows of the College include Frank Fenner, Fred Hollows, Rick Speare, John Hemsley Pearn, David Durrheim, Struan Sutherland. Notable Honorary Members of the College include the Anton Breinl Centre, the Royal Flying Doctor Service of Australia, the Royal Society of Tropical Medicine and Hygiene and the World Safety Organization.
