= Anton Breinl Centre =

Coordinates: 19°19′38.23″S 146°45′25.53″E

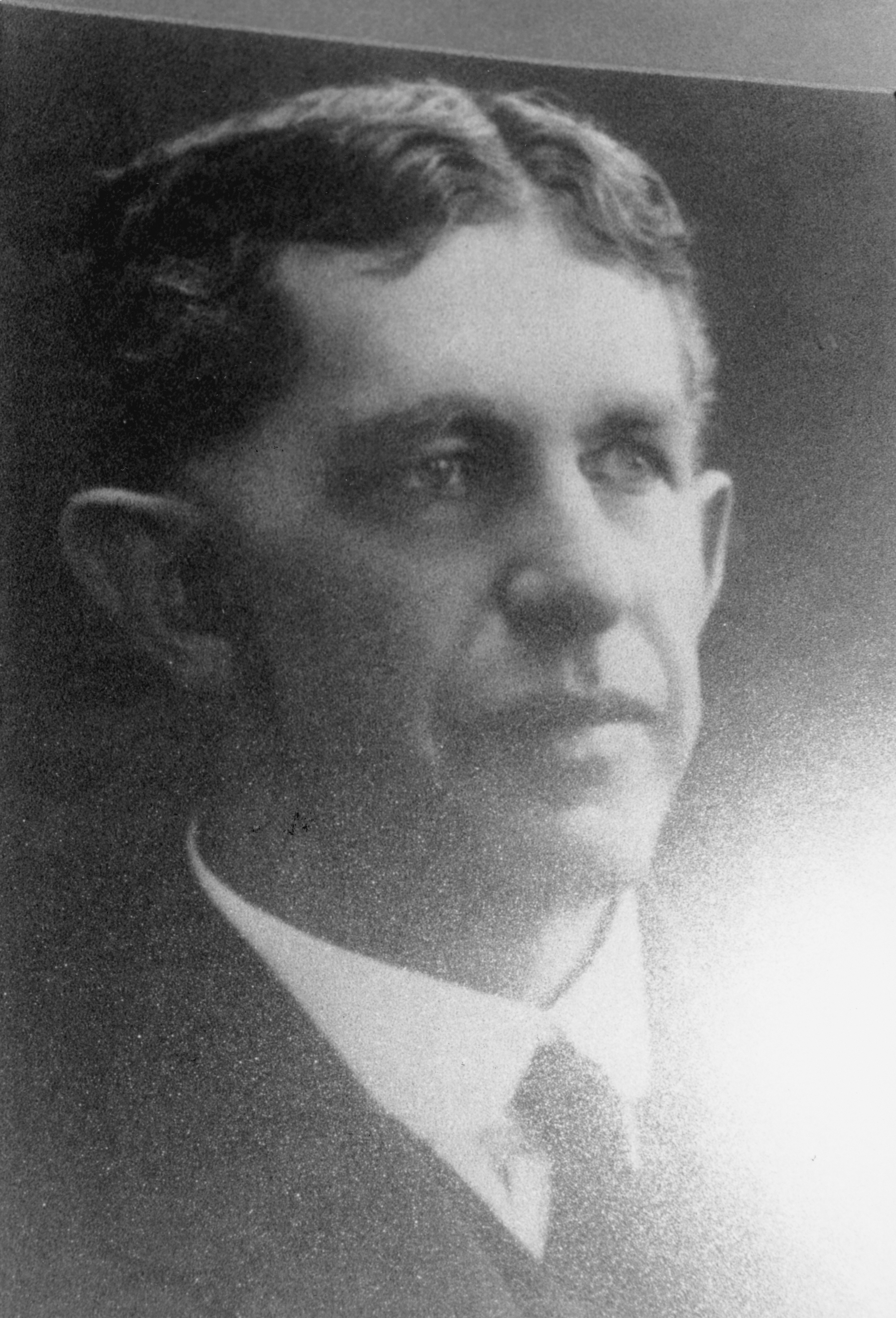
Anton Breinl, 1910

The Anton Breinl Centre for Public Health and Tropical Medicine (Anton Breinl Centre or the ABC) is a constituent discipline of the School of Public Health, Tropical Medicine and Rehabilitation Sciences at James Cook University in Queensland, Australia. It specialises in public health and tropical medicine. The Anton Breinl Centre is one of only eight internationally recognised centres of excellence in tropical medicine worldwide and one of two in the Asia-Pacific Region. The Anton Breinl Centre incorporates a World Health Organization (WHO) Collaborating Centre (CC) for the Elimination of Lymphatic Filariasis and Soil Transmitted Helminthiases (WHO CC Number AUS 68). It also incorporates a World Safety Organization Collaborating Centre, which has several designations, including Disaster Health and Emergency Response, Injury Prevention and Occupational Health and Travel Safety and Health.

The Anton Breinl Centre is a renowned research-led postgraduate centre, which presents unique opportunities for postgraduate study of the major disciplines related to public health and tropical medicine. Anton Breinl Centre also has one of the largest Master of Public Health programs in Australasia and is one of only a small number of Schools in Australia to receive funding from the Commonwealth Public Health Education and Research Program.

== History ==
The Anton Breinl Centre can trace its history back to the establishment of Australia's first medical research institute, the Australian Institute of Tropical Medicine (AITM), in 1910. Dr Anton Breinl, formerly Head of the Runcorn Laboratories of the Liverpool School of Tropical Medicine, was appointed the first Director of the AITM, which was based in Townsville, and commenced work on 1 January 1910. The original AITM building was opened in 1912 and is now heritage-listed.

The AITM was moved to Sydney in 1930 and became incorporated into the Sydney School of Public Health and Tropical Medicine.

Following the release of the Kerr White Report into public health in 1986, a centre for Tropical Health and Medicine was established in 1987 as a Tropical Health Surveillance Unit in Townsville, Australia. The new institute was reestablished in the original AITM Building, which was named the Anton Breinl Centre for Tropical Health and Medicine in 1990, in recognition of the Inaugural Director of the AITM. Apart from its academic pursuits, the Anton Breinl Centre was also the founding site of a new professional organisation, The Australasian College of Tropical Medicine, on 29 May 1991.

The Anton Breinl Centre for Tropical Health and Medicine was renamed the Anton Breinl Centre for Public Health and Tropical Medicine in 1997 in recognition of the growing importance of public health training at the Centre. The Anton Breinl Centre started moving its operations from the original AITM Building in 2004 to the main campus of James Cook University to a new building in the Medical School precinct. A new teaching annex of the Anton Breinl Centre was completed in 2005, as was the move to the main campus.

Anton Breinl Centre Directors

1990–1991: Professor Rick Speare AM; PhD, MBBS (hons), BVSc (Hons), DVSc, FAFPHM, FACTM, MANZCVS

1992–1997: Professor Ian Wronski AO; MBBS, DTM&H, MPH, MSc, FACTM, FRACGP, FACRRM, FAFPHM

1998–2001: Professor Ian Ring AO; MBBS, MSc, MPH, FAFPHM

2002–2004: Professor David Durrheim AM; MBChB, MPH&TM, DTM&H, DCH, DrPH, FAFPHM, FACTM, FAAHMS

2005–2008: Professor Rick Speare AM; PhD, MBBS (hons), BVSc (Hons), DVSc, FAFPHM, FACTM, MANZCVS

It was the foundation from with the Australian institute of Tropical Health and Medicine was launched in 2008.

== Courses offered ==
The following courses are offered by the Anton Breinl Centre:

- Doctor of Public Health (DrPH)
- Doctor of Public Health Studies (DrPHSt)
- Doctor of Philosophy (PhD)
- Master of Public Health and Tropical Medicine (MPH&TM)
- Master of Public Health (MPH), including generic and specialist streams
- Master of Science in Tropical Medical Science (MSc)
- Postgraduate Diploma of Tropical Medicine and Hygiene (DTM&H)
- Postgraduate Diploma of Public Health and Tropical Medicine (DipPH&TM)
- Postgraduate Certificate of Aeromedical Retrieval (PGCAeMedRetrieval)
- Postgraduate Certificate of Disaster and Refugee Health (PGCDisastRefugHlth)
- Postgraduate Certificate of Health Promotion (PGCHlthProm)
- Postgraduate Certificate of Infection Control (PGCInfCont)
- Postgraduate Certificate of Public Health (PGCPubHlth)
- Postgraduate Certificate of Travel Medicine (PGCTravelMed)

== See also ==
- Tropical Medicine
- Australian Institute of Tropical Health and Medicine
