= Australian Institute of Tropical Medicine building =

Heritage-listed 1913 medical building in Townsville, Australia

Australian Institute of Tropical Medicine Building
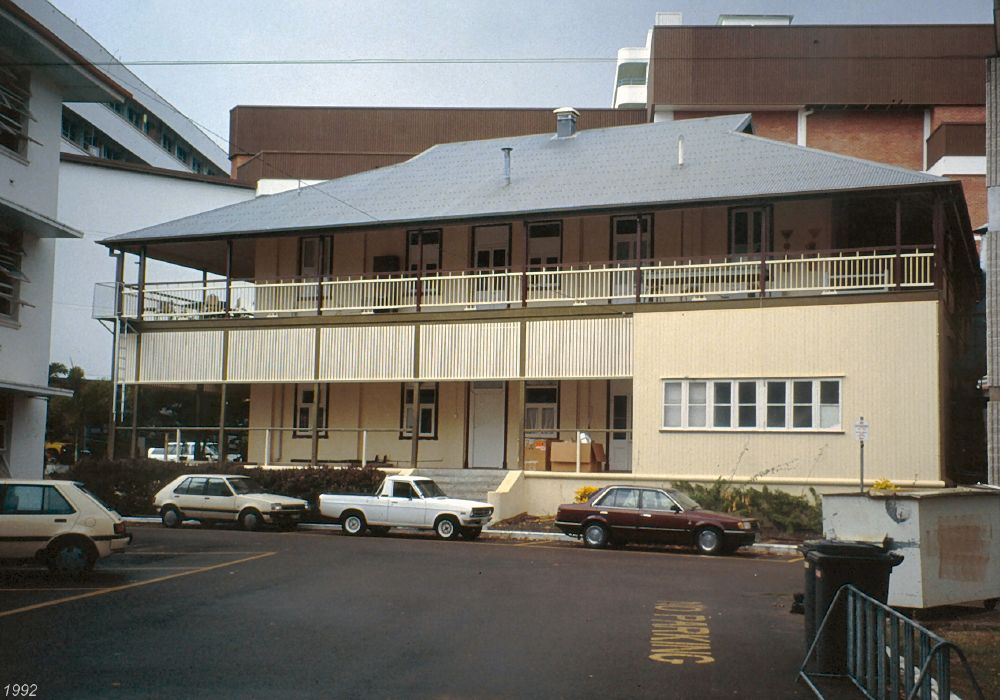
- Australian Institute of Tropical Medicine Building, 1992

- Location within Queensland Location within Australia
- 19.2532°S 146.8126°E
- Location: Clifton Street, Townsville CBD, City of Townsville, Queensland, Australia

History
- Design period: 1900–1914 (early 20th century)
- Built: c. 1912–1913

Site notes
- Architect: A. S. Frew

Queensland Heritage Register
- Official name: James Cook University Department of Public Health and Tropical Medicine Building, Anton Breinl Centre, Australian Institute of Tropical Medicine
- Type: state heritage (built)
- Designated: 21 October 1992
- Reference no.: 600889
- Significant period: 1913 (fabric); 1910s–1930 (historical)

Australian Institute of Tropical Medicine Building is a heritage-listed laboratory at Clifton Street, Townsville CBD, City of Townsville, Queensland, Australia. It was built from c. 1912 to 1913. It is also known as Anton Breinl Centre and James Cook University Department of Public Health and Tropical Medicine Building. It was added to the Queensland Heritage Register on 21 October 1992.

== History ==
The building that houses the Australian Institute of Tropical Medicine was opened on 28 June 1913 by the Queensland Governor Sir William MacGregor. MacGregor was a medical doctor and had a keen interest in tropical medicine as a practitioner in the Seychelles, Mauritius, Fiji, British New Guinea, and the Lagos Colony. He had also visited the institute on previous occasions as governor.

During the early years of the twentieth century there was much debate in Europe and Australia about the need for research into tropical diseases. British debate was motivated by economic and commercial imperatives rather than a concern for the health and welfare of the Empire. According to late nineteenth century thinking and beliefs the tropics were seen as unsuitable for white people because of confused notions about race, place and causes of disease. Certain diseases were believed to be related to place and climate although research was to show that disease was related to social and economic environment as well. These long held European ideas reinforced the belief that there was a need for medical research in order to ensure the economic success of European colonies in tropical regions.

In response to the thinking and concerns of the day research schools were opened in 1899 in London and Liverpool. Following Britain's lead European colonial powers also opened research institutes. At first Australia sent funds to the British institutes to support their research program but, by 1902, Australian medical practitioners were suggesting that a similar research facility be established in Australia.

The establishment of an Australian research centre was seen imperative after malaria parasites were discovered in blood samples in Cairns. Anglican Bishop Frodsham of Townsville led the campaign after a member of his staff died from an unknown disease. He gained local support and in 1907 Gordon Ross, Medical Superintendent of the first Townsville Hospital, recommended to the Department of Health that a pathologist be employed to research and treat patients with a number of tropical diseases. Ross' plan was to discover the causes of disease in order to prevent further outbreaks.

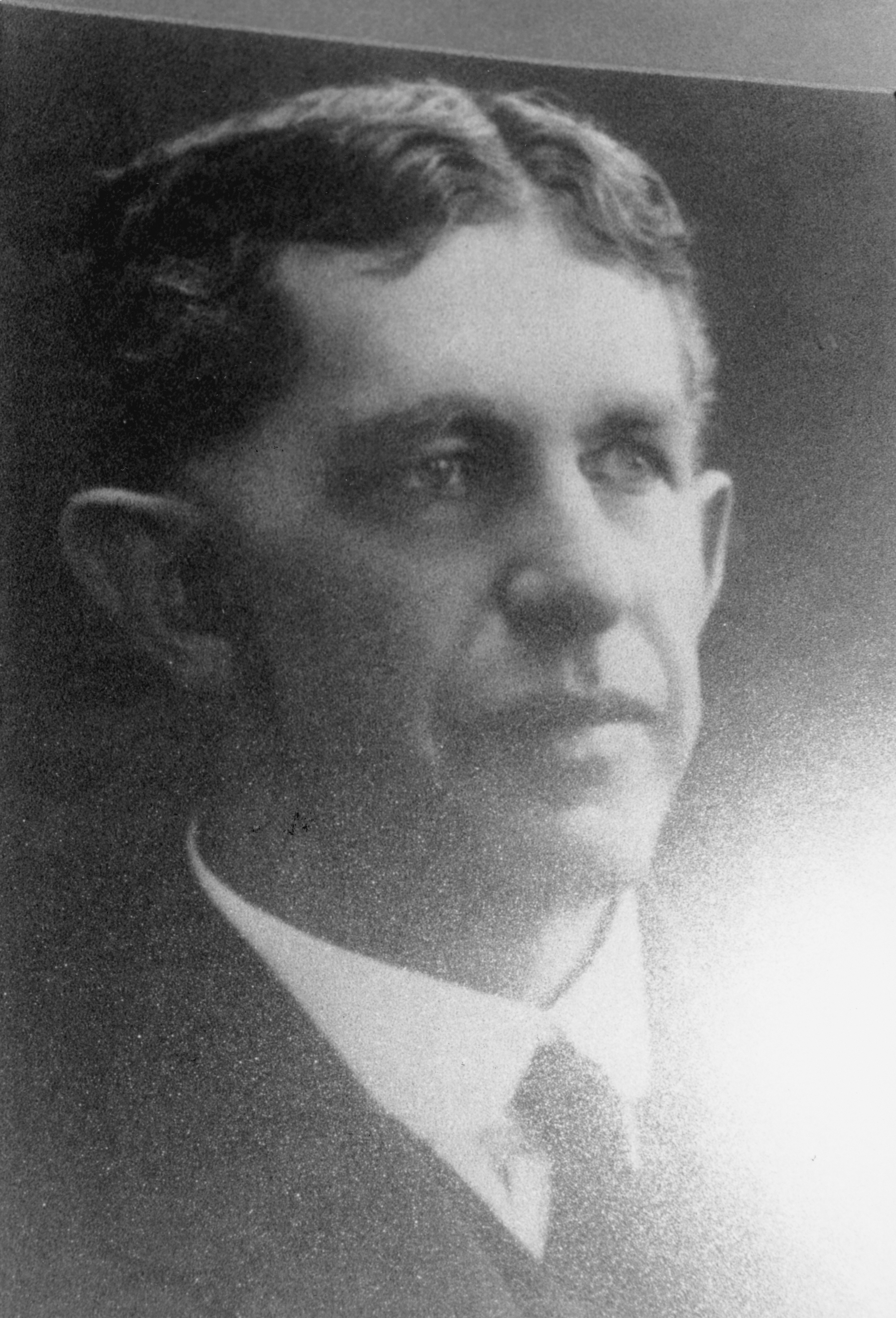
Anton Breinl, 1910

In 1908, responding to the concerns of the medical profession and the community, the Government decided to establish an institute in North Queensland, although some concern was expressed about the distance of the research centre from southern medical schools. While generally the medical profession hoped that the inaugural doctor would be Australian, Dr Anton Breinl, an Austrian, was appointed. Breinl, who arrived in Townsville on 1 January 1910, had been working in the Liverpool School of Tropical Medicine. He was an exceptional medical scientist who had received awards for his contribution to tropical medicine, particularly for his work with Harold Wolferstan Thomas, on a cure for sleeping sickness. The treatment he helped develop, using an organic arsenical "atoxyl", later became a corner stone in the early development of chemotherapy.

Breinl and his laboratory assistant Fielding, were the only members of the new Australian Institute of Tropical Medicine. They were housed in a three-room building which had been a wardsman's quarters in the grounds of Townsville Hospital. Part of the work included field work collecting native fauna for examination in the laboratory, examining data for medical practitioners and collection of data.

By 1911 Breinl was able to show the need for more staff and better premises when the Australian Government gave approval for expanded research into physiological and anthropological problems associated with white people living in the tropics. To facilitate this growth in research a new laboratory and animal house was constructed. The new Institute was opened on 28 June 1913 by Queensland Governor, Sir William MacGregor.

In 1912 the staff was increased to six with the employment of a parasitologist, bacteriologist, biochemist and entomologist. The work of the Institute expanded as the scientists investigated diseases such as malaria, dengue fever, filariasis, typhoid, hookworm, many unidentified fevers, amoebic dysentery, tropical sprue, leprosy, yaws and gangosa. During this period Breinl identified amoebic dysentery during one of his research trip to New Guinea.

The outbreak of World War I and the loss of hospital staff seriously affected the work of the institute. Breinl had to assume the role of Medical Superintendent of the Townsville Hospital and Quarantine Officer while at the same time continuing his research at the institute. During the war years he also treated servicemen sent from New Guinea and from the Middle East who had malaria. In early January 1916 Breinl resigned from the position of Quarantine Officer after becoming embroiled in a bitter public controversy over his Sudeten ancestry. While many in the community supported Dr Breinl and valued his work, others called for his deportation or suggested that he be confined behind "barbed wire".

Despite his resignation from the Quarantine position Breinl continued his research work in the institute. Unfortunately, after the war, the Commonwealth tightened control over finances and the direction of research. Staff were not replaced and by 1920 Breinl was the only medical staff member. Research became impossible because of the lack of funds and staff for field trips. After the institute was absorbed into the newly established Commonwealth Department of Health, Breinl lost control, completely, of the direction of research. He resigned in October 1921 and spent the rest of his life in private practice in Townsville.

A succession of directors followed Breinl's resignation, including Raphael Cilento, appointed in 1923. Cilento remained Director until 1928. In 1930 the Australian Institute of Tropical Medicine was moved to the School of Health at the University of Sydney.

Drawings dated 1957 show the ground floor including tuberculosis laboratories, research laboratories, and an acoustics test room, and the north end of the first floor converted to a bachelor's flat. By 1971, survey drawings called the building the "Commonwealth Health Laboratory, Townsville".

Drawings dated 1984 show planning for the "restoration" of the Tropical Institute was underway. About 1990, the Angelo Gabrielli Research Laboratory was installed as a memorial, with assistance from Townsville Mount Stuart Lions Club. The work was done by the Gabrielli family building firm whose director, Angelo died of a rare tropical disease. A plaque within the corridor says the 'Anton Breinl Centre for Tropical Medicine was officially opened by the Honourable Neal Blewett, Minister for Social Security on 2 July 1992'.

In 2004, the Anton Breinl Centre moved to the main campus of James Cook University to a new building in the Medical School precinct.

== Description ==
The Australian Institute of Tropical Medicine Building is a two-storeyed rectangular building with encircling two-storey timber verandah. It is located within the grounds of the former second Townsville General Hospital, dwarfed behind Blocks "A" and "B", which now have the views of the bay. Facing north-east, it sits on the corner of an internal roadway, on a sloping site being partly cut into the hill, and partly mounted on a plinth. There is a garden of palms and tropical plants to the north-eastern and north-western sides.

The corrugated steel roof is half-hipped with gablets to the front and rear. The timber verandah has a dowelled balustrade to the upper level, and a boarded valance, ripple iron ceiling and concrete floor to the lower level. From the upper level are views to the north over adjoining buildings. The south-east and south-west verandahs are enclosed and clad with chamferboards.

The external walls are rendered masonry, with external engaged piers. There are French doors and casement windows to both levels, opening onto the verandahs. The internal walls are vertical beaded tongue-and-groove boards.

The ground floor has a central corridor with offices to either side accessed through four-panel doors with fanlights. Within the corridor are several display cases containing equipment and photographs of Anton Breinl's trips to Papua in 1912 and 1913. This equipment includes a microscope, rifle, camera and various medical equipment.

The first floor contains the library and laboratory spaces. The library has a pressed metal ceiling and timber bookshelves and cabinets. One cabinet contains a collection of journals owned by Anton Breinl, including Bulletin of Hygiene from 1927, Journal of Hygiene from 1930, and Tropical Diseases Bulletin from 1925. One of the laboratories has been named the Angelo Gabrielli Research Laboratory.

== Heritage listing ==
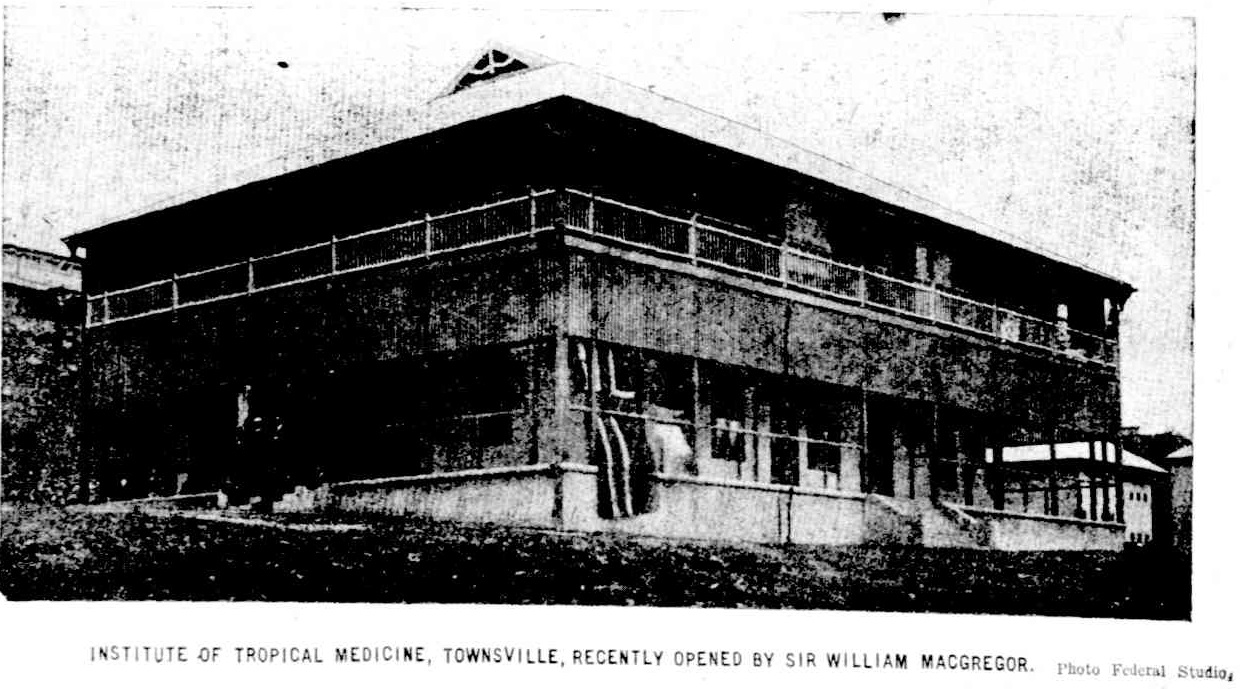
Newly opened building in July 1913

The Australian Institute of Tropical Medicine Building was listed on the Queensland Heritage Register on 21 October 1992 having satisfied the following criteria.

The place is important in demonstrating the evolution or pattern of Queensland's history.

The building constructed as the Australian Institute of Tropical Medicine in 1913, was the first tropical institute in Australia, and important in establishing tropical medical research in North Queensland.

The building was one of a group of international Institutes of Tropical Medicine, and its research was recognised internationally.

The place demonstrates rare, uncommon or endangered aspects of Queensland's cultural heritage.

Although not the first building they used, it was the first building purpose-built for this use. Opened in 1913, it is the oldest surviving building in the Townsville General Hospital complex, and the last of that style surviving.

The place has a strong or special association with a particular community or cultural group for social, cultural or spiritual reasons.

Now part of the James Cook University, it is still in use as a research facility for tropical medicine. The library, which is substantially intact, contains collections of journals which belonged to Anton Breinl.

The place has a special association with the life or work of a particular person, group or organisation of importance in Queensland's history.

The building is significant for its association with the work of Anton Breinl, an exceptional medical scientist who, before his arrival in Australia in 1910, had received awards for his contribution to tropical medical research. During his time as director of the Australian Institute of Tropical Medicine, Breinl instigated research into many tropical diseases, identifying several and, along with other team members, developed treatment for many of the diseases which plagued early settlers in North Queensland.
