= Ken McCracken =

Ken or Kenneth McCracken may refer to:

- Kenneth McCracken (physicist) (born 1938), Australian physicist
- Ken McCracken (rugby league), New Zealand rugby league player
