= FTM =

FTM may refer to:

== Places ==
- Father Michael Troy Catholic Junior High School, in Edmonton, Alberta, Canada
- Fort Matilda railway station, in Inverclyde, Scotland, UK
- Ford Thailand Manufacturing, an automobile manufacturing plant in Rayong, Thailand
- Trento–Malè–Marilleva railway, in Italy
- Fatmawati MRT station, a rapid transit station in Jakarta, Indonesia

== Entertainment ==
- Fair to Midland, an American rock band
- Face the Music (Electric Light Orchestra album), a 1975 album by Electric Light Orchestra

== Companies and organizations ==
- Faculty of Travel Medicine, a medical association serving Australia and New Zealand
- Franco Tosi Meccanica, an Italian engineering firm
- Metalworkers' Federation, a trade union in France

== People ==
- Full-time mother
- Female-to-male, a transgender man

== Others ==
- Family Tree Maker, a genealogy program
- Farm-to-market road
- Fathom, a unit of length
- Field test mode
- First to market
- Follow-the-moon
- Full-time manual focus
