= COALSCAN =

Coal measurement system

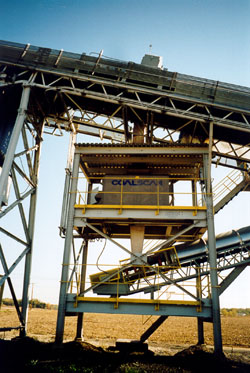
COALSCAN

COALSCAN is a brand of an online coal measurement system developed by Scantech Limited (originally Mineral Control Instrumentation). COALSCAN analysis is a system for the on-line measurement of the mineral, moisture and ash content of coal and coal products. COALSCANs provide real time information for the quality and specification control of coal. The instruments are made in Adelaide and sold to companies worldwide.

== History ==
Originally released to commercial market in 1985 the on-line coal measurement systems have been developed with technology from the CSIRO and University of Queensland in collaboration with Scantech Limited. Since the development of the COALSCAN there have been hundreds installed worldwide.

== Awards ==
The COALSCAN technology has won a number of awards over the past 25 years including:

- 1985: Sir Ian McLennon Achievement for Industry Award, won jointly with the CSIRO to recognise the commercial development of the COALSCAN 4500
- 1992: Dr Howarth, along with three CSIRO scientists, won the prestigious Australia Prize in 1992. This award formally recognised the excellence of the COALSCAN range of analysers.
- 1994: Electronics Association of South Australia Gold Cup for excellence in commercialisation and engineering of the COALSCAN9500 On-Line Elemental Analyser.
- 2002: The COALSCAN range of products recognised by the Powerhouse Museum in Sydney as one of the most significant Australian innovations of the 20th Century.
