= Lee Berger (disambiguation) =

Lee Berger may refer to:

- Lee Berger (biologist) (born 1970), Australian biologist
- Lee Berger (paleoanthropologist) (born 1965), American South African paleoanthropologist and National Geographic Explorer-in-Residence
