= Harold Wolferstan Thomas =

Canadian doctor

Harold Wolferstan Thomas (1875–1931) was a Canadian medical doctor, noted for his research in the field of tropical medicine.

== Early life ==
Harold Wolferstan Thomas was born in 1875 in Montreal, Quebec, the son of the banker Francis Wolferstan Thomas (1834–1900) and his wife Harriet Amelia Thomas (née Goodhue). He studied medicine at McGill University in Montreal until 1897.

== Career ==
Thomas worked in Germany (including at Göttingen and Munich) and at the Montreal General Hospital. From 1903, he worked at the Liverpool School of Tropical Medicine (LSTM) and from 1904 was head of a laboratory in Runcorn. In 1904 he took part in an expedition to study tropical diseases in the Amazon region. Along with Anton Breinl (1880–1944), he discovered in 1905 that the arsenic preparation Atoxyl killed trypanosomes, the causative agent of sleeping sickness. The studies were performed by infecting laboratory animals such as mice, dogs and monkeys with Trypanosoma brucei gambiense and then using of Atoxyl to effect a cure or delay the progression of the disease.

== Later life ==
Thomas died in 1931.

== Works ==
- HW Thomas, A. Breinl: Report on trypanosomes trypasomiasis and sleeping sickness. In: Liverpool School of Med trop., Memoir 16 1905.
- HW Thomas: Some experiments in the treatment of trypanosomiasis. In: British Medical Journal 1905; i: 1140th

== Literature ==
- J. Procopio: Harold Wolferstan Thomas: Canadian scientist in medical service in the Amazon. In: Rev Bras Med 1953 May;. 10 (5): 371-4 PMID 13089191 .
- Steven Miller Rieth: "From Atoxyl to Salvarsan: searching for the magic bullet". In: Chemotherapy. 2005 August; 51 (5): 234–42. PMID 16103665
