= Lee Berger (biologist) =

Australian biologist

- Born: 16 January 1970 (age 56); Epsom, England
- Education: University of Melbourne; James Cook University
- Awards: CSIRO Medal; Fellow, Australian Academy of Science; Frank Fenner Prize; Ian Clunies Ross Memorial Award
- Scientific career
- Fields: Infectious diseases; Veterinary Science; Fungal Pathogenesis
- Thesis: Diseases in Australian Frogs (2001)
- Doctoral advisor: Rick Speare

Lee Berger FAA (born 16 January 1970), is an Australian biologist and veterinarian, who discovered during her PhD that the fungus Batrachochytrium dendrobatidis was responsible for the decline and extinction of hundreds of amphibian species.

== Early life and career ==
Berger was born in Epsom, England in 1970, but moved to Melbourne, Australia with her family just a year later. She earned her undergraduate degree in Veterinary Science from the University of Melbourne. She was awarded her PhD at James Cook University in 2001 under the supervision of Rick Speare. In her PhD she aimed to find the cause of the decline of amphibians in Queensland between the 1970s and 1990s. She identified the cause as being a chytrid fungus, Batrachochytrium dendrobatidis, which causes a disease called chytridiomycosis. She served as the Associate Dean of Research within the College of Public Health, Medical and Veterinary Sciences at James Cook University. She is currently an adjunct professor at James Cook University and the University of Melbourne.

== Discovery of chytridiomycosis ==
In 1990 a mysterious decline in frog species was observed in Australia. Rick Speare theorised that this was caused by an infectious disease and hired Berger to study this. At the time it was thought that infectious diseases could not cause an extinction. However, in 1998 Berger was able to identify a fungus, called Batrachochytrium dendrobatidis, in the skin of the frog. This fungus disrupts the skin, making the frogs unable to absorb electrolytes and water, ultimately causing them to die. Her work on this infectious disease has helped to change practices in conservation around the world.

== Awards ==
- 2000 – CSIRO Medal for Research Achievement
- 2007 – Ian Clunies Ross Memorial Award
- 2011 – Australian Research Council Future Fellow
- 2018 – Frank Fenner Prize for Life Scientist of the Year
- 2020 – Fellow, Australian Academy of Science
