= Richard Moore (engineer) =

American engineer (1923-2012)

Richard K Moore (November 13, 1923 – November 13, 2012) was an American radar engineer, professor emeritus of electrical engineering and computer science at the University of Kansas and founder of the Radar Systems and Remote Sensing Laboratory Lab (RSL). He made significant research contributions to microwave remote sensing of atmosphere, ocean, land, ice, and planetary surfaces; radar systems; and radio wave propagation. He started University of Kansas' Remote Sensing Laboratory.

== Biography ==
Moore graduated with a B.S. in E.E. from the McKelvey School of Engineering at Washington University in St. Louis (WUSTL) in 1943 and from M.I.T. Radar School in 1945. While at WUSTL, he invented the V:F antenna for submarines as his master's thesis. He started working for RCA as a radar engineer in 1944 before joining the Navy and working as an electronics and radar officer during World War II. In 1951, he earned his Ph.D. from Cornell University.

The same year Moore joined Sandia Corporation and became Section Supervisor. In 1955 he transferred to the University of New Mexico as Acting Chairman and associate professor, becoming Chairman of the EE Department and Professor the following year. In 1962 Moore became Black & Veatch Professor of Electrical Engineering at the University of Kansas. The Radar Systems and Remote Sensing Laboratory Lab (RSL) was founded, with Prof. Moore as its director, in 1964. One of its early inventions was the radar radiometer and later the scatterometer. Such an instrument was flown on Skylab as the S-193 RADSCAT. He served as Vice-chairman of the International Commission F from 1990 to 1993 and as Chairman from 1993 to 1996. In 1994 Moore became Distinguished Professor Emeritus. He was thesis advisor to more than 100 graduate students over the course of his career.

Moore died on his 89th birthday, November 13, 2012, in Lawrence, KS.

== Awards ==
- Life Fellow of IEEE, 1962
- Outstanding Technical Achievement Award, IEEE Council on Oceanic Engineering, 1978
- Alumni Achievement Award, School of Engineering and Applied Science, Washington University, 1978
- Distinguished Achievement Award, IEEE Geoscience and Remote Sensing Society, 1982
- Louise E. Byrd Graduate Educator Award, University of Kansas, 1984
- IEEE Centennial Medal, 1984
- Irvin Youngberg Award in the Applied Sciences, University of Kansas, 1989
- Member, National Academy of Engineering, 1989
- Fellow, American Association for the Advancement of Science, 1993
- Remote Sensing Award, Italian Center, 1995
- Australia Prize, for Remote Sensing, 1995

== See also ==
- List of textbooks in electromagnetism
