= Francis Wolferstan Thomas =

Canadian banker (1834–1900)

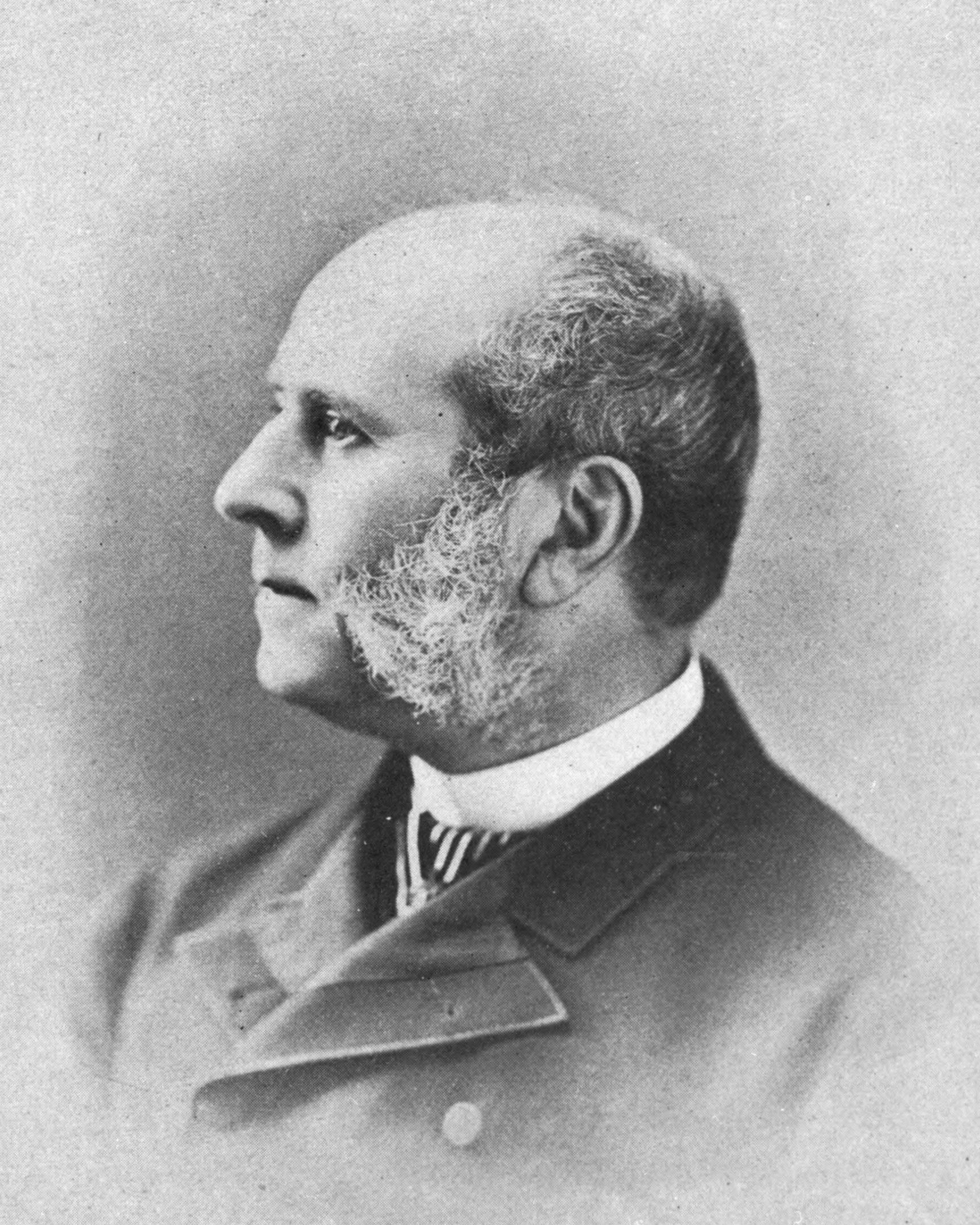
- Born: 9 January 1834; Morwenstow, Cornwall
- Died: 18 May 1900 (aged 66); Montreal, Quebec
- Spouse(s): Harriet Amelia Goodhue (m. 1861) Anne Madeleine VanKoughnet (m. 1888)

Francis Wolferstan Thomas (9 January 1834 – 18 May 1900) was a Canadian banker and a philanthropist in Montreal.

== Early life ==
Born January 9, 1834, at Morwenstow, Cornwall, England, the son of the Rev. Francis Wolferstan Thomas, Rural Dean and Rector of Parkham, North Devon, a family held living through the Reverend's mother's family, the Wolferstans of Berry House, Hartland, Devon, descended from the Wolferstans of Statfold Hall, Staffordshire. Francis' mother was "a lady of the ancient and important family of Shearme, whose seat is Woodlands, Cornwall". The Thomas family were formerly possessed of large estates in Glamorganshire.

Educated at Sherborne School, Dorset, he had a classical education as his parents desired for him to enter the church, like his father and grandfather (a Fellow of Oxford University) before him. But Francis wanted a military career, and at the age of seventeen, with no hope of his parents changing their minds, he instead left home for Rice Lake (Ontario), with the intention to seek his fortune farming.

== Canada ==
In Canada, he met someone who professed to be able to teach him agriculture, but his instructor proved worthless, so he found employment on the Grand Trunk Railway. Idle and adrift in a world of strangers, he was not disheartened and soon secured for himself a position in the Bank of Upper Canada. He was quickly noticed, and offered a job in the Toronto branch of the Bank of Montreal, and his hard work there paid dividends, rising to the position of Manager of the London, Ontario branch office in 1865.

In London he also became a director of the Huron and Eerie Savings and Loan Company, a director of the Canada Life Assurance Company, and Deputy Grand Master (Masonic) of the Masonic Lodge there. In 1870, at the recommendation of Edwin Henry King, ex-president of the Bank of Montreal, he accepted the job of Chief Cashier at Molson's Bank in Montreal.

In Montreal, he served as vice President of the MacKay Institution for Protestant Deaf-Mutes; a member of the managing committee for the Montreal General Hospital, and was a director of the Montreal Museum of Fine Arts and of the Mount Royal Cemetery. It was said of him that "his hand is never closed when she (the Church of England) needs his help, though at the same time he does not refuse his aid to any meritorious object, because its promoters differ from him in creed."

== Family ==
In 1861, he married his first wife, Harriet Amelia Goodhue, third daughter of The Hon. George Jervis Goodhue and his wife Louisa, daughter of Major The Hon. John Matthews, Aide-de-camp to the Governor General of Canada, Charles Lennox, 4th Duke of Richmond. Part of Matthews' Canadian estate was sold to the eccentric Stephen Moore, 3rd Earl Mount Cashell. The first Mrs Thomas (whose sister married a son of Bishop Benjamin Cronyn) helped her husband in his many philanthropic and beneficent efforts. She became an elective governor of the Mackay Institute for the Deaf and Blind, the first directress of the Church Home, treasurer of the Ladies' Protestant Benevolent Society, and president of the Montreal School of Cookery founded by Princess Louise, Duchess of Argyll. They lived in Montreal at 649 Dorchester Street and were the parents of nine children, including Mrs Duncan MacInnes, Harold Wolferstan Thomas, and John Matthews Wolferstan Thomas.

After his first wife died, he married Anne Madeleine VanKoughnet (1863–1945), granddaughter of Colonel Philip VanKoughnet and sister of Lady Casimir Cartwright van Straubenzee. Her father, Matthew, practised law with his brother, Philip Michael Matthew Scott VanKoughnet, the 2nd Chancellor of Upper Canada. Her mother, Elizabeth Hagerman Macaulay (1826–1899), was a daughter of barrister George Macaulay (1796–1828), and a niece of John Simcoe Macaulay, Sir James Buchanan Macaulay, Christopher Alexander Hagerman and John Solomon Cartwright. After Wolferstan Thomas died, his widow remarried Frederick Edmund Meredith. By his second marriage, he was the father of three children, one of whom, Shearme, was the second wife of Lt.-Col. John Lionel Philips D.S.O., J.P., D.L., of Abbey Cwmhir Hall, where his widow died.

Thomas died in 1900.
