= Sherene Loi =

Breast cancer research and translational medicine

Sherene Loi FAA FRACP FAHMS
- Education: University of Melbourne (PhD)
- Scientific career
- Workplaces: Peter MacCallum Cancer Centre

Sherene Loi is an Australian medical oncologist. She is the 2021 winner of the Australian Prime Ministers Prize for Science, in the category of Frank Fenner Prize for Life Scientist of the Year. Loi is Head of Translational Breast Cancer Research, within the Peter Macallum Cancer Centre. Loi's research has advanced understanding into breast cancer, developing and implementing an immune system biomarker. This biomarker will enable improved management for people with advanced cancer. This biomarker is now part of routine pathology reporting across many countries and also is included in the World Health Organization Classification of Tumours (the WHO Blue Book on Breast Tumors).

== Early life and career ==
Loi has an MMBS (Hons), and a PhD, from the University of Melbourne (2007). Loi has, from 2018 to 2020, ranked in the top 1% of global researchers, according to the Web of Science, with more than 240 peer-reviewed publications.

Loi is a medical oncologist, and her career involves translational medicine, which includes translating research findings into treatments, including using genomic medicine, for people with breast cancer, both in Australia and around the world. Her research has helped develop findings supporting that immunotherapy, treatment using the immune system to fight cancer, assists with the survival and improved quality of life of patients with advanced breast cancer.

Loi is the co-chair on the International Breast Cancer Study Group Committee (Switzerland), as well as on the Scientific Advisory Committee Member of Breast Cancer trials group. Her research uses genomic medicine to translate interesting scientific findings to improve outcomes for breast cancer patients. As at 2021, her H-index is 90 and she has over 40,000 citations in Google Scholar.

== Select publications ==
- P Schmid, et al. (2018) Atezolizumab and nab-paclitaxel in advanced triple-negative breast cancer. New England Journal of Medicine: 379 (22), 2108-2121
- C Sotiriou, et al. (2014) Gene expression profiling in breast cancer: understanding the molecular basis of histologic grade to improve prognosis Journal of the National Cancer Institute: 98 (4), 262-272.
- S Loi, N Sirtaine, et al. (2013) Prognostic and predictive value of tumor-infiltrating lymphocytes in a phase III randomized adjuvant breast cancer trial in node-positive breast cancer comparing the additiotion. Journal of Clin Oncol: 31 (7), 860-867.
- S Loi, S Michiels, R Salgado, N Sirtaine, V Jose, D Fumagalli (2014) Tumor infiltrating lymphocytes are prognostic in triple negative breast cancer and predictive for trastuzumab benefit in early breast cancer: results from the FinHER trial. Annals of oncology: 25 (8), 1544-1550.
- S Loi, et al (2025) Neoadjuvant nivolumab and chemotherapy in early estrogen receptor-positive breast cancer: a randomized phase 3 trial Nature Medicine 31, pages 433–441.

== Media ==
Loi's work was described, by the American Association for Cancer Research, as "at the forefront of research on the biological and clinical relevance of tumor infiltrating lymphocytes in breast cancer". The Association states "she is a pioneer in designing and executing clinical trials using immunotherapy agents for the treatment of breast cancer."

When winning the Prime Ministers's award, her work was described as developing a treatment, using immunotherapy, to treat the 'world's first immunotherapy' to treat patients with the most aggressive forms of breast cancer. Her findings may benefit breast cancer patients both in Australia and around the world.

== Prizes and awards ==
Year	Award
2026	Fellow of the Australian Academy of Science
2023	Martin Lackmann Award for Translational Research
2022	Victorian Honour Roll of Women
2021	Frank Fenner Prize for Life Scientist of the year
2020	Outstanding investigator award for Breast Cancer Research, American Association for Cancer Research
2020	European Society of Clinical Oncology Award for Breast Cancer Research.
2021	Jian Zhou Medal recipient, Australian Academy of Health and Medical Sciences
2019	Bruce Cain Award for Clinical Research, New Zealand Society for Oncology
2019	Robert Sutherland Award for Excellence in Translational Research, Breast Cancer Trials Group of Australia/NZ
2018-2020	Clarivate Analytics – Highly Cited Researcher (Top one per cent) in the field of Clinical Medicine
2018-2022	Inaugural Endowed Chair, National Breast Cancer Research Foundation of Australia
2017	Fellow of the Australian Academy of Health and Medical Sciences
2016	’Accelerate Discovery’ Individual Category Award, Peter MacCallum Cancer Centre
2015-2022	Research Fellow, Breast Cancer Research Foundation (New York)
2012	Career Development Award, American Society of Clinical Oncology (ASCO)
