= David Durrheim =

Australian health physician

David Durrheim AM MBChB, MPH&TM, DTM&H, DCH, DrPH, FAFPHM, FACTM, FAAHMS
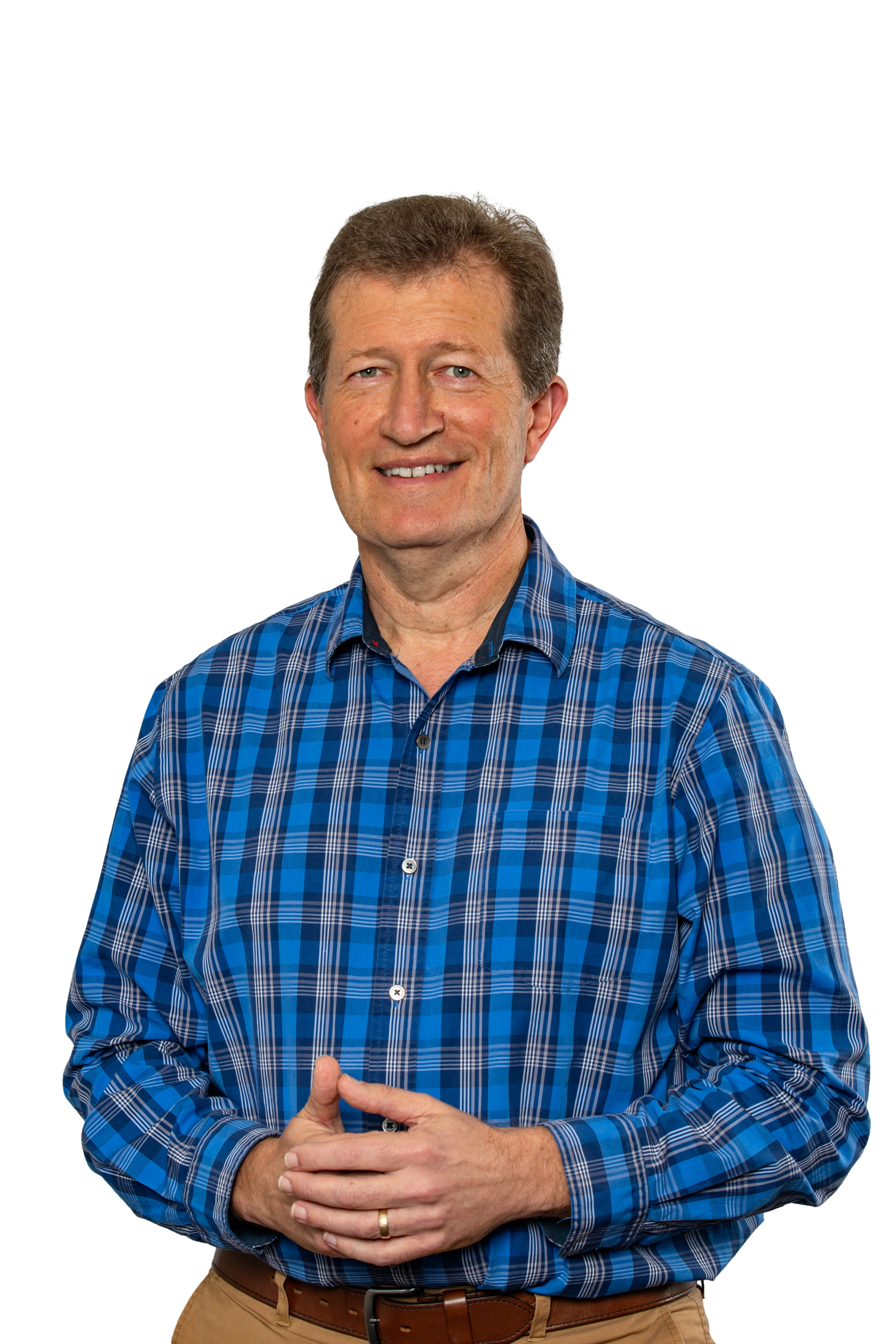
- Employer(s): Director of Health Protection in Hunter New England, New South Wales, Australia, Conjoint Professor of Public Health Medicine at the University of Newcastle and Adjunct Professor of Public Health and Tropical Medicine at James Cook University
- Known for: International Health, Vaccinology
- Title: Freeman of the City of Lake Macquarie

David Noel Durrheim AM is a public health physician who has been director of health protection in Hunter New England, New South Wales, Australia, Conjoint Professor of Public Health Medicine at the University of Newcastle and Adjunct Professor of Public Health and Tropical Medicine at James Cook University, since 2005. He has chaired the Western Pacific Regional Measles and Rubella Elimination Verification Commission since its inception in 2012 and has chaired the National Polio Certification Committee in Australia since 2013. Durrheim was appointed as a Member (AM) of the Order of Australia for "service to public health medicine and international health" in the 2021 Queen's Birthday Honours. He was conferred the honour "Freeman of the City of Lake Macquarie" in 2024, only the 10th person to be so recognised in forty years. This was for an "outstanding contribution to public health and his unwavering dedication during the COVID-19 pandemic".

== Early life ==
Durrheim was born in East London, South Africa, the son of Noel Carl and Iris May (née Sheasby). He graduated from Newcastle Senior High School, Kwa-Zulu Natal, South Africa in 1980 as dux scholar and deputy school captain. Durrheim attended the University of Pretoria and completed a Bachelor of Medicine, Bachelor of Surgery in 1986. He married Jenny (nee Ansell) in 1985. They have two children, Joanne (b. 1991) and Jonty (b.1993). After registrar training in neurology at the Ga-Rankuwa Hospital, South Africa, he relocated to London as a visiting Registrar in Public Health Medicine at St George's Medical School while based at Croydon District Health Authority (1992-1993).

On his return to South Africa, he completed a post-graduate diploma in tropical medicine and hygiene through the University of the Witwatersrand in 1994, a post-graduate diploma in community health through the University of Pretoria in 1995, Masters of public health and tropical medicine through James Cook University in 1998 and Doctor of Public Health through James Cook University in 2002.

== Career ==
With Nelson Mandela's inauguration as the first democratically elected president of South Africa,Durrheim was recruited to the new position of Consultant in Communicable Disease Control for Mpumalanga Province where he served from 1994 to 2001. He established a district-based infectious disease syndromic surveillance and response programme, which proved highly effective in limiting the impact of cholera and invasive meningococcal disease, while meeting global benchmarks in acute flaccid paralysis reporting and reassuring zero-reporting rates. He also introduced confidential inquiries for all malaria, cholera and rabies deaths to identify and address health system weaknesses.

The district-based communicable disease control coordinator model proved highly effective in delivering a supplementary measles vaccination campaign; analysis conducted by Durrheim during a doctoral placement at the University of Oxford demonstrated that well-planned and conducted campaigns could preferentially reach zero-dose children in rural African settings.

Innovative work by African doctoral students supervised by Durrheim demonstrated the value of multi-faceted pharmacovigilance during the community introduction of antimalarial treatment, the role of geographical information systems for efficiently targeting malaria control programmes and exploiting a unique colony of Anopheles arabiensis mosquitoes, naturally breeding in a remote pristine wilderness area, for eliciting behavioural characteristics amenable to measures to reduce personal malaria risk.

From 2002-2004 he was head of the School of Public Health, Tropical Medicine and Rehabilitation Sciences, director of the Anton Breinl Centre for Public Health and Tropical Medicine, and director of the World Health Organization Collaborative Centre for Vector-borne and Neglected Tropical Diseases at James Cook University, Townsville, Australia.

During this period he piloted an adapted version of the southern African syndromic surveillance system in partnership with the Tuvalu Department of Health. In March 2010 this syndromic surveillance system was successfully expanded across all Pacific Island countries and areas to meet the requirements of the International Health Regulations.

From 2009 and until 2012, Durrheim served as member of the Strategic Advisory Group of Experts (SAGE) on immunisation advising the Director-General of the World Health Organization. He also served on multiple SAGE working groups including: vaccination in humanitarian emergencies; meningococcal vaccines; measles and rubella vaccines; Ebola vaccine and vaccination; and COVID-19 vaccines.

Durrheim and two of his doctoral scholars established Australia's longest running One Health Network in 2005. He and his team have continued to innovate with crowd-sourced syndrome surveillance, most notably in tracking influenza-like illness in multiple countries and adverse events following immunisation in Australia.

Community research conducted by his team in the wake of the 2007 New South Wales storms led to the recommendation that all states and territories have formal arrangements with the Australian Broadcasting Corporation (ABC) for providing emergency health information during disasters.

His contribution and reflections on the Australian response to the COVID-19 pandemic form part of the National Library of Australia COVID-19 Oral History Project. He has also contributed to a number of publications to ensure that lessons learnt are not lost for the next inevitable pandemic response.

=== Research output ===
He has co-authored over 500 scientific publications. He has been successful with attaining competitive research grants exceeding $20 million in the past decade. His team at the University of Newcastle received a $7.5 million grant to strengthen field epidemiology capacity, surveillance and outbreak response in Pacific Island countries.

=== Advocacy ===
Durrheim has been an advocate for eradicating measles, and concurrently rubella, using combined measles-rubella containing vaccines, since chairing the Global Technical Consultation to assess the feasibility of measles eradication in Washington, DC in 2010. The consultation concluded that "measles eradication is biologically, technically and operationally feasible with existing tools. Durrheim and the other five Chairpersons of Regional Measles and Rubella Elimination Verification Commissions have called for "a world where no child dies of measles or is disabled due to congenital rubella syndrome."

First Nations health and equity is another area of focus. Aboriginal colleagues and Durrheim have made substantial contributions to closing the gap, and privileging Aboriginal voices and leadership during public health emergency responses.

=== Honours ===
- 2024: Freeman of the City of Lake Macquarie
- 2022: Ambassador of Lake Macquarie
- 2021: Appointed as a Member (AM) of the Order of Australia (General Division) for service to public health medicine and international health
- 2021: The Queen's Birthday COVID-19 honour roll
- 2018: Elected a Fellow of the Australian Academy of Health and Medical Sciences
- 2011: James Cook University Outstanding Alumni Award

== Cardiac arrest ==
Early morning on 20 October 2014, Durrheim suffered a catastrophic cardiac arrest, while cross country running, as a result of a widow-maker. He was clinically dead for some time before a walker discovered his lifeless body and called for help. An emergency physician, Dr Mark Miller. responded and provided chest-only compressions for nearly 20 minutes before Durrheim was retrieved by ambulance to an intensive care unit. "Mark was God's hands on my chest that morning. I am eternally grateful." he said. Imaging of his brain showed multiple areas of ischaemia (strokes) especially, in the brainstem which is critical to survival. Four days later, after a global rallying of prayer, his brain MRI was completely normal and he made a full recovery with no detectable neuropsychological deficit.

== Memoirs ==
Durrheim’s selected memories have been published online in "Memoirs of a Freeman". and his book, We believed you: trust, service and the people who carried us through a pandemic.
