= Elisa Mokany =

Australian researcher

- Education: UNSW
- Occupation: Founder
- Employer: SpeedX
- Known for: Diagnostics innovation

Elisa Mokany is and Australian researcher who is co-founder of SpeedX, winner of the Prime Minister's Prize for Innovation in 2022, and was elected a Fellow of the Australian Academy of Technological Sciences and Engineering in 2026.

== Education and early life ==
Mokany's career inspiration started in high school, where she first learned about genes, genetic inheritance, and developed a desire to learn about genetics.

Mokany received a PhD from UNSW in genetics, titled "The development of multi-component nucleic acid enzymes(MNAzymes)for the detection of analytes", published in 2007.

== Career ==
Mokany was a colleague and PhD student of Alison Todd, who co-founded SpeedX with her. Mokany and Todd were both working at Johnson and Johnson when the Global Financial Crisis occurred. They negotiated the assignment of the technology they created together, and subsequently founded the company SpeedX, which provides diagnostic tests based on mRNA.

Mokany developed diagnostic tests, together with Todd, which detect the antibiotic resistance status and the organism which causes infection, which means doctors can provide a specific treatment which is unique to each patient. The SpeedX diagnosis allowed guided treatment of sexually transmitted infections, which increased the rate of cure from 40% to 93%.

== Selected publications ==
- Elisa Mokany, Simon M. Bone, Paul E. Young, Tram B. Doan, Alison V. Todd; MNAzymes, a Versatile New Class of Nucleic Acid Enzymes That Can Function as Biosensors and Molecular Switches. Journal American Chemical Society 27 January 2010; 132 (3): 1051–1059. https://doi.org/10.1021/ja9076777.
- Elisa Mokany, Yee Lee Tan, Simon M Bone, Caroline J Fuery, Alison V Todd, MNAzyme qPCR with Superior Multiplexing Capacity, Clinical Chemistry, Volume 59, Issue 2, 1 February 2013, Pages 419–426, https://doi.org/10.1373/clinchem.2012.192930.
- Latimer RL, Vodstrcil LA, Plummer EL, et al, Mokany, E. (2022) The clinical indications for testing women for Mycoplasma genitalium. Sexually Transmitted Infections 2022;98:277-285.https://doi.org/10.1136/sextrans-2020-054818

== Awards ==
- 2017 - Outstanding Achievement in Medtech Industry award
- 2020 - Clunies Ross award for Innovation
- 2021 - 100 Innovators, The Australian
- 2022 - Prime Minister's Prize for Innovation.
- 2022 - SBE Impact Awards - "Been There Built That"
- 2026 - Fellow of the Australian Academy of Technological Sciences and Engineering
