= Suzy Urbaniak =

Australian science teacher

Suzy Urbaniak OAM
- Education: Australian National University; Edith Cowan University
- Occupations: Science teacher, former geologist
- Known for: Founder of the Centre of Resources Excellence (CoRE) program
- Awards: 2016 Prime Minister's Prize for Excellence in Science Teaching

Suzy Urbaniak is an Australian science teacher and former geologist known for her teaching methods and the establishment of the Centre of Resources Excellence (CoRE) program. She has been teaching Earth sciences at Kent Street Senior High School in Perth, Western Australia since 2004. Urbaniak received the 2016 Prime Minister's Prize for Excellence in Science Teaching for her skills-based teaching program and contributions to the field of education.

== Early life and education ==
Urbaniak attended the Australian National University from 1984 to 1988, where she studied geology and received several student accolades. She then graduated with a Diploma of Secondary Education from Edith Cowan University in 2003.

== Career ==
Following her graduation, Urbaniak worked as a geologist for Newcrest. In 2004, she transitioned to a career in education, becoming a science teacher at Kent Street Senior High School in Perth. Her teaching approach focuses on developing young scientists by emphasizing hands-on learning, field trips, and real-world scientific practices.

In addition to her teaching responsibilities, Urbaniak has launched various initiatives to promote earth sciences and STEM principles in her curriculum. She introduced the bi-annual Kent Street Women in Mining Day, which provides female students with networking opportunities and hands-on activities related to the mining industry. Urbaniak also organized the Curtin University Mining Challenge at Kent Street SHS, which aims to introduce primary school students to careers in mining.

Urbaniak's efforts to establish the Centre of Resources Excellence (CoRE) program have gained recognition from the Australian Geoscience Council, which applauded her vision in creating a foundation for students to develop the necessary skills and knowledge for careers in science and engineering.

== Awards and recognition ==
Urbaniak has received numerous awards and recognition for her contributions to science education, most notably the 2016 Prime Minister's Prize for Excellence in Science Teaching. She was also nominated for Western Australia's Australian of the Year award. In 2018, she was included in the WA Women's Hall of Fame. Her story was featured in Cristy Burne's Aussie STEM Stars book series, titled "Suzy Urbaniak: Volcano Hunter and STEAM Warrior", published by the Wild Dingo Press in February 2023. 2024 awarded Medal of the Order of Australia (OAM) - for service to secondary education.

== Personal life ==
Urbaniak is a mother of three children.
