= Australian Institute of Tropical Health and Medicine =

- Established: 2008
- Director: Professor Alex Loukas
- Faculty: James Cook University
- Budget: A$17 million (2015)
- Formerly called: Australian Institute of Tropical Medicine
- Location: Townsville and Cairns, Queensland, Australia
- Coordinates: 19°19′39″S 146°45′31″E
- Interactive map of Australian Institute of Tropical Health and Medicine
- Website: www.aithm.jcu.edu.au

The Australian Institute of Tropical Health and Medicine (AITHM) is an Australian tropical health and medical research institute based at James Cook University (JCU) in Townsville and Cairns, Queensland. Formerly known as the Australian Institute of Tropical Medicine, AITHM was established at JCU in 2008.

AITHM's focus is on the health problems of most importance to tropical Australia and the tropics worldwide, particularly within Australia’s geographical region. This focus is reflective of JCU's strategic commitment to "Creating a brighter future for life in the tropics worldwide through graduates and discoveries that make a difference". The current Director of AITHM is Professor Alex Loukas.

== Overview ==
AITHM aims to contribute to better health for people in the tropics by developing new prevention, diagnosis and treatment options for diseases that are of importance in the tropical world. This is achieved through biomedical, molecular, genomic, epidemiological, entomological and health systems research that is undertaken within an integrated public health framework. Through its research and innovation, and in partnership with key organisations, AITHM aims to bridge the gap between cutting edge research, disease control methodology and scientific expertise; and health service, workforce and policy delivery relevant to tropical populations.

In early 2012, AITHM received a commitment of $42.12 million from the Queensland Government to build essential infrastructure and bolster key research projects. This funding has significantly enhanced AITHM’s capacity to underpin Australia’s health security and biosecurity strategies with effective research. The funding is also intended to enhance research to improve health in rural, remote and tropical Australia, in Aboriginal and Torres Strait Islander populations, and across the tropics regionally and globally. AITHM now has research facilities on both the Townsville and Cairns campuses of James Cook University and on Thursday Island, the main commercial and administrative hub of the Torres Strait.

== History ==
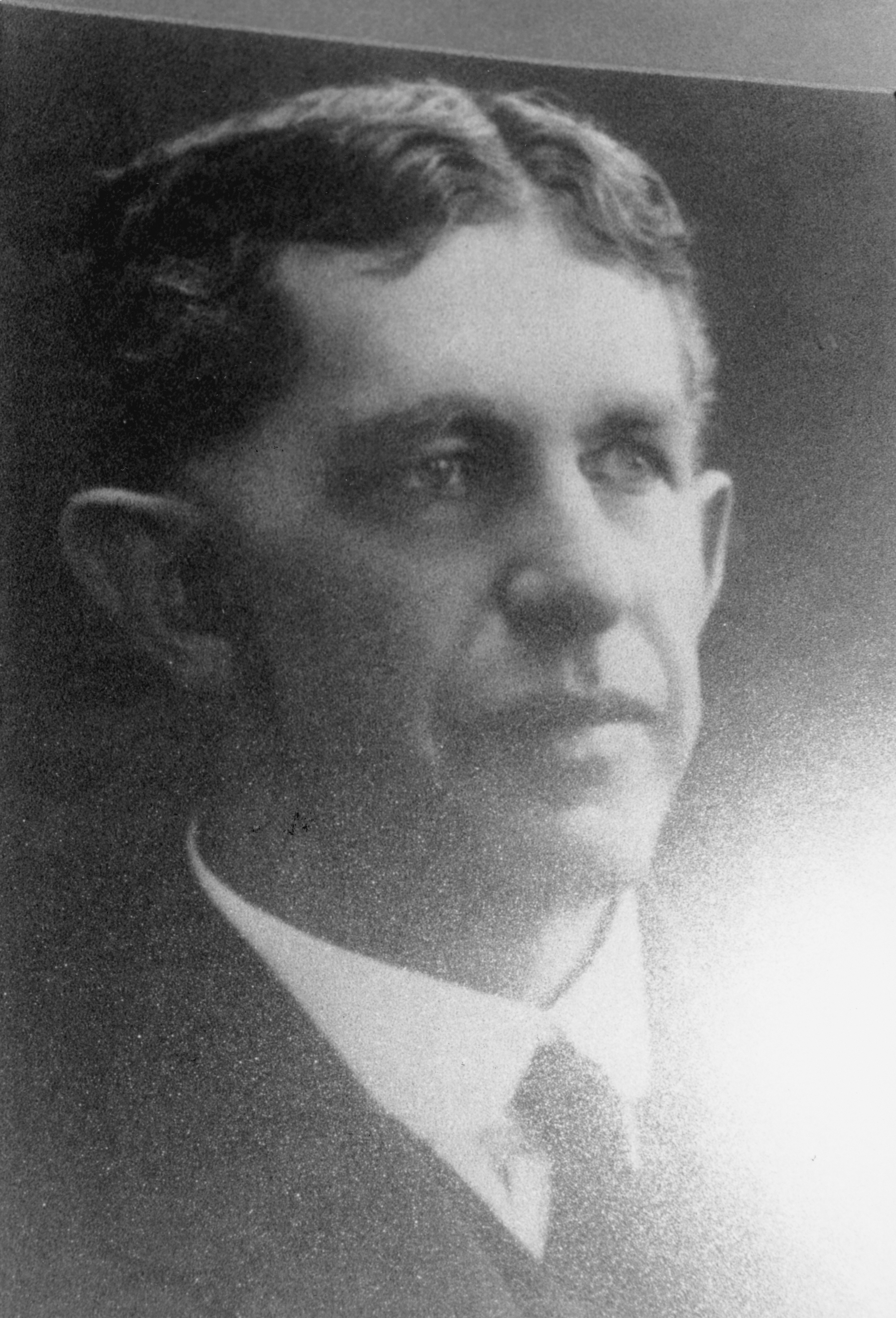
Anton Breinl, 1910

JCU has a long history in tropical health research, with an established focus on infectious diseases and the health of tropical populations through the Anton Breinl Centre. AITHM’s research builds on these epidemiological and public health foundations.

AITHM’s predecessor, The Australian Institute for Tropical Medicine, was established in Townsville in 1913 and was Australia's first medical research institute. Before it was subsumed into the then Commonwealth Department of Health in 1921, the Institute made a significant contribution to understandings about how Europeans could live in and adapt to tropical Australia. The Institute's first director was Dr Anton Breinl, who had previously worked as a medical scientist at the Liverpool School of Tropical Medicine.

== Research areas ==
AITHM’s key research areas include:

=== Tropical infectious disease ===
- Infectious diseases and public health research: Surveillance, diagnostics and epidemiology (including multi-drug resistant tuberculosis, and novel, emerging and re-emerging infectious diseases). Led by Professor Robyn McDermott, Professor Patricia Graves, Associate Professor Jeffrey Warner, and Professor John McBride.
- Infectious diseases and immunopathogenesis (including Q Fever, melioidosis, streptococcal infections, mycobacterial infections, helminth infections, toxoplasmosis, intersections between communicable and non-communicable diseases). Led by Professor Natkunam Ketheesan, Professor Alex Loukas, Dr Brenda Govan, and Professor Nicholas Smith.
- Vector-borne diseases and vector management (including dengue fever, encephalitis, lymphatic filariasis and other neglected tropical diseases, malaria). Led by Professor Scott Ritchie, Professor Tom Burkot, and Associate Professor Patrick Schaeffer.

The Anton Breinl Centre and the Centre for Biosecurity and Tropical Infectious Diseases enhance the organisational capacity of these research areas.

=== Chronic disorders with high prevalence in the tropics ===
- Peripheral Vascular Disease (a Centre of Research Excellence funded by the National Health and Medical Research Council). Led by Professor Jonathan Golledge.
- Chronic disease epidemiology and health transition, particularly involving diabetes via the Centre for Chronic Disease Prevention and Care (a collaboration between the University of South Australia, James Cook University, the Aboriginal Health Council of South Australia, Queensland Aboriginal and Islander Health Council and the Royal Flying Doctor Service with funding provided by the Australian Primary Health Care Research Institute CRE program). Led by Professor Robyn McDermott.
- Skin cancer research group. Led by Dr Simone Harrison.
- Mental health. Led by Professor Kim Usher, Associate Professor Zoltan Sarnyai, and Dr Craig Bennett.
- Accident and emergency response and prevention. Led by Associate Professor Richard Franklin, Professor Geoffrey Dobson, and Associate Professor Jamie Seymour.
- Substance abuse research group. Led by Associate Professor Alan Clough.

=== Development of diagnostics and therapeutics ===
- Molecular development of new therapies from bioactive compounds derived from tropical organisms, through the Centre for Biodiscovery and Molecular Development of Therapeutics. Led by Professor Alex Loukas, Professor Nicholas Smith, and Associate Professor Jamie Seymour
- Diagnostics for influenza, melioidosis, multiple sclerosis, type 1 (childhood) diabetes, lupus and gastritis; and molecular characterisation of allergenic proteins and their effect on the immune system, leading to the development of advanced strategies of detecting and treating allergies (through the Comparative Genomics Centre). Led by Professor Alan Baxter, Associate Professor Patrick Schaeffer, and Associate Professor Andreas Lopata.

=== Genetic diseases ===
- Comparative genomics, through the Comparative Genomics Centre (including lupus, multiple sclerosis, diabetes, allergies and birth defects). Led by Professor Alan Baxter.

=== Health services in tropical, regional, rural and remote communities ===
- Health systems research (focussed on workforce development and health service delivery particularly in rural, remote, and indigenous populations in tropical Australia and the Pacific). Led by Professor Sabina Knight, Associate Professor Sarah Larkins, Associate Professor Jacinta Elston, and Associate Professor Jane Mills
- Translation of research evidence into public health and healthcare practice. Led by Professor Robyn McDermott and Professor John McBride
- Occupational Health & Safety (OHS) research (focussed on the mining and agricultural workforce in tropical and regional Australia). Led by Associate Professor Gunther Paul

== Location ==
AITHM is headquartered at the JCU campus in Townsville, with research facilities in Townsville, Cairns, and the Torres Strait.

== Key positions ==
The Director of AITHM is Professor Alex Loukas.

== See also ==
- Health in Australia
