= Australia Prize =

Former science award

The Australia Prize was Australia's pre-eminent prize for scientific research from 1990 until 2000, when it was replaced by the Prime Minister's Prizes for Science. The award was international, 10 of the 28 recipients were not Australians.

== Recipients ==
- 1999 - Energy science and technology theme - Martin A. Green and Stuart R. Wenham
- 1998 - Molecular science theme - Elizabeth Blackburn, Suzanne Cory, Alec Jeffreys and Grant Sutherland
- 1997 - Telecommunications theme- Allan Snyder, Rodney Tucker and Gottfried Ungerboeck
- 1996 - Pharmaceutical design theme - Paul Janssen, Graeme Laver, Peter Colman and Mark von Itzstein
- 1995 - Remote sensing theme - Kenneth G. McCracken, Andrew Green, Jonathon Huntington, Richard Moore
- 1994 - Sustainable land management theme - Gene Likens
- 1993 - Sensory perception theme - Horace Barlow, Peter Bishop and Vernon Mountcastle
- 1992 - Mining or processing of mineral resources theme - John Watt, Brian Sowerby, Nicholas Cutmore and Jim Howarth
- 1991 - No awards presented
- 1990 - Agriculture or the environment theme - Allen Kerr, Eugene Nester and Jeff Schell
