= Tropical medicine =

Interdisciplinary branch of medicine

Tropical medicine physician
Occupation
- Names: Physician
- Occupation type: Specialty
- Activity sectors: Medicine

Description
- Education required: Doctor of Medicine (M.D.); Doctor of Osteopathic medicine (D.O.); Bachelor of Medicine, Bachelor of Surgery (M.B.B.S.)
- Fields of employment: Hospitals, clinics

Tropical medicine is an interdisciplinary branch of medicine that deals with health issues that occur uniquely, are more widespread, or are more difficult to control in tropical and subtropical regions.

Physicians in this field diagnose and treat a variety of diseases and ailments. Most infections they deal with are endemic to the tropics. A few of the most well-known include malaria, HIV/AIDS, and tuberculosis. They must be knowledgeable in the 21 lesser known neglected tropical diseases, which include Chagas disease, rabies, dengue, lymphatic filariasis, onchocerciasis, schistosomiasis, and scabies. Poor living conditions in developing regions of tropical countries have led to a rising number of non-communicable diseases as well as the prevalence of neglected tropical diseases. These diseases include cancer and cardiovascular disease, which, in the past, have been more of a worry in developed countries. Physicians trained in tropical medicine must also be prepared to diagnose and treat these diseases.

Training for physicians wishing to specialize in tropical medicine varies widely across different countries. They must study epidemiology, virology, parasitology, and statistics, as well as the training required of an ordinary physician. Research on tropical diseases and their treatment comes from both field research and research centers, including those of the military.

== Founder ==
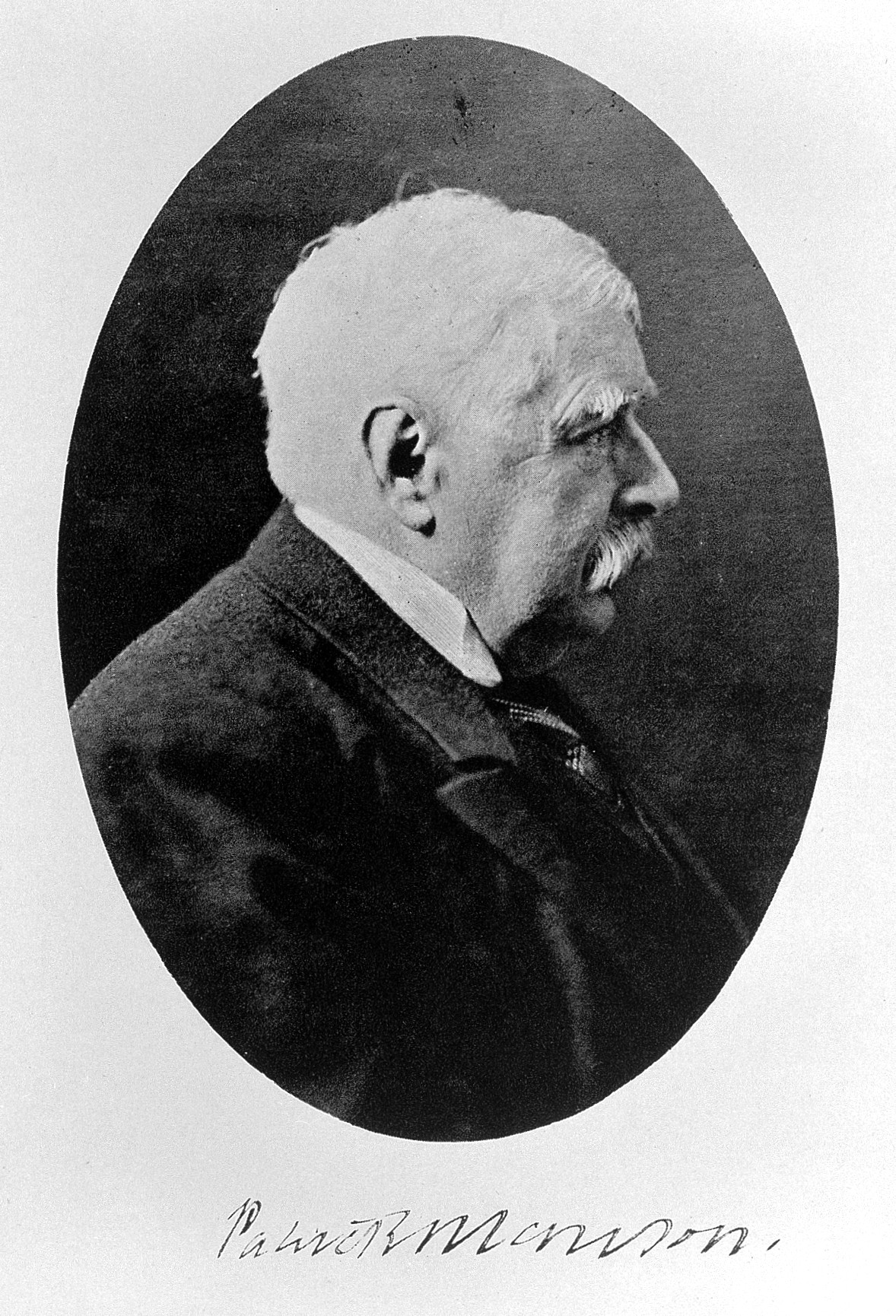
Sir Patrick Manson, considered the father of tropical medicine.

Sir Patrick Manson is recognized as the father of tropical medicine. He founded the London School of Hygiene & Tropical Medicine in 1899. He is credited with discovering the vector by which elephantiasis was being passed to humans. He learned it was a microscopic nematode worm called Filaria sanguinis hominis. He continued to study this worm and its life cycle and determined the worms underwent metamorphosis within female Culex fatigans mosquitoes. Thus he discovered mosquitoes as a vector for elephantiasis. After this discovery, he collaborated with Ronald Ross to examine the transmission of malaria via the mosquito vector. His work on vectors as modes of transmission was critical in the founding of tropical medicine and the current understanding of many tropical diseases.

== Training ==
Training in tropical medicine is quite different between countries. Most physicians are trained at institutes of tropical medicine or incorporated into the training of infectious diseases.

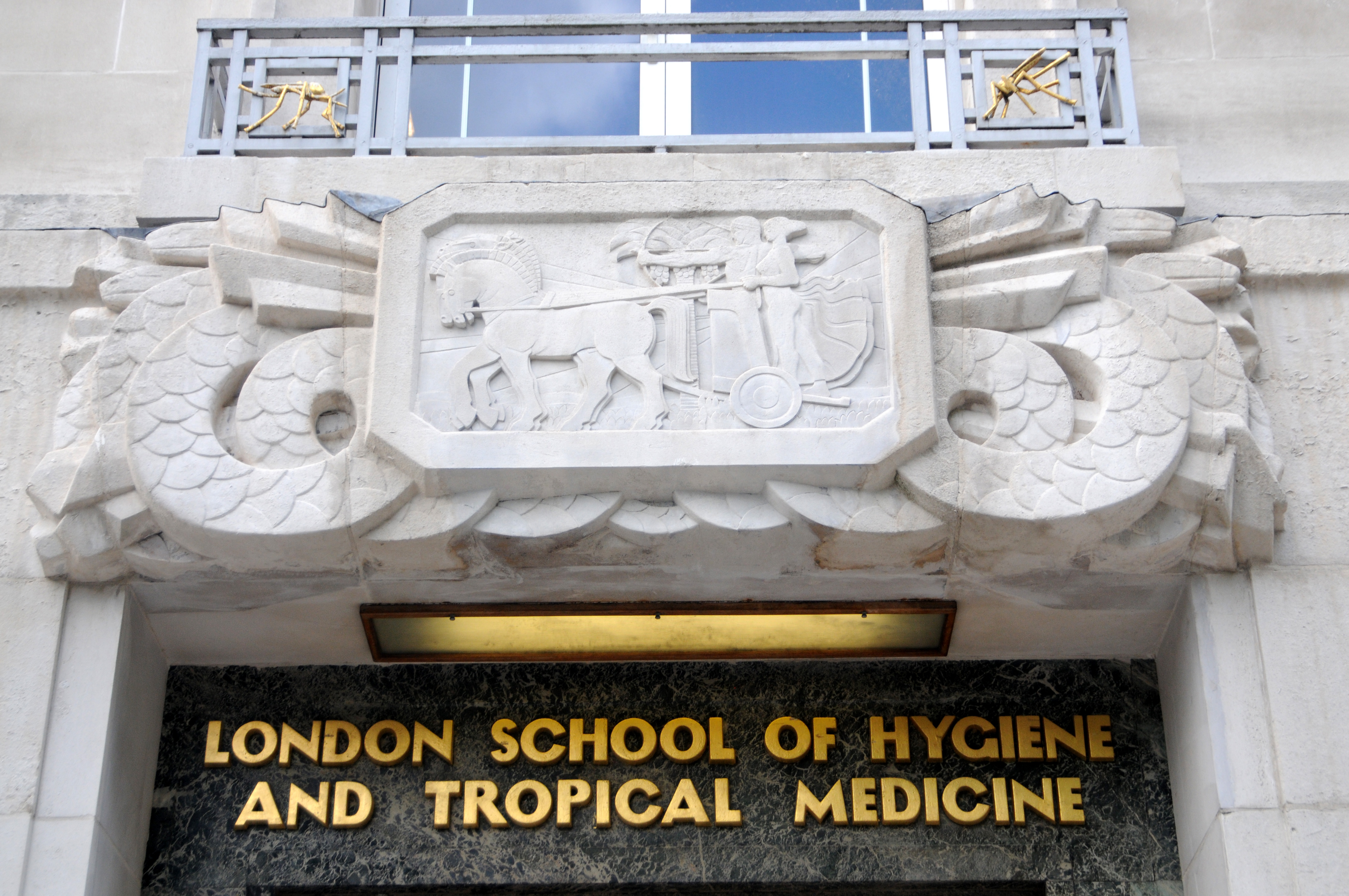
The London School of Hygiene and Tropical Medicine, founded by Sir Patrick Manson

In the UK, if a physician wants to specialize in tropical medicine, they must first train in general internal medicine and get accepted into the Royal College of Physicians. They must simultaneously study the specialty of infectious diseases while completing a full-time course load to receive their Diploma in Tropical Medicine and Hygiene. Their studies are carried out at either the London School of Hygiene & Tropical Medicine or the Liverpool School of Tropical Medicine. Additionally, they must spend two years at one of the UK centers approved for tropical medicine (located in London, Liverpool, or Birmingham). Physicians in the UK who wish to be certified in tropical medicine must spend at least a year abroad in an area lacking resources. Only then can they become certified in tropical medicine.

The training of United States tropical doctors is similar, though it is not a board-recognized specialty in America. Physicians must first complete medical school and a program focusing on infectious diseases. Once completed, physicians can take the certification exam from the American Society of Tropical Medicine and Hygiene to receive the Certificate of Knowledge in Clinical Tropical Medicine and Travelers' Health.

== Challenges ==
=== HIV ===
In developing countries alone, 22 million people are living with HIV. Most infections are still in Africa, but Europe, Asia, Latin America, and the Caribbean are now seeing large numbers of infections as well. 95% of expected new infections will occur in the low-income countries in the tropics. The expected number of new infections is 3-4 million per year. Risk factors such as needle use and unprotected sex are much more prevalent in tropical and underdeveloped areas. Once HIV is transmitted to a tropical area, it is spread throughout the sexually active population. Though how fast and how far it spreads varies, some African countries have an HIV prevalence of 10%. More alarming still, in urban areas, prevalence among pregnant women can get as high as 30%. Healthcare professionals themselves are at great risk of exposure to HIV. An HIV prevalence of 10% means any given workforce will also have a 10% prevalence, and this does not exclude the healthcare team. Tuberculosis is thought to cause a more rapid disease progression. Tuberculosis is prevalent in tropical and underdeveloped countries, only making HIV more devastating. Without the expensive and high-tech medical equipment of developed, western countries, physicians in the tropics are left with few options. If they are able to catch an HIV-related bacterial or mycobacterial disease, they can diagnose and manage the disease with basic drugs and standard treatment protocol. Many underdeveloped countries do not have a care strategy, and of those that do, they aren't as effective as they need to be to stop the spread of HIV.

=== Malaria ===
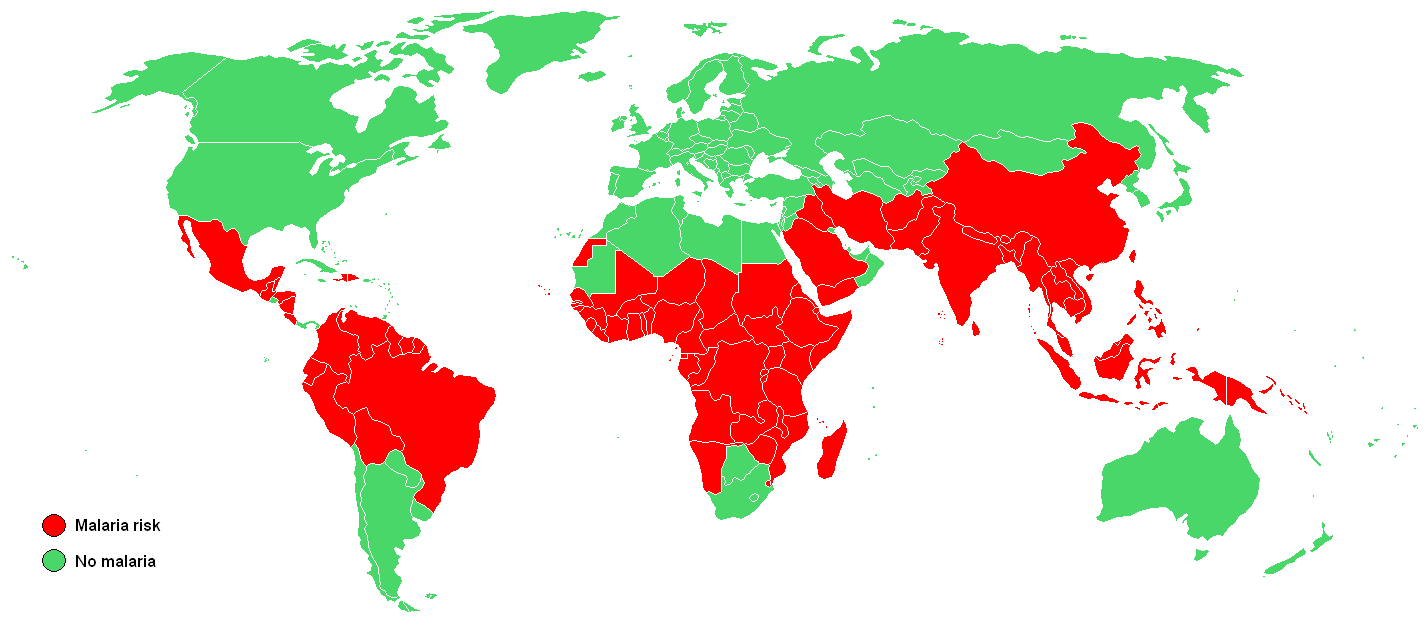
A map detailing areas where malaria is endemic.

Malaria is a parasitic disease transmitted by an Anopheles mosquito to a human host. The parasite that causes malaria belongs to the genus Plasmodium. Once infected, malaria can take a wide variety of forms and symptoms. The disease is placed into the uncomplicated category or the severe category. If quickly diagnosed and treated, malaria can be cured. However, some of the more serious symptoms, such as acute kidney failure, severe anemia, and acute respiratory distress syndrome can be fatal if not dealt with swiftly and properly. Certain types of Plasmodium can leave dormant parasites in the liver that can reawaken months or years later, causing additional relapses of the disease. In the World Malaria Report of 2016, the World Health Organization reported a malaria infection rate of 212 million, 90% of which occurred in the African region. However, malaria infection rates had fallen 21% since 2010 at the time of the report. The WHO also reported an estimated mortality rate of 429,000 deaths in the year 2015. The malaria mortality rate had fallen 29% globally since 2010. Children under 5 contract the malaria disease more easily than others, and in the year 2015, an estimated 303,000 children under the age of 5 were killed by malaria. Since the year 2010, however, the mortality rate of children under 5 fell by an estimated 35%.

=== Tuberculosis ===
Tuberculosis (TB) is an infectious bacterial disease that can affect any part of the body, though it primarily affects the lungs. It is a disease that affects the poor and weak, and is far more common in developing countries. TB can either be in its latent or active form. TB can be latent for years, sometimes over a decade. Though TB research receives 1/6th of the funding of HIV research, the disease has killed more people in the last 200 years than any other infectious disease. According to the Liverpool School of Tropical Medicine, an estimated 9 million people were infected with TB in the year 2013 alone. That same year, 1.5 million people died from TB. Of those 1.5 million, 360,000 were HIV positive. Tuberculosis is extremely expensive to treat, and treatments are now becoming ineffective due to drug-resistant TB strains. In the year 2016, 1.3 million people died from TB. An additional 374,000 people died who were co-infected with both TB and HIV. Research has shown that if the subject is infected with HIV, the risk of latent TB becoming active TB is between 12 and 20 times higher.

=== Non-communicable diseases ===
Non-communicable diseases are a series of chronic illnesses such as cardiovascular disease, cancer, injuries, and respiratory diseases, among others. Historically these diseases have plagued developed countries far more than developing countries. In the Global Burden of Disease Study of 2001, it was discovered that 20% of deaths in sub-Saharan Africa were caused by non-communicable diseases. In 2005, the World Health Organization performed a study that showed 80% of chronic disease deaths occurred in low to middle-income countries. Non-communicable disease prevalence has been rising in underdeveloped countries for a variety of reasons. Lack of education and preventive medicine in underdeveloped countries, along with malnutrition or poor diet, leads to many risk factors for non-communicable diseases.

=== Neglected tropical diseases ===
Neglected tropical diseases (NTDs) have been identified by the World Health Organization (WHO) as 18 tropical diseases, affecting over a billion people worldwide, especially in developing countries. These diseases are heterogeneous, meaning originating outside the organism affected by the disease. NTDs are caused by parasites, viruses, and bacteria. NTDs are neglected because they are not normally fatal on their own but are disabling. Persons with these diseases become more susceptible to other NTDs and fatal diseases such as HIV or malaria.

Neglected tropical diseases' effect can be measured in disability-adjusted life year (DALY). Each DALY corresponds to one lost year of healthy life, whether by death or disability. In the year 2010, it was estimated that 26.6 million DALYs were lost. In addition, it is estimated that NTDs cause a loss of 15–30% of productivity in countries where NTDs are endemic. According to the CDC, 100% of countries categorized as 'low income' were affected by 5 different NTDs at once.

== Interdisciplinary approach ==
Tropical medicine requires an interdisciplinary approach, as the infections and diseases tropical medicine faces are both broad and unique. Tropical medicine requires research and assistance from the fields of epidemiology, microbiology, virology, parasitology, and logistics. Physicians of tropical medicine must have effective communication skills, as many of the patients they interact with do not speak English comfortably. They must be proficient in their knowledge of clinical and diagnostic skills, as they are often without high-tech diagnostic tools when in the field. For example, in an attempt to manage the Chagas disease being brought into the almost Chagas-free Brazilian city São Paulo by Bolivian immigrants, an interdisciplinary team was set up. The Bolivian immigrant population in São Paulo had a prevalence of Chagas disease of 4.4%, while Chagas disease transmission in São Paulo has been under control since the 1970s. This influx of cases of Chagas disease led to the formation of an interdisciplinary team. This team tested the feasibility of managing Chagas disease and transmission at the primary healthcare level. The interdisciplinary team consisted of community health agents and clerical healthcare workers to recruit Chagas-infected persons for the study, physicians, nurses, lab workers, and community agents. A pediatrician and cardiologist were also on call. Each was trained in pathology, parasitology, ecoepidemiology, and how to prevent, diagnose, and control Chagas disease. Training from experts in these respective fields was required. They examined reasons for lack of adherence to treatment and used this knowledge to improve the effectiveness of their interventions. This interdisciplinary approach has been used to train many teams across Brazil in the management of Chagas disease.

Tropical medicine also consists of a preventive approach, especially in an educational aspect. For example, from 2009 to 2011, the London School of Hygiene & Tropical Medicine did an interventional study on a cohort of female sex workers (FSW) in Ouagadougou, Burkina Faso, a country in Western Africa. 321 HIV-unaffected FSWs were provided with peer-led HIV/STI education, HIV/STI testing and care, psychological support, general healthcare, and services for reproductive health. The same cohort would continue to follow up, quarterly, for 21 months. At each follow-up, they were tested for HIV and were able to utilize the preventive interventions if needed. Using models based on the same study population, had there been no interventions, the expected prevalence of HIV infections was 1.23 infection per 100 person years. In the actual cohort with access to interventions, no HIV infections were observed in the collective 409 person-years of follow-up.

== Tropical research in the military ==
Throughout history, American military forces have been affected by many tropical diseases. In World War II alone, it was estimated that almost one million soldiers had been infected by a tropical disease while serving. Most affected soldiers served in the Pacific, especially in the Philippines and New Guinea. Malaria was especially widespread in the Pacific, though soldiers in Southern Europe and Northern Africa also contracted tropical diseases. Many diseases now known as neglected tropical diseases affected American soldiers as well. These included helminthiasis, schistosomiasis, dengue, and lymphatic filariasis. Lymphatic filariasis was such a problem that it caused a $100 million evacuation of U.S. troops out of New Guinea and the Tonga Islands.

In both the Korean and Vietnam Wars, the United States army continued to be affected by tropical diseases. The most prevalent diseases to affect their military were malaria and dengue. Hepatitis A, scrub typhus, and hookworm infections were among the other tropical infections picked up by troops in these conflicts.

To combat the significant effects tropical diseases were having on their forces, the United States Military worked hard to develop drugs, vaccines, and other methods of disease control. Research done at the Walter Reed Army Institute of Research (WRAIR), the Naval Medical Research Center (NMRC), and various affiliated research centers have greatly improved the military's preparedness against tropical disease. In 1967, Captain Robert Phillips earned the Lasker Award for developing a type of IV therapy that reduced cholera's fatality rate from 60% to less than 1%. Other interventions licensed by the US Army include vaccines for hepatitis A and Japanese encephalitis. They have also developed the drugs mefloquine and malarone, both used in the treatment of malaria.

Looking forward, the United States military currently has clinical trials testing for vaccines of malaria, adenovirus infection, dengue, and HIV/AIDS underway. However, with massive budget cuts to their military, these research centers are getting less and less funding and have lost many contractors already.

== Bibliography ==
- Bruchhausen, Walter (2020), Global health in the colonial era: The expansion of European medicine, EGO – European History Online, Mainz: Institute of European History, retrieved: March 17, 2021 (pdf).
- Jonathan Kaplan. The dressing station, a surgeon's odyssey. Picador, London, 2001.
- Deborah J. Neill. Networks in Tropical Medicine: Internationalism, Colonialism, and the Rise of a Medical Specialty, 1890–1930 (Stanford University Press; 2012) 320 pages; shows how the emerging field was shaped by physicians' and scientists' collaborating during a major epidemic of sleeping sickness in sub-Saharan Africa.
- Anne Spoerry. Mama Daktari. The house of books, Vianen, 2000.
- John Farley. "Bilharzia: A History of Tropical Medicine." Cambridge University Press, 1991.

== Organizations ==
- American Society of Tropical Medicine and Hygiene – Arlington, Virginia, USA
- The Australasian College of Tropical Medicine
- Australian Institute of Tropical Health and Medicine, Townsville and Cairns, Queensland, Australia
- Anton Breinl Centre for Public Health and Tropical Medicine
- Bernhard Nocht Institute for Tropical Medicine – Hamburg, Germany
- Faculty of Tropical Medicine, Mahidol University – Bangkok, Thailand
- Institute of Tropical Medicine, Nagasaki University – Nagasaki, Japan
- Tulane University School of Public Health and Tropical Medicine – New Orleans, Louisiana, USA
- Liverpool School of Tropical Medicine – Liverpool, United Kingdom
- London School of Hygiene & Tropical Medicine – London, United Kingdom
- Institute of Tropical Medicine – Antwerp, Belgium
- Research Institute for Tropical Medicine – Muntinlupa, Philippines
- Royal Society of Tropical Medicine and Hygiene – London, United Kingdom
- Walter Reed Tropical Medicine Course – Silver Spring, Maryland, USA
- Société Francophone de Médecine Tropicale et Santé Internationale – France

== See also ==
- Disaster medicine
- Travel medicine
- Tropical nursing
