= Allen Kerr (biologist) =

Scottish-born Australian biologist (1926–2023)

Professor Allen Kerr AO FRS FAA

Professor of Plant Pathology, University of Adelaide
- In office 1980–1991

Personal details
- Born: 21 May 1926 Edinburgh, Scotland
- Died: 14 December 2023 (aged 97) Adelaide, Australia

Allen Kerr (21 May 1926 – 14 December 2023) was a Scottish-born Australian biologist. He served as Professor of Plant Pathology at the University of Adelaide. His most significant work was his study of crown gall — a plant cancer induced by Agrobacterium tumerfaciens.

== Biography ==
Kerr was born in Edinburgh on 21 May 1926 Ane gained a B.Sc. degree at the University of Edinburgh.

From 1947-1951 he was an assistant Mycologist at the North of Scotland College of Agriculture.

In 1951 he immigrated to Adelaide, South Australia to take up the position of lecturer of Plant Patholoy at the University of Adelaide. Between 1951 and his retirement, he held several positions at the University including Senior Lecturer, Reader in Plant Pathology, Head of the Department of Plant Pathology in 1990, and Head of the Department of Crop Protection in 1990.

In 1978, he was elected Fellow of the Australian Academy of Science.

From 1978-1983 he was Vice-President of the International Society for Plant Pathology and from 1980-1983 he was President of the Australasian Plant Pathology Society.

In 1986 he was elected Fellow of the Royal Society.

In 1990 he received the inaugural Australia Prize for his work with plant genetics and biology.

Kerr celebrated his 90th birthday in 2016. He died in Adelaide on 14 December 2023, at the age of 97.

== Awards ==
- 1978 - Fellow of the Australian Academy of Science (FAA)
- 1978 - Walter Buffitt Prize of the Royal Society of New South Wales
- 1982 - Ruth Allen Award of the American Phytopathological Society
- 1986 - Fellow of the Royal Society (FRS)
- 1990 - Inaugural Australia Prize
- 1991 - Foreign Associate of the US National Academy of Sciences
- 1991 - Elvin Charles Stackman Award of the University of Minnesota
- 1992 - Officer of the Order of Australia (AO)
- 1995 - Fellow of the Australasian Plant Pathology Society
- 1996 - Fellow of the American Phytopathological Society
- 2001 - Fellow of the American Academy of Microbiology
