= Anton Breinl =

Australian-Austrian tropical medicine physician

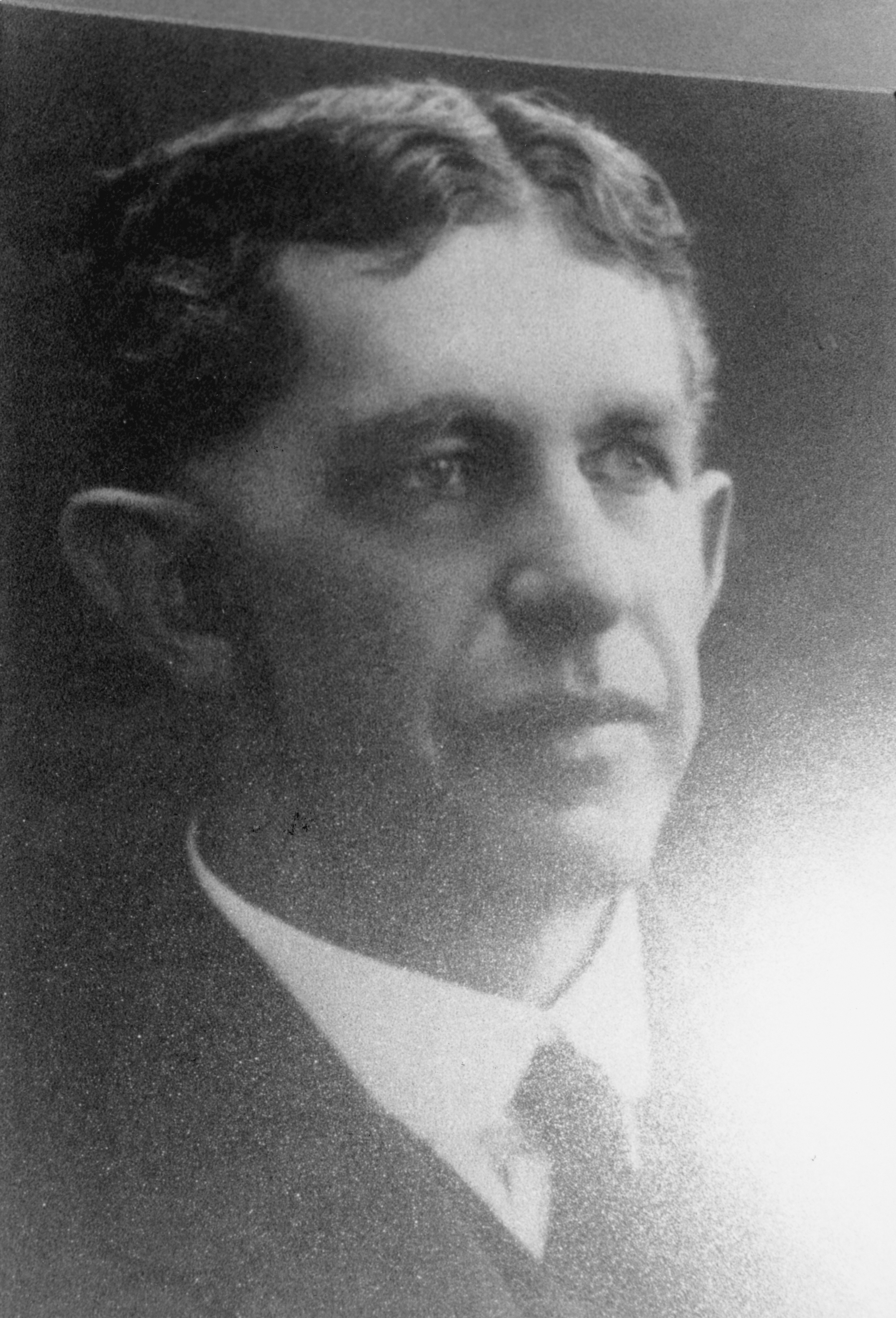
Anton Breinl, 1910

Anton Breinl (2 July 1880 – 28 June 1944) was a medical practitioner and medical researcher, who established the Australian Institute of Tropical Medicine in Townsville, Queensland, Australia.

== Early life ==
Anton Breinl was born on 2 July 1880 in Vienna. He was the son of Anton Breinl, lace manufacturer in Graslitz, Bohemia (now Kraslice in the Czech Republic) and his wife Leopoldine (née Stammhammer). He was educated in Vienna and then took his medical degree at Prague University.

== Liverpool School of Tropical Medicine ==
Breinl worked at the Liverpool School of Tropical Medicine. He was an exceptional medical scientist who had received awards for his contribution to tropical medicine, particularly for his work with Harold Wolferstan Thomas, on a cure for sleeping sickness. The treatment he helped develop, using an organic arsenical "atoxyl", later became a corner stone in the early development of chemotherapy.

== Australian Institute for Tropical Medicine ==
In 1908, responding to the concerns of the medical profession and the community, the Australian Government decided to establish an institute in North Queensland, although some concern was expressed about the distance of the research centre from southern medical schools. While generally the medical profession hoped that the inaugural doctor would be Australian, Anton Breinl was appointed and arrived in Townsville on 1 January 1910.

Breinl and his laboratory assistant Fielding, were the only members of the new Australian Institute of Tropical Medicine. They were housed in a three-room building which had been a wardsman's quarters in the grounds of Townsville Hospital. Part of the work included field work collecting native fauna for examination in the laboratory, examining data for medical practitioners and collection of data.

By 1911 Breinl was able to show the need for more staff and better premises when the Australian Government gave approval for expanded research into physiological and anthropological problems associated with white people living in the tropics. To facilitate this growth in research a new laboratory and animal house was constructed. The new Institute was opened on 28 June 1913 by Queensland Governor, Sir William MacGregor.

In 1912 the staff was increased to six with the employment of a parasitologist, bacteriologist, biochemist and entomologist. The work of the Institute expanded as the scientists investigated diseases such as malaria, dengue fever, filariasis, typhoid, hookworm, many unidentified fevers, amoebic dysentery, tropical sprue, leprosy, yaws and gangosa. During this period Breinl identified amoebic dysentery during one of his research trip to New Guinea.

The outbreak of World War 1 and the loss of hospital staff seriously affected the work of the Institute. Breinl had to assume the role of Medical Superintendent of the Townsville Hospital and Quarantine Officer while at the same time continuing his research at the Institute. During the war years he also treated servicemen sent from New Guinea and from the Middle East who were suffering from malaria. In early January 1916 Breinl resigned from the position of Quarantine Officer after becoming embroiled in a bitter public controversy over his Sudeten ancestry. While many in the community supported Breinl and valued his work, others called for his deportation or suggested that he be confined behind "barbed wire".

Despite his resignation from the Quarantine position Breinl continued his research work in the Institute. However, after the war, the Commonwealth tightened control over finances and the direction of research. Staff were not replaced and by 1920 Breinl was the only medical staff member. Research became impossible because of the lack of funds and staff for field trips. After the Institute was absorbed into the newly established Commonwealth Department of Health, Breinl was no longer able to lead the direction of research. He resigned in October 1921.

== Later life ==
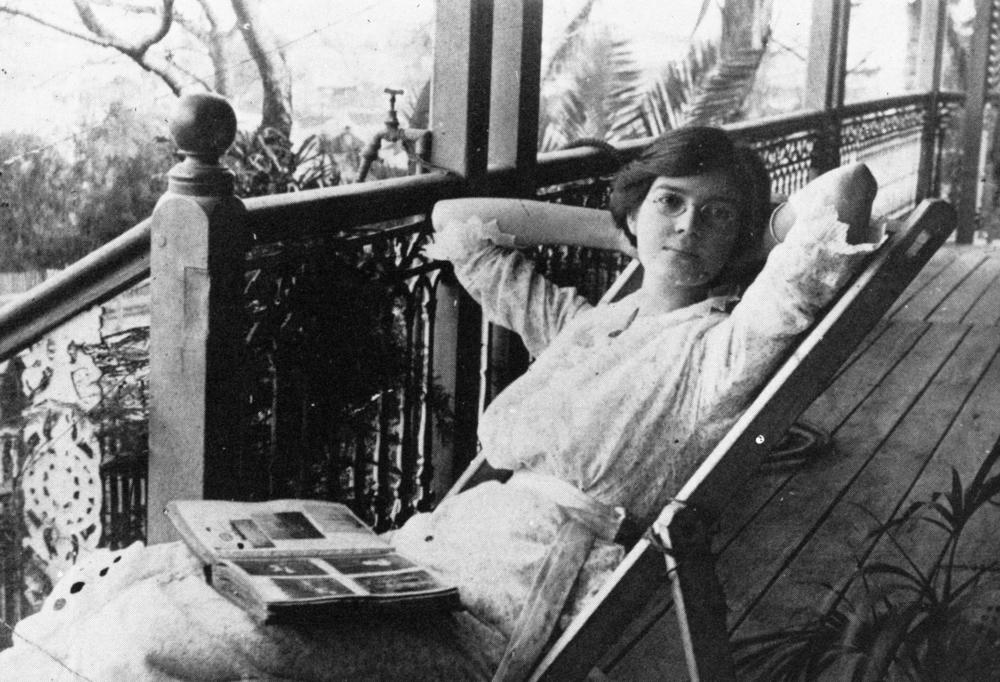
Nurse Nellie Lambton in 1919, later wife of Anton Breinl

Breinl married nurse Nellie Doriel Lambton on 21 April 1919 in Townsville. Following his resignation from the Institute in 1921, he spent the rest of his life in private practice in Townsville.

Breinl died of renal failure on 28 June 1944 at the Royal Prince Alfred Hospital in Sydney. His funeral was held on 28 June 1944 at Christ Church St Laurence in Sydney after which he was cremated at the Rookwood Crematorium.

== Legacy ==
The Anton Breinl Centre at James Cook University is named after him.
