= John Watt (physicist) =

Australian physicist (1932–2022)

- Born: John Stanley Watt; 14 May 1932
- Died: 30 July 2022 (aged 90)
- Education: University of Sydney
- Occupation: Physicist
- Relatives: Alan Watt

John Watt (14 May 1932 – 30 July 2020) was an Australian physicist, Assistant Chief of the CSIRO Division of Mineral and Process Engineering, and Australia Prize winner.

Watt was educated at the University of Sydney where he obtained a Master of Science degree in 1956. From around 1956 to 1967 he was a Research Officer with the Australian Atomic Energy Commission.

John Watt started work with the Australian Atomic Energy Commission (AAEC) as a Research Officer after graduating from The University of Sydney in 1956 with a Master of Science. He worked in the AAEC Isotope Division, becoming Head of the Radioisotope Applications Research Section in 1967. In 1982, he was transferred to the CSIRO Division of Mineral Physics as a Chief Research Scientist and Officer-in-Charge of the Division's Lucas Heights and Port Melbourne sites. He was appointed an Assistant Chief of the CSIRO Division of Mineral and Process Engineering in 1985, and returned to full-time research work as a CSIRO Fellow in 1995. He retired from CSIRO in 1997. John's research has covered a whole range of on-line analysis applications in the minerals, coal and oil industries. He pioneered this research in Australia, developing a balance between laboratory research and field trials. He also undertook the first major commercialisation of on-line mineral slurry analysis systems in the early 1970s, which led to the setting up of the on-line analysis manufacturing industry in Australia.

In 1991 Watt achieved an Australian Nuclear Association Award. In 2003 Watt was awarded a Centenary Medal for service to Australian society in applied physics.

Watt died on 30 July 2020, at the age of 90.
