= Gottfried Ungerboeck =

Austrian communications engineer

Gottfried Ungerboeck (born 15 March 1940, Vienna) is an Austrian communications engineer.

Ungerboeck received an electrical engineering degree (with emphasis on telecommunications) from Vienna University of Technology in 1964, and a Ph.D. from the Swiss Federal Institute of Technology, Zurich, in 1970. He joined IBM Austria as a systems engineer in 1965, and the IBM Zurich Research Laboratory in 1967.

At Zurich, he worked on digital signal processing and switching systems, communication and information theory. Among many contributions to the theory of data transmission, he invented trellis coded modulation.

Ungerboeck joined Broadcom in 1998, as Technical Director for Communication business line.

He has won the 2018 Shannon Award of the IEEE Information Theory Society.

== Awards and honours ==
- IBM Fellow (1984)
- IEEE Fellow (1985) for contributions to the theory and practice of digital communications.
- Broadcom Fellow and Distinguished Engineer (2006)
- IEEE Richard W. Hamming Medal (1994)
- Marconi Prize (1996)
- Australia Prize (1997)
- Golden Jubilee Award for Technological Innovation from the IEEE Information Theory Society (1998), for "the invention of trellis coded modulation".
- Claude E. Shannon Award (2018)
