= Eugene Nester =

American plant microbiologist

- Education: Cornell University (BS); Case Western Reserve University (PhD)
- Occupation: Plant microbiologist
- Awards: Australia Prize (1990)

Eugene Nester is an American plant microbiologist who has made significant contributions to the field of microbe-host interactions in plants and especially on Agrobacterium species. He has been a member of the National Academy of Sciences since 1994. He is an emeritus professor at the University of Washington.
