= Alison Todd =

Australian scientist

- Education: University of Sydney (BSc); Royal Prince Alfred Hospital (PhD)
- Scientific career
- Workplaces: Johnson and Johnson; SpeeDx
- Thesis: Molecular analysis of regulatory and transforming sequences of the human N-ras gene

Alison Todd is an Australian scientist who is holder of 18 patents (as at July 2019), and a co-founder and chief scientific officer of SpeeDx with Elisa Mokany. The company manufactures and sells tests for detecting infectious pathogens and identifying antibiotic resistance. The biomedical company, co-founded by Todd, develops diagnostic tools. Todd mentors younger scientists and entrepreneurs, as well as advocating for greater gender diversity in leaders in STEM.

== Career ==
Todd is the Chief Scientific Officer of SpeeDx, which is a molecular diagnostics company which she and Elisa Mokany started. Todd and Mokany have 18 patent families between them. They have brought 11 medical diagnostic tests for the management of clinical disease.

Todd developed several novel molecular analytical technologies which have been used for basic research, preclinical/clinical drug development and in vitro diagnostics. Her expertise include nucleic acid chemistry, particularly target amplification and catalytic DNA technologies, and the biology of cancer and viral diseases. Prior to founding SpeeDx, Todd was a Senior Research Director at Johnson and Johnson Research Pty Limited, Sydney.

== Research ==
Todd describes her "Eureka moment", "It all began when Elisa joined my group at Johnson & Johnson Research (JJR), we were already exploring ways to exploit DNAzymes (deoxyribozymes) for diagnostic applications. These fascinating molecules are simple, short, synthetic DNA sequences (oligonucleotides) that can catalyse reactions in a manner analogous to protein enzymes. Although catalytic RNA (ribozymes) had been found in nature, catalytic DNA had not, and it had been assumed DNA would not have similar properties. However, a few years earlier, undeterred by dogma, Jerry Joyce and co-workers at Scripps had conducted ‘evolution in a test tube’".

== Select publications ==
- Santoro, S., and Joyce, G. (1997) A general purpose RNA-cleaving SNA enzyme. Proc. Natl. Acad. Sci. USA 94, 4262-4266.
- Todd, A.V., et al. (2000) DzyNA-PCR: use of DNAzymes to detect and quantify nucleic acid sequences in a real-time fluorescent format Clin. Chem. 46, 625-630.
- Mokany, E., et al. (2010) MNAzymes, a Versatile New Class of Nucleic Acid Enzymes That Can Function as Biosensors and Molecular Switches J. Am. Chem. Soc. 132, 1051-1059.
- Mokany, E., et al. (2013) MNAzyme qPCR with Superior Multiplexing Capacity Clin. Chem. 59, 419-426.

Todd's publications can be found at (Google Scholar).

== Awards and recognition ==
- Johnson & Johnson Philip B. Hofmann Research Scientist Award,
- Todd was selected as one of the six Boss True Leaders Game Changers due to her research fighting superbugs.
- Fellow of the Australian Academy of Technological Sciences and Engineering (FTSE)

== Media ==
2017 — Todd's work was referenced in The Australian Financial Review, where she was described as a 'frontline fighter in the war on superbugs'.

2017 — The Sydney Morning Herald described the formation of Todd's company, as well as their concern that women were under-represented in STEMM, and the hiring and mentoring practices reflected in their company.
