= Faculty of Travel Medicine =

The Faculty of Travel Medicine (FTM) of The Australasian College of Tropical Medicine (ACTM) is an Australasian medical association. It was founded on 9 March 2000 by the ACTM College Council. Faculty Chairs have included Professor Peter A. Leggat(1999–2001), Dr Mathew Klein (2001–2010) and Dr Jenny Sisson (2010–Present).

Before it was founded, the International Society of Travel Medicine (ISTM) was the only major professional organisation representing those working in travel medicine in the region; it still has approximately 100 members in Australasia. The ACTM and the ISTM have co-hosted a joint Scientific Meeting in 2008, the Asia Pacific International Conference on Travel Medicine. One other Faculty of Travel Medicine has been established in 2006 as part of the Royal College of Physicians and Surgeons of Glasgow.

== Aims ==
The aims of the organization are to:

- "Act as a professional faculty in travel medicine, providing accreditation and re-accreditation in travel medicine;
- Assist in the production of policy documents on travel medicine;
- At as a reference body on travel medicine for the College;
- Formulate a travel medicine section within Annual Scientific Meetings;
- Develop curriculum guidelines for and assist in delivering training courses in travel medicine;
- Network with other appropriate organisations in travel medicine;
- Apply for grants and seek sponsorship for College programs relating to travel medicine;
- Develop and referee publications in travel medicine on behalf of the College;
- Maintain an internet site for the College on travel medicine;
- Seek accreditation for travel medicine programs organised by the College with other professional accreditation agencies;
- Recognize members who have made a significant contribution to travel medicine through the College Awards and Honours program."

Today the organization incorporates a Joint Faculty of Expedition and Wilderness Medicine (see Wilderness medicine) reflecting the importance of this special interest. The Foundation Chairperson of the Faculty of Expedition and Expedition Medicine is Associate Professor Marc Shaw. It also incorporates an ACTM Special Interest Group, the Travel Health Advisory Group (THAG), which is a joint initiative between travel industry and travel medicine professionals that aims to promote healthy travel amongst travellers.

== Membership ==
Applications for membership are evaluated on the basis of the applicant's academic and professional qualifications, experience and contributions to travel medicine or a related field, usually by way of publications, but other contributions are also considered. Applicants must also demonstrate a commitment to continuing professional development and must affiliate with the ACTM. Applicants may also enter by passing an approved examination in travel medicine considered in relation to meeting the academic requirements.

Fellows, Associate Fellows and Members of the FTM are entitled use the postnominal letters FFTM ACTM, AFFTM ACTM and MFTM ACTM, respectively. Honorary Fellows and Members of the College are entitled to use Hon. FFTM ACTM and Hon. MFTM ACTM, respectively. The various grades of people associated with the Sub-Faculty of Expedition Medicine qualify their postnominal letters with "(Exped Med)", as in "FFTM (Exped Med) ACTM"

Notable Honorary Fellows of the organization include Emeritus Professor Robert Steffen. Notable Honorary Members of the Faculty include the South African Society of Travel Medicine. There is also a non-professional grade of Associate available to interested persons, which does not carry any entitlement to post-nominals.

New members may receive their College and Faculty testamurs at a Convocation of the ACTM. The first Convocation was held in 1994 and Convocation XX was held in 2008. College and Faculty awards and honours are also presented at these Convocations, usually held during a Scientific Meeting of the College.
