= Kenneth McCracken (physicist) =

Australian physicist (born 1933)

- Born: 7 August 1933 (age 93); Brisbane
- Education: University of Tasmania
- Known for: Space science
- Awards: Pawsey Medal (1969); Australia Prize
- Scientific career
- Fields: Astrophysics
- Workplaces: Massachusetts Institute of Technology; NASA; University of Adelaide

Kenneth G. McCracken, AO (born 7 August 1933) is an Australian physicist and leading space scientist, foundation Director of the CSIRO (Commonwealth Scientific and Industrial Research Organisation) Office of Space Science and Applications and Foundation Chief of the CSIRO Division of Mineral Physics. He had earlier worked in the United States of America for several years where he occasionally worked as a consultant for NASA (National Aeronautics and Space Administration).

Kenneth McCracken was born in Brisbane, Queensland, the only child of Richard McCracken and Elisabeth Menzies (both Scottish emigrants). Kenneth was educated at Morooka Primary, Brisbane (1939), Deepdene Primary, Melbourne (1940–43) and Telopea Park Primary, Canberra (1943–44); his secondary schooling was at Canberra High School (1945–46) and Hobart High School (1946–49).

McCracken then studied at the University of Tasmania where he obtained a Bachelor of Science with Honours (BSc (Hons)) in 1954; and a Doctor of Philosophy (PhD) in 1959. From 1961 to 1962 McCracken was assistant professor at Massachusetts Institute of Technology; from 1963 to 1965 he was a member of the NASA Space Radiation Protection Committee; from 1966 to 1969, he was a professor at the University of Adelaide.

McCracken was awarded the Pawsey Medal of the Australian Academy of Science in 1969, the Gold Medal of the Australian Society of Exploration Geophysicists, the Australia Prize (jointly) in 1995 and the Ian William Wark Medal (2001) and Haddon King Medal (2003) of the Australian Academy of Science. He was elected a Fellow of the Australian Academy of Science in 1987 and appointed an Officer of the Order of Australia (AO) in 1989.

McCracken was the Principal Investigator of an experiment on the Pioneer 7 mission.

His entertaining autobiography biography is "Blast Off", ISBN 9781741106442, published by New Holland Publishers in 2008.
