= World Safety Organization =

The World Safety Organization (WSO) is an international professional association in safety. The WSO was founded in 1975 in Manila, Republic of the Philippines, as a result of a gathering of over 1,000 safety professionals from all continents at the First World Safety and Accident Prevention Congress (WOSAPCON) held from 16 to 21 November 1975. The Second WOSAPCON was held in Singapore from 3–14 July 1978. The WSO gained Special Consultative Status Category II (NGOs) with the UN Economic and Social Council (ECOSOC) in 1987. The WSO World Management Center was established in the US in 1987, to be responsible for all WSO activities, which includes facilitating its relationship to the United Nations (UN) and its cooperation with professional safety, environmental and other allied organizations. Since the establishment of the WSO World Management Centre in the US, international conferences have been conducted annually in the USA.

The WSO is governed by a 21-member Board of Directors and is headed by a President/Director-General, which is currently Alfredo A. De La Rosa Jr. Its operations are managed by International Offices, Chapters, Divisions, Committees and specially designated WSO Collaborating Centers. A Global Safety Roundtable is also conducted annually during the WSO international conferences held in the US, where participants can exchange expertise, experience and knowledge with their counterparts from other countries on new methods and programs being implemented in their respective areas of specialization. The Global Safety Roundtable is also a forum for the development of potential resolutions to UN ECOSOC.

== Objectives of the WSO ==
The Objectives of the WSO are to:

- To encourage the effective exchange of information and experiences between members of the WSO;
- Collaborate with other international organizations in areas of mutual concern;
- Promote the continuous advancement of safety and accident prevention technology;
- Strive for a universal level of professionalism and competence among its members and all professionals and practitioners in the multi-discipline of occupational and environmental safety, health and accident prevention; and to
- Advance the WSO overall theme...."Making Safety a Way of Life . . . Worldwide."

== Membership and Certification ==
Membership of the WSO is open to all interested safety professionals (as Affiliate Members) and to others interested in safety (as Associate Members). It also offers Student, Institutional and Corporate Membership. The WSO offers 16 Certification programs, such as the Certified Safety Executive, Certified Safety Manager, Certified Safety Specialist and Certified Safety and Security Director.
