= Rick Speare =

Australian public health physician and veterinary surgeon

Richard Speare
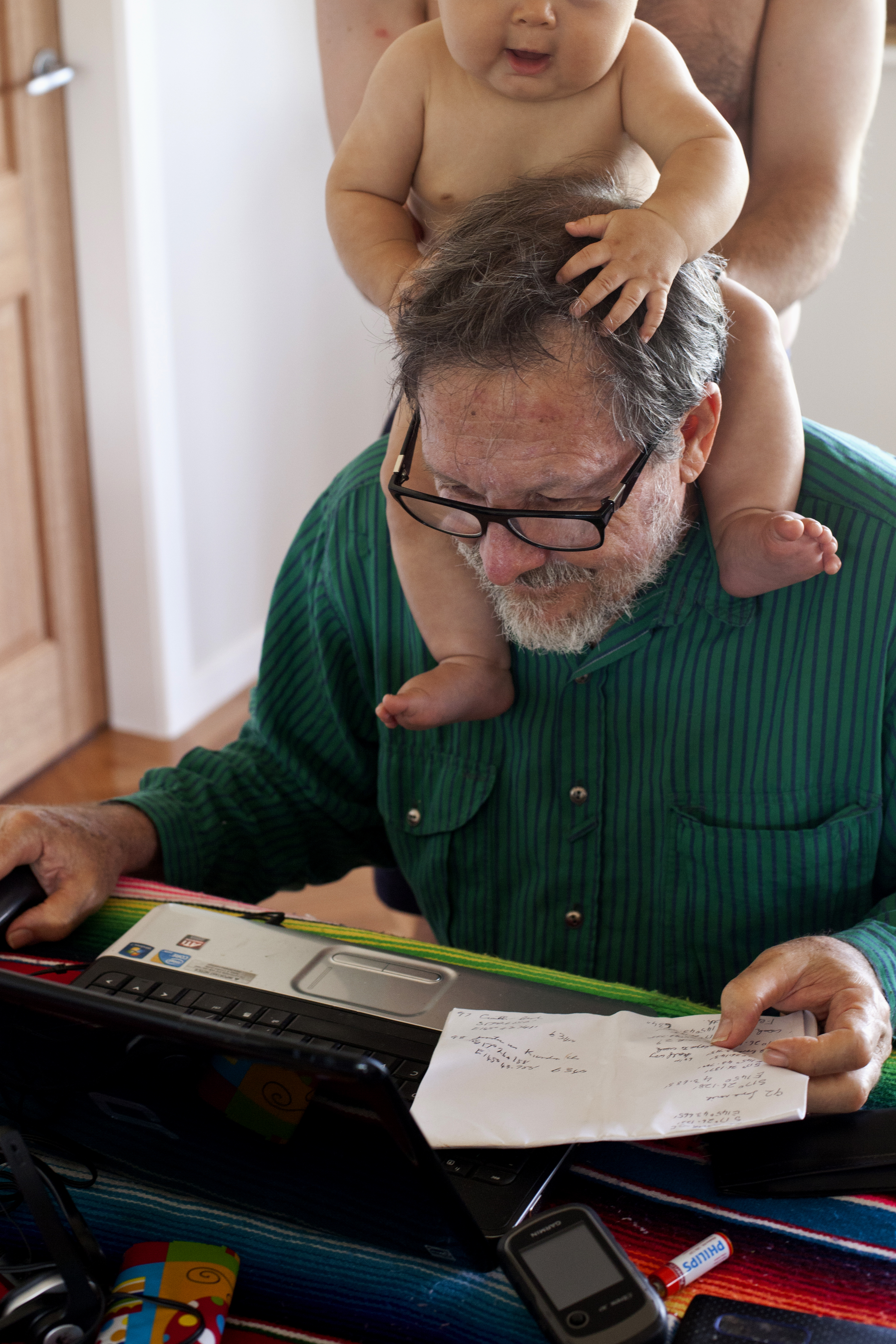
- Born: 2 August 1947
- Died: 5 June 2016 (aged 68); Atherton Tablelands
- Known for: research on chytridiomycosis
- Spouse: Kerry Kelly
- Awards: AM
- Scientific career
- Workplaces: James Cook University; University of Otago
- Website: www.tropicalhealthsolutions.com/rickspeare

Richard "Rick" Speare (2 August 1947 – 5 June 2016) was an Australian public health physician and veterinary surgeon. He is best known for his research on animal diseases, particularly his work on chytridiomycosis in amphibians.

== Research career ==
Speare worked clinically as both a medical doctor and a veterinarian. He joined James Cook University in 1988 as a research fellow, and was appointed an associate professor in 1991. His research covered a suite of diseases, including paramphistomid trematodes of the agile wallaby, scabies, head lice, malaria, and Australian bat lyssavirus. However, he is best known for his work on amphibian diseases such as salmonella and ranaviruses in cane toads, Mucor amphibiorum in the Australian green tree frog, and, most notably, chytridiomycosis.

Speare completed his PhD on the helminth parasite Strongyloides in 1986. He published an important book chapter on the morphology of Strongyloides spp. in "Strogyloidiasis: A Major Roundworm Infection of Man", edited by David Grove (1989). Speare performed significant work on the public health control of human strongyloidiasis caused by Strongyloides stercoralis, particularly in Aboriginal Australian communities. He was the founder of the Australian National Working Group on Strongyloidiasis.

Speare was Director of the JCU School of Public Health and Tropical Medicine from 2009 to 2012 and taught numerous subjects in the university's Masters of Public Health (Tropical Medicine) program, including Human Parasitology. He also undertook a guest lecturing role at Tufts University in the United States.

In 2005, Speare and two colleagues infected themselves with hookworms to study the body's response to the parasites. Speare was instrumental in founding the Atoifi Health Research Group in the Solomon Islands, to help improve public health in the region.

== Retirement and death ==
Speare retired from James Cook University in 2012, and was made a member of the Order of Australia in the same year. He remained an emeritus professor and continued to publish research. He was also a director of the private company Tropical Health Solutions Pty Ltd, whose aims were to "improve health in the tropics through undertaking applied research to generate evidence for decisions and through building research capacity in local researchers." Speare died in a car accident in the Atherton Tablelands on 5 June 2016. He was survived by his wife Kerry, three sons, two daughters and five grandchildren.
