= Wilderness medicine education in the US =

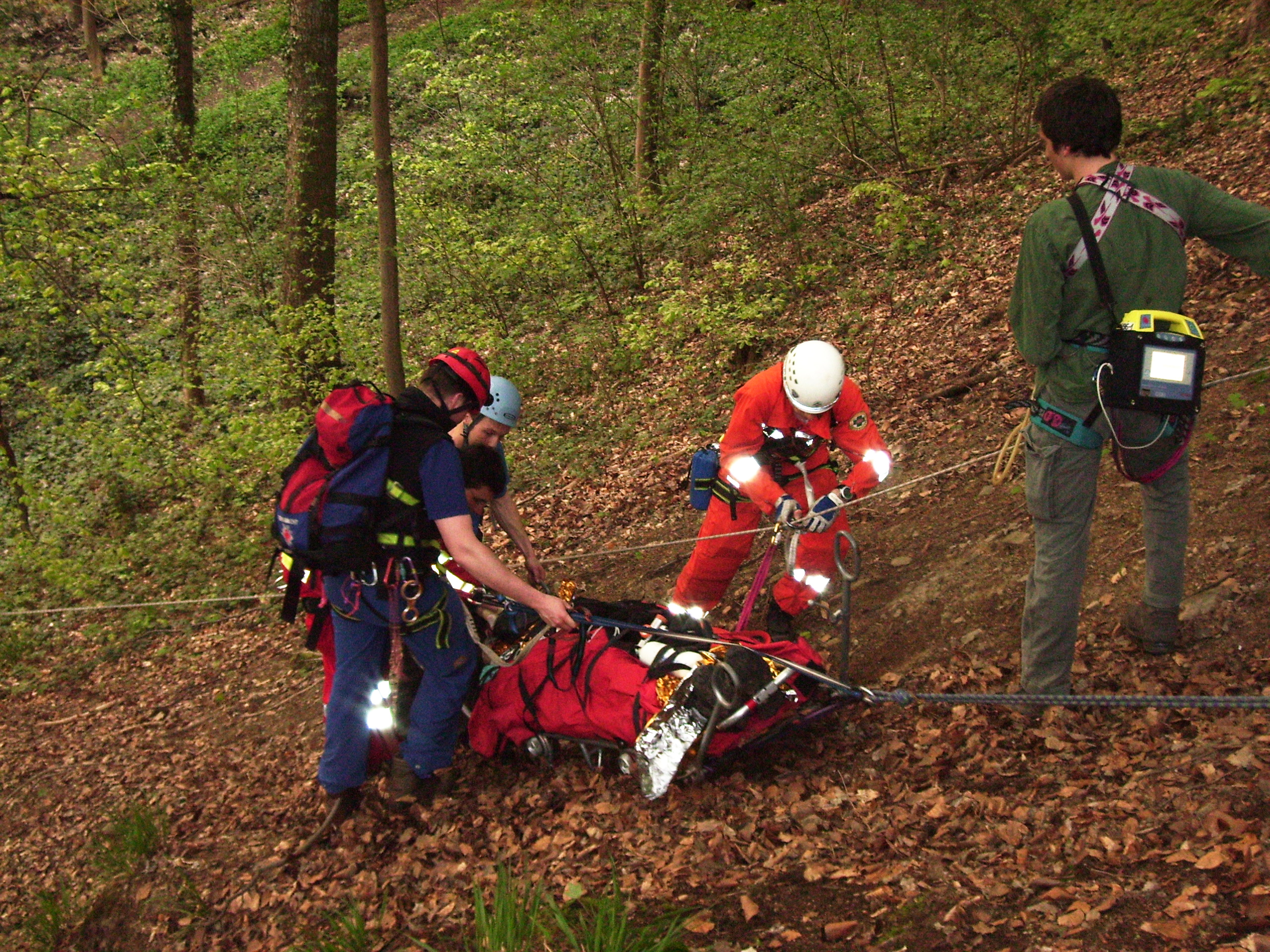
Rescue rope training

Wilderness medicine is defined by difficult patient access, limited equipment, and environmental extremes. Today, wilderness or expedition medicine is practiced by Wilderness First Responders, Wilderness EMTs, Remote/Offshore/Wilderness Paramedics, and Physicians on expeditions, in outdoor education, search and rescue, mountain rescue, remote area operations including research, exploration, and offshore oil platforms, as well as tactical environments. In mainland Europe, where mountain rescue is done by paid professionals, there are courses for physicians that help qualify them to be mountain rescue or expedition doctors. Many of these courses lead to an International Diploma in Mountain Medicine, which is recognized by the Union Internationale des Associations Alpinistes.

== US ==
In the United States, where mountain and other wilderness rescue on land is usually done by volunteers, there is no equivalent diploma. However, there are many wilderness medicine conferences at which medical professionals can earn continuing education credits, and some medical schools (for example, at the University of New Mexico) have begun offering electives in wilderness medicine. Other electives are based in community training centers and not medical schools, such as the Carolina Wilderness EMS Externship.

== Wilderness Medical Society ==
The Internationally active Wilderness Medical Society is an organization dedicated to wilderness medicine education and research, and they conduct multiple conferences annually in this area. Anyone interested in wilderness medicine can join the organization as an associate member, and receive their magazine, Wilderness Medicine. Their peer-reviewed journal, Wilderness and Environmental Medicine, is archived on their website (www.wms.org), and back issues are accessible to the public at no cost.

Training in wilderness medicine is specialized, involving advanced practices and protocols due to the distance from hospitals and physicians. Common US certifications include Wilderness First Aid, Wilderness First Responder, and Wilderness EMT. While there is no legislation on standards of care for wilderness emergency care, there is a consensus of wilderness medical experts published by the Wilderness Medical Society

== Medical Schools ==
Wilderness Medicine is popular in medical school communities, and many student groups hold their own Wilderness Medicine Conferences. One of the earliest examples is the Carolina Wilderness Medicine Seminar, organized at UNC-Chapel Hill by medical students Seth C. Hawkins and Jenny Graham in March 1998 and repeated in 2000. The ACWM conference ran from 2008-2012 and was notable in that it rotated to a new host medical school in the American southern Appalachians every year. All these conferences commonly feature prominent members of the wilderness medicine community as guest speakers and workshop leaders. Additionally, many top-tier emergency physicians and surgeons are active in the field.

== Sports oriented institutions ==
Many organizations offer training in wilderness emergency care to lay people, which may include techniques that go beyond urban first aid or EMT training, such as reducing dislocations. The National Ski Patrol (www.nsp.org), a volunteer organization with a congressional charter, has an 80-hour course to train patrollers in Outdoor Emergency Care, which meets the standards for an EMT (Emergency Medical Technician) course. Stonehearth Open Learning Opportunities (SOLO, the world’s oldest continuously operating school of wilderness medicine) and Remote Medical International offer courses up to the Wilderness EMT level. The American Safety and Health Institute has a Wilderness Emergency Care program that offers a full range of courses including Wilderness First Aid, Wilderness First Responder, and Wilderness EMT Upgrade. Most outdoor organizations that take people into wilderness settings now require their trip leaders, guides, or camp councilors to be certified in such a course.

== Other educational organizations ==
- Stonehearth Open Learning Opportunities
- American Red Cross
- Canadian Red Cross
- Remote Medical International
- Appalachian Center for Wilderness Medicine
- Carolina Wilderness EMS Externship

== See also ==
- Wilderness Medical Society
- Wilderness diarrhea
- Travel medicine
- Wilderness medical emergency
- List of wilderness medical emergencies
