= Wilderness first aid certification in the US =

Wilderness first aid as an established medical discipline is a relatively new phenomenon compared to the more established field of prehospital emergency medicine. While instructional guidelines for curriculum for prehospital emergency medical care have been standardized by the U.S. federal government, there are no current federal regulations defining scopes of practice for varying levels of wilderness medicine.

Industry groups in the field of wilderness medicine have worked to create such standards. The Wilderness Medical Society published The WMS Practice Guidelines for Wilderness Emergency Care in 1987, and updated the document several times through 2006. WMS now publishes Practice Guidelines updates in its journal Wilderness & Environmental Medicine.

Minimum guidelines and scope of practice for Wilderness First Aid training were published in the journal Wilderness and Environmental Medicine in 2013. These guidelines and scope of practice were developed with input from NOLS Wilderness Medicine Institute, SOLO, Wilderness Medicine Training Center, Aerie, Wilderness Medicine Outfitters, Remote Medical International, Desert Mountain Medicine, and others.

A group consensus position paper on minimum guidelines and scope of practice for Wilderness First Responder (WFR) was published in 2016 by the Wilderness Medicine Education Collaborative. The collaborative is led by representatives of NOLS Wilderness Medicine, SOLO Wilderness Medicine, Wilderness Medicine Training Center International, Wilderness Medical Associates International, Aerie Backcountry Medicine, and Desert Mountain Medicine.

== Certification ==
The American Red Cross Wilderness & Remote First Aid (2010) certification is valid for 2 years.

In Canada, the first wilderness first aid course were first taught in the mid 1980s and the first organization (defunct 1986 to 1998) to adopt standards was the Wilderness First Aid and Safety Association of BC.

NOLS Wilderness Medicine, Wilderness Medical Associates International, Wilderness Medicine Training Center International, Aerie Backcountry Medicine, SOLO Wilderness Medicine, Desert Mountain Medicine and other small schools offer certification in wilderness first aid, wilderness advanced first aid, wilderness first responder, and wilderness EMS.

The Boy Scouts of America require there to be at least two Wilderness First Aid certified participants for High-Adventure treks.

=== In Scouting ===
Wilderness First Aid (WFA) is the assessment of and treatment given to an ill or injured person in a remote environment where definitive care by a physician and/or rapid transport is not readily available. A BSA-led task force has developed WFA doctrine and curriculum. Participants will learn how to assess, treat, and (when possible) contain emergencies within the scope of their training. Youth and adult Scout leaders over age 14 are invited to participate and earn their certification.

== See also ==
- Wilderness first aid
- Wilderness medicine
- Wilderness Medical Society
- National Association of Emergency Medical Technicians
- Outdoor Emergency Care
- Certified first responder
- National First Responders Organization
- Wilderness Emergency Medical Technician
- Wilderness First Responder
