= Wilderness medicine education =

Wilderness medicine education can refer to professional training or preparation for backcountry users such as hikers, climbers, skiers or kayakers.

- Emergency medicine
- Wilderness medicine education in the US
- Wilderness Medical Society
- Wilderness first aid certification in the US
