= Appalachian Center for Wilderness Medicine =

Non profit medicine org

The Appalachian Center for Wilderness Medicine (ACWM) is a non-profit organization dedicated to promoting wilderness medicine in the southern Appalachian region of the United States of America. Dr. Seth C. Hawkins, an emergency physician who specializes in EMS and wilderness medicine, founded ACWM in 2007 in the state of North Carolina. It is the first regional wilderness medicine non-profit of its kind in the United States. Contemporary authorities in wilderness medicine have noted its importance in establishing a mechanism for regionally pooling information and resources in a field that otherwise has little connection between local or regional experts. Critical to that effort have been uses of the internet in ways not previously seen in wilderness medicine.

At the time of its founding, ACWM served the American states of North Carolina, South Carolina, Georgia, Tennessee, Virginia, and West Virginia. With the Knob Creek Resolution of 2011, ACWM expanded to include Alabama, Maryland, and Kentucky.

== Programs ==
Although its primary purpose as a non-profit is promoting communication and awareness of programs already in place, ACWM developed a number of programs of its own to fill holes in the region. Chief among them was an Advanced Wilderness Life Support (AWLS) course and the ACWM Southeastern Student Wilderness Medicine Conference-–neither previously available on a regular basis in the southern Appalachians.

=== AWLS Course ===
The ACWM version of the AWLS course has been recognized for its innovative use of high-technology medical simulation, using state of the art simulation mannequins in wilderness scenarios, as well as its role in attracting healthcare professionals into the nascent profession of wilderness medicine. The ACWM AWLS course was run continuously from 2007-2016 in southern Appalachian locations: in Linville Gorge NC from 2007-2009, in New River Gorge WV from 2010-2012, in Black Mountain NC from 2014-2015 (with transitional organizing in 2013), and in Roanoke VA in 2016. In 2012 Outside Magazine cited the AWLS program as one of the top four wilderness medicine training programs in the United States.

=== Student conference ===
Over a thousand medical students and wilderness enthusiasts were introduced to wilderness medicine through the ACWM student conference. It used a novel organizational strategy, moving every year to a new medical school in the southeast. This strategy increased geographic access throughout the region and provided organizational experience for the medical students at each host school. In the summer of 2012, the conference became independent of the Center and is now run through Blue Ridge Adventure Medicine as the Southeastern Student Wilderness Medicine Conference. The Center promotes this independently configured conference as it does all quality wilderness medicine conferences in the southeast, also including the Southeast Wilderness Medicine Conference, the Appalachian Wilderness Medicine Conference, and Wilderness Medical Society conferences in the region.

Past ACWM Southeastern Student Wilderness Medicine Conference locations:

 2008:  Wake Forest School of Medicine, Winston-Salem, NC
 2009:  UNC-Chapel Hill School of Medicine, Chapel Hill, NC [9]
 2010:  Medical College of Georgia, Augusta, GA[link removed] [10]
 2011:  Quillen College of Medicine, East Tennessee State University, TN [11]
 2012:  Wake Forest School of Medicine, Winston Salem, NC [12]

=== Other programs and partnerships ===
In addition to its primary regional organizing function, ACWM has served as an incubator for other local and national programs, such as the Green EMS Initiative, a precursor to the International Institute for Sustainability in Emergency Services. It has also served as a partner in multiple regional wilderness medicine and safety initiatives. These include partnership with the New River Alliance of Climbers in Fayetteville WV (arising from the need to address wilderness medicine education within the southeastern climbing community) and Friends of Seneca (positioning first aid caches at the popular and historic climbing area Seneca Rocks). ACWM staff have also provided instruction at multiple conferences and festivals, including the Roanoke GO Outside Festival and the New River Rendezvous.

== Mountain Laurel Award ==
The ACWM also sponsors the Mountain Laurel Award every year, which has been cited as the most prestigious wilderness medicine award in the southeastern United States. This lifetime achievement award is given to individuals or groups who have made “extraordinary, lasting and substantial contributions to wilderness medicine in the southern Appalachians.”

=== Mountain Laurel Award Recipients ===
- 2008: Tom Kessler (Gallatin TN): course director for the Wilderness Medical Society Student Elective, held in Townsend, Tennessee, which trains students from around the world in wilderness medicine
- 2009: Jack Ditty (Morgantown WV): founder and director of the Appalachian Wilderness Medicine Conference (a conference not affiliated with ACWM)
- 2010: Michael Caudell (Augusta GA): founder of MEDWAR, a wilderness medicine adventure course with versions now appearing around the world; founder and current director of the Georgia Health Sciences University Wilderness Medicine program
- 2011: Justin Padgett (Cullowhee NC): founder of Landmark Learning, a premier wilderness medicine school based in the southeast; founder of Disaster Medic program; author and founder of Starguard Wilderness Lifeguard program
- 2012: Chris Moore (Chattanooga TN): founder of the Southeastern Wilderness Medicine Conference; Venue Medical Coordinator, Whitewater Competition, 1996 Atlanta Olympic Games; Medical Director, World Cup Whitewater Competition; Founder, Wilderness Medical Society Environmental Council; Wilderness Medical Society's Delegate to the 1992 Earth Summit in Rio de Janeiro
- 2013: Slim Ray (Asheville NC): internationally recognized expert on swiftwater and river rescue; author of River Rescue and Swiftwater Rescue; course developer and instructor with Rescue 3 and Nantahala Outdoor Center
- 2014: Seth C. Hawkins (Morganton NC): founder of Appalachian Center for Wilderness Medicine, the Appalachian Mountain Rescue Team, and the Carolina Wilderness EMS Externship; co-founder of the Wilderness EMS Medical Director Course, Carolina Wilderness Medicine, and Vertical Medicine Resources; Executive Editor of Wilderness Medicine Magazine and first physician ever named a Master Fellow of the Academy of Wilderness Medicine
- 2015: Jonathon Bryant (Almond NC): founder and director of MedicForce; wilderness medicine instructor for SOLO Southeast
- 2016: William Fred Baty (Knoxville TN): Asst Chief, City of Knoxville Fire Department; Director, Roane State Community College Wilderness EMS program; faculty, Wilderness Medical Society Student Elective
- 2017-2018: No award granted
- 2019: Stephanie Lareau (Roanoke VA): Co-founder, Southeastern Student Wilderness Medicine Conference; Director, Virginia Tech-Carilion Wilderness Medicine Fellowship; prior President, Appalachian Center for Wilderness Medicine
- 2020: Paul Auerbach (formerly of Durham, NC and Nashville, TN): Co-founder, Wilderness Medical Society; Editor, Auerbach's Wilderness Medicine; Founding Editor, Journal of Wilderness Medicine (now Wilderness and Environmental Medicine); Author, Medicine for the Outdoors; Author, Field Guide to Wilderness Medicine; Author, Field Guide to Hazardous Marine Life
