= RMI =

RMI may refer to:

== Science and technology ==
- Radio magnetic indicator, an instrument used in aircraft navigation
- Repetitive motion injury, an injury to the musculoskeletal and nervous systems
- Richtmyer–Meshkov instability, an instability occurring when two fluids with different densities are impulsively accelerated
- Risk of malignancy index, for ovarian cancer

=== Computing ===
- Remote Method Invocation, an application-programming interface used in Java environments
- .rmi, a file extension for a RIFF MIDI file

== Organizations ==
- RMI Corporation, a semiconductor company manufacturing CPUs
- RMI Titanium Company, U.S. titanium fabricator now called RTI International Metals
- Railcar Management LLC, a rail information services software company and subsidiary of GE Transportation
- RMI Expeditions, a mountain guide company based in Ashford, Washington, United States
- Remote Medical International, provides medical support in remote areas
- Rocky Mountain Institute, a non-profit energy-conservation organization in the United States of America
- Rocky Mount Instruments, manufacturer of the RMI 368 Electra-Piano and Harpsichord
- Royal Manchester Institution (1823–1882), a learned society promoting the arts in Manchester, England
- Royal Meteorological Institute of Belgium, a federal institute engaged in scientific research in meteorology
- WRMI (branded Radio Miami International) an American shortwave radio station, often referred to on air as RMI
- Reaction Motors Inc., an early American maker of liquid-fueled rocket engines

== Places ==
- Federico Fellini International Airport (IATA code), near Rimini, Italy
- Republic of the Marshall Islands, a nation-state in Micronesia

== Other uses ==
- Radio Massacre International, a British electronic-music group
- Ramapough Mountain Indians, a Native American group
- Rank mobility index, a measure of change in population-rank
- Revenu minimum d'insertion, a form of welfare introduced in France in 1988

== See also ==
- RM1 (disambiguation)
