= Seth C. Hawkins =

American poet

Seth C. Hawkins MD, FACEP, FAEMS, MFAWM, MFAEG
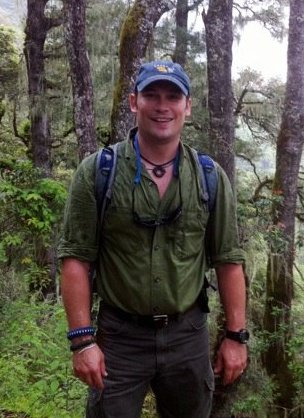
- Hawkins working in Bhutan
- Born: 1971 (age 54–55); Finger Lakes Region, New York, U.S.
- Other name: Seth Collings Hawkins
- Education: Yale University; University of North Carolina at Chapel Hill; University of Pittsburgh
- Occupations: Physician, writer, anthropologist
- Known for: Founder, Appalachian Center for Wilderness Medicine; Founder, Appalachian Mountain Rescue Team; Founder, Carolina Wilderness EMS Externship

Seth Christopher Collings Hawkins (born 1971) is an American emergency physician, writer, anthropologist, and organizational innovator. He has made notable contributions to the fields of wilderness medicine, Emergency Medical Services (EMS), and medical humanities. His work has particularly specialized in EMS and wilderness medicine in the southeastern United States, where he is the founder of the Appalachian Center for Wilderness Medicine, the Appalachian Mountain Rescue Team, and the Carolina Wilderness EMS Externship.

== Early life and education ==
Hawkins was born in the Finger Lakes Region of New York state and raised in Middletown, Connecticut. He graduated from Yale College where he earned a Bachelor of Arts in Anthropology. During that time he also earned Wilderness Emergency Medical Technician certification at Stonehearth Open Learning Opportunities in Conway, New Hampshire. He subsequently worked in Vermont and Colorado as a volunteer Emergency Medical Technician, ski instructor, and rafting guide before returning to Bryn Mawr College to complete his premedical training in 1994.

Hawkins earned his Doctorate of Medicine from the University of North Carolina at Chapel Hill School of Medicine in 2000. He completed his medical training with a residency in Emergency Medicine at the University of Pittsburgh Affiliated Residency in Emergency Medicine, where he was recognized with the University of Pittsburgh Ron Stewart Excellence in Teaching Award in 2003.

== Career ==
=== Humanities/anthropology ===
While a medical student, Hawkins co-founded iris: the UNC journal of medicine, literature & visual art, a Medical Humanities journal still currently in production. Hawkins was a charter member of the American College of Emergency Physicians (ACEP) Medical Humanities Section, and established and currently serves as a judge for the annual ACEP Writers Award. He also served as Chair of this Section from 2019 to 2022. He authored the first structured analysis of emergency medicine creative writing in the journal Academic Emergency Medicine, which introduced and explored the concept of "emergency medicine narratives" and has been cited as a landmark humanities study in emergency medicine. He also edited the anthology Emergency Medicine Narratives: An Emergency Medicine Humanities Collection, Vol I published by ACEP in 2019. He currently writes the "Words Matter" column in Emergency Medicine News. His poetry and prose has been published widely in emergency medicine journals and magazines. He also continues an active practice as an anthropologist — he is a professional member of the American Anthropological Association as well as a Fellow in the Society for Applied Anthropology and Affiliate Faculty in the Department of Anthropology at Wake Forest University. He has a research and publication focus on the anthropology of pain, medical anthropology, and expeditionary anthropology.

=== Wilderness medicine and EMS ===
While a medical student at the University of North Carolina at Chapel Hill School of Medicine, Hawkins and Jenny Graham co-founded Carolina Wilderness Medicine, one of the first wilderness medicine student interest groups in the country and one of his first actions as an organizational innovator. This student interest group is still active at UNC-Chapel Hill (www.med.unc.edu/wmig). Further organizational innovations included student-run southeastern wilderness medicine conferences—the first of their kind in the southeast—held in 1998 and 2000 in Chapel Hill and initiated by Hawkins and Graham.

In 2007, continuing as an organizational innovator, Hawkins founded the Appalachian Center for Wilderness Medicine, a regional wilderness medicine nonprofit organization. Hawkins served as the medical director for the Burke EMS Special Operations Team, the first EMS-based wilderness rescue team in North Carolina, from 2008 to 2021. This team serves the Linville Gorge Wilderness Area, the deepest gorge in the eastern United States, as well as South Mountains State Park, the largest state park in NC. In 2011, in conjunction with Drs. Michael Millin and Will Smith, he co-developed the Wilderness EMS Medical Director Course. This was the first such course to be jointly endorsed by the Wilderness Medical Society and the National Association of EMS Physicians. The Journal of EMS recognized Hawkins, along with Millin and Smith, as one of the Top 10 EMS Innovators of 2011 for the development of this course.

Hawkins helped develop a distance-accessible baccalaureate wilderness EMS program while on the faculty at Western Carolina University. In 2011, continuing as an organizational innovator, he founded the Carolina Wilderness EMS Externship, a unique wilderness medicine rotation for medical students and residents specifically focused on wilderness EMS activities. He also serves as medical director of the North Carolina State Parks system and Western Piedmont Community College. On Earth Day 2012 he established the International Institute for Sustainability in Emergency Services (iiSES), which developed from the Green EMS Initiative, a multinational non-governmental organization dedicated to improving sustainability in EMS operations and workforce. He has field tested and published recommendations regarding use of hybrid vehicles in wilderness EMS response, which has been cited as the "future for a greener EMS".

He serves as the medical director of Landmark Learning, an outdoor education and wilderness EMS school in Cullowhee, North Carolina, as well as medical advisor for North Carolina Outward Bound School, REI, and the Student Conservation Association.

In 2013 he founded the Appalachian Mountain Rescue Team, the first fully credentialed Mountain Rescue Association team in the American southeast, and has served as that team's Chief and board chair. He is also co-founder and co-owner of Vertical Medicine Resources, a climbing medicine company.

In 2017 he and Kentucky-based paramedic David Fifer founded and currently host the RAW (Remote, Austere, Wilderness) Medicine Podcast. He has lectured extensively on wilderness medicine topics and published widely in the EMS, emergency, and wilderness medicine literature.

He is the executive editor of the Wilderness Medical Society's Wilderness Medicine Magazine, co-author of Vertical Aid: Essential Wilderness Medicine for Climbers, Trekkers, and Mountaineers (W. W. Norton & Company, 2017), and is editor of the textbook Wilderness EMS (Wolters Kluwer, 2018).

=== Emergency medicine ===
Hawkins has been a full-time clinical emergency physician since 2003. He was chair and medical director of the Grace Hospital Emergency Department from 2010 to 2011, and currently works clinically at Catawba Valley Medical Center. He has served on the emergency medicine faculty at the University of North Carolina at Chapel Hill School of Medicine and Western Carolina University, and currently is an associate professor of emergency medicine at Wake Forest University. He is a Fellow of the American Academy of Emergency Medicine, the American College of Emergency Physicians, the Academy of Emergency Medical Services, and is a diplomate of the American Board of Emergency Medicine, double boarded in both emergency medicine and EMS. He has also served as a medical officer on multiple United States National Disaster Medical System (NDMS) teams, including the NC-1 Disaster Medical Assistance Team based in Winston-Salem, North Carolina, the PA-1 DMAT based in Pittsburgh, Pennsylvania, and the NDMS Mobile Acute Care Strike Team.

== Awards and recognition ==
In 2008, Hawkins was named a "Hero of Emergency Medicine" by the American College of Emergency Physicians and "Yalie of the Week" by the Yale Alumni Magazine for his emergency medicine and wilderness EMS work.

In 2009 the Wilderness Medical Society presented Hawkins with the WMS-Ball Award, now known as the Ice Axe Award.

In 2013, Hawkins became the first physician ever named a Master Fellow (MFAWM) by the Academy of Wilderness Medicine.

In 2014 the Appalachian Center for Wilderness Medicine awarded him its Mountain Laurel Award, their lifetime achievement award.

In 2018 he received the Dave Carter Leadership Award from the NC Search & Rescue Advisory Council, the Innovation in Medical Education Award from the Society for Academic Emergency Medicine, and the Outstanding Contribution Award from the Mountain Rescue Association. In that year Hawkins also became the first physician ever named a Master Fellow (MFAEG) of the Adventurers and Explorers Guild, a third-party certifier of an international multidisciplinary professional community of explorers, adventurers, and expeditioners. Hawkins was also named one of the Top 10 EMS Innovators of 2018 by the Journal of EMS (JEMS) for the publication of the textbook Wilderness EMS, the first multiauthor academic textbook specifically designed for healthcare professionals providing systematic health care in wilderness settings.

In 2019 Hawkins received the Wilderness Medical Society Education Award and the Karl Rohnke Award from the Association for Experiential Education.

== Personal life ==
Hawkins lives in Morganton, North Carolina with his wife and three children in a unique solar home on the Catawba River below the Linville Gorge Wilderness.

== Selected publications ==
- Hawkins SC, ed. Emergency Medicine Narratives: An Emergency Medicine Humanities Collection. American College of Emergency Physicians, 2019.
- Hawkins SC, ed. Wilderness EMS. Philadelphia: Wolters Kluwer, 2018.
- Hawkins SC, Simon RB, Beissinger JP, Simon D. Vertical Aid: Essential Wilderness Medicine for Climbers, Trekkers, and Mountaineers. New York: The Countryman Press, 2017.
- Millin, Michael G.; Johnson, David E.; Schimelpfenig, Tod; Conover, Keith; Sholl, Matthew; Busko, Jonnathan; Alter, Rachael; Smith, Will; Symonds, Jennifer; Taillac, Peter; Hawkins, Seth C. (November 2, 2017). "Medical Oversight, Educational Core Content, and Proposed Scopes of Practice of Wilderness EMS Providers: A Joint Project Developed by Wilderness EMS Educators, Medical Directors, and Regulators Using a Delphi Approach". Prehospital Emergency Care. 21 (6): 673–681. doi:10.1080/10903127.2017.1335815. PMID 28657809. S2CID 38879391.
- Hawkins, Seth Collings; Sempsrott, Justin; Schmidt, Andrew (August 2017). "News: 'Drowning' in a Sea of Misinformation". Emergency Medicine News. 39 (8): 1, 39–40. doi:10.1097/01.EEM.0000522210.76452.e9.
- Hawkins SC. Environmental Emergencies. In Caroline’s Care in the Streets, 8e, Pollak A, Aehlert B, Elling B eds. Burlington: Jones & Bartlett Learning, 2017.
- Hawkins SC, Millin MG, Smith WR. Wilderness Emergency Medical Services. In Auerbach's Wilderness Medicine, 7e, Auerbach PS, ed. Philadelphia: Elsevier, 2017.
- Sempsrott J, Schmidt A, Hawkins SC, Cushing T. Submersion Injuries and Drowning. In Auerbach's Wilderness Medicine, 7e, Auerbach PS, ed. Philadelphia: Elsevier, 2017.
- Hawkins SC, Millin MG, Smith WR. Care in the Wilderness, in Emergency Medical Services: Clinical Practice and Systems Oversight, 2nd Edition, Vol 2: Medical Oversight of EMS, Cone DC, Brice JH, Delbridge T, Myers JB, eds. 2015: John Wiley & Sons, Ltd, Chichester, pp 377–391.
- Millin, Michael G.; Hawkins, Seth; Demond, Anthony; Stiller, Gregory; McGinnis, Henderson D.; Baker Rogers, Janna; Smith, William R. (June 2015). "Wilderness Emergency Medical Services Medical Director Course: Core Content Developed With Delphi Technique". Wilderness & Environmental Medicine. 26 (2): 256–260. doi:10.1016/j.wem.2014.07.012. PMID 25698182.
- Hawkins, Seth C.; Weil, Carl; Baty, Fred; Fitzpatrick, David; Rowell, Bryan (December 2013). "Retrieval of Additional Epinephrine From Auto-Injectors". Wilderness & Environmental Medicine. 24 (4): 434–444. doi:10.1016/j.wem.2013.03.025. PMID 24041621.
- Hawkins, Seth C. (June 2012). "The Relationship Between Ski Patrols and Emergency Medical Services Systems". Wilderness & Environmental Medicine. 23 (2): 106–111. doi:10.1016/j.wem.2012.03.008. PMID 22656654.
- Hawkins, SC (2012). "Wilderness EMS Medical Director Course". Wilderness Medicine. 29 (1): 24.
- Hawkins SC. “Principles of Trauma” in Outdoor Emergency Care 5e, McNamara EC, ed. Boston: Brady, 2011.
- Hawkins SC. “Wilderness EMS” in Paramedic Practice Today: Above and Beyond, Aehlert B, ed. St. Louis: Mosby-JEMS Elsevier, 2009.
- Hawkins, Seth C. (August 2009). "The Idea of Order in the Emergency Department". Annals of Emergency Medicine. 54 (2): 298. doi:10.1016/j.annemergmed.2008.09.038. PMID 19616727.
- Hawkins, Seth C. (July 2008). "The Green Machine: Development of a high-efficiency, low-pollution EMS response vehicle". Journal of Emergency Medical Services. 33 (7) as0197251008702584: 108–110. doi:10.1016/S0197-2510(08)70258-4. PMID 18602596.
- Hawkins, Seth C.; Smeeks, Frank; Hamel, John (February 2008). "Emergency Management of Chronic Pain and Drug-Seeking Behavior: An Alternate Perspective". The Journal of Emergency Medicine. 34 (2): 125–129. doi:10.1016/j.jemermed.2007.07.001. PMID 17997073.
- Hawkins, Seth C.; Shapiro, Alan H.; Sever, Adrianne E.; Delbridge, Theodore R.; Mosesso, Vincent N. (March 2007). "The role of law enforcement agencies in out-of-hospital emergency care". Resuscitation. 72 (3): 386–393. doi:10.1016/j.resuscitation.2006.07.021. PMID 17156910.
- Hawkins, Seth Collings (July 2004). "Emergency Medicine Narratives: A Systematic Discussion of Definition and Utility". Academic Emergency Medicine. 11 (7): 761–765. doi:10.1197/j.aem.2004.01.003. PMID 15231467.
