= Travel clinic =

Type of medical facility

Travel clinics are medical facilities that specialize in the practice of travel medicine. The field primarily focuses on providing preventive medical care, such as administering vaccinations against tropical diseases such as yellow fever and typhoid fever as well as prescribing medications to prevent malaria. Travel clinic patients, or clients as they are sometimes known, are largely international travelers embarking on trips abroad for purposes related to leisure, business, adoption and visiting friends and family.

Travel clinicians typically rely on guidance and recommendations from the United States Centers for Disease Control and Prevention, or CDC. Though, travel medicine practitioners also take into account a travelers medical history, itinerary, planned activities and other factors that may impact preventative recommendations. The COVID-19 pandemic also has significantly impacted this guidance based on airline and destination entry restrictions implemented to slow the transmission of the disease.

== Training & Certification ==
Many travel clinicians seek specialized training and receive certification from the International Society of Travel Medicine, or ISTM. Travel health nurses also utilize educational materials and other resources from the American Travel Health Nurses Association, or ATHNA.
