= Journal of Special Operations Medicine =

- Discipline: Military medicine
- Language: English
- Edited by: Scott Graverson

Publication details
- History: 2001–present
- Publisher: Breakaway Media (United States)
- Frequency: Quarterly

Standard abbreviations
- ISO 4: J. Spec. Oper. Med.

Indexing
- ISSN: 1553-9768
- LCCN: 2003230399
- OCLC no.: 52289129

Links
- Journal homepage

The Journal of Special Operations Medicine is the official journal of the Special Operations Medical Association. The journal provides peer-reviewed articles with a focus on unconventional and operational medicine, including tactical casualty care, and the practice of medicine in the remote and austere environment. It is considered a valuable resource bringing experts in various allied fields together.

== History ==
The journal was established in 2001 at the behest of the Command Surgeon's Office of the Special Operations Command US Military. Originally published by the United States Department of Defense, it passed to a private publisher in 2011.

The journal has a shared science program with the journal Wilderness & Environmental Medicine produced by the Wilderness Medical Society, resulting in shared article publications.

== Abstracting and indexing ==
The journal is abstracted and indexed in Index Medicus/MEDLINE/PubMed, Scopus and Embase.
