= Expedition medicine =

Field of medicine focusing on medical support to an expedition

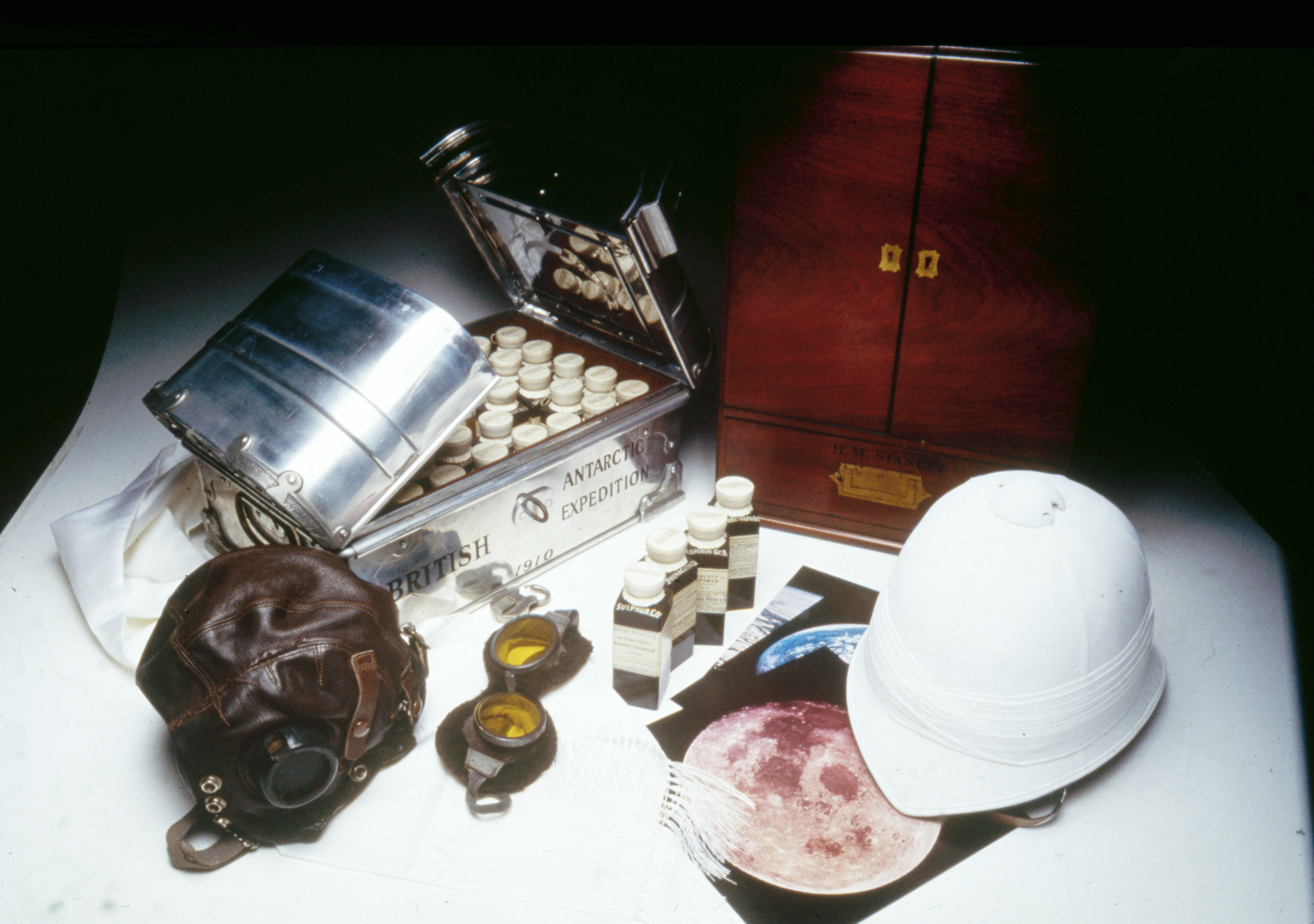
- Medical equipment used by Robert Falcon Scott on his 1910 Antarctic expedition
- Synonym: Expeditionary medicine
- System: Multidisciplinary
- Focus: Medical care, planning, and prevention in remote and resource-limited settings
- Subdivisions: Travel medicine; General environmental medicine; Battlefield medicine; High altitude medicine; Wilderness medicine; Diving medicine; Space medicine; Tropical medicine
- Significant diseases: Environmental Illnesses; Altitude sickness; Hypothermia; Frostbite; Heat illness; Trauma and Musculoskeletal Injuries; Trauma; Muscle strain; Sports injuries; Soft tissue injury; Infectious and General Medicine; Travelers' diarrhea; Respiratory tract infection; Wound and skin Infections; Tropical disease; Envenomation
- Significant tests: Field diagnostics, point-of-care ultrasound (POCUS), telemedicine triage
- Specialist: Expedition Medical Officer (EMO), Expedition Medic
- Glossary: Glossary of medicine

Expedition medicine (sometimes known as Expeditionary medicine) is a specialized field of medicine focused on providing comprehensive medical support, risk management, and preventive care to teams undertaking prolonged journeys in remote, austere, or extreme environments. While closely related to Wilderness medicine, expedition medicine is distinct in its emphasis on embedded, long-term team support, extensive pre-expedition logistical planning, and the public health management of a closed group.

Providers in this field support a wide variety of operations, including scientific research, commercial pursuits, non-governmental organizations, and military deployments. The role often requires meticulous preparation well before departure, encompassing pre-expedition medical screening, the assembly of specialized medical kits constrained by weight and volume, and the establishment of robust communication and evacuation protocols.

In the field, expedition medical providers frequently operate with severely limited supplies and diagnostic tools. This environment demands a high degree of clinical adaptability, improvisation, and cross-disciplinary collaboration with expedition leaders and logistics experts. Providers are responsible for managing acute trauma, environmentally specific illnesses, and the complex psychological stressors that arise from isolation and high-stakes teamwork.

== History ==
=== Ancient Era ===
This field of expedition medicine has ancient origins and has been practised almost since the advent of medicine and expeditions. Many ancient civilizations embedded medical staff with military units.

==== Babylonia ====
The conceptual origins of expedition medicine can be traced to ancient texts, like the ancient Babylonian Sakikkū (c. 1050 BCE), which documented the physical toll of expeditions and environmental hazards, like sunstroke (ṣēt šamši). Recognizing the danger of cross-regional contagion and exposure, ancient healers also utilized apotropaic quarantine rituals to avert the "evil foot" (šēp lemutti), in an effort to prevent returning travelers from introducing foreign diseases into their communities.

==== Ancient Egypt ====
In Ancient Egypt, non-military expeditions such as state-sponsored mining and quarrying were accompanied by dedicated medical practitioners to maintain the productivity of work expeditions. Evidence from logistical logs, such as those at Deir el-Medina, show that these physicians functioned as early expedition health officers. By managing trauma and environmental illness, and implementing regulated convalescence periods, they ensured the rapid recovery of skilled personnel and maximized the long-term operational efficiency of the expedition team.

==== Ancient Iran ====
In Ancient Iran, expedition medicine was characterized by a state-supported infrastructure that integrated healthcare into the logistics of imperial expansion and labor. The Persepolis Fortification Tablets provide evidence of a structured rationing system for medical personnel who accompanied expeditionary workforces to remote sites, functioning as early occupational health officers to ensure operational efficiency. Iranian medical tradition, as documented in the Vendidad, further supported these missions through specialized protocols for surgery and the use of antiseptic botanical resins, which were essential for managing battlefield trauma and environmental illness during long-distance campaigns. Much later in the 11th-century, Persian polymath Avicenna, who served as a medical advisor to Ala al-Dawla Muhammad on travels and expeditions, detailed specific regimens for safeguarding expedition members in both The Canon of Medicine and his "Treatise on the Regimen of Travelers" (Risala fi't-tadbir al-musafirin). Recognizing environmental vectors of contagious disease, he outlined structured protocols for pre-travel physical conditioning, climate adaptation, and strict water selection and purification techniques to prevent waterborne illnesses. Additionally, his early implementation of a forty-day isolation period (al-Arba'iniya) to halt the transmission of unseen pathogenic particles after expeditions laid a historical framework for modern quarantine protocols.

==== Ancient China ====
In Ancient China, expedition medicine was a critical component of statecraft used to maintain the efficiency of border garrisons and naval missions. Administrative records from the Han dynasty, such as the Juyuan Han Slips, document a structured system of medical reporting, wound management, and quarantine used to preserve the "human capital" of frontier teams. Much later, during the Ming dynasty naval Treasure voyages, Zheng He's maritime fleet maintained an unprecedented ratio of medical officers and utilized advanced dietary logistics, including the use of Vitamin C-rich sprouts and teas, to prevent nutritional deficiencies and ensure the operational endurance of the crew over multi-year expeditions.

=== Medieval Era ===
As maritime exploration and merchant shipping expanded during the later medieval era, the necessity of maintaining the health of crews on prolonged, isolated voyages became critically apparent. Consequently, barber surgeons and other medical staff were increasingly added to the crew complement.

Unlike university-trained physicians, barber-surgeons were highly valued for their practical, hands-on experience. They possessed the specific skills required for the harsh realities of seafaring, including battlefield trauma management, wound cauterization, tooth extraction, and emergency amputation.

Far from land and the oversight of traditional medical guilds, a ship's barber-surgeon operated with medical autonomy. They were solely responsible for managing the ship's medical chest, concocting herbal remedies, and treating rapid outbreaks of infectious diseases like dysentery that frequently plagued tightly packed crews. Because merchant and exploratory expeditions were highly cost-conscious, hiring a single, multi-skilled barber-surgeon was the most pragmatic way to safeguard the crew's physical fitness. By the late Middle Ages and the dawn of the Renaissance, maritime powers began to formalize this role, eventually establishing regulations that required both the surgeons and their medical chests to be officially inspected for quality before a vessel could set sail.

During the Islamic Golden Age, expedition medicine reached a high degree of organization through the development of mobile hospitals (bimaristan al-mahmul). These units, often transported by camel caravans, were staffed by specialists to ensure the health of both military units and Hajj pilgrims in remote environments. Scholarly works such as Ibn al-Jazzar's Zad al-Musafir (Provision for the Traveler) functioned as early manuals for expeditionary health, providing protocols for managing environmental illnesses, water purification, and trauma care to maximize the operational endurance of the group.

=== Age of Discovery ===
During the Age of Discovery, expedition medicine planning became more integral to explorers on land and sea. Many explorers traveled with surgeons as part of their crew. Christopher Columbus's crew was accompanied by barber surgeons, including Diego Álvarez Chanca. A Genoese barber-surgeon traveled with John Cabot on his 1497 voyage to the coast of North America. Three barber surgeons traveled with the Magellan expedition and one, Hernando de Bustamante, was part of the crew of 18 Castilians who returned on the Victoria, the first ship to successfully circumnavigate the world. The Francisco Hernández expedition (1570–1577) was one of the first expeditions led by a physician and the first European scientific expedition in the Americas. Hernández’s expedition would herald a new era of expedition medicine, used to support scientific efforts, during the Age of Enlightenment.

=== Modern Era ===
Expedition medicine became more formalized during the modern era, leveraging advancements in medicine, survival skills, and trauma care. As expeditions pushed into more hostile environments, including higher altitudes and the planet's freezing cold poles, the medical challenges became more specialized, focusing on prevention and treatment in more extreme conditions.

==== Maritime Expeditions in the Age of Enlightenment ====
During the Age of Enlightenment, maritime scientific exploration stimulated major advances in several disciplines, including medicine. As technical innovations made voyages safer and more efficient, maritime expeditions began to frequently include specialized "surgeon-naturalists" and physicians to monitor health and document natural history. A critical focus of expedition medicine during this era was the management and eradication of maritime diseases such as scurvy. For example, the successful anti-scorbutic remedies utilized by James Cook were subsequently adopted by other explorers, including the French expedition led by Lapérouse. While expedition medicine doctors still had to actively manage infectious diseases on board, such as dysentery, their growing medical expertise allowed crews to travel further and observe the world more extensively than ever before.

Friderich Martens (Late 17th Century): Friderich Martens advanced expedition medicine and Arctic science, serving as a feldsher aboard a 1671 expedition to Svalbard. His 1675 publication, "Spitzbergische oder Groenlandische Reise-Beschreibung", transcended standard maritime logs to become a definitive European reference work for over a century, influencing later explorers like Constantine Phipps and establishing the clinician's role as both a medical officer and naturalist on polar expeditions.

The Linnaean "apostles" (18th Century): The Swedish physician and botanist Carl Linnaeus dispatched several of his most talented university students, affectionately known as the "Linnaean apostles", on global expeditions to collect and document previously unknown flora, fauna, and minerals. Because many of these explorers were trained in medicine, their voyages inherently blended natural history with early examples of expedition medicine. Physicians like Göran Rothman, Anders Sparrman, and Carl Peter Thunberg traveled to far regions of the world in different expeditionary settings. By traversing novel and extreme environments to expand Europe's medical and biological taxonomy, these expedition medicine physicians helped establish a historical precedent for integrating rigorous medical observation with international field exploration.

James Cook Voyages (18th Century): James Cook’s three major voyages of exploration all included surgeons who were critical to the survival of the crew and, in many cases, also acted as the expedition's naturalists. William Anderson served as a surgeon on both the second voyage and third voyage. David Samwell, a Welsh surgeon, traveled with James Cook on his third and final voyage aboard the HMS Resolution.

==== Early Modern Era ====
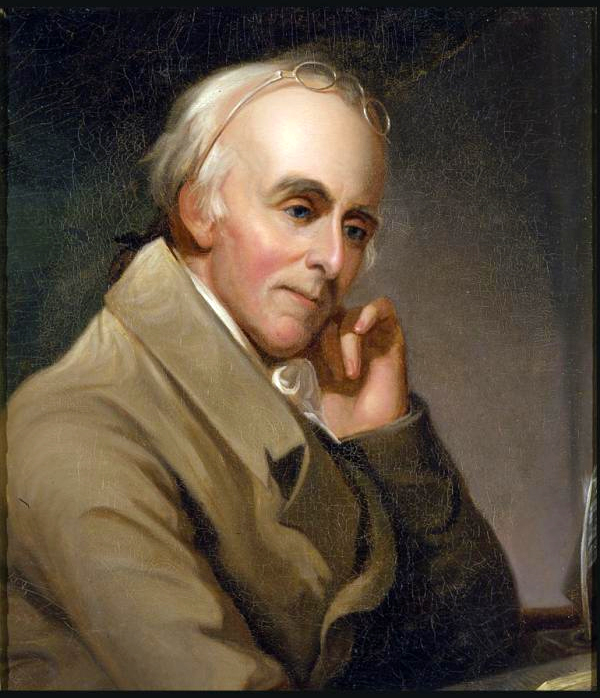
Benjamin Rush provided medical training and equipment to the Lewis and Clark Expedition

Lewis and Clark Expedition (1804-1806): Benjamin Rush furnished the Lewis and Clark Expedition with essential medical preparation by providing Meriwether Lewis rudimentary training in practices like bleeding and purging. Rush also supplied a portable medical chest containing necessary instruments and medicines, ensuring the expedition was medically prepared.

American Settlement (Early 19th Century): During the period of American settlement in the early 19th century, expeditionary medicine preparedness and support became standard concerns for wagon trains.

The Rise of First Aid (Late 19th Century): In the late 19th century, the influence of notable medical practitioners like Friedrich von Esmarch and members of the Venerable Order of Saint John pushing for every adult man and woman to be taught the basics of first aid. This movement eventually led to the institutionalization of first-aid courses and the standardization of first-aid kits, initially within the military and later in all medically austere environments, including expeditions.

==== Arctic Expeditions ====
The Jeannette Expedition (1879-1881): The ill-fated Jeannette Expedition into the Arctic Ocean included physician James Markham Ambler. Ambler demonstrated profound commitment to his role during the devastating sinking of the USS Jeannette and the subsequent 1,000-mile struggle across the Siberian ice. He was one of the last members of the final, desperate party to die of starvation and exhaustion, having attended to his remaining companions until the very end.

Robert Peary's Expeditions (Late 19th-Early 20th Century): Explorer and physician Frederick Cook served as the surgeon on Robert Peary's 1891-1892 Arctic expedition. Cook later joined the Belgian Antarctic Expedition, considered the first expedition of the Heroic Age of Antarctic Exploration. Cook also was a member on a controversial expedition to the summit of Denali and an expedition to the North Pole.

==== Antarctic Expeditions ====
During the Heroic Age of Antarctic Exploration, spanning from 1895 to 1922, at least eighteen expeditions ventured to the icy continent. These arduous journeys typically lasted between eighteen and thirty months, and the majority included one or two doctors within their ranks. Ernest Shackleton's expeditions, for instance, were consistently staffed with two surgeons.

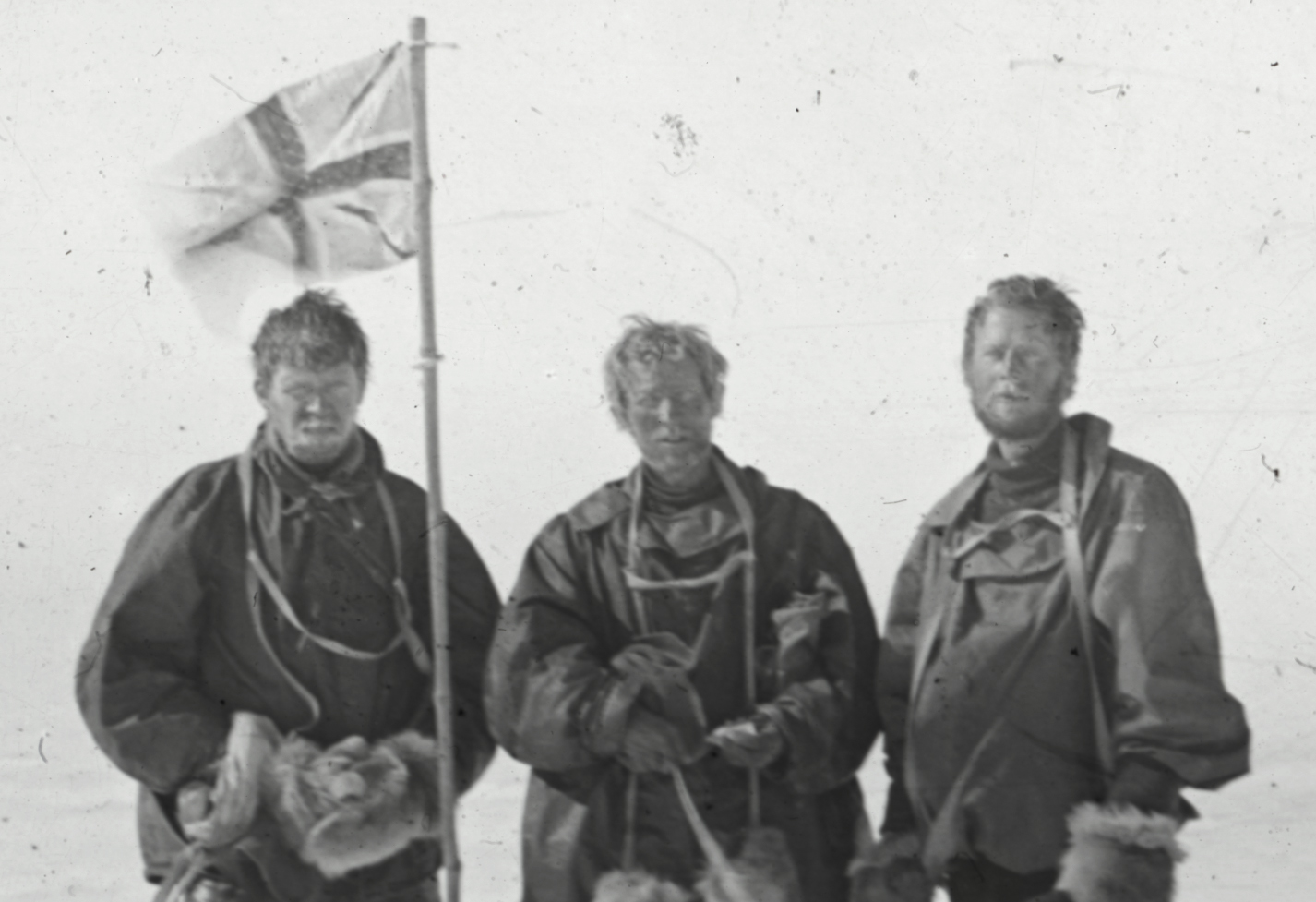
Dr. Mackay, Edgeworth David, and Douglas Mawson at the South Magnetic Pole on 16 January 1909

Notable Physicians:

- Alistair Forbes Mackay and Eric Marshall served as the surgeons on the British Antarctic Expedition of 1907–1909. Mackay was one of the three men (along with Douglas Mawson and Edgeworth David) who were the first to reach the South Magnetic Pole on 16 January 1909. Marshall was one of three men (along with Jameson Adams and Frank Wild) to reach the southernmost position during the expedition.
- Seizo Miisho was the expedition medicine physician and crew member of the Japanese Antarctic Expedition of 1910–12.
- Edward L. Atkinson and George Murray Levick served as surgeons on the Terra Nova Expedition (1910–1913) led by Robert Falcon Scott. After Scott's final party died, Atkinson took command and organized the long search for the bodies.

==== Arid and Overland Expeditions ====
Expeditions in arid and overland environments presented physiological challenges of extreme heat, water scarcity, and long-distance logistics across remote terrains. Hermann Beckler was the physician for the ill-fated Burke and Wills expedition (1860-1861), which crossed Australia over land from Melbourne in the south to the Gulf of Carpentaria in the north, a distance of around 3,250 kilometres (approximately 2,000 miles). Despite the expedition's ultimate tragedy, Beckler's presence underscored the necessity of a dedicated medical professional to navigate the unique biological and environmental stressors in this environment.

==== Tropical Expeditions ====
The field of expedition medicine also was adapted for the unique logistical hurdles and high tropical disease burden of equatorial environments. Between 1907 and 1925, Alexander Rice led seven major scientific expeditions into the Amazon Basin, where he integrated advanced medical preparation with emerging logistical tools. Rice was among the first to utilize shortwave radio for emergency communication and hydroplanes for both reconnaissance and rapid medical evacuation.

==== High-Altitude Expeditions ====
Michael Phelps Ward was the expedition doctor for the landmark 1953 first ascent of Mount Everest with Sir Edmund Hillary and Tenzing Norgay. Ward's studies on high-altitude acclimatization, oxygen use, and the effects of extreme cold were instrumental in the success of the climb and significantly advanced the understanding of high-altitude medicine.

== Scope ==
Modern expedition medicine ensures medical support in austere environments. This role requires proficiency in both preventive care and risk assessment to maintain overall team well-being. Meticulous planning is essential to prepare for medical emergencies and evacuations. Expedition medicine demands specialized knowledge to manage environmentally specific conditions and treat diseases relevant to the expedition location, adapting to the specific geographical and biological risks encountered. Also, an integration of non-medical skills into the medical role is often required if the medical provider is also a contributing team member of the expedition.

== Interdisciplinary Approach ==
The expedition medicine provider often needs to fill several roles, which requires an interdisciplinary approach to their role in the expedition. This interdisciplinary approach in expedition medicine shifts the paradigm from simply treating a sick or injured person to safely managing a team and the patient within an austere or hostile environment, requiring a fusion of medical, technical, logistical, and human-factor skills.

=== Comprehensive Risk Management and Prevention ===
The primary focus of expedition medicine is prevention — a task that requires expertise beyond traditional clinical medicine.

Logistics and Planning are important considerations. Collaboration with expedition leaders, logistics specialists, and field experts is vital for route planning, establishing evacuation plans, and sourcing reliable equipment. This includes developing a communication strategy, which is an essential non-medical technical skill.

Expedition medicine providers integrate knowledge from environmental physiology (e.g., thermal injuries, altitude sickness, water safety), tropical medicine, and public health to anticipate, screen for, and prevent environmental- and travel-related illnesses.

=== Clinical Care in Austere Conditions ===
When an emergency occurs, the expedition medicine provider often improvises and adapts.

Core clinical skills are usually combined with other skills, such as wilderness survival and search and rescue (SAR) techniques. For instance, treating a fracture requires medical knowledge, but evacuating the patient might require rope skills, technical rigging, and an understanding of terrain from a SAR perspective.

Expedition medicine providers frequently operate with severely limited supplies and diagnostic tools. Providers often employ an adaptive approach, utilizing field craft and engineering to improvise splints, shelters, and monitoring devices.

=== Team Performance and Psychological Wellbeing ===
Expeditions may be high-stress, prolonged endeavors where human factors are critical. Alterations to normal routines and the stresses associated with physical challenges can trigger pre-existing mental health conditions. Preventive measures include ensuring adequate social support, sufficient sleep, establishing travel-specific routines, adhering to medication regimens, and maintaining good awareness of early warning signs of mental health deterioration.

The expedition medicine provider often acts as a key team leader, requiring a deep understanding of team dynamics, crisis resource management, and the psychological impacts of isolation, stress, and injury. This draws heavily on disciplines like organizational psychology and team leadership.

Collaborating with physical fitness specialists or using knowledge from sports medicine is frequently necessary for pre-expedition screening and managing common musculoskeletal injuries, which are often the most frequent reasons for an expedition member to withdraw.

== Modern Advancements ==
Modern technological advances have significantly improved the feasibility and quality of medical care delivered in remote and austere environments. Innovations introduced to overcome the challenges of isolation and limited resources include the expanding use of telemedicine, miniaturized diagnostic equipment, and remote physiological monitoring.

The ability to use telemedicine and virtual consultation in austere locations has increased due to improved global satellite and cellular network coverage. Telemedicine capabilities allow expedition team members to consult in real-time with specialists worldwide, often using asynchronous or synchronous communication. Notable applications include real-time trauma triage, remote guidance for complex procedures, and tele-ultrasonography. Telemedicine helps to bridges the expertise gap, enabling expedition team members to perform more sophisticated diagnostics and treatment with specialist oversight.

Technological miniaturization has allowed diagnostic and therapeutic tools to become more lightweight, compact, and durable enough for field use. Portable medical systems, such as handheld ultrasound devices, provide rapid diagnostic capabilities. Furthermore, wearable technology allows for continuous, non-invasive monitoring of expedition team member vital signs, cardiac activity, and other physiological metrics, enabling the ability to track health status in real-time.

== See also ==
- Wilderness medicine – The practice of medicine in remote environments where definitive care is delayed or inaccessible.
- Battlefield medicine – The treatment of wounded personnel in or near a combat zone; it shares core principles with expedition medicine, such as operating in austere conditions, managing severe trauma with limited resources, and coordinating complex evacuation logistics.
- Aviation medicine – Medicine related to flight and aerospace, often relevant for aeromedical evacuations.
- Disaster medicine – The medical specialty focused on providing healthcare in disaster zones and resource-depleted environments.
- Global health – The health of populations in the global context, relevant for expeditions in developing nations.
- High-altitude medicine – The study and management of illnesses related to high altitudes, such as acute mountain sickness (AMS).
- Medical evacuation – The timely and efficient movement and en-route care provided by medical personnel to wounded or ill patients.
- Search and rescue – The search for and provision of aid to people who are in distress or imminent danger.
- Space medicine – The practice of medicine in space, representing the ultimate extreme of expeditionary closed-loop healthcare.
- Travel medicine – The branch of medicine that deals with the prevention and management of health problems of international travelers.
- Tropical medicine – The branch of medicine that deals with health problems that occur uniquely, are more widespread, or are more difficult to control in tropical and subtropical regions.
- Wilderness Medical Society – The primary professional organization dedicated to wilderness and expedition medicine.
