= Medical Committee for Human Rights =

American organization

The Medical Committee for Human Rights (MCHR) was a group of American health care professionals that initially organized in June 1964 to provide medical care for civil rights workers, community activists, and summer volunteers working in Mississippi during the "Freedom Summer" project. Tightly associated with the Civil Rights Movement, Martin Luther King Jr. notably addressed the 1966 MCHR convention. The organization remained active for years afterward in terms of fighting for disadvantaged Americans to have expanded access to health services, becoming a part of the "new left".

== Activities and history ==
Over a hundred health care professionals, doctors joined with nurses, psychologists, and social workers, spent a week or more participating in the "Freedom Summer" project. Though accustomed to at least some deference due to their profession and cause, they found themselves facing opposition from the same waves of bigotry that the civil rights workers themselves dealt with. Major governmental and non-governmental organizations did not approve of many of their methods. For example, the American Medical Association advocated an official policy up until the late 1960s in which it allowed affiliate state groups to be racially segregated, African-American physicians being denied hospital privileges and other things. On the other hand, many notable public figures advocated on the side of the MCHR; one of them, Paul Dudley White, had been President Dwight D. Eisenhower’s personal physician.

The founder was Walter Lear. Aaron O. Wells was the organization's first national chairman. Alvin Poussaint started as the Southern field director in 1965. Martin Luther King Jr. notably addressed the annual MCHR convention in 1966. He proclaimed, "Of all the forms of inequality, injustice in health care is the most shocking and inhumane."

== Decline ==
In the wake of the civil rights movement in the late 1960s, most de jure limitations on access to medicine had fallen, leaving MCHR in a period of flux leading to its declining effectiveness during the 1970s and 1980s. The MCHR's ultimate failure to push the U.S. government to adopt either a single-payer health care system or some other form of funding that subsidizes care for all Americans, regardless of the ability to pay, demoralized members. The group did not survive the Reagan administration.

== Legacy ==
The MCHR ended up functioning as a model for organizations that succeeded it, such as Physicians for Human Rights and Physicians for a National Health Program, while sharing both the MCHR's specific foundational goal (of improving healthcare access for individuals suffering from bigotry and prejudice) and larger goal (of advancing the general healthcare system to provide integrated services for all).

== See also ==
- Criticism of the American Medical Association
- Ann Hirschman
