= Remote Medical International =

Outdoor education organization

Remote Medical International (RMI) operates worldwide providing medical support services for companies and individuals operating in remote environments. RMI offers five main medical support services known as Core 5: RMI Staffing, RMI Topside Assistance, RMI Equipment & Supply, RMI Training, and RMI Consulting. The company serves clients in the energy sector, government and industrial services, military and law enforcement, executive protection, non-government organizations, and global logistics providers.

== History ==
Remote Medical International is headquartered in Seattle, Washington, USA with employees based all over the globe. The company was founded by Andrew Cull, a remote area paramedic in 2003. Inc. Magazine has named RMI three times as one of the 500 fastest growing companies in the US. In 2011, Remote Medical International was listed in the "Top Twenty Places to Work" in Seattle. RMI has approximately 100 employees, most of which are medical professionals.

In 2013, Remote Medical International received an $8 million investment from "Seattle-based Columbia Pacific Management, which already owns 23 hospitals in India, Malaysia, Vietnam and Indonesia through a related company, Columbia Asia." RMI partners with Columbia Asia and uses its hospital as a base of operations in Asia.

== Overview ==
=== RMI Staffing ===
Remote Medical International medical providers are available for onsite deployments operating in remote areas worldwide. Medical providers include experienced EMTs, paramedics, physician assistants, nurses, and doctors who respond to routine and emergent medical incidents. RMI medics are most commonly deployed on offshore seismic research vessels and land-based mineral exploration and production sites.

=== RMI Topside Assistance ===
In 2013, Remote Medical International launched RMI Topside Assistance, a global telemedicine service that operates out of the company's Global Coordination Center in Seattle. The service offers access to medical advice and logistical support 24/7 year-round via phone, internet, and video calls. The Global Coordination Center is staffed by Medical Coordination Specialists who connect clients to physicians for emergency consultation and advice and coordinate medical evacuations when necessary.

=== RMI Equipment & Supply ===
Remote Medical International is an authorized distributor of medical supplies and holds an export license for pharmaceuticals. RMI handles custom clearance of overseas narcotics including hazardous and cold-chain supply shipments worldwide. The company also operates an online store with remote medical equipment and healthcare supplies.

=== RMI Training ===
Remote Medical International provides remote medicine training courses taught by professionally trained and clinically active practitioners. RMI has trained over 13,000 students through public and private training courses including Wilderness First Aid, Wilderness First Responder, Remote Emergency Medical Technician, Remote Medicine for the Advanced Provider, and multiple recertification courses. RMI students include: all branches of the US military, energy companies, US intelligence agencies, law enforcement, FBI, executive protection, border patrol, special operations, national research organizations, National Park and Forest Services, universities, science foundations, guiding services, and individual adventurers.

=== RMI Consulting ===
Remote Medical International provides medical program consulting services for companies. Examples include Medical Emergency Response Plans, Local Health Facilities Reviews, Health and Safety Audits, Onsite Health Promotion Programs and Substance Misuse Testing Services.

== See also ==
- Wilderness Emergency Medical Technician
