= Stonehearth Open Learning Opportunities =

Coordinates: 43.97271°N 71.11726°W

Address
- 621 Tasker Hill Rd. Conway, NH 03818

Information
- Founded: 1976
- Website: www.soloschools.com

Stonehearth Open Learning Opportunities (SOLO) is the oldest continuously operating school of wilderness medicine in the world. SOLO is one of the originators of today's Wilderness First Responder (WFR) and Wilderness Emergency Medical Technician (WEMT) programs. In 2004 it provided first aid training to the cast and crew of PBS' Colonial House program, and a number of colleges and universities across the United States recognize its courses for credit. SOLO also trains advanced providers in disaster recovery medicine and extended remote care through its GEOMEDIC course.

== History ==
SOLO was founded in the early 1970s by Dr Frank Hubbell and Lee Frizzell in the White Mountains of New Hampshire. The pair developed what would become its Wilderness First Aid course in order to better prepare rescuers to respond to medical emergencies in remote areas an hour or more from definitive medical care. The organization built a campus on Tasker Hill, just south of Conway, New Hampshire in order to have a home base from which to teach its courses.

In the 1980s, SOLO created the Wilderness First Responder (WFR) and Wilderness Emergency Medical Technician (WEMT) courses. In addition to the Wilderness First Aid course, both of these courses have to become industry standards. In 1988, SOLO staff helped develop wilderness medicine clinical guidelines through the American Society for Testing and Materials (ASTM) Wilderness Medical Task Group. These guidelines were later adopted by the National Association of EMS Physicians.

As of 2015 SOLO has taught and certified over 300,000 students worldwide.

== TMC Books ==
TMC Books is an independent publishing company specializing in textbooks and support materials for SOLO along with an eclectic array of other topics, including climbing guides and educational titles. TMC Books produces the Wilderness Medicine Newsletter, an online resource for wilderness medical care providers. Its 2005 book, Treehouse Chronicles, went on to win five national book awards. These include a ForeWord Magazine Book of the Year Award, an Independent Publisher Book Award, a Writers Notes Book Award, an American Design Award, and a 2006 Hollywood Book Festival Award.
