= Ann Hirschman =

American nurse and street medic

- Born: 1946 or 1947 (age 78–79)
- Known for: Street medic training

Ann Hirschman is an American nurse practitioner and an elder of the street medic movement.

== Early life and career ==
Ann Hirschman was trained as a nurse, graduating in 1967. She became a member of the Medical Committee for Human Rights, where she joined a faction that expressed a moral obligation to assist the civil rights movement. In 1969, Hirschman happened upon a Greenwich Village political demonstration. When it turned violent, she began performing first aid with a kit she keeps on her at all times. Hirschman was present at the 1973 Wounded Knee Occupation, where she treated a man who had been shot in the head. She has been arrested more than ten times and never convicted.

Hirschman wrote an early street medic training program and trained activists to become medics. Her trainees were affiliated with Vietnam Veterans Against the War and the Black Panthers. She trained Ron "Doc" Rosen, who started the Colorado Street Medics, one of the oldest street medic organizations in the country.
