= Travel health nursing =

Nursing specialty

Travel health nursing is a nursing specialty which promotes the health and safety of national and international travelers. Similar to travel medicine, it is an interdisciplinary practice which draws from the knowledge bases of vaccines, epidemiology, tropical medicine, public health, and health education. Travel nursing has experienced an increase in global demand due to the evolution of travel medicine. Travel health nursing was recognized during the 1980s as an emerging occupation to meet the needs of the traveling public, and additional education and training was established. Travel health nurses typically work in "private practice, hospital outpatient units, universities, the government, and the military", and have more opportunities and leadership roles as travel has become more common. However, they also experience organizational and support-related conflicts with general practitioners and patients in healthcare settings.

== History ==
Travel medicine developed during the 1990s, and is evolving. It aims to prevent disease and illness during travel, and provides specialized care to risk-prone travelers. Travel medicine practiced in other healthcare settings, such as workplaces, college health clinics, emergency departments, pharmacies, and supermarkets. Standalone travel-medicine clinics also exist, using preventive healthcare to reduce morbidity and mortality. Travel health nursing is prevalent in the United States, and an international 1996 study confirmed that nurses play a significant role in providing health education to travelers.

However, travel health nurses demanded more training in order to provide better service. In 2004, when travel medicine was recognized as one of 91 sub-specialties, 97 percent of health advisers were nurses and 75 percent of nurses worked while receiving higher-level education and training.

== Profession ==
Travel health nurses primarily work in travel health clinics in the military, the government, and some large ambulatory care practices. Their work covers pre-travel care, focusing on disease prevention and health promotion while patients are away from home. Travel health nurses assess a traveler's health and destination risks to implement a plan of preventive care which may include immunizations and travel medications and supplies. These nurses offer health counseling and education for travelers about managing chronic conditions away from home. Referrals for care during travel are often provided for anticipated needs or a health emergency.

=== Roles ===
Health issues may accompany travel, and the need for nurses in travel health clinics has increased (particularly in the United States).

==== Pre-travel care ====
Pre-travel care includes an evaluation of health and safety hazards and a customized plan of care which may encompass immunizations, travel medications and supplies, self-care counseling, and referrals. A pre-travel assessment includes a travel health history over a six-month period:

- Demographics: age, gender, and country of birth
- Medications: prescription drugs, over-the counter-medicines, herbal medications
- Medical history: chronic health issues (such as heart disease or diabetes), pregnancy, surgeries, mental-health issues
- Allergies: vaccines, foods, medications, environmental triggers, anaphylaxis
- Immunization: documentation, vaccination dates, adverse reactions if any
- Travel illness: illness or injury, experience with healthcare in other countries, first-aid knowledge and experience using travel medications

After a health history is obtained, the nurse collects information about the trip:

- Destination: every destination, including stops
- Duration of travel: dates of departure and arrival, and how long an individual stayed at a particular destination
- Type of travel: urban or rural, work-related, backpacking, group, family holiday, or individual trip
- Transportation: type and accommodations (hotel, camping, or hostel)
- Type of activities planned: work or leisure, activities including water, contact with people and animals, and sexual activity

Pre-travel health care also includes trip planning: research and risk identification. Nurses identify the health risks of a particular trip on a specific traveler:

- Unstable medical conditions such as cardiovascular and respiratory issues, musculoskeletal problems, and mental-health issues
- Traveler age: Younger and older travelers are more prone to disease.
- Pregnancy: increases trip risk, particularly during the first and third trimesters
- Medication and drug use: Certain medications, such as diuretics, can increase risk. Alcohol use and illegal drugs threaten health and safety during travel.
- Destination: travel to remote, rural, and underdeveloped destinations, or to destinations lacking health and safety services
- Trip duration: Longer trips are riskier.
- Season: rainy and dry seasons present the risk of infectious diseases
- Overseas work assignments: occupational risks
- Contact with local individuals: Interaction with local residents, especially children, refugees and the sick, increases the risk of infectious disease.
- Leisure activities such as rafting, caving, mountain climbing, riding motorcycles, and scuba diving can increase the risk of trauma and accidental death

A pharmacological plan includes pharmacological and non-pharmacological measures which help reduce risk. The plan consists of precautions before, during, and after the trip to minimize risk to a traveler's health and safety. Vaccine recommendations consider a client's medical history (including immunizations), age, pregnancy, allergies, date of departure, and trip duration. Dose requirements minimize the risk of adverse effects.

The final phase focuses on health education and counseling, since most travel-health issues are not preventable by vaccines. Handouts, audiovisuals, and role play may be used, and topics include vehicle safety and air-travel hazards. Foreign road-safety laws and signs and drink driving may increase the risk of accidents and injuries. Air-travel hazards include jet lag, deep vein thrombosis, airborne illnesses, and exposure to air rage.

==== Post-travel care ====
Travelers returning from a trip with an injury or illness are evaluated in consultation with specialists in infectious disease, dermatology, trauma, and gastrointestinal disease.

== Scope ==
Travelers may be at risk for disease, depending on factors such as destination, season, and preventive measures; those with chronic illness or disability or who are pregnant are at greater risk. Jet lag, sleep disruption, and other sleep-related disorders may occur due to travel across time zones. Other travel-related illnesses, such as diarrhea, food poisoning and other vector-borne illnesses, may significantly impact those with pre-existing medical conditions. Travel health nurses have a role in hospitals, travel health clinics, occupational-health departments, and general medical practices. Educational programs for travel health nursing are expanding; in the United States, travel health programs consist of pre-travel services. Nurses may manage their own practices.

=== Prescribing medication ===
Although pharmacology is a significant component of travel health nursing, the vast majority of travel health nurses require additional certification to prescribe medicine. The ability to prescribe requires appropriate training and professional development: reliable, up-to-date and recognized sources; an understanding of the restrictions associated with prescriptions, patient group directions (PGDs) and patient-specific directions (PSDs), and the principles of risk assessment and their application to the traveler. Practitioners accept full responsibility in recommending, administering and prescribing vaccines and medicine.

== Occupational hazards ==
Travel health nurses face a number of challenges. Travel health nurses from the UK, Japan and Australia were asked about the difficulties they faced in their job. Most said that time was one of their most challenging difficulties. Time issues were appointment timing, allotted times with a traveler, and time to meet administrative requirements.

Another challenge faced by travel health nurses is a lack of educational opportunities. Accredited training programs are costly, and include travel expenses. Training and education take additional time. Practice nurses are expected to deliver care, but lack travel-health training. Problem patients are another occupational hazard. Some patients fail to understand poor consequences: the chronically ill, pregnant women, infants or the elderly. Lack of financial support from employers is also a barrier. Nurses usually have to work within a budget. Conflicts may occur between general practitioners and nurses about travel medicine, and laws may prohibit prescribing medicine or vaccinations.
