= RM1 =

RM1 or variant, may refer to:

- RM1, the postcode for a part of Romford, see RM postcode area
- RM1 (Recife Model 1), a quantum computational method of calculating molecular electronic structure, a variant of Austin Model 1
- Valmet RM 1, a class of two-bogie four-axle tram, see List of Valmet products
- RocketMotorOne (RM1), a Tier-1 rocket engine for SpaceShipOne
- RM1, a cancelled space station Russian Research Module
- RM1, a type of railcar in the NZR RM class

== See also ==
- RM (disambiguation)
- RMI (disambiguation)
- IRM (disambiguation)
- 1RM
