= Paul Auerbach =

American physician and author (1951–2021)

- Born: Paul Stuart Auerbach; January 4, 1951; Plainfield, New Jersey, U.S.
- Died: June 23, 2021 (aged 70); Los Altos, California, U.S.
- Occupation: Physician

Notes
- Notes above from the Dr. Auerbach's CV dated June 2009.

Paul Stuart Auerbach (January 4, 1951 – June 23, 2021) was an American physician and author in the academic discipline of wilderness medicine. He was the founder and past president of the Wilderness Medical Society.

== Early life and education ==
Auerbach was born in Plainfield, New Jersey. He graduated from North Plainfield High School in 1969. Auerbach then went to Duke University located in Durham, North Carolina, where he completed a B.A. in religion, graduating magna cum laude in 1973.

Auerbach received his M.D. from the Duke University School of Medicine in 1977. Auerbach then went on to Dartmouth Hitchcock Medical Center and completed his clinical internship in 1978 before starting a residency in emergency medicine at the University of California, Los Angeles Medical Center. Upon completion of his residency in 1980, Auerbach became board certified in emergency medicine by the American Board of Emergency Medicine in 1981.

Auerbach later went on to complete an M.S. in management as a Sloan Fellow at the Stanford Graduate School of Business.

== Career and life ==
From 1980 to 1981, Auerbach was an assistant professor of medicine at the Temple University School of Medicine in Philadelphia, Pennsylvania. He then went on to become assistant clinical professor of medicine at the University of California, San Francisco until 1985 when he moved to the Vanderbilt University School of Medicine in Nashville, Tennessee. Vanderbilt promoted Auerbach to professor in 1991 and later that year he moved to the Stanford University School of Medicine. Auerbach served as the chief of the division of emergency medicine at the Stanford University School of Medicine from 1991 to 1995. Auerbach served as the Redlich Family Professor of Surgery in the division of emergency medicine at Stanford School of Medicine, Stanford University.

Auerbach founded the Wilderness Medical Society February 15, 1983 with Ed Geehr and Ken Kizer. Their efforts helped bridge the gap between traditional medical practice and the unique challenges of providing care in remote and extreme environments. The organization's mission was defined as fostering scientific knowledge and education related to wilderness medicine, benefiting both its members and the general public.

Under Auerbach’s leadership, the Wilderness Medical Society quickly established a foundational framework to advance its goals. Early efforts focused on five key areas: administration, curriculum development—ultimately shaping the Fellowship in the Academy of Wilderness Medicine (FAWM)—conferences, and publications. Over time, these pillars evolved into six primary focus areas: membership, conferences, education, research, the Academy of Wilderness Medicine, and Adventure Education.

Auerbach and his colleagues prioritized excellence and credibility in all Wilderness Medical Society educational programs. In 1984, their commitment to high standards was recognized when the organization earned accreditation from the Accreditation Council for Continuing Medical Education (ACCME).

Auerbach was the editor for the Journal of Wilderness Medicine (currently Wilderness and Environmental Medicine) published by the Wilderness Medical Society from 1990 to 1995. Auerbach was also the author of a number of articles and books on topics such as emergency medicine, hazardous marine animals, and scuba diving, including two books of underwater photography. He died on June 23, 2021, from brain cancer at the age of 70.

== Awards ==
Awards received by Auerbach include:

- DAN America Award, Divers Alert Network (1998)
- Outstanding Contribution in Education Award, American College of Emergency Physicians (1999)
- NOGI Award for Science, the Academy of Underwater Arts and Sciences (2007)
- Founders Award, Wilderness Medical Society (2000)
- Hero of Emergency Medicine, American College of Emergency Physicians (2008)
- Diver of the Year, Beneath the Sea (2008)
- DAN/Rolex Diver of the Year, Divers Alert Network (2009)

== Editorships and publications ==
Auerbach was the editor for the Journal of Wilderness Medicine (currently Wilderness & Environmental Medicine) published by the Wilderness Medical Society from 1990 to 1995 when he became the Editor Emeritus. Editorial boards that he has served on included Topics in Emergency Medicine (1981–2006), The Journal of Emergency Medicine (1985–1986), Current Concepts in Wound Care. (1986–1988), Emergindex (1992–2002), Annals of Emergency Medicine (1988–1991), and European Journal of Emergency Medicine (1993–2006). He served on the editorial board for Emergency Medicine Reports (1986–20??). Auerbach was on the consulting editorial board for the Journal of Emergency Nursing from 1981 to 1985. He also served as the contributing medical editor for several diving publications including Dive Data (1987), Scuba Times (1988), The Undersea Journal (1988), and Dive Training (1991).

=== Books ===
- Diving the Rainbow Reefs: The Adventures of an Underwater Photographer. Darwin Pr. 1991. ISBN 0-87850-072-3.
- A Medical Guide to Hazardous Marine Life. Mosby-Year Book. 1991. ISBN 0-8016-6322-9.
- An Ocean of Colors. Darwin Pr. 1996. ISBN 0-87850-114-2.
- Bad Medicine. Specialized Publications Company. 1998. ISBN 0-9639960-7-X.
- Management Lessons from the E.R.: Prescriptions for Success in Your Business. Free Press. 2002. ISBN 0-7432-1635-0.
- Wilderness Medicine (6th ed.). Elsevier. 2012. ISBN 978-1-4377-1678-8.
- —; Donner, Howard J.; Weiss, Eric A. (2008). Field Guide to Wilderness Medicine. Elsevier. ISBN 978-1-4160-4698-1.
- Medicine for the Outdoors: The Essential Guide to Emergency Medical Procedures and First Aid (5th ed.). Elsevier. 2009. ISBN 978-0-323-06813-0.
- Lemery, Jay; Enviromedics: The Impact of Climate Change on Human Health. Rowman & Littlefield Publishers. 2017. ISBN 978-1442243187

=== Abstracts ===
- Auerbach, Paul; Yajko, D; Hadley, K; Kizer, K (1985). "Antibiotic sensitivity of bacteria isolated from the aquatic environment: Implications for clinical therapy (abstract)". Undersea Biomedical Research. 12 (1 Supplement).

=== Patents ===
- 1989 US 4801777 "A device for microwave rewarming of blood products"
