= Railcar Management LLC =

Provider of rail information services

- Formerly: RMI
- Industry: Transportation
- Founded: 1979; 47 years ago in Atlanta, Georgia, USA
- Successor: Wabtec
- Products: software as a service SaaS

Railcar Management Incorporated, a Wabtec company, is an independent provider of rail information services to the transportation industry. From 2012 through 2019, it was known as RMI.

== History ==
Founded in 1979 and located in Atlanta, Georgia, United States, RMI is a software as a service (SaaS) provider in the transportation industry. RMI processes approximately seven million carloads annually for railroads, rail shippers and railcar owners. RMI’s services are accessed via the Internet through RailConnect, a web-based portal to the company’s integrated suite of proprietary information services, which were developed to help manage rail operations, improve customer service and reduce costs. Services include transportation, revenue, equipment, shipper freight and fleet management services and related executive information systems.

In 2002, J. Peter Kleifgen became CEO, chairman, and director, replacing Wilds Pierce. In 2004, a round of equity investments, including executives of the company, totally about $1.8 million, was announced. In June, 2007, private equity firm The Carlyle Group acquired a majority stake in RMI. On February 8, 2008, RMI announced it acquired Optimization Alternatives, an Austin, Texas-based provider of intermodal rail software applications, known as OASIS, Autotrack, and Vantage. OASIS serves the logistical needs of intermodal ramps throughout North America. AutoTrack manages vehicle inventory maintenance.

On April 14, 2009 RMI, announced it acquired 10East, based in Jacksonville, Florida. Founded in 2002, 10East's software as a service known as RailDOCS supports the signal and communications infrastructure needs of railroads in North America. RailDOCS suite of applications provides railroads with tools to manage preventative maintenance, test and inspection, and configuration management for their signals. RailDOCS worked with the FRA to ensure compliance with industry standards and federal regulations for signal maintenance. On November 3, 2009 RMI, acquired ExpressYard from SSG Innovations, a Flint, Michigan-based provider of software applications that support the billing of railcar repairs for contract shops and railroads in North America. Since 2002, ExpressYard provided software as a service for contract repair shops and railroads to manage the billing for railcar repair work.

On January 3, 2012 GE Transportation announced the completion of its acquisition of RMI from the Carlyle Group. In 2019, it became part of Wabtec.
