= Rank mobility index =

In demographics, the rank mobility index (RMI) is a measure of a city's change in population rank among a group of cities.

Formally

$$RMI=\frac{R_1-R_2}{R_1+R_2},$$

where

- R_{1} = city's rank at time 1
- R_{2} = city's rank at time 2

A RMI value must be between −1 and 1. A RMI of 0 indicates no change.
