= Street medic =

Volunteer first aid worker

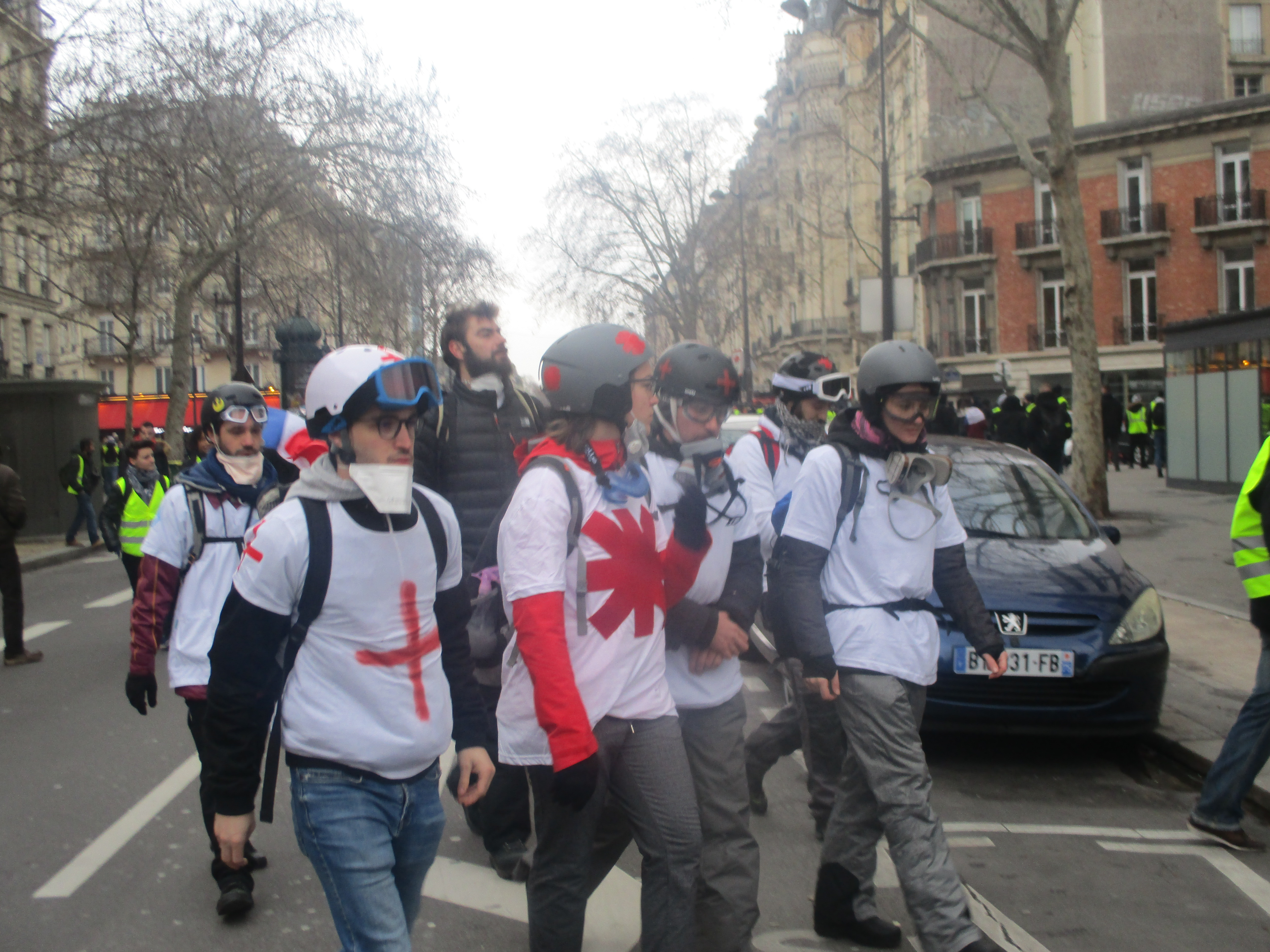
Street medics in Paris during the yellow vests protests in 2019.

Street medics, also called action medics or protest medics, are volunteers with a minimum of first aid medical training supplemented by specific protest-related training, who attend protests and demonstrations as support or mutual aid roles to provide medical and wellness care. Unlike emergency medical technicians (EMTs) or paramedics, who have undergone education for professional medical care, street medics usually operate under Good Samaritan clauses. Good Samaritan clauses are laws that offer legal protection for individuals who voluntarily give their assistance during medical emergencies that happen outside of normal circumstances (i.e. in a hospital). These laws aim to encourage people to help in urgent situations without fear of legal repercussions. They also use methods learned through specific protest-medicine training programs which individuals are required to undertake in order to be recognized as a trained street medic.

Street medics may treat trauma injuries, animal attacks, and ailments resulting from crowd control weapons such as chemical agents. They may also provide general care for general well-being, as well as for other critical health events such as heat stress, cold exposure, or seizures. Street medicine, often practiced at protests or in underserved areas, intersects deeply with issues of racial equity and justice. In particular, it highlights the disparities in access to healthcare for marginalized communities.

== History ==
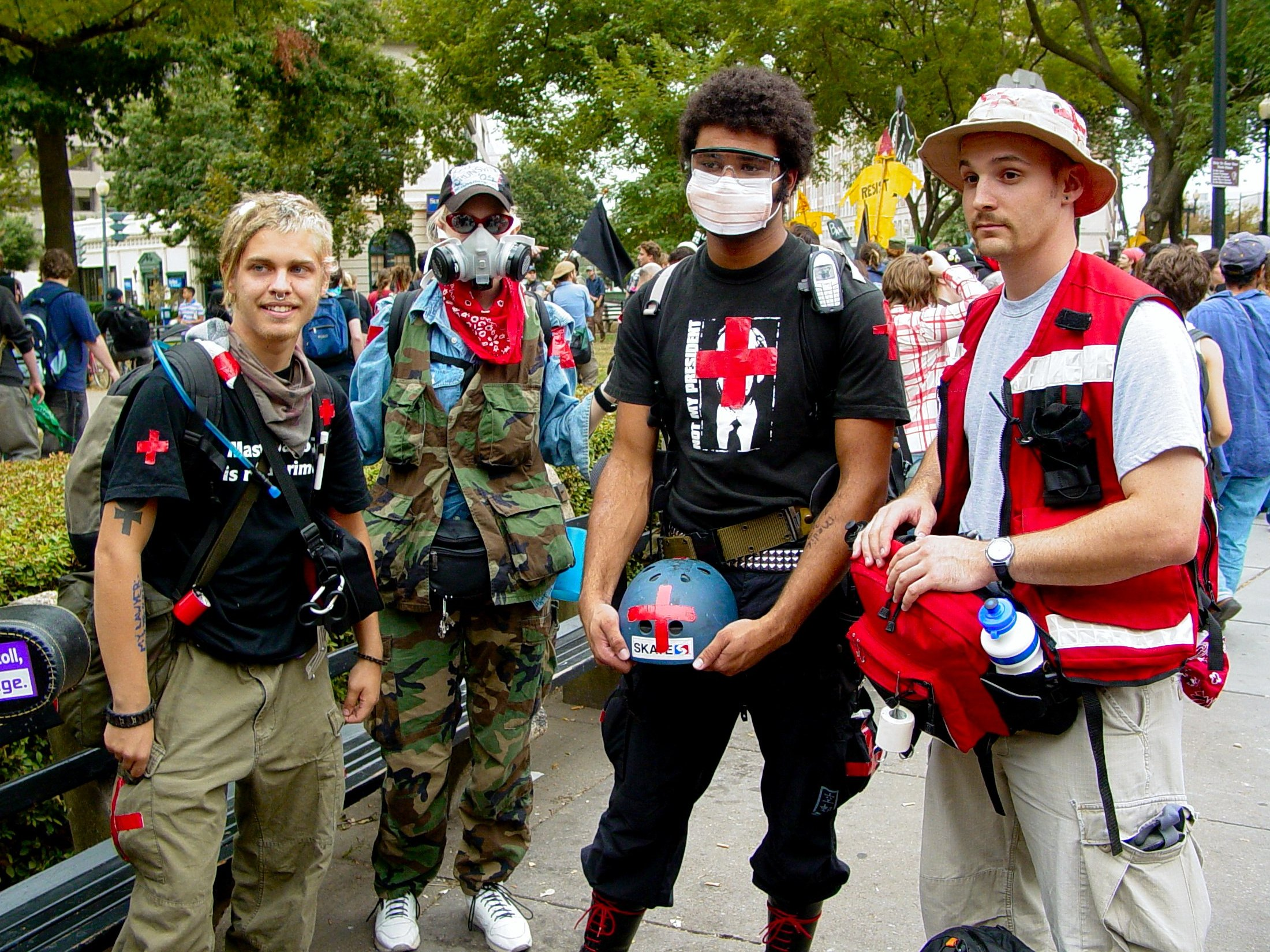
Street medics at Dupont Circle in Washington, D.C. for the September 24, 2005 anti-war protest.

Street medics originated in the U.S. during the Civil Rights Movement and anti-war movement in the 1960s. They conceived of medicine as self-defense, and provided medical support to the American Indian Movement (AIM), Vietnam Veterans Against the War (VVAW), Young Lords Party, Black Panther Party, and other revolutionary formations of the 1960s and 1970s. Street medics were also involved in free clinics developed by the groups they supported, notably through the Black Panther Party's People's Free Health Clinics. These clinics were set up to provide free healthcare to underserved Black communities, particularly where mainstream healthcare services were either inadequate or inaccessible. Much like today's street medics, the workers at these clinics were volunteers, driven by a commitment to justice and equity in healthcare. The work of these clinics laid the groundwork for the ongoing efforts of street medics to bridge caps in healthcare access. The street medic pepper spray removal protocol (MOfibA - Mineral Oil followed immediately by Alcohol) was later adopted by the U.S. military. Because the MOfibA protocol can cause severe damage to the patient if done incorrectly, it was largely replaced by the LAW (Liquid Antacid and Water) protocol.

A significant portion of street medicine patients are people of color, with a 2022 report from the California Healthcare Foundation revealing that half of their street medicine patients were from these communities.

== Interaction with law enforcement ==
Street medics sometimes experience difficulties with authorities in the United States

== See also ==
- Certified first responder
- Wilderness First Responder (WFR)
- St John Ambulance
- Battlefield medicine
- Ann Hirschman
