= List of wilderness medical emergencies =

The following is a list of symptoms and conditions that signal or constitute a possible wilderness medical emergency.

== Injury and illnesses ==
- Arthropod bites and stings
- Appendicitis (leading to peritonitis)
- Ballistic trauma (gunshot wound when hunting)
- Eye injuries (such as from branches)
- Flail chest associated with ice climbing and snowclimbing falls
- Hyperthermia (heat stroke or sunstroke)
  - Malignant hyperthermia
- Hypothermia
- Frostbite
- Poisoning
  - Food poisoning associated with warm weather expeditions
  - Venomous animal bite
  - Botanical from mushrooms or "wild greens""
- Severe burn (forest fire)
- Spreading wound infection
- Suspected spinal injury from falls, falling rock, ice
- Traumatic brain injury from falls, falling rock, ice

== Infections ==
- Lyme disease
- Malaria
- Necrotizing fasciitis
- Rabies
- Salmonella

== Neurologic ==
- Subdural hematoma, associated with rockfall, icefall, falls while climbing, glissade crashes with rocks, mountain bike crashes

== Respiratory ==
- Altitude sickness
- Asphyxia
- Drowning
- Smoke inhalation (related to Forest fire)
- Pneumothorax
- Pulmonary edema associated with high altitude (HAPE)
- Respiratory Arrest associated with neurotoxic bites

== Shock ==
- Anaphylaxis associated with stings
- Hypovolemic shock (due to hemorrhage) associated with climbing falls, kayak crashes, etc.
- Septic shock
