= Carolina Wilderness EMS Externship =

The Carolina Wilderness EMS Externship (CWEMSE) is an out-of-hospital medical training for 4th year medical students and resident physicians interested in furthering their educational interests in wilderness EMS.

== History ==
The Externship was founded by emergency and EMS physician Seth C. Hawkins in 2011, and co-founded by the Pilot Extern of that year, Dr. Ben Abo. Hawkins remains the course director and the course operates as a project of Hawk Ventures.

== Program ==
During one month each year, Hawk Ventures invites two Externs to Burke County, North Carolina to participate in an unusual collaboration of local medical resources—a community EMS system (Burke County Emergency Services), a community hospital system (Carolinas HealthCare System Blue Ridge-Morganton), a community college (Western Piedmont Community College), and an international research university (Wake Forest University‘s Department of Emergency Medicine). During this month the Externs operate as full members of the out-of-hospital medical team while learning the detailed workings of EMS medical direction, protocol management, and system response in the setting of rural, austere, and wilderness environments in Burke County. The county includes Linville Gorge Wilderness Area (the deepest gorge in the eastern United States, known as the “Grand Canyon of the East”), South Mountains State Park (the largest state park in North Carolina), and Lake James and its state park.

An atypical feature of this training program is that the physician trainees learn from field paramedics, which reverses the typical EMS model of physicians teaching and supervising EMS personnel. The Externs also establish a research project on an innovative topic related to wilderness EMS, formulate a lecture based on this research that is geared toward ALS and BLS crews within the county, and provide the lecture as part of in-service for the month of the Externship. This research has resulted in numerous contributions to the medical literature and medical education, including a description of the first case of interventional ultrasound use in a wilderness environment and development of the innovative “Safety Third” principle in emergency management. The Externs respond to EMS and wilderness EMS calls throughout the month and learn scene management, medical command, and other duties that an EMS physician may be responsible for providing when engaged in a wilderness EMS setting. This program's hands-on, experiential learning style in the field rather than the classroom, and the program's emphasis on field providers training physicians rather than the reverse, has been identified by Hawkins as "esse quam videri" learning. This approach has been cited in the wilderness medicine literature as an optimal way to acquire wilderness EMS and Search & Rescue (SAR) education, and the rotation has been cited as the "best month of medical school" by its students.

== Accolades ==
In 2018 Hawkins and the Externship received the Society for Academic Emergency Medicine’s “Innovation in Medical Education Award”.

In 2019 Hawkins and the Externship received the Karl Rohnke Creativity Award from the Association for Experiential Education.

== Faculty and staff ==
- Dr. Seth C. Hawkins - Course Director
- David Young - Paramedic
- Brenton Queen - Executive/Health Care Coach
