= Wilderness medical emergency =

Medical emergency in a remote geographic environment

A wilderness medical emergency is a medical emergency that takes place in a wilderness or remote setting affinitive care (hospital, clinic, etc.). Such an emergency can require specialized skills, treatment techniques, and knowledge in order to manage the patient for an extended period of time before and during evacuation.

== Types ==
=== Injury and illnesses ===
- Arthropod bites and stings
- Appendicitis (leading to peritonitis folkloric "what if" for long-distance sailing)
- Ballistic trauma (gunshot wound when hunting)
- Eye injuries (such as from branches)
- Flail chest associated with ice climbing and snowclimbing falls
- Hyperthermia (heat stroke or sunstroke)
  - Malignant hyperthermia
- Hypothermia
- Frostbite
- Poisoning
  - Food poisoning associated with warm weather expeditions
  - Venomous animal bite
  - Botanical from mushrooms or "wild greens""
- Severe burn (forest fire)
- Spreading wound infection
- Suspected spinal injury from falls, falling rock, ice
- Traumatic brain injury from falls, falling rock, ice

==== Infections ====
- Lyme disease infection
- Malaria infection associated with expeditions
- Necrotizing Fasciitis
- Rabies infection
- Salmonella poisoning associated with expeditions

=== Neurologic ===
- Subdural hematoma, associated with rockfall, icefall, falls while climbing, glissade crashes with rocks, mountain bike crashes

=== Respiratory ===
- Altitude sickness
- Asphyxia
- Drowning
- Smoke inhalation (related to Forest fire)
- Pneumothorax
- Pulmonary edema associated with high altitude (HAPE)
- Respiratory Arrest associated with neurotoxic bites

=== Shock ===
- Anaphylaxis associated with stings
- Hypovolemic shock (due to hemorrhage) associated with climbing falls, kayak crashes, etc.
- Electric shock

=== Mental health ===
Few programs teach psychological first aid, although mental distress is commonly encountered by wilderness guides and outdoor athletes. Alterations to normal routines and the stresses associated with travel and new physical challenges can trigger pre-existing mental health conditions. Preventive measures include ensuring adequate social support, sufficient sleep, establishing travel-specific routines, adhering to medication regimens, and maintaining good awareness of early warning signs of mental health deterioration.

== Mass-casualty incidents ==
A mass casualty incident is a situation in which the number or severity of casualties overwhelms the available medical resources and service providers. Mass casualties incidents in the wilderness may be due to blizzards, earthquakes, avalanches, landslides, floods and forest fire, but they need not be natural disasters. Mass casualties have also been caused by human error in parties of climbers or explorers, with or without complications from inclement weather. In mass casualty incidents, emergency service providers must prioritize their patients using a process called triage in order to make the most of their limited resources.

== Response ==
=== Extrication and evacuation ===
Transporting an injured person out of the wilderness on a stretcher can be a difficult exercise requiring considerable manpower. It is advised that at least one person stay with an injured party and that no one attempt to seek help by travelling alone over inhospitable terrain.

=== Golden hour ===
In emergency medicine, some advocates assert that there is a golden hour which refers to a time period lasting from a few minutes to several hours following traumatic injury being sustained by a casualty, during which there is the highest likelihood that prompt medical treatment will prevent death. While most medical professionals agree that delays in definitive care are undesirable, recent peer-reviewed literature casts doubt on the validity of the 'golden hour' as it appears to lack a scientific basis. Dr. Bryan Bledsoe, an outspoken critic of the golden hour and other EMS "myths" like critical incident stress management, has indicated that the peer-reviewed medical literature does not demonstrate any "magical time" for saving critical patients.

== Responder certifications ==
=== First aid ===
Wilderness first aid (WFA) is the specific discipline of first aid which relates to care in remote areas, where emergency medical services will be difficult to obtain or will take a long time to arrive.

Locating the victim precedes assessment and intervention and in the case of wilderness response is often a difficult matter. Specialists in white water rescue, mountain rescue, mine disaster response and other fields are often employed. In some cases, emergency extrication procedures at incidents such as automobile accidents are required before assessment is possible. Only once the location of the victim has been determined, a trained responder has been dispatched and successfully reached the victim, can the ordinary first aid process begin. Assessment is then enabled and it follows carefully specified protocols which have been refined through a long process of evaluation.

==== Certification ====
Wilderness First Aid is a relatively new field compared to regular or 'urban' first aid. For this reason, there are a number of boards and societies which have been formed in recent years to attempt to establish normalized standards for wilderness first aid certification and wilderness medicine in general. Currently, there are no national standards for wilderness medicine, however one of the most popularly followed curricula is the "National Practice Guidelines for Wilderness Emergency Care" published by the Wilderness Medical Society in 2010.

The American Red Cross Wilderness & Remote First Aid (r.2010) certification is valid for 2 years.

In Canada the first WFA courses were taught in the mid-1980s and the first organization to adopt standards was the Wilderness First Aid and Safety Association of BC (defunct since 1998).

In the Republic of Ireland and the United Kingdom various Wilderness First Aid courses and certifications are facilitated by WEMSI International who have bench marked their standards from the US based WEMS

=== First responders ===
A Wilderness First Responder (72- to 80-hour course) certification is both a higher certification than a Wilderness First Aid or (16- to 20-hour course) certification, and may also be used to upgrade an Emergency Medical Technician to a Wilderness Emergency Medical Technician. Outdoor Emergency Care is a National Ski Patrol certification, but it doesn't fully meet the requirements for a WFR certification.

== Training and certification organizations ==
A number of fellowships are available for emergency medicine graduates including prehospital medicine (emergency medical services), hospice and palliative care, research, undersea and hyperbaric medicine, sports medicine, ultrasound, pediatric emergency medicine, disaster medicine, wilderness medicine, toxicology, and Critical Care Medicine.

== See also ==
- Certified first responder
- Emergency medical services (EMS)
- First aid
- List of medical emergencies
- List of wilderness medical emergencies
- Medic
- Medical emergency
- National Ski Patrol (NSP)
- Oxygen first aid
- Paramedic
- Ski patrol
- Street medic
- Triage
- Wilderness Emergency Medical Technician (W-EMT)
