= Wilderness first responder =

Paramedic to remote regions

Wilderness first responders are individuals who are trained to respond to emergency situations in remote locations. They are part of a wide variety of wilderness medical providers who deal with medical emergencies that occur in wilderness settings. While wilderness first responder can generically refer to anyone providing first response, this term typically refers to individuals trained and certified with specific Wilderness First Responder (WFR) certification.

== History ==
Near the end of the 19th century, volunteer organizations such as St. John Ambulance began teaching the principles of first aid at mining sites and near large railway centers. By the dawn of the 20th century, additional organizations such as the Boy Scouts and the American Red Cross began teaching first aid to lay people. Over the years, these organizations trained hundreds of thousands of people in the elements of providing assistance until definitive care could be arranged.

The training in these courses assumed that definitive care was nearby and could be delivered quickly. Eventually it was realized that this training, while valuable, needed to be supplemented and/or revised to deal with the extended time and limited resources inherent when a medical crisis occurs in a wilderness setting. AN extended time in the context of wilderness medicine means the patient is over one hour from definitive care. In the 1950s, organizations such as The Mountaineers began developing training programs that addressed these special needs.

In 1966, the US Government, through the National Traffic and Motor Vehicle Safety Act, gave the Department of Transportation (DOT) responsibility for creating a national Emergency Management System (EMS). From this program came the standardized curriculum for the position of emergency medical technician (EMT) and later First Responder, which in the 21st century as described below became emergency medical responder.

The first formal wilderness medical responder class beyond first aid was taught by Carl Weil of Wilderness Medicine Outfitters, a variant of Advanced Wilderness First Aid for ski patrollers at Colorado State University in 1967. From this beginning a number of courses for wilderness responders beyond first aid appeared, including Wilderness Emergency Medical Technician, Advanced Wilderness First Aid, Wilderness Advanced First Aid, and others. Notable early schools and programs teaching such programming included Stonehearth Open Learning Opportunities, Wilderness Medicine Outfitters, and Outward Bound (Outward Bound courses were often run with Peter Goth, who went on to found Wilderness Medical Associates).

The first of these classes to specifically grant Wilderness First Responder certification was taught in 1985 by Frank Hubbell of SOLO and Peter Goth of Wilderness Medical Associates in the Florida S.T.E.P. (Short Term Elective Program) basecamp of Hurricane Island Outward Bound School. The purpose of creating the course was to provide rangers, outdoor leaders, and guides the necessary knowledge to provide care in crises in the wilderness.

Today, WFR certification is frequently a prerequisite for professional positions that involve work in the outdoors and students may take courses from numerous nationally recognized providers (see below).

In the mid-2000s, the Department of Transportation (which oversees EMS nomenclature and operations) mandated a national name change removing the formal "First Responder" certification and replacing it with "Emergency Medical Responder". With this action, a new category of Wilderness Emergency Medical Responder (WEMR) was born, and the differentiation between the wilderness medicine certification of WFR (primarily for guides, outdoorspeople, and others not formally involved in a response system, and unregulated) and the wilderness EMS certification of WEMR (primarily for formal responders to wilderness emergencies in a regulated system) began.

== Description ==
A wilderness first responder is trained to deal with many situations that may be encountered in the wilderness. The training is principally geared towards lay providers, with little to no actual medical experience, though they are often already professionals in other aspects of the outdoors industry, like park rangers, climbing instructors, and guides. A standard Department of Transportation defined emergency medical responder (EMR) course, which focuses on urban medical emergencies, requires approximately 60 hours of training, while its backcountry counterpart, wilderness first responder course, typically involves 80 hours of training, covering much of what is taught in an EMR course, but with the additional hours spent putting it in a wilderness context. Wilderness first responder training courses focus on teaching the students to assess a situation, improvise solutions using available resources to stabilize the patient, and identify the best way to get the patient to definitive medical treatment. In many courses, students are encouraged to develop the habit of systematically thinking through and documenting their assessment decisions/plans using a SOAP note. Topics covered usually include, but are not limited to, the following principles:

- basic life support
- responding to results of physical trauma:
  - management of signs and symptoms of circulatory shock
  - management of soft tissue injury such as a burn or wound
    - prevention and/or treatment of blood-borne pathogens
    - treatment of infectious diseases
  - management of bone and joint injuries such as fractures, sprains, strains and dislocations
  - management of suspected head and or spinal injury
- responding to the onset of sudden illness
- transport/evacuation planning and implementation.

== Standards and Regulation ==
WFR is an unregulated certification. With the abandonment by the Department of Transportation of the First Responder nomenclature in the 21st century, it now also has no linkage to EMS operations or certifications. In 1999 the Wilderness Medical Society published minimum topics for courses claiming to grant WFR certification. In 2016, the Wilderness Medicine Education Consortium, an industry-led collaborative from multiple wilderness medicine schools, published a recommended scope of practice for WFRs.

The EMR portion of WEMR is regulated by state rules and law, and by federal EMS recommendations and policies. The wilderness portion of WEMR is unregulated, and presumably would follow WFR standards.

== WFR designation ==
Wilderness first responder is abbreviated as WFR. Those with the certification are often called "Woofers". The 21st century EMS equivalent of Wilderness Emergency Medical Responder is abbreviated as WEMR and those with the certificate are usually described as "Wemmers".

== See also ==
- Certified first responder
- Outdoor emergency care
- Street medic
