= Wilderness & Environmental Medicine =

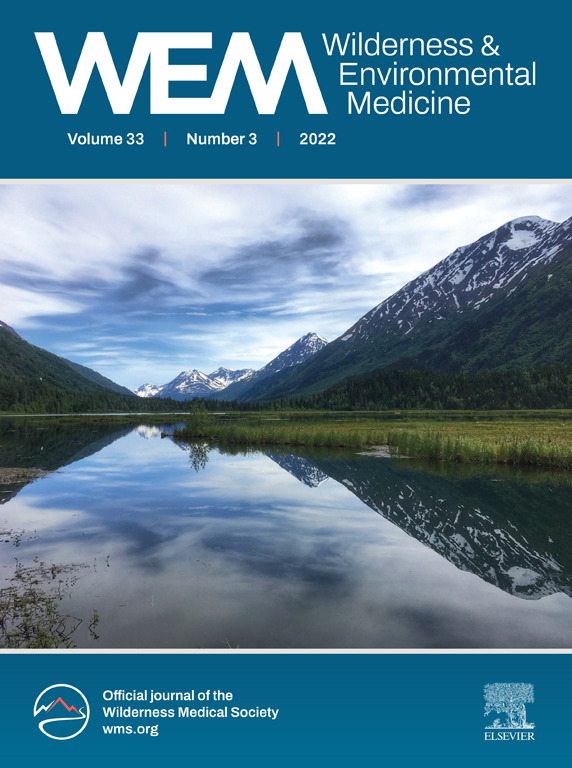
- Discipline: Wilderness medicine, environmental medicine, toxicology, sports medicine
- Language: English
- Edited by: William D. Binder

Publication details
- Former name(s): Journal of Wilderness Medicine
- History: 1995-present
- Publisher: Sage Publishing
- Frequency: Quarterly
- Open access: Hybrid
- Impact factor: 1.4 (2023)

Standard abbreviations
- ISO 4: Wilderness Environ. Med.

Indexing
- ISSN: 1080-6032 (print); 1545-1534 (web)
- LCCN: 95660051
- OCLC no.: 269277974

Links
- Journal homepage; Online access; Online archive

Wilderness & Environmental Medicine is a quarterly peer-reviewed medical journal covering wilderness medicine. It is the official journal of the Wilderness Medical Society and published its Wilderness Medical Society Clinical Practice Guidelines. The journal is published by Sage Publishing and the editor-in-chief is William D. Binder.

== Podcast ==
The journal also produces the Wilderness Medicine Podcast. The podcast has linked continuing medical education credits available through the Wilderness Medical Society website.

== Editors-in-chief ==
The following persons are or have been editor-in-chief:

- William D. Binder (2022–present)
- Neal W. Pollock (2016-2022)
- Scott E.McIntosh (2010-2015)
- Robert L. Norris (2000-2010)
- William A. Robinson (1995-2000)
- Oswald Oelz (1990-2000)
- Paul S. Auerbach (1990-1994)

== Abstracting and indexing ==
The journal is abstracted and indexed in:

- Biological Abstracts
- BIOSIS Previews
- CAB Abstracts
- CINAHL
- EBSCO databases
- Embase
- Index medicus/[MEDLINE]/PubMed
- Science Citation Index Expanded
- Scopus
- The Zoological Record

According to the Journal Citation Reports, the journal has a 2023 impact factor of 1.4.
