= Travel medicine =

Branch of medicine

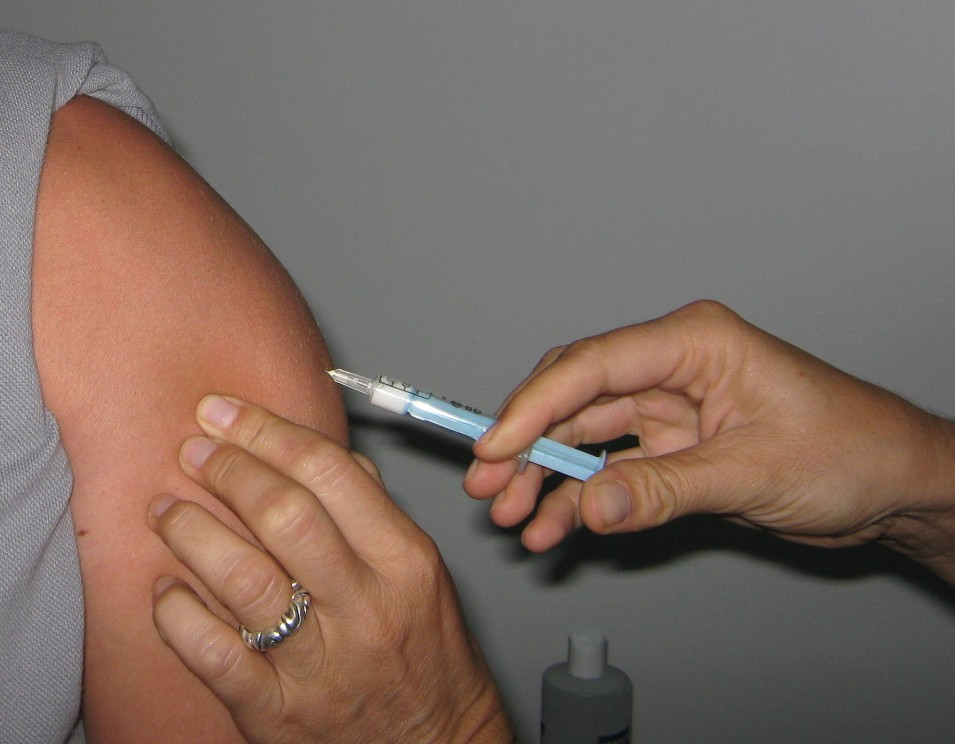

Travel medicine or emporiatrics is the branch of medicine that deals with the prevention and management of health problems of international travelers.

== Globalization and travel ==
Globalization facilitates the spread of disease and increases the number of travelers who will be exposed to a different health environment. Major content areas of travel medicine include the global epidemiology of health risks to the traveler, vaccinology, malaria prevention, and pre-travel counseling designed to maintain the health of the approximately 600 million international travelers. It has been estimated that about 80 million travelers go annually from developed to developing countries.

== Mortality and morbidity ==
Mortality studies indicate that cardiovascular disease accounts for most deaths during travel (50–70%), while injury and accident follow (~25%). Infectious disease accounts for about 2.8–4% of deaths during/from travel. Morbidity studies suggest that about half of people from a developed country who stay one month in a developing country will get sick. Traveler's diarrhea is the most common problem encountered.

== Disciplines ==
The field of travel medicine encompasses a wide variety of disciplines including epidemiology, infectious disease, public health, tropical medicine, high altitude physiology, travel related obstetrics, psychiatry, occupational medicine, military and migration medicine, and environmental health.

Special itineraries and activities include cruise ship travel, diving, mass gatherings (e.g. the Hajj), and wilderness/remote regions travel.

Travel medicine can primarily be divided into four main topics: prevention (vaccination and travel advice), assistance (dealing with repatriation and medical treatment of travelers), wilderness medicine (e.g. high-altitude medicine, cruise ship medicine, expedition medicine, etc.) and access to health care, provided by travel insurance.

== Focus ==
Travel medicine includes pre-travel consultation and evaluation, contingency planning during travel, and post-travel follow-up and care. Information is provided by the WHO that addresses health issues for travelers for each country as well as the specific health risks of air travel itself. Also, the CDC publishes valuable and up-to-date information. Key areas to consider are vaccination and the seven I's:

1. Insects: repellents, mosquito nets, antimalarial medication
2. Ingestions: safety of drinking water, food
3. Indiscretion: HIV, sexually transmitted disease
4. Injuries: accident avoidance, personal safety, safety around animals
5. Immersion: schistosomiasis
6. Immunization (pre-travel vaccination)
7. Insurance: coverage and services during travel, access to health care

== Specific disease problems ==
Yellow fever is endemic to certain areas in Africa and South America. The CDC site delineates the risk areas and provides information about vaccination and preventive steps.

Meningococcal meningitis is endemic in the tropical meningococcal belt of Africa. Vaccination is required for pilgrims going to Mecca. Detailed information is available on the CDC site.

Malaria prevention consists of preventing or reducing exposure to mosquitoes by using screened rooms, air-conditioning, and nets, and use of repellents (usually DEET). In addition, chemoprophylaxis is started before travel, during the time of potential exposure, and for four weeks (chloroquine, doxycycline, or mefloquine) or seven days (atovaquone/proguanil or primaquine) after leaving the risk area.

== Medication kit ==
The traveler should have a medication kit to provide for necessary and useful medication. Based on circumstances, it should also include malaria prophylaxis, condoms, and medication to combat traveler's diarrhea. In addition, a basic first aid kit can be of use.

Studies have shown there are four main medical problems that travellers develop—diarrhoea or gut problems, respiratory problems, wounds and pain. The medical kit should at least address these common things.

Research has also shown that the best treatment for travellers diarrhoea is to take an antibiotic (e.g. ciprofloxacin) plus a stopper (e.g. loperamide). Due to bacterial resistance, different parts of the world require different antibiotics. It is best to consult a travel doctor to sort out the best medical kit for the exact destination and medical history of the person travelling.

== See also ==
- Air travel
- American Society of Tropical Medicine and Hygiene
- International Certificate of Vaccination or Prophylaxis
- Global Infectious Disease Epidemiology Network (GIDEON)
- Health hazards of air travel
- Institute of Tropical Medicine Antwerp
- International health
- Jet lag
- Royal Society of Tropical Medicine and Hygiene
- Tropical disease
- Walter Reed Tropical Medicine Course – Silver Spring, Maryland, US
- Wilderness acquired diarrhea
- Expedition medicine
