= Wilderness emergency medical technician =

A wilderness emergency medical technician (WEMT) is an emergency medical technician who receives training targeted at providing stabilizing care in wilderness environments and assessing, treating, and protecting patients in remote and austere environments until definitive medical care is reached. Despite the term, wilderness emergency medical technician training is available to not only emergency medical technicians, but also paramedics, prehospital registered nurses, registered nurses, physician assistants, and medical doctors. WEMT training and certification is similar in scope to wilderness advanced life support (WALS) or other courses for advanced providers such as AWLS (advanced wilderness life support), WUMP (wilderness upgrade for medical professionals), WMPP (wilderness medicine for professional practitioner), and RMAP (remote medicine for advanced providers). Unlike more conventional emergency medicine training, wilderness emergency medicine places a greater emphasis on long-term patient care in the backcountry where conventional hospital care can be hours or days away.

== History ==
Near the end of the 19th century, volunteer organizations such as St. John Ambulance began teaching the principles of first aid at mining sites and near large railway centers. By the dawn of the 20th century, additional organizations such as the Boy Scouts and the American Red Cross began teaching first aid to lay people. Over the years, these organizations trained hundreds of thousands of people in the elements of providing assistance until definitive care could be arranged. The training in these courses assumed that definitive care was nearby and could be delivered quickly. Eventually there was a realization that this training, while valuable, needed to be supplemented and/or revised to deal with the extended time and limited resources inherent when a medical crisis occurs in a wilderness setting. In the 1950s organizations such as The Mountaineers began developing training programs that addressed these special needs. In 1966, the US Government, through the National Traffic and Motor Vehicle Safety Act, gave the Department of Transportation (DOT) responsibility for creating a national Emergency Medical Services System (EMS). From this program came the standardized curriculum for the position of emergency medical technician (EMT). The first wilderness EMT course was taught in 1976 to help EMTs in Colorado adapt their skills and knowledge when working with search and rescue teams. By 1977 organizations such as Stonehearth Open Learning Opportunities (SOLO) were offering specialized wilderness first aid training to their instructors. Meanwhile the DOT EMS program recognized a need to develop standardized training for "first responders" such as truck drivers, policemen and fireman who could lend assistance during the initial part of "golden period" until an ambulance with an EMT arrived.

== Training ==
WEMT training is not standardized and varies by state and school but typically involves around 50 hours of wilderness medicine training in addition to the traditional EMT training. Most schools also allow for other health care professionals, such as RNs, MDs, or Paramedics, to become wilderness certified, but the curriculum is the same, the standard of care and scope of practice may vary. Often a student will have to travel a long distance to attend a WEMT class, and as a result, most WEMT classes involve taking classes 8–10 hours per day for one or more weeks (depending on whether the student is already an EMT).

There is a strong focus on rendering aid with improvised means (for instance, using a branch and some rope to splint an injured extremity rather than using commercially available splinting devices). In wilderness settings it is unlikely that the specialized equipment found in an ambulance will be available, so the focus is on using only what is at hand in your assessment and care for a patient. There is also a greater focus on long-term care, since a WEMT may have to be with a patient for many hours, while most urban EMTs are with each patient for no more than an hour at the most.

Providing care in the wild can be a daunting task, since the golden hour is usually out of the question, and one may have to treat or stabilize a critical patient for hours until help arrives or you can get them the care they need. Backcountry medicine often speaks of the golden day—a patient's survival chances for critical injuries drastically drop off around 24 hours without hospital care.

WEMT's and wilderness first responder can perform more advanced interventions, such as giving patients prescribed medications outside the scope of an urban EMT or first responder with off-line medical direction. Some of these medications include those for pain, fever and infections depending on what standing orders the WEMT or WFR has.

WEMTs also are allowed some acts outside the scope of practice of urban EMTs, such as stopping CPR after all efforts have been exhausted, dislocation reductions and ruling out spinal injuries. Wilderness EMT courses are available in Ireland and the United Kingdom but are not recognised by the respective governing bodies for pre-hospital care.

== See also ==
- Rural health
