= Wilderness medicine =

Medical care in remote geographic environments

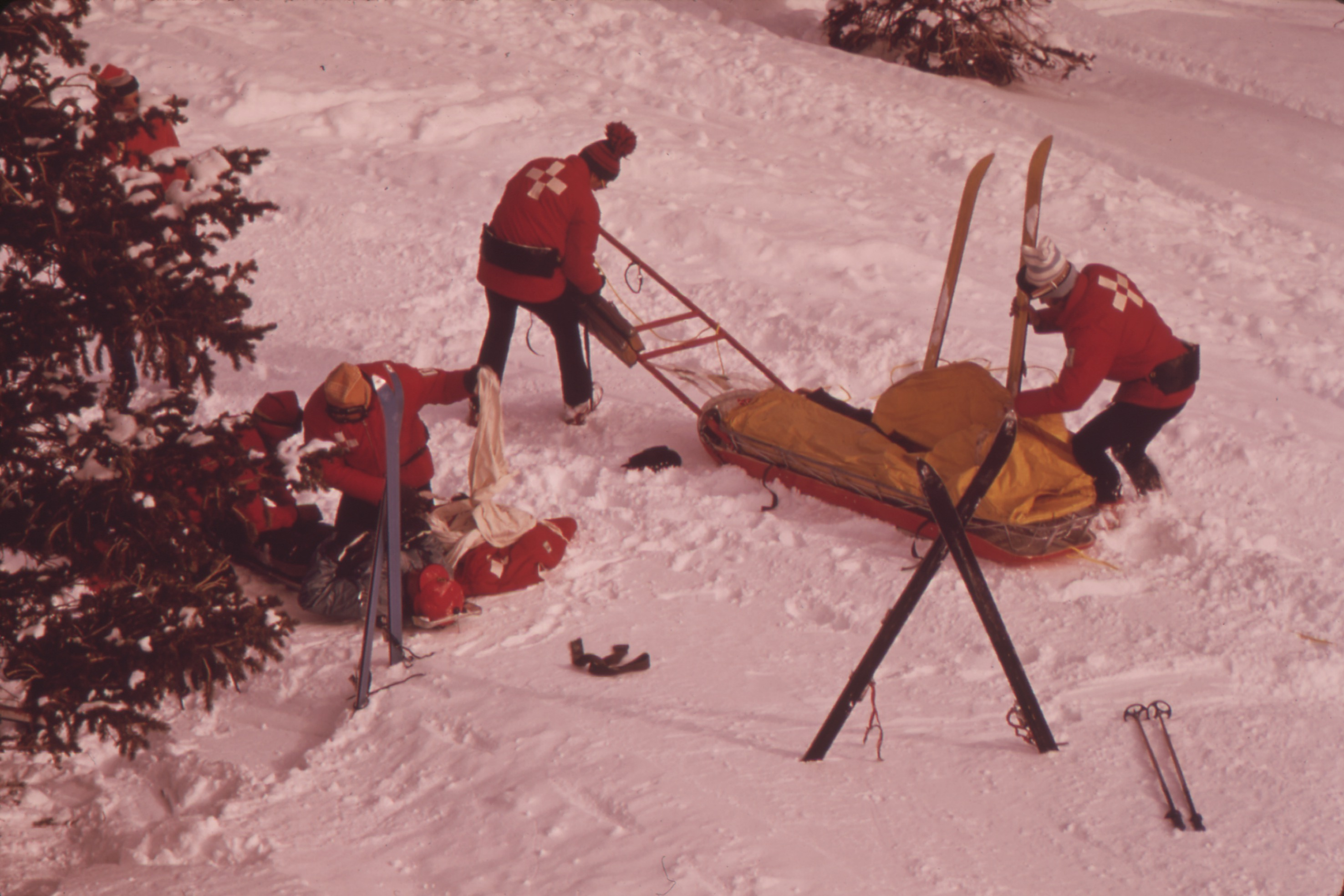
- Synonyms: expedition medicine, austere medicine, remote medicine
- Subdivisions: Expedition medicine Military medicine Diving medicine Aviation medicine
- Significant diseases: Altitude sickness Dysbarism; Envenomation; Heat related illnesses Hypothermia; Major trauma
- Significant tests: Point of care; Ultrasound, blood tests
- Specialist: Wilderness Medicine Physician/Clinician

Wilderness medicine is a medical specialty concerned with medical care in remote, wilderness and expedition environments. The specialty includes prior planning, public health issues, a number of sub-specialties as well as responding to emergencies. One modern definition of wilderness medicine is "medical care delivered in those areas where fixed or transient geographic challenges reduce the availability of, or alter requirements for, medical or patient movement resources".

This rapidly evolving field is of increasing importance as more people engage in outdoor activities, with more participants coming from the extremes of age, and with more people engaging in high risk activities.

The exact aegis of wilderness medicine as a specialty is in constant flux to match the requirements of patients underlying wilderness or remote activities. While wilderness medicine is the preferred terminology for this medical speciality in the United States, terminology such as extreme medicine, remote medicine or expedition medicine, are used internationally.

Wilderness medicine overlaps with a number of other medical specialties in terms of knowledge base and scope of practice, these most notable include; pre-hospital emergency medicine, military medicine, humanitarian aid, disaster medicine and public health. The future of extreme, expedition, and wilderness medicine will be defined by both recipients and practitioners, and empirical observations will be transformed by evidence-based practice.

Unlike wilderness first aid which is focused on the provision of immediate care to the sick and injured in a wilderness setting, wilderness medicine has a far broader approach. These include but are not limited to:

- Prolonged Field Care / Prolonged Casualty Care / Austere Emergency Care
- Secondary care follow up in remote settings, such as expeditions or in humanitarian settings
- The prevention of wilderness medical emergencies, illnesses and injuries
- Public health interventions
- Providing critical care medicine in austere environments

== Scope ==
Wilderness medicine is a varied sub-specialty, encompassing skills and knowledge from many other specialties. The specific curricula will vary but an example can be seen in the curriculum for Fellowship in the Academy of Wilderness Medicine (FAWM):

Scope of Practice
Diving and hyperbaric medicine
- Physics and physiology of depth
- Dive medicine
- Dysbarisms and barotrauma
Tropical and travel medicine
- Immunizations for travel
- Tick-borne illness, malaria and tropical diseases
- Parasites and protozoal infections in the traveler
- Traveler's diarrhea
- Women's issues in traveling
- Safety and security while traveling
- Travel medicine
- Travel and tropical dermatology
- Fever in the returned traveler
- Viral Haemorrhagic Fevers
- STDs in the traveler
High-altitude and mountaineering medicine
- Physics and physiology of altitude
- AMS, HAPE and HACE
- The effect of high altitude on underlying medical conditions
Expedition medicine
- Basic (emergency) field dentistry
- Expedition planning, pre- and post-expedition responsibilities
- Camp safety and layout
Survival, field craft and equipment
- Survival techniques and equipment
- Water procurement
- Food procurement
- Hiking and trekking
- Foot gear and care of the feet
- Clothing selection for wilderness survival
- Land navigation
Search and Rescue
- Search and rescue theory and practice
- Evacuation of injured persons
Sports Medicine
- rock climbing
- ultramarathons
- endurance sports
- kayaking / sailing etc.
Preventive medicine, field sanitation and hygiene
- Field sanitation and hygiene measures
- Vector control and barriers
- Water purification methods
Environmental Medicine
- Lightning injuries
- Submersion and drowning
- Envenomation and toxicology
- Animal attacks
- Heat Illness and dehydration
- Cold injuries and hypothermia
- Nutrition in extreme environments
- Aerospace medicine
Improvised Medicine
- Improvised field wound management
- Improvisational medical techniques in the wilderness
Disaster and Humanitarian Assistance
- Triage
- Field hospital provision
- Malnutrition therapy
Wilderness Emergencies and Trauma Care
- Pre-hospital patient assessment
- Pain management in the wilderness setting
- Emergency airway management
- Psychological response to injury and stress
- Management of trauma and injuries
- Prolonged Field Care (PFC)

== Epidemiology ==
The epidemiology of wilderness medicine is as broad as the patient groups, geography and activities in question. Common risks to many of these are gastrointestinal upset, and minor injuries (ankle sprains, fractures, scrapes and lacerations) as well as the rarer and more serious disorders such as major trauma, heat related illnesses and cardiovascular disease (e.g. cardiac arrest). Alterations to normal routines and the stresses associated with travel can trigger pre-existing mental health conditions. There are also a number of specific wilderness medical emergencies.

== Austere environments interdisciplinary interface ==
Insights from the field of Military Combat Tactical Care (TCCC) interact with wilderness medical practice and protocol development. Moreover, new products and technologies tested in combat are adopted by wilderness medical personnel and vice versa. Experts in wilderness medicine come from various professional groups and specialist backgrounds including the military. More recently, advances in the development of Prolonged Field Care (PFC) guidelines has led to the development of military and civilian PFC courses, such as the international Austere Emergency Care course.

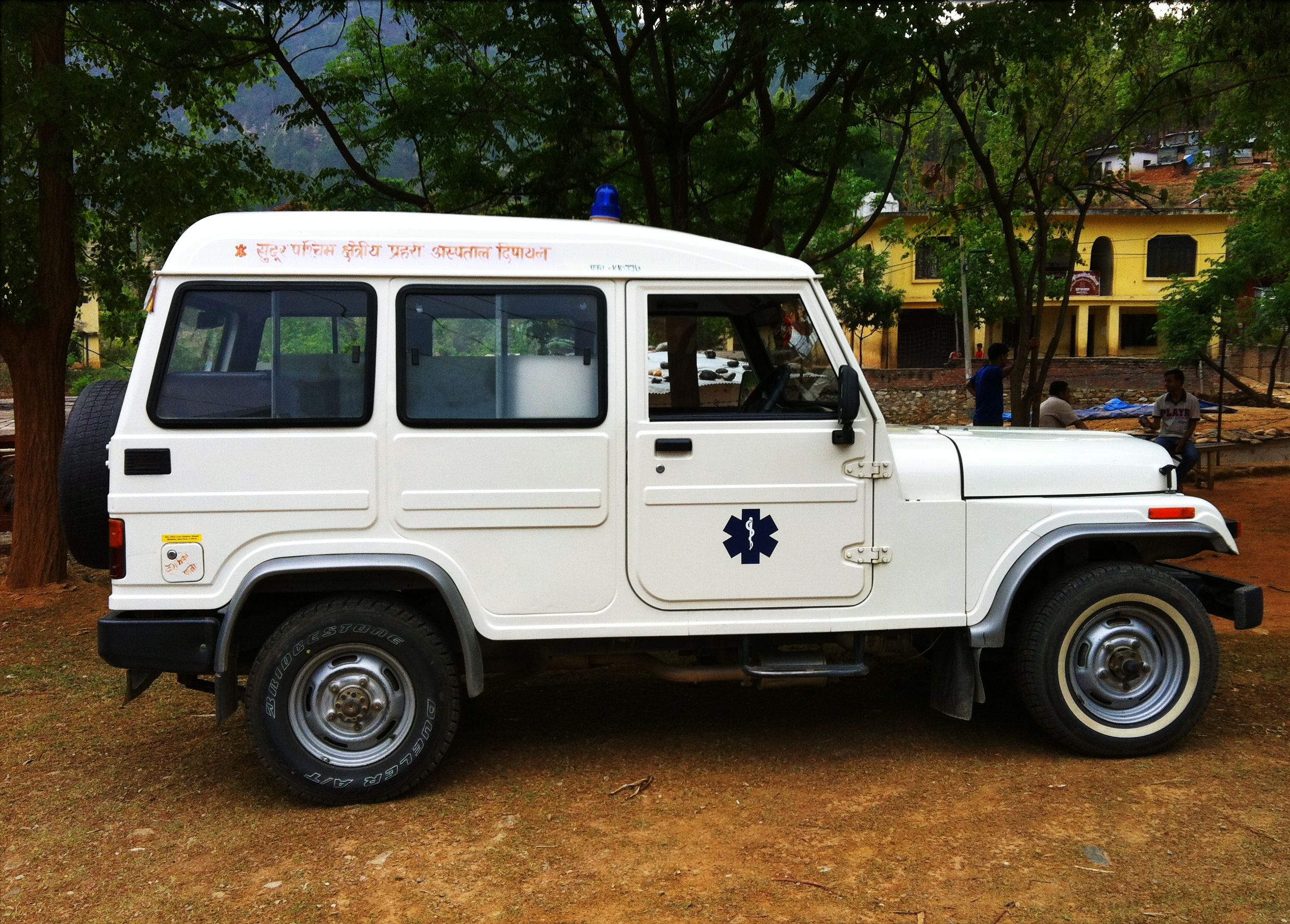
Casualty extrication by road

=== Notable Individuals ===
- Prof Paul Auerbach (January 4, 1951 – June 23, 2021)(Wilderness Medicine)
- Dr Jon Dallimore (Expedition Medicine)
- Dr Luanne Freer (Founder Everest ER)
- Dr Peter Hackett (Altitude Medicine)
- Mark Hannaford (Extreme Medicine)
- Dr Seth C. Hawkins (Wilderness Medicine)
- Dr Olivia Kiwanuka (Founder Adventure Medicine)
- Dr Sean Hudson MBE (Expedition Medicine)
- Prof Chris Imray (Altitude Physiology)
- Dr Kenneth Iserson (Improvised Medicine)
- Col Sean Keenan (Prolonged Field Care, Special Operations Medicine)
- Dr Burjor Langdana (Expedition Dentistry)
- Dr Hannah Lock (Expedition & Mountain Medicine)
- Mr Aebhric O’Kelly (Special Operations Medicine, Prolonged Field Care)

== Education ==
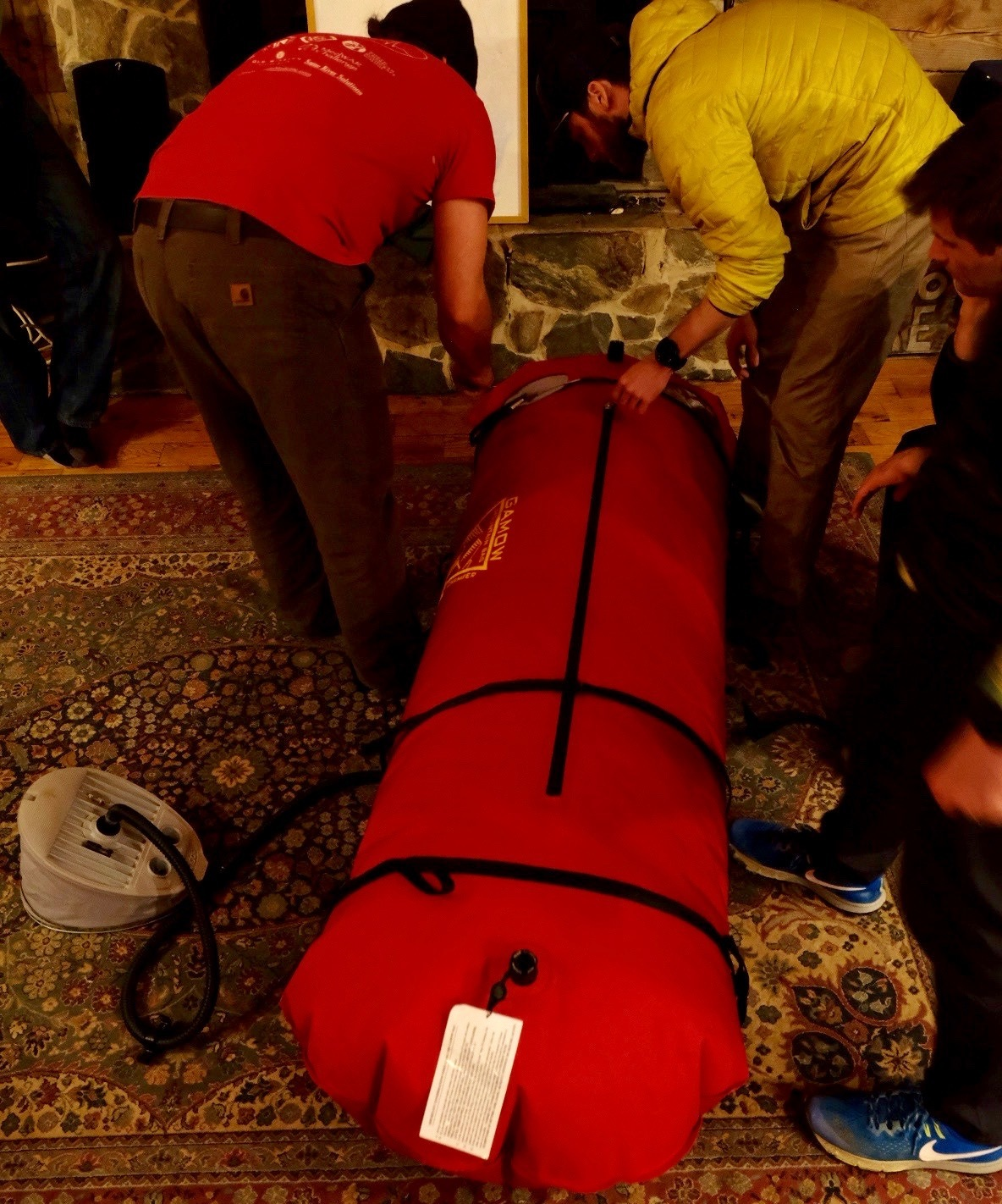
Portable hyperbaric chamber used in altitude sickness

Few countries provide formal medical accreditation for specialists in wilderness medicine. The credentialing that exists is mostly drawn from professional organisations run for and by wilderness medicine clinicians. As a result, there is a huge variety in the education available for wilderness medicine, with only a few educational institutions specialising in this field. The Wilderness Medical Society is perhaps the oldest and most well established organisation in this area and has established international reach. The Wilderness Medical Society produce the Wilderness & Environmental Medicine journal and administer the Fellowship of the Academy of Wilderness Medicine (FAWM) award. The FAWM was first awarded in 2007 in 28 clinicians (20 men and 8 women). The FAWM continues today and recognised educational activity form a number of providers which provide credit towards the Fellowship. The College of Remote and Offshore Medicine (CoROM) in Malta offers FAWM credit as well as; undergraduate, postgraduate and short courses in wilderness medicine-related topics. and mountain medicine. An extreme medicine master's degree has run in partnership between World Extreme Medicine and the University of Exeter since 2016. There are a number of higher education and specialist qualifications available internationally:

Diplomas
- DiMM / DipMtnMed (Mountain Medicine)
- IDEWM (International Diploma in Expedition and Wilderness Medicine) (RCPSG)
- DiDMM (Dive and Marine Medicine)
- DipROM (RCSEd)
Bachelor's degrees
- BSc Remote Paramedic Practice (CoROM)
Master's degrees
- MSc Extreme Medicine, University of Exeter
- MSc Austere Critical Care (CoROM)
- MSc Advanced Practice (Expedition & Wilderness Medicine), Glasgow Caledonian University
Fellowships (Academic)
- FAWM - Fellow of the Wilderness Medical Society™ (3-5 year educational programme)
- MFAWM - Master Fellow of the Wilderness Medical Society™
Fellowships (Contribution to the field)
- FEWM - Fellow of Extreme and Wilderness Medicine (awarded for achievements and contribution to extreme medicine)
- FRGS - Fellow of the Royal Geographical Society (may be awarded for achievement in extreme, wilderness or expedition medicine)

== See also ==
- Wilderness Medical Society
- List of wilderness medical emergencies
- Wilderness medical emergency
- Emergency medicine
- Combat medicine
- Remote physiological monitoring
- History of medicine
- Polytrauma
- Timeline of medicine and medical technology
- Aid station
- Expedition medicine
