= Wilderness Medical Society =

WMS
- Wilderness Medical Society
- Founded: 1983
- Headquarters: 6705 W. Hwy 290, Suite 607-243; Austin, Texas 78735
- Location: United States
- Members: 4,200

The Wilderness Medical Society was created on 15 February 1983 by three physicians from California, United States — Dr. Paul Auerbach, Dr. Ed Geehr, and Dr. Ken Kizer. It is the largest international non-profit membership organization devoted to addressing wilderness medicine challenges, more specifically defined as "medical care delivered in those areas where fixed or transient geographic challenges reduce availability of, or alter requirements for, medical or patient movement resources". It also publishes Wilderness & Environmental Medicine Journal, Wilderness Medicine Magazine, and Wilderness Medicine Clinical Practice Guidelines.

== Academy of Wilderness Medicine ==
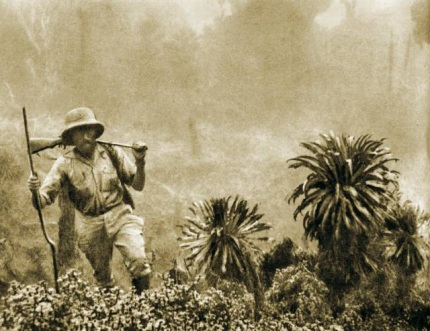
Stereotypical explorer Kazimierz Nowak

The academy seeks to provide a system of adult education and certification in a modern and standardised way to provide a set level of knowledge and education for practitioners working in the wilderness arena.

The goals of the academy are to:

- Professional designation for achievement in Wilderness Medicine
- Validation for the public, patients, and clients of practitioner education in Wilderness Medicine
- Recognition for completing high quality standards in Wilderness Medicine
- Continuing medical education (CME) credit for acquisition of knowledge and hands-on experiences in Wilderness Medicine
- The advancement of an internationally recognized curriculum of Wilderness Medicine categories, topics, and skills

The Academy also maintains the curriculum for the fellowship award. This curriculum is completed over a maximum of a 5-year period and culminates in the award of Fellow being bestowed at the Society's annual conference. The award of the fellowship allows the holder to use the post-nominal letters FAWM (Fellow of the Academy of Wilderness Medicine), as of early 2020 there were just over 600 current fellows. The Academy also manages a "Master's Degree Fellow Program", which bestows a Master Fellow designation, allowing the holder to use the post-nominal letters MFAWM (Master Fellow of the Academy of Wilderness Medicine). The Master Fellow degree program is an advanced, post-fellow certification that was created to denote individuals who have excelled in a specific sub-discipline within the scope of wilderness medicine in addition to being fellows of the Academy of Wilderness Medicine. The master program is an attempt to:

- Further the academic programs of the WMS.
- Allow additional academic enrichment opportunities for WMS members.
- Create a group of experts in specific sub-disciplines for utilization in teaching, lecturing and research development.
- Create a cadre of ever-evolving leaders for the WMS to utilize.
