= EMRS =

EMRS may refer to:

- Emergency Medical Retrieval Service, Scotland
- Eklavya Model Residential School, an educational body of India
