= Highland Emergency =

- Genre: Reality; Documentary
- Developed by: ITV Studios
- Country of origin: United Kingdom
- Original language: English
- No. of series: 3
- No. of episodes: s1: 28 s2: 6 s3: 30

Production
- Production location: Scottish Highlands
- Running time: s1: 30 minutes s2: 60 minutes s3: 30 minutes (including adverts)

Original release
- Network: Channel 5
- Release: 5 August 2008 – 2011

Highland Emergency is a British television documentary series following the work of the emergency services in the Scottish Highlands. It is broadcast on Channel 5 in the UK.

Filmed aboard the search and rescue aircraft of the Royal Navy, Royal Air Force and HM Coastguard as well as the Scottish Ambulance Service (SAS) air ambulances, the show follows the teams on emergencies in the Highlands. The series also follows the work of the Emergency Medical Retrieval Service (EMRS) in transporting critically ill patients, via Royal Navy and SAS aircraft, to better equipped, urban hospitals.

Series one comprised 28 episodes and aired throughout 2008 and 2009. Series 2 first aired on Channel 5 on Friday, 26 February 2010 and consisted of 6 episodes. The main difference in the two series was in the timing, with series 2, episodes being 1 hour in duration rather than 30 minutes as in series 1. Series 3 first aired on Channel 5 on 14 September 2011 and reverted to the 30 minute running time.

== See also ==
- Channel 5
- Emergency Medical Retrieval Service
- BASICS Scotland
