= Scottish Ambulance Service =

Scotland's public ambulance services

- Seirbheis Ambaileans na h-Alba (Scottish Gaelic)

- Area served by the Scottish Ambulance Service
- Type: Special health board
- Established: 1 April 1995
- Headquarters: South Gyle, Edinburgh, Scotland
- Region served: Scotland
- Chair: Tom Steele
- Chief executive: Michael Dickson
- Staff: 6,196 (2022)
- Website: www.scottishambulance.com

The Scottish Ambulance Service (Scottish Gaelic: Seirbheis Ambaileans na h-Alba) is part of NHS Scotland, which serves all of Scotland's population. The Scottish Ambulance Service is governed by a special health board and is funded directly by the Health and Social Care Directorates of the Scottish Government.

It is the sole public emergency medical service covering Scotland's mainland and islands; providing a paramedic-led accident and emergency service to respond to 999 calls, a patient transport service which provides transport to lower-acuity patients, and provides for a wide variety of supporting roles including air medical services, specialist operations including response to HAZCHEM or CBRN incidents and specialist transport and retrieval.

== History ==
In 1948, the newly formed Scottish National Health Service (NHS) contracted two voluntary organisations, the St Andrew's Ambulance Association and the British Red Cross, to jointly provide a national ambulance provision for Scotland, known then as the St Andrew's and Red Cross Scottish Ambulance Service.

After British Red Cross withdrew from the service in 1967, the service was renamed the St Andrew's Scottish Ambulance Service. In 1974, with the reorganisation of the Scottish health services, ambulance provision in Scotland was taken over by the Scottish NHS, with the organisational title being shortened to the current Scottish Ambulance Service.

St. Andrew's First Aid, the trading name of St. Andrew's Ambulance Association, continues as a voluntary organisation and provides first aid training and provision in a private capacity.

The organisation was established as a NHS trust on 1 April 1995 when it legally became known as the Scottish Ambulance Service National Health Service Trust. The trust was dissolved on 1 April 1999 and at the same time constituted as a special health board known as the Scottish Ambulance Service Board.

== Structure ==
=== Emergency Medical Service Capabilities ===
The Scottish Ambulance Service now continues in its current form as one of the largest emergency medical providers in the UK, employing more than 5,000 staff in a variety of roles and responding to 740,631 emergency incidents in 2015–2016 alone. The service, like the rest of NHS Scotland, is free at point of access and is widely used by both the public and healthcare professionals. Employing almost 1,300 paramedic staff, and a further 1,200 technicians, the accident and emergency service is accessed through the public 999 system. Ambulance responses are changing in Scotland and are now prioritised according to patient needs: a traditional, double-crewed ambulance, a single response car or a paramedic practitioner may attend different kinds of emergencies.

=== Ambulance Control Centres ===
The Scottish Ambulance Service also maintains three command and control centres in Scotland, which facilitate handling of 999 calls and dispatch of ambulances; a further 350–400 staff employed as call handlers and dispatchers fulfil this role across three locations: Edinburgh, Glasgow and Inverness. These three centres (which, through use of software, operate as one integrated unit) have been in use since 2004 and handle over 800,000 calls per year. The Advanced Medical Priority Dispatch System (AMPDS) is used for call prioritisation, and provides post-dispatch instructions to callers, allowing medical advice to be given over the phone, before the ambulance arrives. Clinical staff are present to provide clinical oversight and tertiary triage. Co-located with the Ambulance Control Centres (ACC) are patient transport booking and control services, which handle approximately 1 million patient journeys per year.

=== Advanced Paramedics ===
==== Critical Care ====
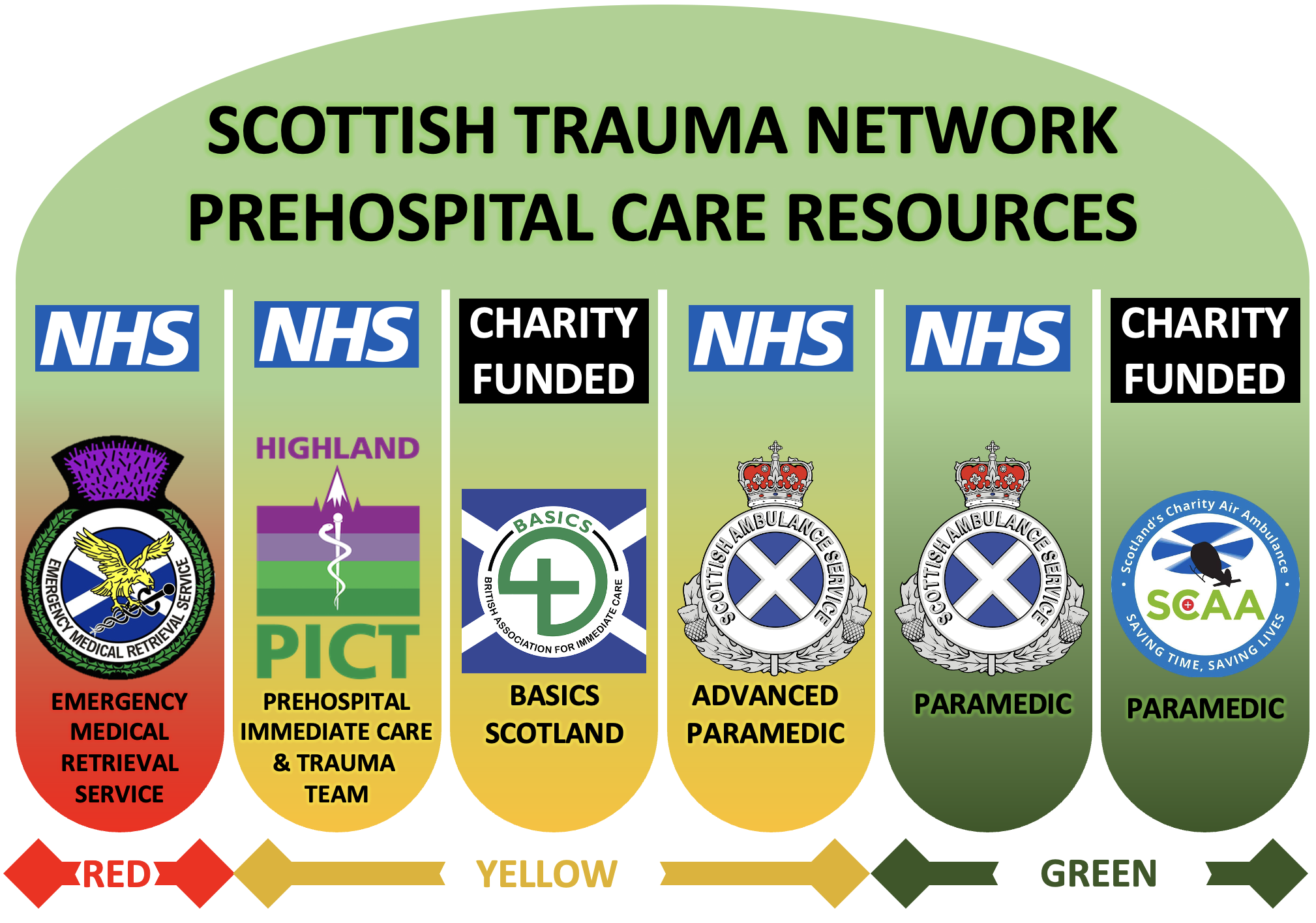
A diagrammatical representation for the prehospital elements of the Scottish trauma.

Scottish Ambulance Service Advanced Practitioners in Critical Care (APCC) are based at Raigmore Hospital, Newbridge Ambulance Station in Edinburgh and Glasgow Airport. They are considered a Yellow level response in relation to the trauma network. They carry injectable medications not usually available to Scottish Ambulance Service paramedics.

They can undertake a number of advanced interventions, including:

- DC cardioversion
- Transthoracic pacing
- Sedation
- Surgical airway
- Thoracostomy
- Advanced clinical assessment
- Advanced decision making
- Point of care ultrasound
- Paediatric intubation

==== Urgent and Primary Care ====
Advanced Practitioners in Urgent & Primary Care (APUC) are located more widely across Scotland. Specifically at the following ambulance stations: Lerwick, Kirkwall, Stornoway, Benbecula, Lairg, Inverness, Lochcarron, Elgin, Aberdeen, Oban, Pitlochry, Callander, Perth, Dundee, Campbeltown, Paisley, Glasgow (Castlemilk fire station), Kilmarnock, Hamilton, Stranraer, Newton Stewart, Dumfries, Biggar, Melrose, Prestonpans, Edinburgh, Livingston, Falkirk, Stirling, Dunfermline, Cupar and Leven.

==== Retrieval Practitioners ====
Scottish Ambulance Service employ a number of Specialist and Advanced Retrieval Practitioners as part of the ScotSTAR service.

=== Role within the Scottish Trauma Network ===
The Scottish Ambulance Service coordinates the pre-hospital and inter-hospital transfer elements of the Scottish Trauma Network. This response comes from the Scottish Ambulance Service and a number of partner agencies. These are sometimes categorised as Red, Yellow and Green resources; of these, Medic One and BASICS Scotland are registered charities. The use of Yellow and Red categorisation is also applied to the enhanced skills offered by different teams or clinicians.

=== Volunteer Resources ===
==== BASICS Scotland ====
The service also uses a number of volunteer responders in conjunction with BASICS Scotland and the Sandpiper Trust. These responders are doctors, nurses and paramedics who volunteer their time to respond on behalf of the ambulance service and help the sick and injured. Equipment is provided to these responders by both the ambulance service and BASICS Scotland, with assistance from the Sandpiper Trust. These responders may be able to offer enhanced "Yellow" skillsets and advanced interventions to assist the other emergency services. Such skills offered by BASICS Scotland responders may include: endotracheal intubation, procedural sedation, advanced analgesia, nerve blocks, cardioversion and thoracostomy with or without drain insertion.

==== Community First Responder ====
There are also a number of Community First Responder schemes across Scotland which support the ambulance service. These are voluntary responders with basic medical training who are deployed to 999 calls, mostly cardiac arrests.

==== Highland Prehospital Immediate Care and Trauma (PICT) Team ====
The Highland PICT Team is based at Raigmore Emergency Department, Inverness and respond to a round 150 patients a month. It was formed in 2016 to address a lack of physician-led pre-hospital care in the Highlands. It uses a doctor and advanced practitioner model, providing advanced care and extending the capabilities of the Scottish Ambulance Service. They were winners of the Highland Heroes award in 2022, with the team's founder and clinical lead receiving an international award for his work in rural pre-hospital medicine in 2021. One of the team's advanced nurses was also nominated for a Scottish Health Award for his part in the care and rescue of a child with traumatic injuries from a mountain.

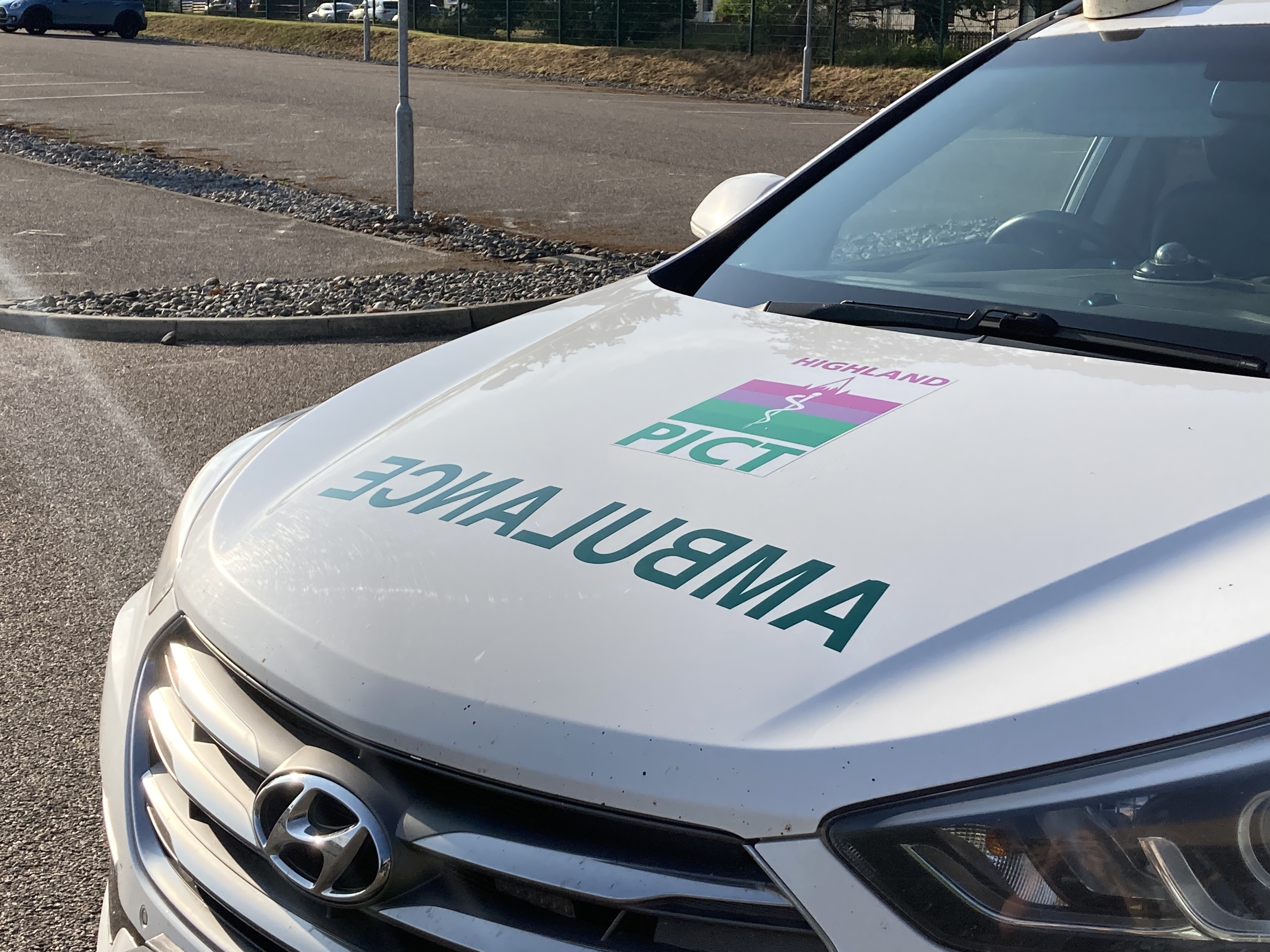
Bonnet of the Scottish ambulance service Highland PICT response car

==== Medic One ====
Medic One is a charity team formed in 1980 which deploys from the emergency department in Edinburgh. In 1998 a charitable trust was set up, aligned to the Medic One team, to facilitate learning and development of Edinburgh hospital staff. It has a fast response car, but relies on the Scottish Ambulance Service sending a driver to the hospital in order to attend 999 calls. The usual composition of the team is an emergency medicine consultant with a middle grade doctor, with one or two emergency nurses. They attend around three patients a month. In 2020 Medic One declared their intention to cease operations and it was noted that their training and governance was unlikely to meet current standards.

==== Scotland's Charity Air Ambulance (SCAA) ====
The Scottish charity air ambulance is a Scottish charity which since 2013 has worked to provide additional air ambulance resources to support the work of the ambulance service. They transport around 1 patient a day. The helicopter is crewed by 1 or 2 paramedics and a pilot.

==== Tayside Trauma Team ====
The Tayside Trauma Team is an enhanced care team working out of Ninewells Hospital, Dundee. They attend around six patients a month. The team is made up of staff from the Emergency department, however they have no team capability to drive on blue lights, so need to be given a lift from another agency. This results in a variable mobilisation time: average time from 999 call to the team leaving the hospital is 25 minutes, with a range of 6 minutes to 1 hour 40 minutes. In 2020 the Tayside trauma team stated they would soon cease to operate and it was noted that their governance and training could be deemed inadequate by current standards.

Tabulated prehospital workload by resource
Trauma Resource	Prehospital patients seen each month	Notes
PICT †	150	Data from January 2022
EMRS Team †	12	Data from 2015–2015
TTT †	5.6	Data from 2009
MEDIC 1 *	3	Data from 1980 to 1990
BASICS Scotland Volunteer *	2-3	Responder on the Outer Hebrides

Graphical prehospital workload by resource
Prehospital Resource	Patient's attended per month
PICT†	150
EMRS Team†	12
Tayside Trauma Team†	5.6
MEDIC1*	3
Individual BASICS Scotland Responder*	3

† NHS Funded * Charity Funded

== Fleet, equipment and uniform ==
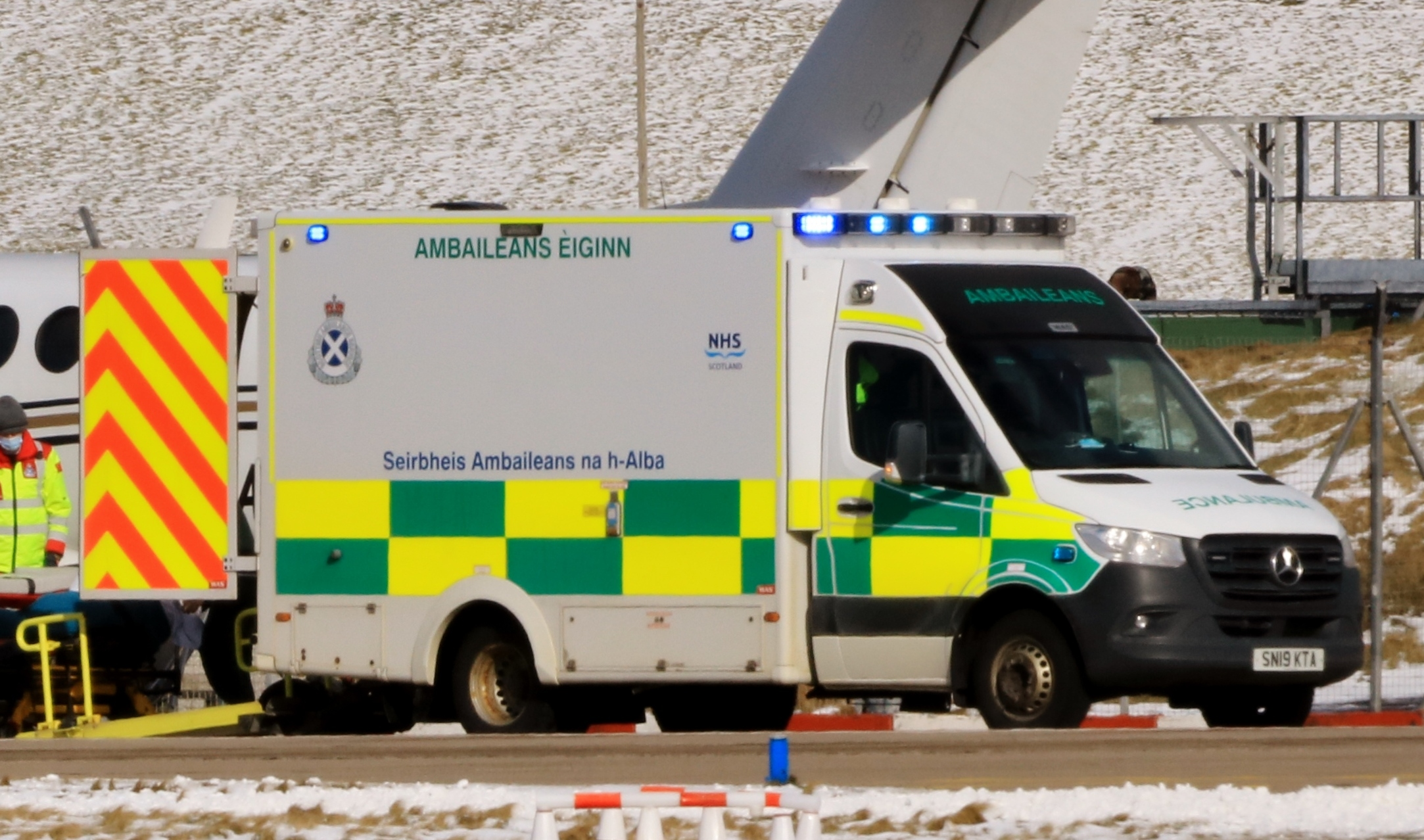
Scottish Ambulance Service Mercedes-Benz Sprinter box ambulance at Sumburgh Airport, March 2023

The Scottish Ambulance Service maintains a varied fleet of around 1,500 vehicles.

Emergency response vehicles include ambulances, and single-response vehicles such as cars and small vans for paramedics. There are also patient-transport ambulances, which are adapted minibuses, lorries and support vehicles for major incidents and events, and specialist vehicles such as 4x4s and tracked vehicles for difficult access. The service also has three bicycles, which are only utilised during events at which Scottish Ambulance Service crews are present.

The geography of Scotland includes urban centres such as Edinburgh and Glasgow, areas of relatively low population density such as Grampian and the Scottish Highlands, and inhabited islands. Thus the fleet provision has to be flexible and include different kinds of vehicle. In the past, 4x4-build ambulances on van chassis were used in more rural areas, and traditional van conversions in more urban areas.

When a large fleet upgrade project was commissioned in 2016, the business case was made to move to a solely box-body on chassis build, to provide some flexibility and more resilient parts procurement. Most of these replacement ambulances have been based on either Mercedes or Volkswagen chassis, with a mixture of automatic or manual transmissions. The equipment used on board Scottish Ambulance Service vehicles broadly falls in line with NHS Scotland and allows for interoperability in most cases. Equipment is standardised nationally and replaced at regular service intervals; for example, high-cost items such as defibrillators are costed and changed every seven years according to clinical need.

The uniform is in line with the NHS Scotland National Uniform standard, which is in keeping with the uniform standard described by the National Ambulance Uniform Procurement group in 2016. Amongst cost and comfort considerations, all Scottish Ambulance Service Staff now wear the national uniform which comprises a dark green trouser/shirt combination. Personal protective equipment (boots, helmet and protective jackets) is issued to all staff and denote rank/clinical rank by way of epaulette and helmet markings.

== Organisation ==
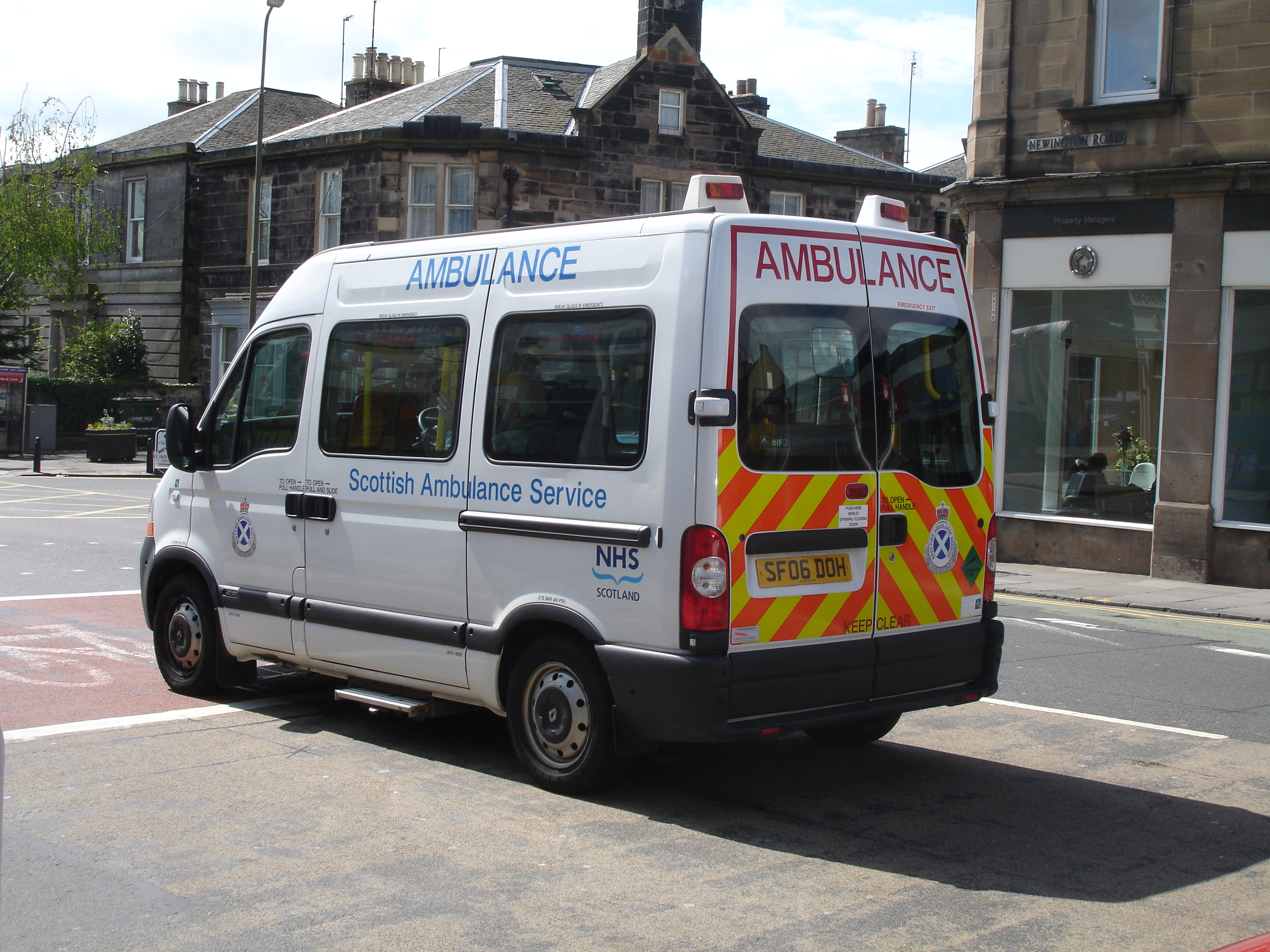
Former Renault Master van ambulance pictured in 2008

Map of the five regional divisions within the Scottish Ambulance Service.

The national headquarters is located at Gyle Square, South Gyle, on the west side of Edinburgh.

There are five divisions within the service, namely:

Scottish Ambulance Service Divisions
Division	Covering	Area	Divisional HQ
North	Highlands, Western Isles, Grampian, Orkney, Shetland	15,607 sq mi (40,420 km^{2})	Inverness
East Central	Fife, Forth Valley, Tayside	4,421 sq mi (11,450 km^{2})	Dundee
West Central	Greater Glasgow, Lanarkshire	1,054 sq mi (2,730 km^{2})	Motherwell
South East	Edinburgh, Lothian and Borders	2,457 sq mi (6,360 km^{2})	Edinburgh
South West	Argyll, Argyll islands, Clyde islands, Ayrshire, Dumfries and Galloway	6,670 sq mi (17,300 km^{2})	Ayr

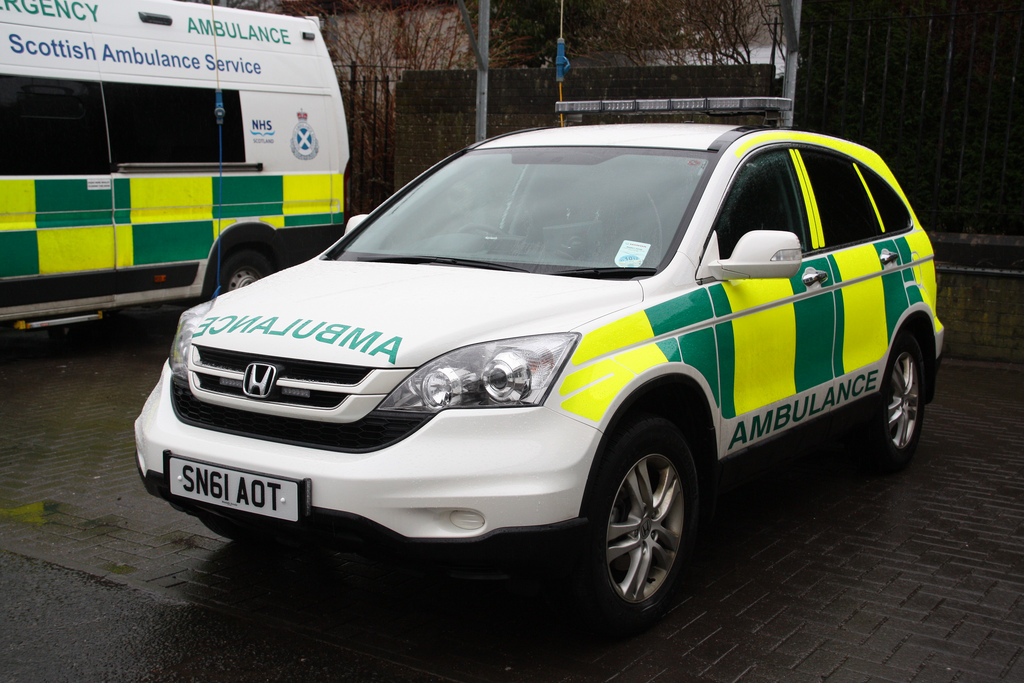
A PRU (Paramedic Response Unit). A Honda CRV 4x4

== Patient transport ==
The Patient Transport Service carries over 1.3 million patients every year. This service is provided to patients who are physically or medically unfit to travel to hospital out-patient appointments by any other means so that they can still make their appointments. The service also handles non-emergency admissions, discharges, transport of palliative care patients and a variety of other specialised roles.

Patient Transport Vehicles come in a variety of forms and are staffed by ambulance care assistants, who work either double- or single-crewed. They are trained to look after patients during the journey, and to provide basic emergency care.

== Air operations ==
Air ambulance bases in Scotland
Key: Ch=Charity SAS=Scottish Ambulance Service

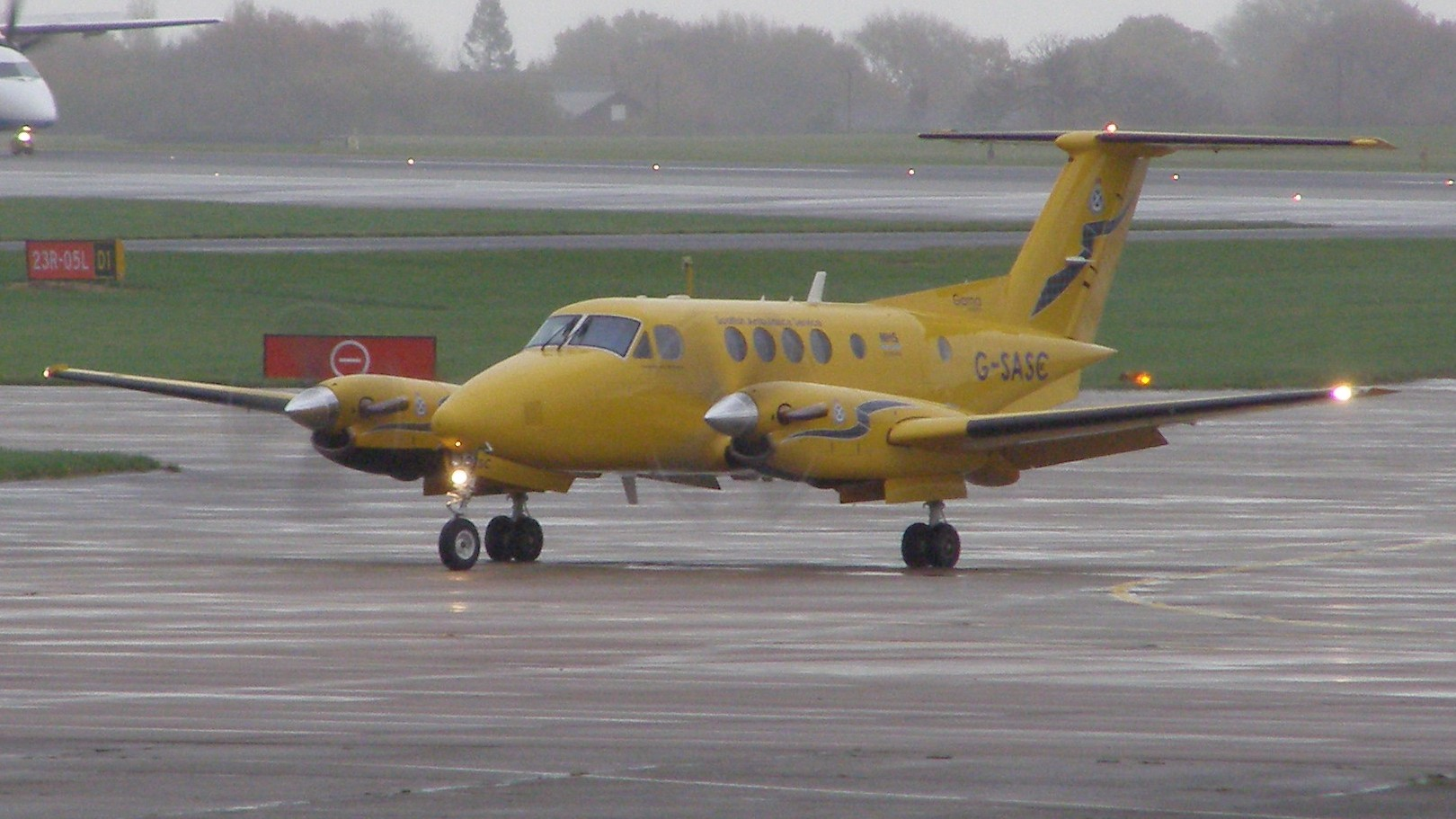
Beechcraft King Air

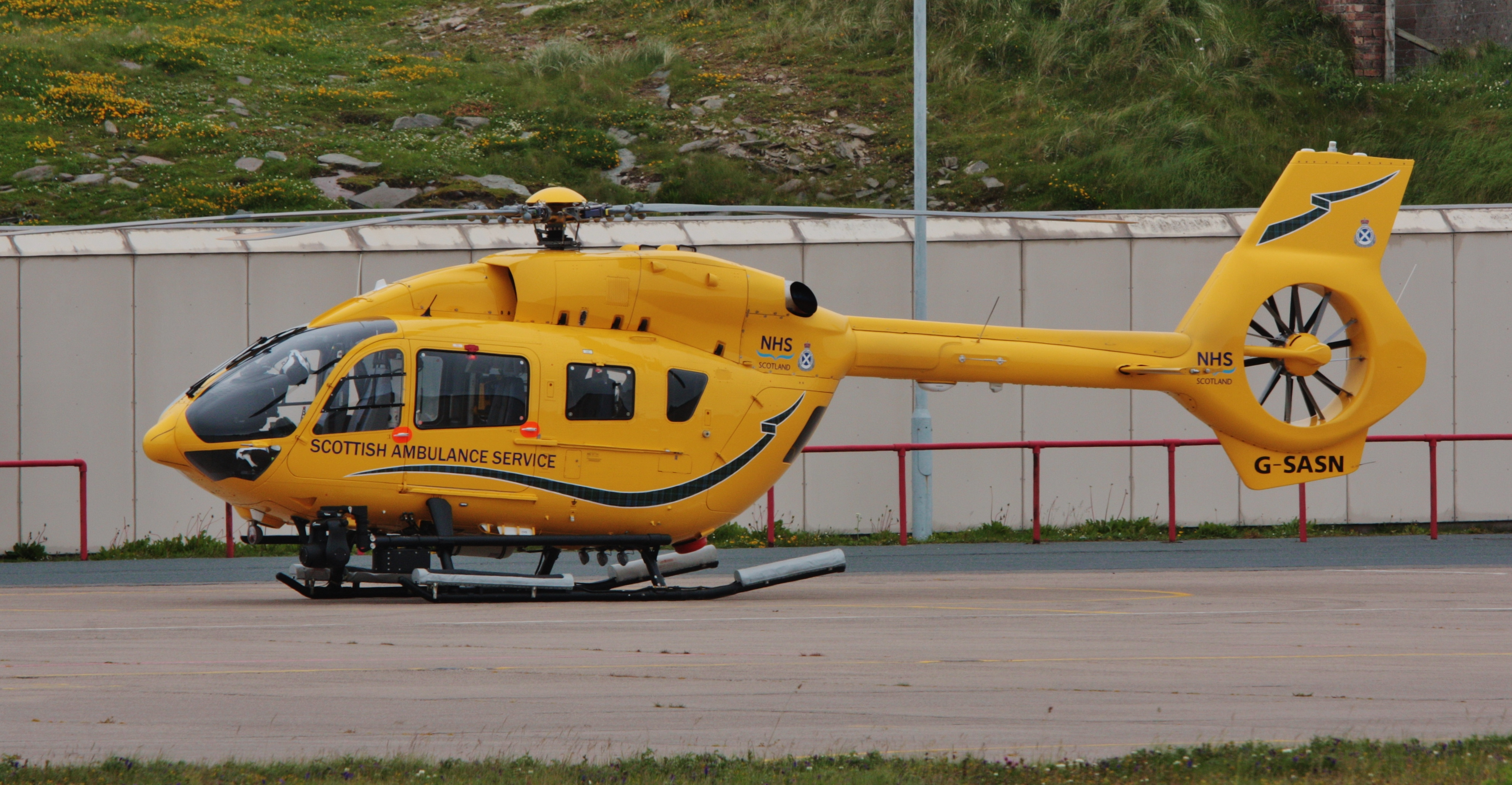
G-SASN - A previous Babcock-operated H145, with the callsign 'Helimed 02'

The service has the only government-funded air ambulance service in the UK, operated under contract by Gama Aviation. The fleet consists of two Airbus H145 helicopters and two Beechcraft B200C King Air fixed-wing aircraft, which provide emergency response and transfers of patients to and from remote areas of Scotland. The two previous H145 helicopters were operated under sub-contract by Babcock Mission Critical Services Onshore until May 2020. In 2015–2016, the air ambulance crews flew 3,849 missions. One helicopter and one King Air are based at a Gama Aviation facility at Glasgow Airport. The other operating bases are Inverness Airport (helicopter) and Aberdeen Airport (King Air).

The aircraft based in Glasgow are regularly used by the Emergency Medical Retrieval Service (EMRS). The air ambulance service was occasionally featured as part of the Channel 5 television documentary series Highland Emergency.

=== Charity-funded air ambulance ===
In late 2010, a charity, Scotland's Charity Air Ambulance (SCAA), was founded to provide a further air ambulance, based at Perth Airport to work alongside the state-funded aircraft. SCAA commenced operations in May 2013 with a MBB Bo 105 helicopter. Since November 2015, SCAA has operated a Eurocopter EC135. The EC135 was previously operated by the state-funded service, until they replaced the fleet with H145 aircraft. The helicopter is crewed by Scottish Ambulance Service paramedics, tasking is from the SAS ambulance control centre at Cardonald.

In April 2018, it was announced by the charity that a drive was underway to raise funds to secure a second helicopter. This aircraft is now operational at Aberdeen Airport.

In October 2025, the charity announced that operations from Aberdeen Airport had been taken over by a new H145 D3 helicopter, reportedly the most capable aircraft of its type in the UK. It was also announced that the Perth base had received an upgraded H135 T2e, featuring night vision capabilities.

=== Notable accidents involving air ambulances ===
- On 19 May 1996, a Britten-Norman BN-2 Islander aircraft operated by Loganair for the Scottish Ambulance Service crashed short of the runway at Lerwick/Tingwall Airport in Shetland while turning to final approach at night during strong and gusting winds. The pilot was killed, and the physician and flight nurse were injured. There was no patient on board at the time.
- On 15 March 2005, a Britten-Norman BN-2 Islander aircraft operated by Loganair crashed into the sea while descending toward Campbeltown Airport in western Scotland. The aircraft was operating an air ambulance flight on behalf of the Scottish Ambulance Service. The pilot and paramedic both died in the crash.

== Special Operations Response Team (SORT) ==
The SORT service is similar to the Hazardous Area Response Team in other parts of the United Kingdom. SORT paramedics have the same scope of practice as a regular paramedic, however have an enhanced scope of practice in relation to Personal protective equipment and other rescue equipment. They do not however carry nor administer ketamine.

In 2010, the service established three teams of specialist accident & emergency ambulance personnel who were given specialist training. This £4.3 million initiative was to provide additional preparedness to be able to respond to large-scale hazardous incidents, such as those that might involve chemical, biological, radiological or nuclear material. The work was in concert with the UK government. In 2019, the SORT services responded to 1,200 calls requiring specialist intervention, and supported a further 9,000 calls.

As of October 2017 there are five SORT teams; three full-time based in Edinburgh, Glasgow, and Aberdeen, and two on-call teams in Inverness and Dumfries. These teams provide a specialist response to major incidents, and provide paramedic care in hostile environments. The team provides capability in arenas such as water rescue, safe working at height, search and rescue including the use of breathing apparatus, and confined space working. The SORT teams also provide a full-time emergency decontamination and inner-cordon capability.

== ScotSTAR ==
With the remote towns and villages in Scotland often being hours away from advanced medical treatment, Scottish Specialist Transport and Retrieval (ScotSTAR) was set up incorporating paediatric and neonatal retrieval and transfer teams and the two adult Emergency Medical Retrieval Service teams (EMRS). The ScotSTAR service was set up on 1 April 2014 and transported 2,654 patients 2014–2015. The service uses multiple vehicles, either owned by the ambulance service or other organisations: specialist ambulances and cars, five air ambulances and HM Coastguard helicopters. The service is based in Glasgow.

EMRS (The Emergency Medical Retrieval Service) was created in 2004 by ten emergency medical consultants from Glasgow and Paisley. Initially, the service provided aeromedical cover to six isolated hospitals within Argyll and Bute. The ten consultants only had £40,000 worth of funding for medical equipment. In its first year the service transported 40 patients. In years to follow, the clinical crew began to gather evidence for the life-saving impact and cost effectiveness of the service. Following a successful 18-month trial period in the West of Scotland funded by the Scottish Government, in 2010 the service was opened up to the whole of the country, after securing permanent funding. The service is currently staffed by 47 part-time retrieval consultants, 14 retrieval practitioners, and 4 registrars, carrying out around 1000 missions every year.

== Training academy ==
The service has its own dedicated training academy within the campus of Glasgow Caledonian University, which opened in June 2011. The facility has purpose built classrooms, lecture theatres, syndicate rooms and a clinical simulation area that recreates a 16-bed hospital ward and Accident & Emergency department allowing realistic interaction with other trainee healthcare professionals.

From 1996 until April 2011, the service used its own dedicated training college located at Barony Castle in Eddleston near Peebles. Set in 25 acres (100,000 m^{2}) of formal gardens and woodlands, Barony was a residential training and conference centre with 78 bedrooms that allowed the service to carry out all its training in house. Between 1985 and 1996 it used the former Redlands women's and children's hospital in Glasgow's west end and prior to that the training school was based at Bangour Hospital before moving to Gartloch Hospital.

== Controversy and challenges ==
- In 1999 it emerged that the Financial Director of the Scottish Ambulance Service had previously been jailed for fraud.
- In 2018 it was revealed that frontline staff had been working "dangerously long hours", with one staff member working a 36 hour long shift. This was described as a national scandal at the time.
- In 2020 both the Tayside Trauma Team and Medic 1 announced their continuing existence was unsustainable and the services would be terminated, removing this physician led resource from the ambulance services capabilities.
- 2021 saw the Scottish Ambulance Service struggle to staff frontline ambulances; seeking help from firefighters, the military, and non-medical trained drivers to crew ambulances attending 999 calls. A number of tragic stories emerged highlighting the personal cost of this crisis, including one patient who died after waiting 40 hours for an ambulance, and an elderly man who died on his driveway after waiting four and a half hours for an ambulance. In the same year it was also revealed that a number of senior NHS managers from the ambulance service were running a camper van hire business during work hours, while planning for the COP26 international conference.
- Research published in 2022 demonstrated that four out of five Scottish paramedics were considering quitting their jobs. It also revealed that 87% of staff do not feel valued by the Scottish Ambulance Service. The same report highlighted a third of staff working shifts lasting 15–20 hours. The same year, a story was published in which a member of the public was asked to perform CPR on their relative, alone in the back of the ambulance without help from the ambulance crew while en route to hospital. In the summer of 2022 it was claimed that an ambulance service senior manager was suspended as a result of requesting that a member of control-room staff leave their post and collect him (and his family) from Glasgow Airport. In 2022 it also came to light that EMRS have been deploying as a “Red Team” for the Scottish Ambulance Service without a Consultant on board.
- In April 2024, the ambulance service was criticised for being 'under-resourced' and using an elderly fleet of 337 ambulances, registered before February 2019, out of a wider fleet of 1,298 ambulances. The oldest ambulance in active service with the Scottish Ambulance Service, registered in 2005, was noted to be based in Dumfries.

== See also ==
- Air ambulances in the United Kingdom
- Ambulance services in the United Kingdom

Other Scottish emergency and non-emergency services:

- NHS 24
- Police Scotland
- Scottish Fire and Rescue Service
