= Sandpiper Trust =

Scottish healthcare charity

- The current logo
- Formation: 20 February 2001
- Legal status: Active
- Purpose: The advancement of health
- Headquarters: Aberuthven
- Location: Scotland
- Region served: Scotland
- Trustees: Penny Dickson; Aly Dickson; Claire Maitland; Caroline Ross-Stewart
- CEO: Lorna Duff
- Affiliations: BASICS Scotland; Scottish Ambulance Service
- Staff: 6
- Website: www.sandpipertrust.org

Sandpiper Trust is a Scottish-based charity whose aims are related to improving pre-hospital immediate care in remote and rural Scotland. It receives no Government, NHS or Local Authority funding. They are a major supporter of BASICS Scotland.

== History and origin ==
Sandpiper Trust was founded in 2001 after the tragic death of a 14-year-old child called Sandy Dickson in an accident in 2000. This accident highlighted to the founders (his family) that critical illness does not respect geography, and that an ambulance can not always be rapidly accessible when accidents occur in remote and rural areas.

This led the trust to provide life-saving emergency medical equipment (in the Sandpiper Bag) to rural clinicians. With the hope of enabling the provision of prehospital emergency care in situations where ambulance response times are long, or where the skills of a senior clinician (doctor, nurse or paramedic) may be a valuable augmentation to the statutory ambulance service, the Scottish Ambulance Service.

Sandpiper Trust also provides BASICS Scotland volunteer responders with the technology to connect them to the Scottish Ambulance Service despatch system, monitor their location for safety purposes, and allow communication with the ambulance control room and other emergency services. Currently a number of responders are provided with Airwave digital radios, while others have vehicle locator systems.

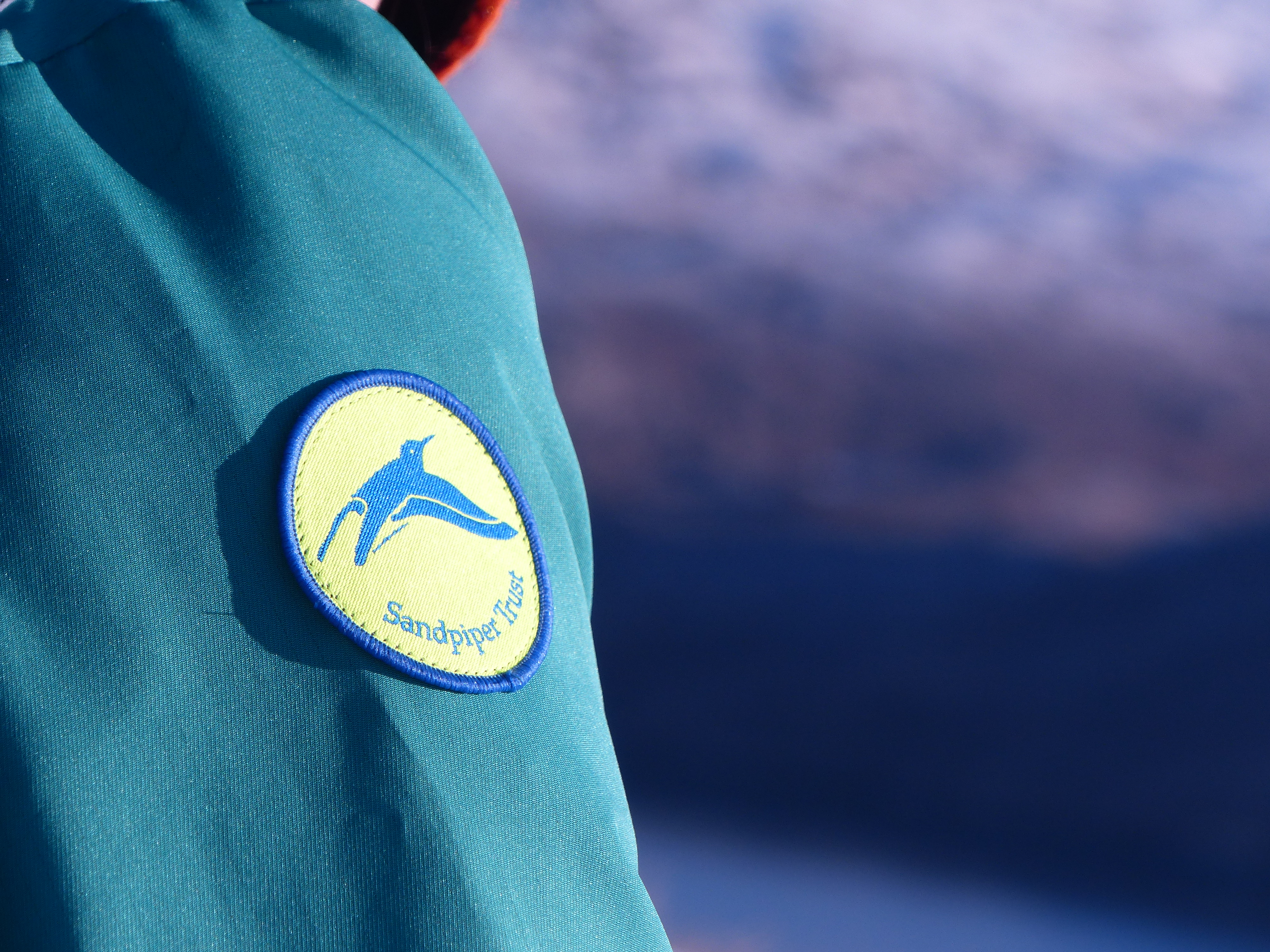
Sandpiper Trust logo on a responder's jacket

=== Key individuals ===
The patron of Sandpiper Trust since its inception has been Gavin Hastings. Hastings has hosted many events for The Sandpiper trust and continues to generously devote his time and energy to supporting the Trust.

The trust has four trustees; Penny Dickson, Aly Dickson, Claire Maitland and Caroline Ross-Stewart. It also has two medical advisors, to ensure they are able to facilitate rural immediate medical care to the best of their abilities, these are: Dr Ewen McLeod and Dr Ben Price.

=== Charitable objectives ===
Sandpiper Trust has four core objectives. Firstly to work towards the relief of the suffering (from illness or injury) of people in Scotland through the provision of immediate medical care, secondary to facilitate the advancement of the study of immediate medical care through the provision of education and training across Scotland. Thirdly the provision of medical equipment to facilitate the first objective and finally, relieving human suffering through the promotion of medical research.

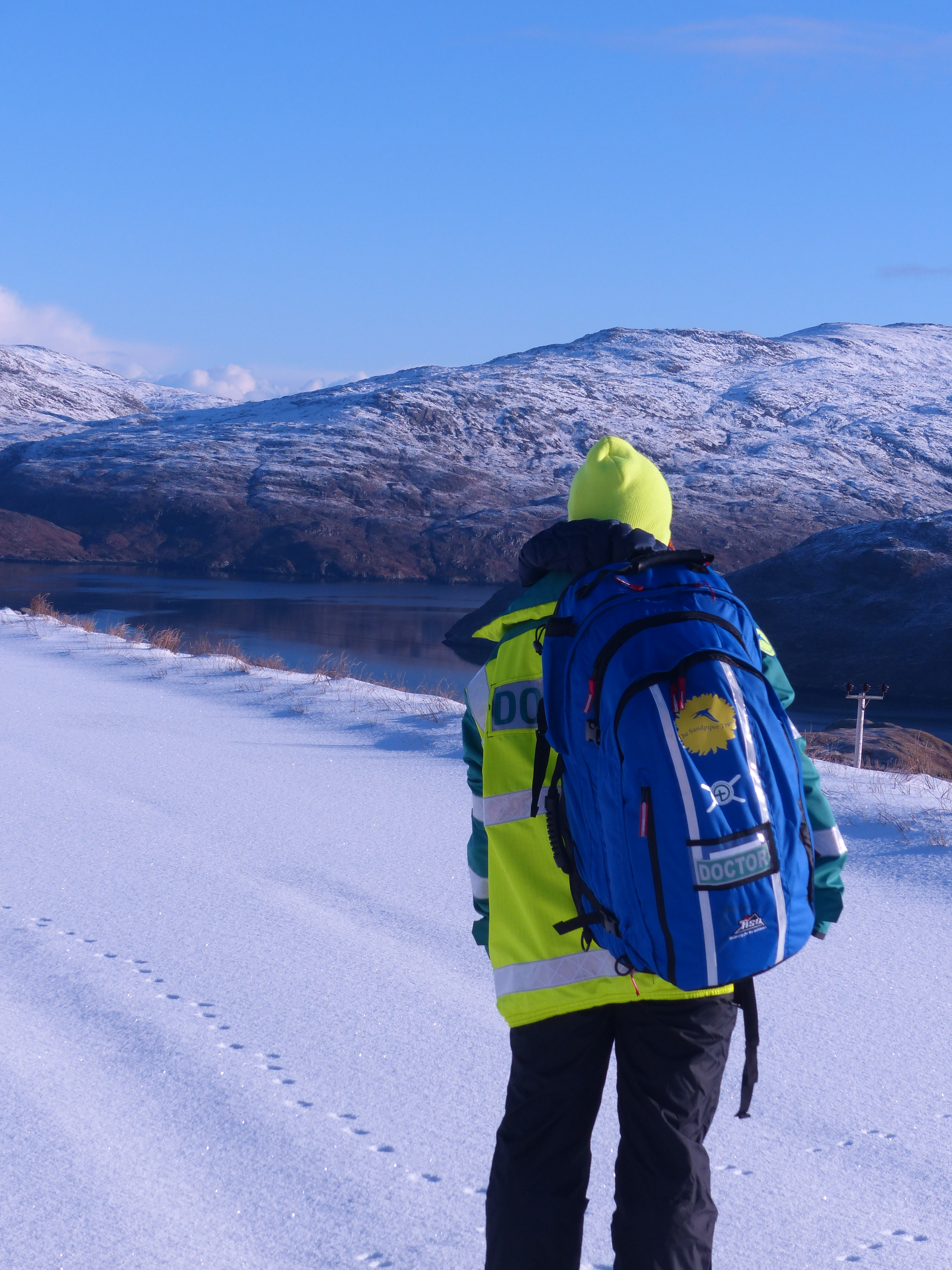
BASICS Scotland Doctor equipped with a response bag and clothing from The Sandpiper Trust

=== Fundraising ===
==== Sandpiper Cookbook ====
As part of their fund-raising activities, Sandpiper Trust produced their own cookbook, compiled by Claire Maitland and published by Finks Publishing in 2009. It includes recipes from a wide range of authors/chefs including Gordon Ramsay, it also contains a number of cocktails (including Tiger Woods exclusive wedding cocktail) and unusually for a cookbook, essential emergency medical tips.

==== The Swallow, The Owl and The Sandpiper ====
The trust also produced this text in 2013, described as "A collection of thought provoking prose and poetry, to help provide comfort, strength and support during difficult times", and listed as a motivational self-help guide on Amazon. It is ranked at number 29 in the amazon best-sellers list for poetry anthologies.

==== Other fundraising activities ====
In addition to sales of these two books, the trust also receives donations from organisations and individuals, and in 2021 a Highlands family raised a significant amount for the charity through open water swimming.

The charity also regularly runs charity auctions to raise money, and has been donated auction items such as handwritten lyrics from Annie Lennox, luxury Scottish fishing trips, and sculptures, among other things.

== Projects ==
=== Sandpiper Bag ===
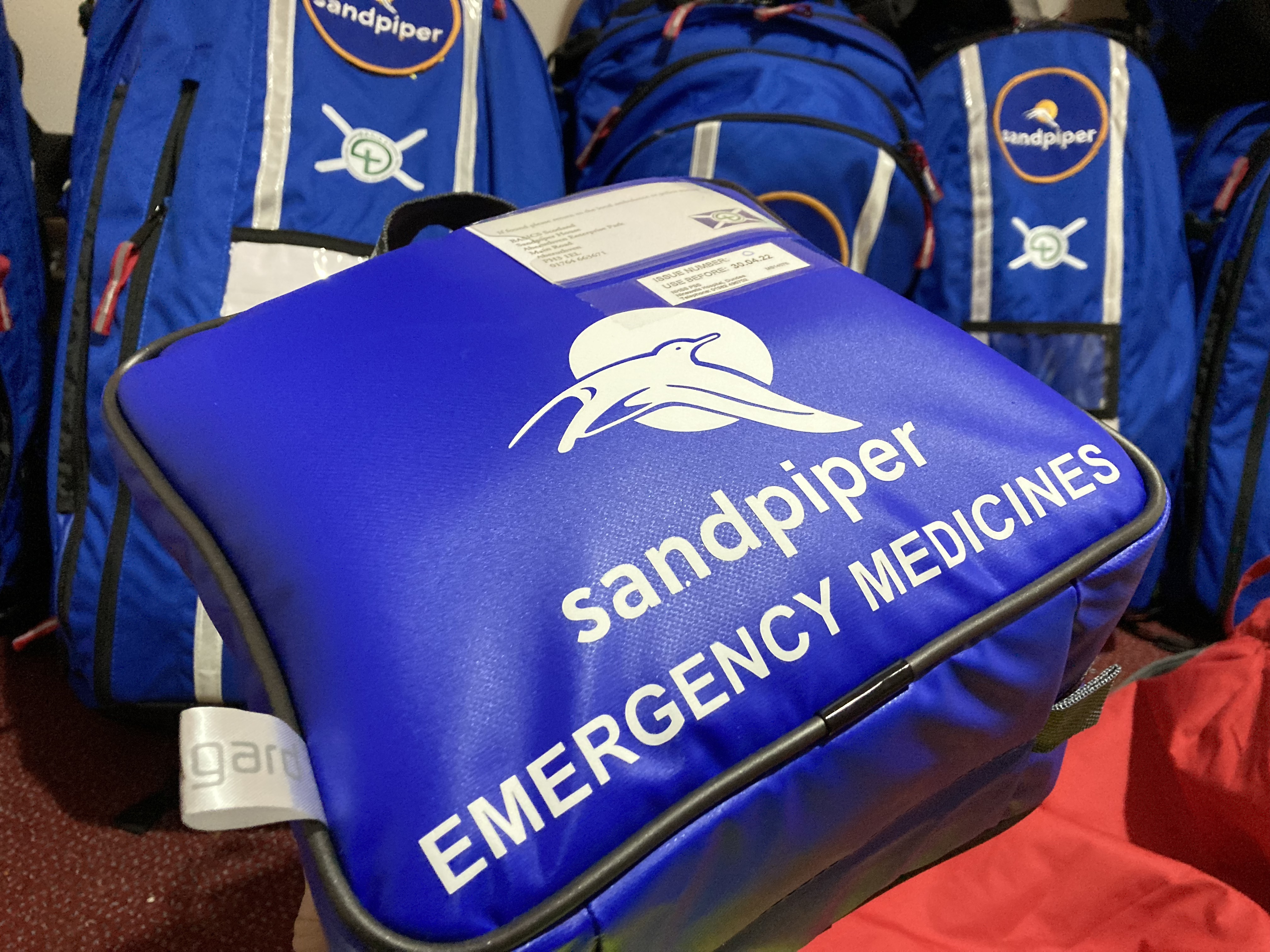
The Sandpiper emergency medicines pouch with Sandpiper Bags in the background

Sandpiper Trust has developed the internationally respected Sandpiper Bag, which is used across Scotland by BASICS Scotland responders, in Australia through the newly formed charity Sandpiper Australia and is the official immediate care bag for the Faculty of Prehospital Care examinations at the Royal College of Surgeons of Edinburgh.

Each bag contains over 50 items of life-saving medical equipment, these are organised into removable pouches, allowing them to be passed out to different team members to facilitate parallel working in acute situations. To date over a thousand Sandpiper Bags have been distributed across Scotland and beyond. The 1000th bag was presented by Elizabeth II in 2016.

=== Sandpiper Emergency Medicines Pouch ===
In 2021 The Sandpiper Trust funded and in conjunction with BASICS Scotland, developed the Emergency Medicines pouch for active BASICS Scotland volunteer responders. The drug pouch contains an array of medicines required for the initial management and stabilisation of critically unwell patients across rural Scotland.

=== Wildcat Project ===
The Sandpiper Wildcat Project was a research programme focussing on saving lives after out of hospital cardiac arrest, through optimising the chain of survival in rural Grampian, Scotland. The driving hypothesis being that providing enhanced training and equipment a team of volunteer community first responders, who are then targeted to areas where Scottish Ambulance Service response times can be prolonged would lead to earlier, effective resuscitation, hopefully resulting in improved patient outcomes. The project won the Blue Light Hero award at the Pride of Aberdeen awards in 2017.

=== COVID-19 pandemic response ===
During the COVID-19 pandemic, the trust distributed over 700 pulse oximeters to remote and rural GP practices throughout Scotland, to aid with the diagnosis of, and subsequent monitoring of patients affected by COVID-19. These have been used in the Orkney and Shetland Islands, Coll, Arran, Tomintoul, Killin, Callander, Strachur, Mull, Galloway, Kenmay, Skye and other practices throughout Grampian.
