= ScotSTAR =

Scottish Specialist Transport and Retrieval (ScotSTAR) is the Scottish national service for adult, paediatric and neonatal patients. The service is run by the Scottish Ambulance Service and brings together NHS Scotland's three specialist transport and retrieval services: the Scottish Neonatal Transport Service (SNTS), the Transport of Critically Ill and Injured Children Service and the Emergency Medical Retrieval Service (EMRS). The service operates from a bespoke base near Glasgow and expects to be able to cater for 2,200 critically ill children and adults every year.

== History ==
The Scottish National Paediatric Retrieval Service was established in April 2001. EMRS were formed in 2004. In November 2011, a strategic review project board looked at Scotland's patient transport arrangements and recommended harmonisation of the existing specialist services. In April 2013, the Scottish Ambulance Service approved the plans which were expected to cost £9.3 million a year. The initiative become operational April 2014. In September 2015, the teams moved to a purpose-built facility that located beside Glasgow airport.

== Scottish Neonatal Transport Service (SNTS) ==
The Scottish Neonatal Transport Service, a vital component of ScotSTAR, specializes in the secure transportation of unwell newborns within Scotland and, at times, when Scottish infants need to be relocated to more distant locations.

This service is operated by a dedicated group comprising neonatal consultants, advanced neonatal nurse practitioners, transport fellows (physicians), expert neonatal transport nurses, and ambulance personnel. The staffing for each journey is tailored to meet the specific requirements of the infant.

=== Regional Divisions ===
This national service is organized into three regional divisions:

==== Northern Team ====
The Northern team operates from its base at Aberdeen Royal Infirmary and serves the regions of North Tayside, Grampian, the Highlands, Orkney, and Shetland.

==== Southeast Team ====
Located at the Simpson Centre for Reproductive Health in Edinburgh, the Southeast team is responsible for serving South Tayside, Lothians, Fife, and the Borders.

==== Western Team ====
Situated at the ScotSTAR hangar at Glasgow Airport, the Western team covers Greater Glasgow and Clyde, Dumfries and Galloway, Ayrshire, Forth Valley, Lanarkshire, Argyll, and the Western Isles.

== Transport of Critically Ill and Injured Children Service ==
This division is responsible for the transport of sick children.

== Emergency Medical Retrieval Service (EMRS) ==
The Emergency Medical Retrieval Service (EMRS) provides aeromedical critical care retrieval and pre-hospital critical care to people in Scotland in the form of two retrieval teams (North and West). The service provides patients in remote and rural areas with rapid access to the skills of a consultant or senior doctor in emergency medicine, intensive care medicine or anaesthesia, and facilitates transfers to larger, better equipped urban hospitals. The EMRS functions supplementary to the regular Scottish Ambulance Service Air Ambulance service. Unlike air ambulance services in other parts of the UK, both services are funded by the Scottish Government.

EMRS North team (in Aberdeen) is on base between 0800 and 1800, and EMRS West team (in Glasgow) are on base between 0700 and 2300, for immediate deployment; outside these hours the teams are on-call and will take at least 30 minutes longer to deploy.

Services are provided in partnership with the Scottish Ambulance Service utilising road transport, helicopters and fixed-wing aircraft. The EMRS now operates as part of ScotSTAR, the Scottish national retrieval service, sharing a bespoke base at Glasgow Airport.

=== Personnel ===
EMRS Teams are composed of Retrieval Practitioners (Advanced or Specialist) and one or more doctors. Retrieval Practitioners come from a nursing or paramedic background and receive additional training in retrieval medicine. There are 47 part-time consultants who work with EMRS and a smaller number of registrar or clinical fellow grade doctors.

During staffing pressures in the early COVID-19 pandemic, the service occasionally deployed a Registrar with a Retrieval Practitioner as an operational team.

=== Clinical Interventions ===
==== Pre-hospital Critical Care ====
The teams attend around 1 prehospital patient a day, delivering advanced airway management to 22.8% of patients attended and other critical care interventions to 25.2% of prehospital patients. The EMRS team perform prehospital anaesthesia as required, with a complication rate of 4%, and a first pass success rate of 80%. This is comparable to other UK prehospital services offering this intervention.

EMRS are able to undertake surgical procedures at the road side, such as resuscitative thoracotomy, however EMRS does not have "specialist obstetric skills".

==== Retrieval and Transport ====
EMRS provide a retrieval service for adult patients across Scotland (paediatric retrieval is performed by ScotSTAR). EMRS' average (median) on-scene time with a patient requiring inter-hospital transport before transporting is one hour.
