= Highland PICT Team =

Scottish emergency prehospital care team

- Headquarters: Raigmore Hospital Emergency Department, Inverness
- Region served: Highland and Moray
- Area size: Highland and Moray

The Prehospital Immediate Care and Trauma (PICT) Team is a prehospital care team which operates from Raigmore Hospital emergency department in Inverness, Scotland. It receives funding from NHS Highland and the Scottish Trauma Network and initially from BASICS Scotland.

They are an enhanced care team responding to trauma and other critical care incidents in Inverness and the Northwest Highlands, utilising a rapid response car. PICT comprises either a senior doctor from Raigmore Hospital or a rural GP, together with a Scottish Ambulance Service advanced practitioner in critical care.

In light of the sparsely distributed ambulance resources in the Highlands and the challenges of distance and weather in the north west of Scotland, PICT has a considerable remit beyond trauma, operating as a Community Emergency Medicine (CEM) service as well as a prehospital trauma team. PICT provides support to ambulance crews and community responders in medical emergencies, and also provides a "see and treat" service to patients in order to prevent transport and possible hospital admission for problems manageable at home. In this way PICT acts as a senior decision maker for prehospital clinicians across the North of Scotland.

The team was also the winner of the 2022 Highland Heroes awards in the category of Emergency Services.

== Remit and workload ==
PICT currently operates 12 hours per day, seven days a week across the Highlands and Moray. They respond to around 150 patients a month, attending a range of 999 calls, but being tasked to the most serious calls (major trauma, cardiac arrests etc). For comparison, MEDIC 1 in Edinburgh attended around 3 patients a month in the decade between 1980 and 1990, and the Tayside Trauma Team (TTT) attended 5.6 patients a month, Emergency Medical Retrieval Service teams attend 33 primary retrievals (prehospital care patients) a month, while an individual BASICS Scotland volunteer responder may attend 2-3 calls a month.

Tabulated prehospital workload by resource
Trauma Resource	Prehospital patients seen each month	Notes
PICT †	150	Data from January 2022
EMRS Team †	33	Data from 2023
TTT †	5.6	Data from 2009
MEDIC 1 *	3	Data from 1980 to 1990
BASICS Scotland Volunteer *	2-3	Responder on the Outer Hebrides

Graphical Prehospital Workload by Resource per Month
Prehospital Resource	Patient's Attended per Month
PICT†	150
EMRS Team†	33
Tayside Trauma Team†	5.6
MEDIC1*	3
Individual BASICS Scotland Responder*	3

† NHS Funded * Charity Funded

The PICT Team responds by land to major trauma (as an integrated part of the Scottish Trauma Network) and critically unwell patients in the Highlands of Scotland. The doctor on the PICT Care will also assume the role of the medical incident officer when required at a major incident. They work to standard operating procedures, and national clinical guidelines for best practice. The team currently responds in a Scottish Ambulance Service vehicle. The PICT Team have attended a variety of incidents, including aircraft crashes, road traffic collisions, stabbings, shootings and critically unwell patients.

When audited, it was found that the PICT Team were able to discharge on scene 22% of the cases they attended; 17% of their patients were paediatrics, and 39% were traumatic injuries. This is due to the PICT Team including a senior doctor who is able to facilitate alternative care pathways or provide interventions in someone's home, such as access to prescription medications to allow them to avoid attending the hospital.

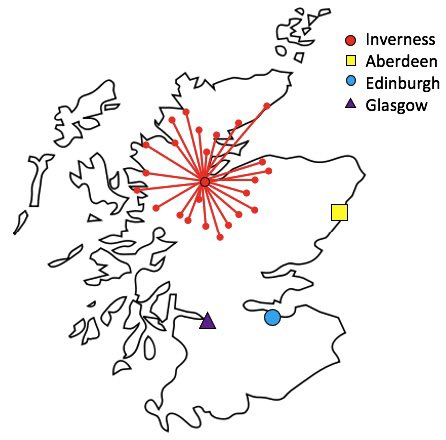
Highland PICT response map

== Enhanced Medical Care ==
In addition to providing senior decision making support, the PICT Team provide a number of clinical interventions which currently lie outwith the standard remit of a Scottish Ambulance Service paramedic, such as;

The administration of:

- ketamine, levobupivicaine (and intralipid if required), adenosine, magnesium sulfate, fentanyl or diamorphine.

Undertaking:

- Diagnostic and procedural ultrasound, wound closure, joint reduction, regional anaesthesia, sedation, pacing, cardioversion, thoracostomy (and drain insertion), mechanical CPR device deployment, amputation or surgical airway.

Facilitating:

- Onward referral
- Provision of prescription medications or a prescription for the patient to collect at a pharmacy
- Senior decision making

Intervention	Rationale	EMRS	PICT	AP(CC)
Amputation	Extrication / Access	Yes	Yes	No
Anaesthesia	Maintain ventilation	Yes	No	No
Blood product administration	Maintain circulation	Yes	No	No
Central line insertion	Vascular access	Yes	No	No
Chest drain insertion	Pneumothorax management	Yes	Yes	No
IV Antibiotics	Reduce morbidity	Yes	Yes	Yes
IV Calcium Gluconate/Chloride	Prevention of cardioplegia	Yes	Yes	Yes
IV Ketamine	Sedation and Analgesia	Yes	Yes	Yes
Reduction of fractures	Minimize pain and morbidity	Yes	Yes	Yes
Senior decision making	Managing challenging circumstances	Yes	Yes	Yes
Surgical Airway	Maintain Oxygenation	Yes	Yes	Yes
Thoracostomy	Tension pneumothorax management	Yes	Yes	Yes
Thoracotomy	Cardiac tamponade management	Yes	No	No
Ultrasound	Detection of major injury	Yes	Yes	Yes

== Personnel ==
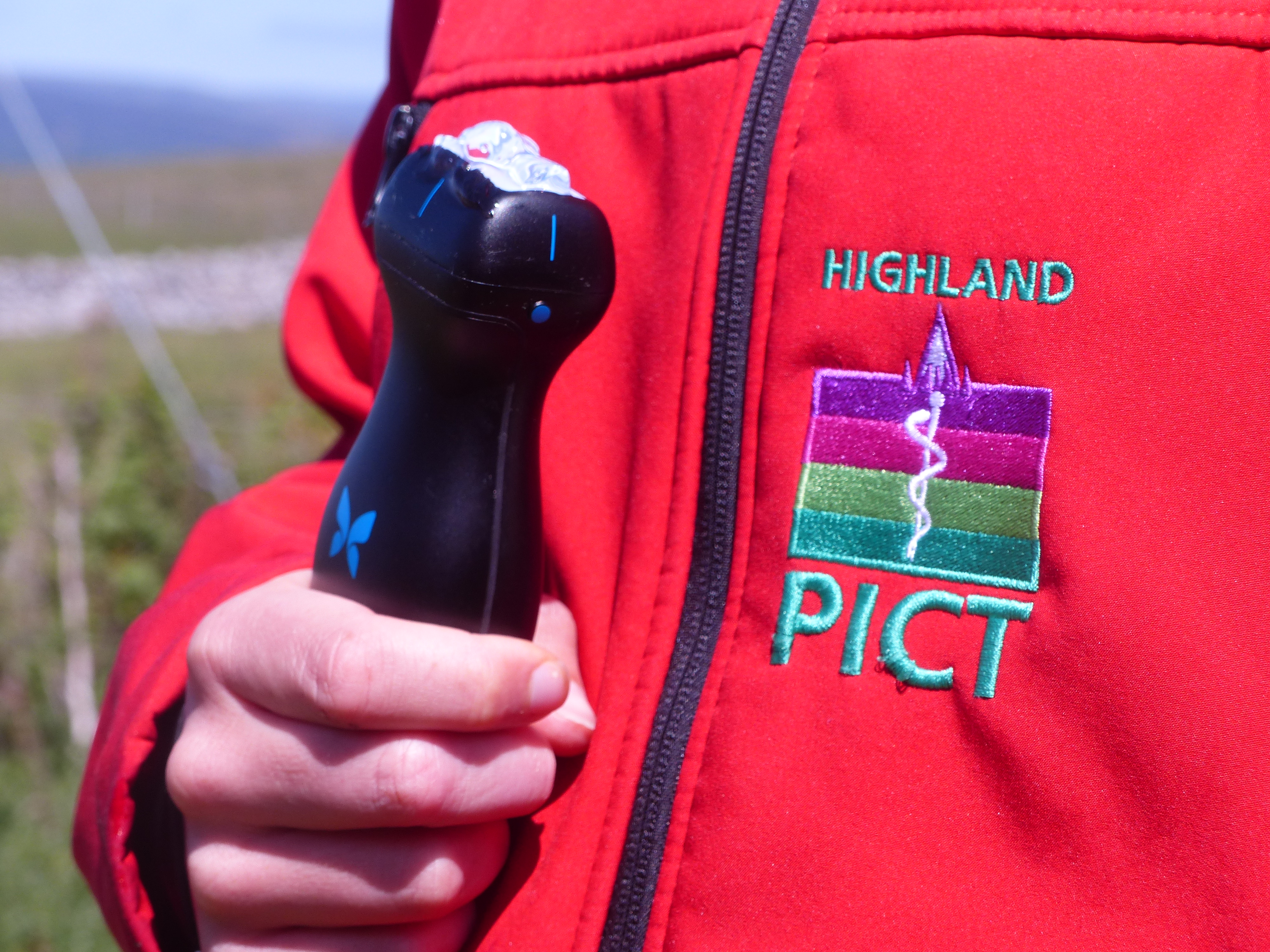
Portable ultrasound probe utilised by the Highland PICT Team

=== Doctors ===
The PICT doctors include consultants in the critical care aligned specialties of emergency medicine, intensive care medicine, acute medicine and anaesthesia. A number of the physicians are also GMC credentialed in Rural and Remote Medicine. In addition to this there are speciality doctors from anaesthesia and intensive care. There are also a number of rural General Practitioners with further training in prehospital emergency medicine who work as rural practitioners, emergency practitioners or rural GPs across the Highlands and Islands. The doctor on the PICT car will assume the role of the medical incident officer when required at a major incident. The clinical lead is Dr Luke Regan. Regan is a consultant in emergency medicine holding the diploma in retrieval and transfer medicine.

=== Advanced practitioners ===
The advanced practitioners in critical care (APCC) of the PICT Team are a cohort of clinicians from a paramedic or nursing parent specialty who are currently in training with PICT and in the emergency department at Raigmore Hospital.

This is an advanced practice role introduced with funding from the Scottish Trauma Network and represents a collaboration between the Highland PICT Team (NHS Highland) and the Scottish Ambulance Service. The role of the advanced practitioner in critical care is designed to support PICT doctors in managing trauma and medical emergencies, including undertaking the blue light (emergency) driving to attend these calls. The advanced practitioners all undertake a master's degree to fulfil this role. Once fully trained, they utilise critical care clinical competencies, and a number of primary care competencies to allow safe management of patients in the community or en route to hospital.

In 2022 one of the advanced practitioners was nominated for the Scottish Health awards for his role in the rescue of a 6 year old boy from a mountainside.

== 2022 PICT funding crisis ==
NHS Highland announced in early 2022 that they would defund the Inverness PICT Team, in steps which will leave the Highlands and Inverness without a seven-day physician-led enhanced care service. This led to the local MSP Sir Edward Mountain to campaign to save this prehospital resource from defunding.

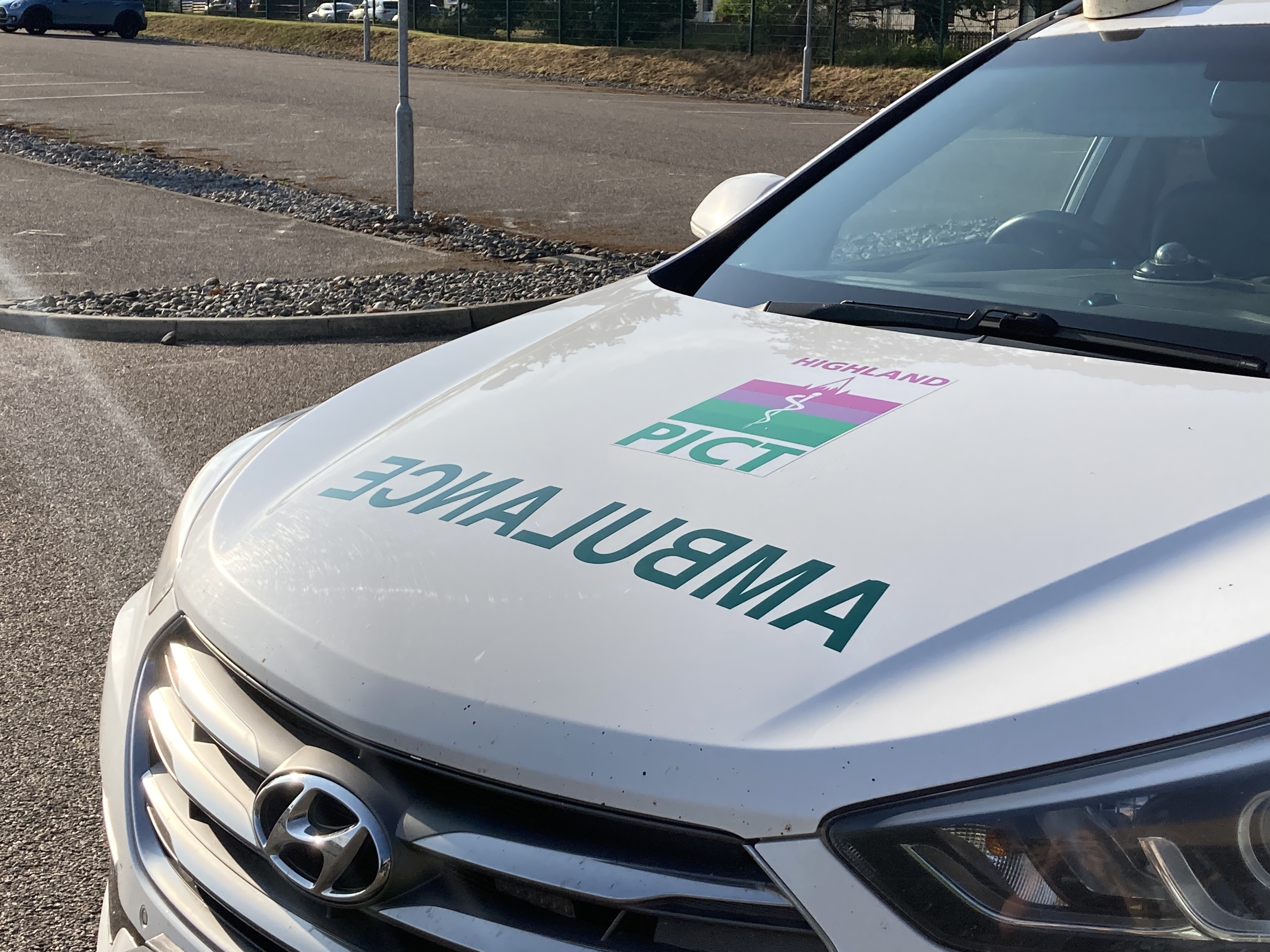
Scottish Ambulance Service Highland PICT response car

Mountain stated that:

"This pioneering service is essential when responding to major trauma incidents across the Highlands – we simply cannot afford to lose it."

In 2023 the PICT Team secured ongoing funding as was able to recruit a permanent cohort of physicians.

== Awards ==
=== Medic of the Year 2021 ===
In early 2022, Dr Luke Regan, the PICT Team clinical lead, was awarded "Medic of the Year 2021" by the College of Remote and Offshore Medicine and invited to join their Council of Members for his work relating to the provision of trauma care across the Highlands of Scotland.

=== Highland Heroes 2022 ===
In March 2022, the PICT Team was awarded Highland Hero Emergency Services Hero of the Year for their life-saving work across the Scottish highlands.

== See also ==
- Emergency Medical Retrieval Service
- Emergency medical services in the United Kingdom
- Air ambulances in the United Kingdom
