= Emergency Medical Retrieval Service =

- The crest of the EMRS
- Established: 2004
- Headquarters: Glasgow airport
- Budget: £2 million
- Website: www.emrsscotland.org

The Emergency Medical Retrieval Service (EMRS) is part of ScotSTAR retrieval service. The EMRS provides aeromedical critical care retrieval and pre-hospital care to people in Scotland in the form of two retrieval teams (North and West). The service provides patients in remote and rural areas with rapid access to the skills of a consultant or senior doctor in emergency medicine, intensive care medicine or anaesthesia, and facilitates transfers to larger, better equipped urban hospitals. The EMRS functions supplementary to the regular Scottish Ambulance Service Air Ambulance service. Unlike air ambulance services in other parts of the UK, EMRS has no dedicated aircraft but both EMRS North and West are funded by the Scottish Government. The EMRS has featured on the Channel 5 documentary series Highland Emergency, which charts the work of rescue services in the Scottish Highlands.

EMRS North team (in Aberdeen) is on base between 0800 and 1800, and EMRS West team (in Glasgow) are on base between 0700 and 2300, for immediate deployment; outside these hours the teams are on-call and will take at least 30 minutes longer to deploy.

Services are provided in partnership with the Scottish Ambulance Service utilising road transport, helicopters and fixed-wing aircraft. The EMRS operates as part of ScotSTAR, the Scottish national retrieval service, sharing a bespoke base at Glasgow Airport.

== History ==
EMRS locations

2004: The EMRS was formed in 2004 when NHS Argyll and Clyde approved a 12-month trial which involved 11 consultants in emergency or intensive care medicine. The EMRS was initially based at Glasgow City Heliport and operated only in the Argyll and Clyde area. During the first 12 months the EMRS attended 3 patients a month.

2007: In 2007, the service was extended to cover three rural general hospitals and 13 community hospitals as part of an 18-month trial funded with £1.59 million. The success of the service saw its operating zone expanded throughout the west coast of Scotland and the EMRS now operates from Stranraer in the south to Stornoway in the north. An independent service evaluation demonstrated value for money and lifesaving benefits of critical care retrieval.

2010: In March 2010, the Scottish Government acknowledged that due to its continuing success, the service would be further enhanced by the addition of a second team, operational from October 2010. The second team increased the number of participating consultants and doctors from eight to fifteen.

In 2010, around 90% of EMRS activity involved secondary retrieval. Annual running costs were now in the region of £2M. In 2011, annual activity was estimated to be 324 transfers each year with around 60% of these by rotary wing and 35% by fixed-wing aircraft.

2014: In June 2014, EMRS teams began to routinely carry a stock of O negative blood to allow transfusion earlier when responding to emergencies. During the period of the 2014 Commonwealth Games a third team of medics was available. As of December 2014, the staff of the service had expanded to include 27 part-time consultants and had completed more than 3,000 retrievals.

2015: In September 2015, the EMRS announced their move to a new purpose-built base, located at Glasgow Airport.

2019: A second EMRS base opened in Aberdeen, predominantly covering the North of Scotland.

== Transport Resources ==
The EMRS is supported by land ambulances, aircraft from the Scottish Ambulance Service's Air Ambulance Division, the Scottish Charity Air Ambulance and the helicopters of the UK Coastguard.

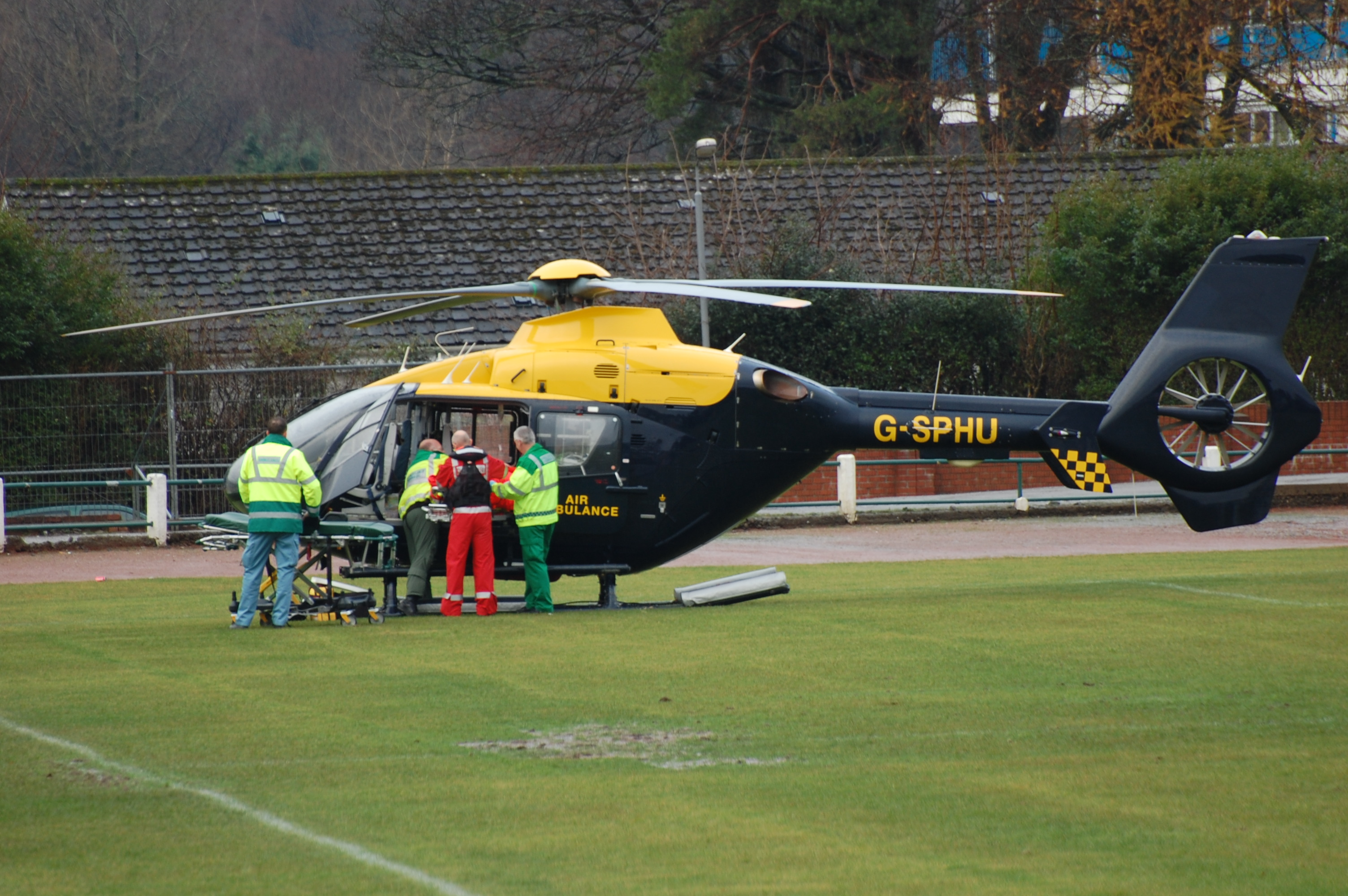
The EMRS team (red) with Paramedics (green) in 2009, loading a patient into a helicopter

== Personnel ==
EMRS Teams are composed of Retrieval Practitioners (Advanced or Specialist) and one or more doctors. Retrieval Practitioners come from a nursing or paramedic background and receive additional training in retrieval medicine. There are 47 part-time consultants who work with EMRS and a smaller number of registrar or clinical fellow grade doctors.

During staffing pressures in the early COVID-19 pandemic, the service occasionally deployed a Registrar with a Retrieval Practitioner as an operational team.

== Equipment ==
Collaboration with the Scottish National Blood Transfusion Service (SNBTS) allows the EMRS teams to have O-negative blood immediately available to take on all missions. The EMRS have developed a bespoke app to make their standard operating procedures available to clinicians. The team also carry equipment to facilitate the provision of anaesthesia and surgical interventions.

== Clinical Interventions ==
Pre-hospital Critical Care

The team attend between 1 and 3 prehospital patient a day, delivering advanced medical management and other critical care interventions many of these patients. In one study, 59.7% of patients received one of the following interventions; pre-hospital Blood transfusion, Chest drain insertion neuroprotective measures or Emergency ultrasound. In the same study 52.5% of patients were mechanically ventilated. In another study critical care interventions (emergency anaesthesia, thoracostomies, sedation, thoracotomy, chest drain insertion or administration of blood products) were provided to 17% of patients and 21% received an advanced medical intervention (these include patients who died on scene, gaining intraosseous access and any patient the team escorted to hospital).

The EMRS team perform prehospital anaesthesia as required, with a complication rate of 4%, and a first pass success rate of 80%. This is comparable to other UK prehospital services offering this intervention. EMRS are able to undertake surgical procedures at the road side, such as resuscitative thoracotomy, however EMRS does not have "specialist obstetric skills".

Retrieval and Transport

EMRS provide a retrieval service for adult patients across Scotland (paediatric retrieval is performed by ScotSTAR). EMRS' average (median) on-scene time with a patient requiring inter-hospital transport before transporting is one hour.

== Awards ==
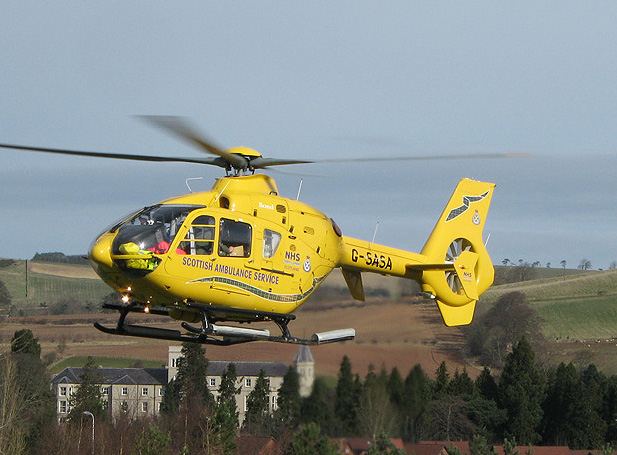
- Scottish Air Ambulance Helicopter
  In March 2010, EMRS won the Secondary Care Team of the Year category in the BMJ awards for its work in “transforming the care and transfer of seriously ill and injured patients in remote and rural Scotland”. This award recognised hospital teams that demonstrate improved outcomes of medical & surgical conditions.
- In 2012, the app developed by the EMRS won the EHI award for best use of mobile technology in healthcare and the NHS Scotland eHealth award for Best NHS Scotland use of Mobile technology.
- In 2023, the EMRS won the Military & Emergency Services Champion category at the Scotland's Champion's awards.

== See also ==
- Air ambulances in the United Kingdom
- BASICS Scotland
- Emergency medical services in the United Kingdom
- Highland PICT Team
