= Scotland's Charity Air Ambulance =

Scottish charity air ambulance

Scotland’s Charity Air Ambulance
- Founded: 26 October 2010
- Type: Charitable organisation
- Registration no.: Scotland SC384396; OSCR SC041845
- Headquarters: Perth Airport, Scone
- Region served: Scotland
- Aircraft operated: Eurocopter EC135; Airbus H145
- Revenue: £7.7 million (2024)
- Website: www.scaa.org.uk

Scotland's Charity Air Ambulance (SCAA) is a registered charity which assists the Scottish Ambulance Service (SAS) with emergency medical services through the provision of helicopter-based air ambulances.

SCAA air ambulances complement the state-funded aircraft that also operate across Scotland. A Eurocopter EC135 is based at Perth Airport, and an Airbus H145 operates from Aberdeen Airport. Both are crewed by one or two SAS paramedics who are tasked from the SAS ambulance control centre at Cardonald. As of May 2013, they have flown 5,200 missions.

Air ambulance bases in Scotland
Key: Ch=Charity AS=Ambulance Service

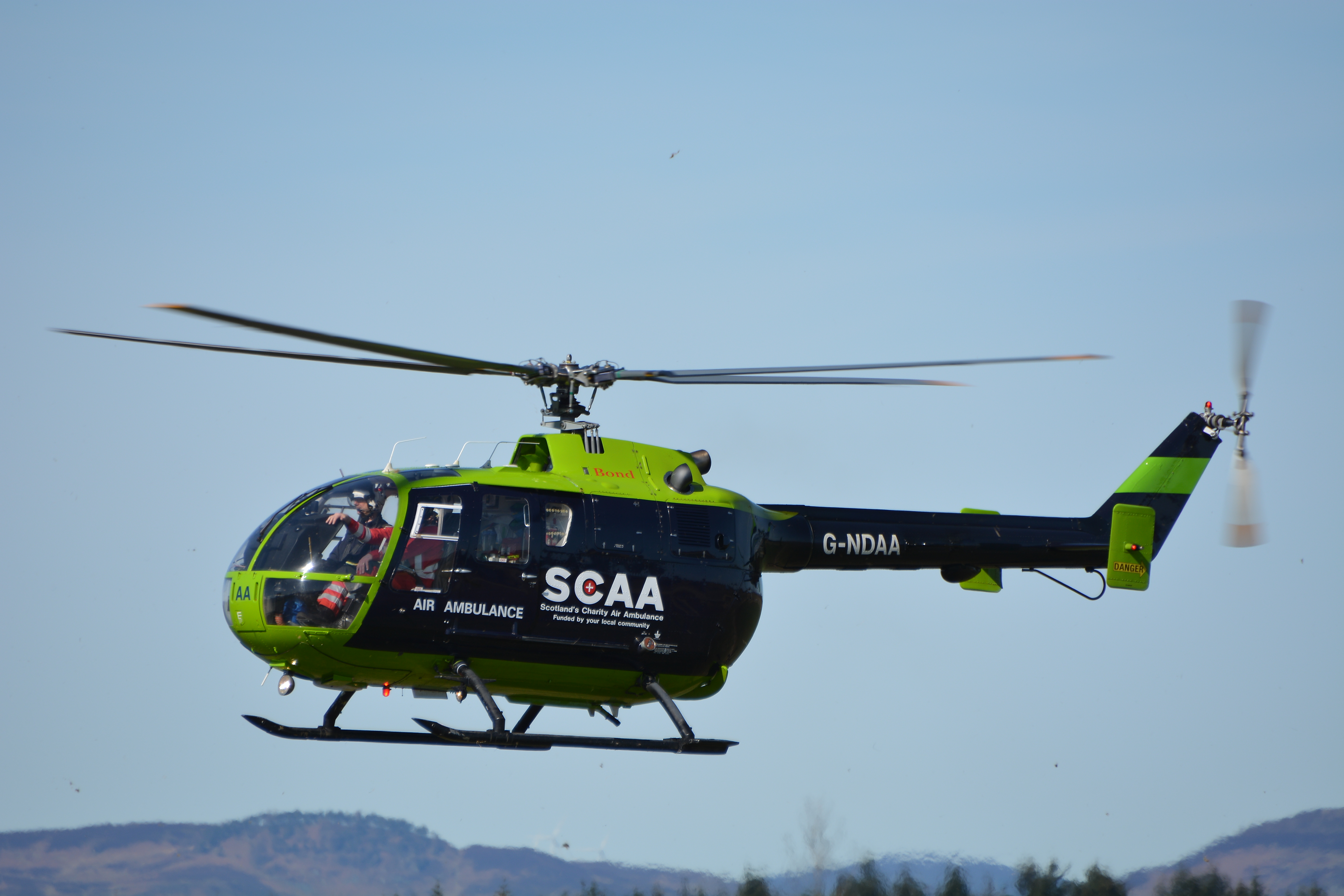
The charity's first helicopter - G-NDAA, a MBB Bo 105

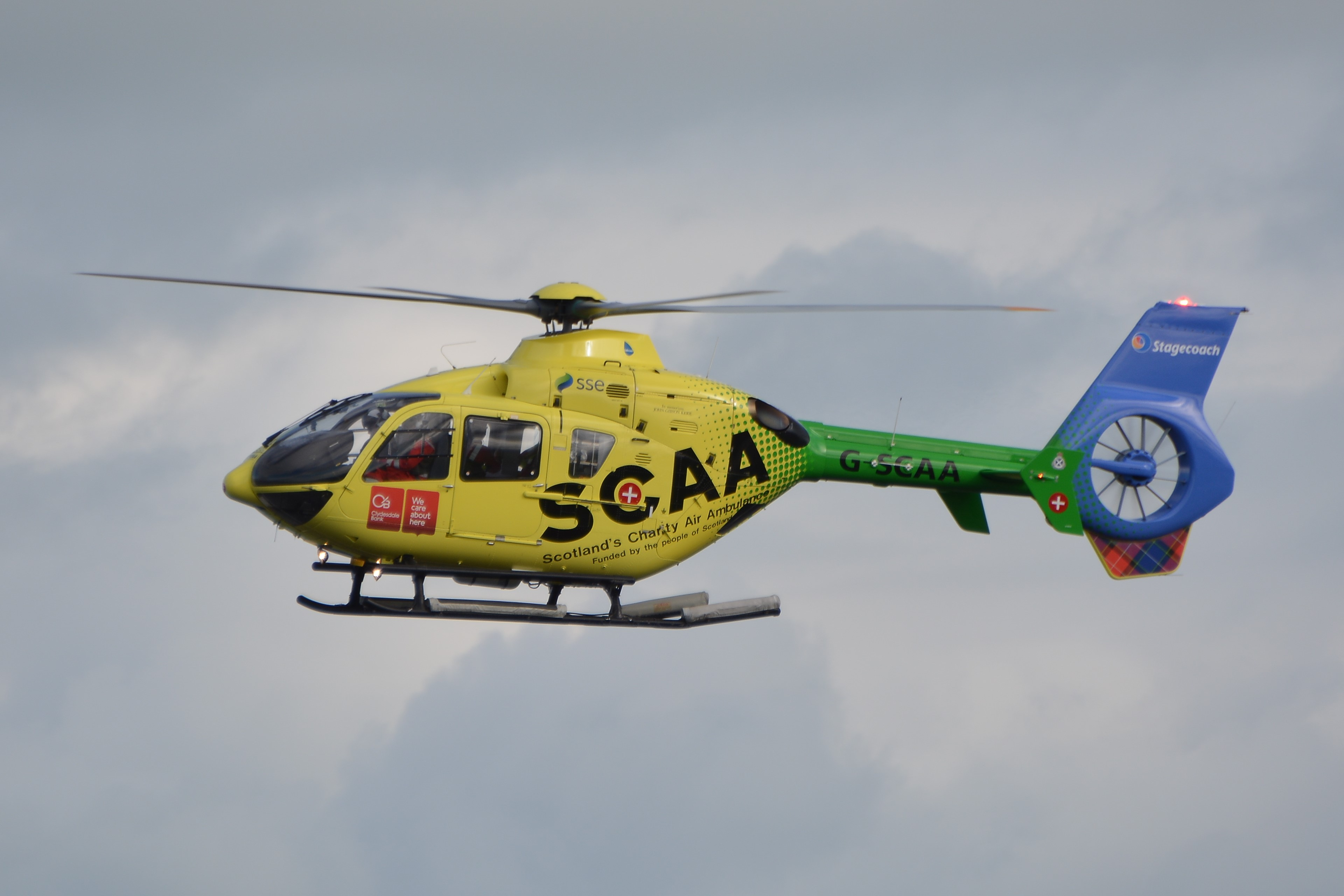
Scotland's Charity Air Ambulance - G-SCAA, an Airbus H135

== History ==
The organisation registered as a charity in Scotland in October 2010. In late 2012, SCAA was hoping to raise money from public and private donations in excess of £1.5 million every year. It commenced operations in May 2013, with a MBB Bo 105 airframe, registration G-NDAA, and flew 40 missions in the first month. After two months, the service changed the hours it operated, allowing deployment later in the day. This change was to make the ambulance available at times of high demand. By January 2014, the air ambulance had flown its 200th mission. In May 2014, after a year of operations they had completed nearly 300 missions. By February 2015, the ambulance had been despatched on almost 500 missions.

In March 2015, it was announced that the charity would receive £3.3M, allocated from Libor fines, which would allow the charity to replace their helicopter with a larger, more capable aircraft.

In October 2015, they upgraded to a Eurocopter EC135, which is faster and more powerful than the Bo 105. The new EC135, registered G-SCAA, previously operated for the NHS funded air ambulance in Scotland as G-SASB.

The charity reached 1,000 call-outs in March 2016.

Scotland's Charity Air Ambulance uses the radio call sign Helimed 76 for the Perth helicopter and Helimed 79 for the Aberdeen helicopter.

In April 2018, the charity announced that a drive was underway to raise £6M towards the running of a second helicopter for a three-year period. In November, they announced that this second aircraft would be based in Aberdeen and that they hoped that the service would be running by late 2019. A four-year contract was signed with Babcock Mission Critical Services Onshore in September 2019 for a Eurocopter EC135, callsign Helimed 79, to operate from Aberdeen International Airport from early 2020.

In the year ending March 2024, SCAA raised revenue of £7.7M, of which £4.8M was spent operating the air ambulance service.

Across 2021, SCAA deployed crews on 810 occasions and airlifted 333 people, with almost three quarters of these patients being flown to a major trauma centre.

In October 2025, following the success of the fundraising mission Operation Skyward, the charity announced that operations from Aberdeen Airport had been replaced by a new Airbus H145 D3 helicopter, G-NSCA. The new helicopter offers greater range and capacity over the previous EC135. It was also announced that the Perth base's EC135 T2i, G-SCAA, would be retired and replaced by an improved H135 T2e, G-PSCA.

== Awards ==
The service has been recognised with several awards for their role in Scotland’s emergency response network.

The pilots and paramedics were chosen as "Rural Heroes 2017" by the Scottish Rural Award in 2017.

The charity won the Health and Wellbeing Award at the Perthshire Chamber of Commerce Business Star Awards 2019.

SCAA paramedics John Pritchard, Richard Garside and Captain Shaun Rose were recognised as Emergency First Aid Heroes of the Year at the Scottish First Aid Awards in 2022, following a mission flying a patient who had a heart attack and several cardiac arrests to a hospital during a winter storm.

Captain Russell Myles, who helped establish the service and was the charity's longest service pilot, won the national Air Ambulances UK Awards of Excellence “Pilot of the Year” title in 2023. Myles retired in May 2024, having flown over 1,200 missions for the service.

The charity was awarded the Emergency Services award at the Pride of Scotland ceremony in 2023.

== See also ==
- Air ambulances in the United Kingdom
