= BASICS Scotland =

Scottish prehospital care organization

British Association for Immediate Care Scotland
- BASICS Scotland logo
- Formation: 1977 / 2002
- Type: Charitable organisation
- Legal status: Charity
- Headquarters: Aberruthven
- Region served: Scotland
- Chairperson: John Pritchard
- Vice Chairperson: Andrew Bayliss
- CEO: Lorna Duff
- Website: basics-scotland.org.uk

The British Association for Immediate Care Scotland (BASICS Scotland) is an organisation involved with prehospital care. It has the aims of providing encouragement and aid with the formation of immediate care schemes and to provide training to support those working in prehospital care. It shares its origins with the British Association for Immediate Care (BASICS), which has UK wide coverage. In 1993, the British Association for Immediate Care began running prehospital care courses in Scotland, which were met with a warm welcome and it became clear there was a large audience for such education, especially in remote and rural areas of Scotland. This need for training and organisational leadership became clearer after the 1994 Scotland RAF Chinook crash on the Mull of Kintyre. This led to the training provided by BASICS to be modified for a more rural setting, and to the development of BASICS Scotland as a separate organisation in 2002.

BASICS Scotland's charitable activities span two distinct areas in relation to prehospital care:

- Support of the voluntary responder network of doctors, nurses and paramedics who attend 999 emergency calls across Scotland and
- The innovation and provision of high-quality education in the field of prehospital and emergency medicine

== History ==
BASICS Scotland was originally formed as part of the British Association for Immediate Care, which was established in June 1977. Kenneth Easton, a General Practitioner, was the first chairman of the organisation. Initially it was formed from the existing schemes. The organisation then offered individual membership to doctors that had an interest in immediate care, such as those working in General Practice, Surgery, Medicine, Emergency Medicine, Anaesthesia and Critical Care. Associate membership was open to paramedics and nurses which later again changed to offering full membership recognising the changing roles of these professions.

In 1991, the organisation increased its involvement in educational activities, making available residential courses covering prehospital care and resuscitation. Since then BASICS Scotland has become fully independent from BASICS and has diversified its educational provision across Scotland.

=== Awards and honours ===
BASICS Scotland responders have received the Queen's Jubilee medals during the last three jubilee celebrations. A number of BASICS Scotland responders and board members have also received honours from Her Majesty the Queen. The MBE has been awarded in 2013 to John Pritchard, in 2015 to Duncan Tripp, in 2019 to Colville Laird, in 2022 to Dr Cole.

The charity itself has been awarded the Defence Employer Recognition Scheme Bronze and Silver Awards.

== Prehospital responding ==
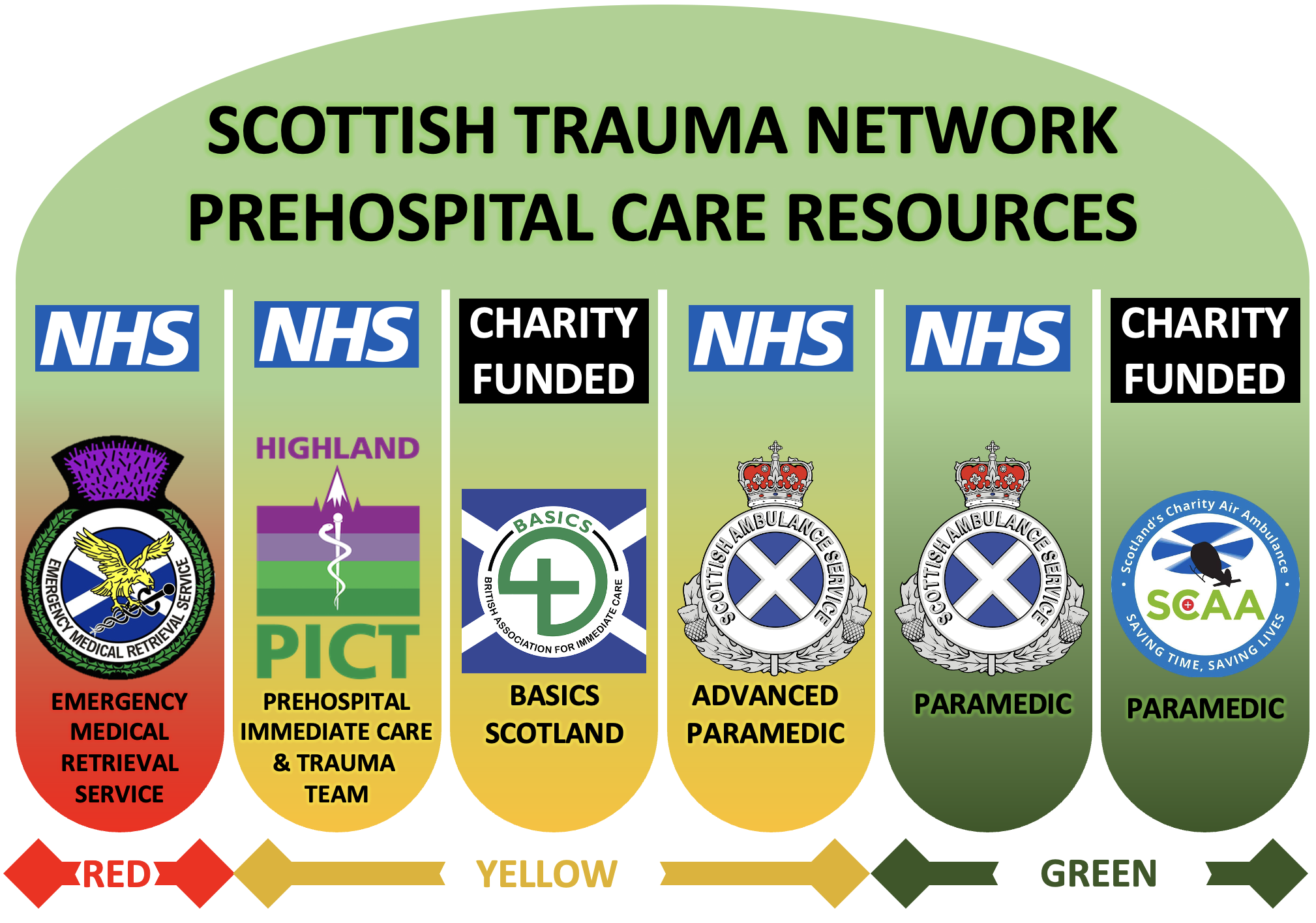
Scottish Trauma Network - prehospital resources

=== Prehospital volunteers ===
BASICS Scotland is an association of health care professionals, who undertake additional training as immediate care practitioners. The members provide their services in support of the statutory or voluntary ambulance services. These responders form part of the pre-hospital elements of the Scottish Trauma Network, in relation to this, they are considered Yellow Level responders, in relation to their scope of practice. BASICS Scotland in coordination with the Sandpiper Trust is also a keen promoter of first aid and emergency prehospital care.

BASICS Scotland responders, many of whom are general practitioners, are able to offer additional skills and resources to the other statutory and voluntary emergency services. Enhanced skills offered by BASICS Scotland responders may include:

- oral endotracheal intubation
- procedural sedation and advanced analgesia
- sedation after return of spontaneous circulation (ROSC)
- fascia iliaca block
- intraosseous access
- DC cardioversion of dysrhythmias
- thoracostomy and drain insertion

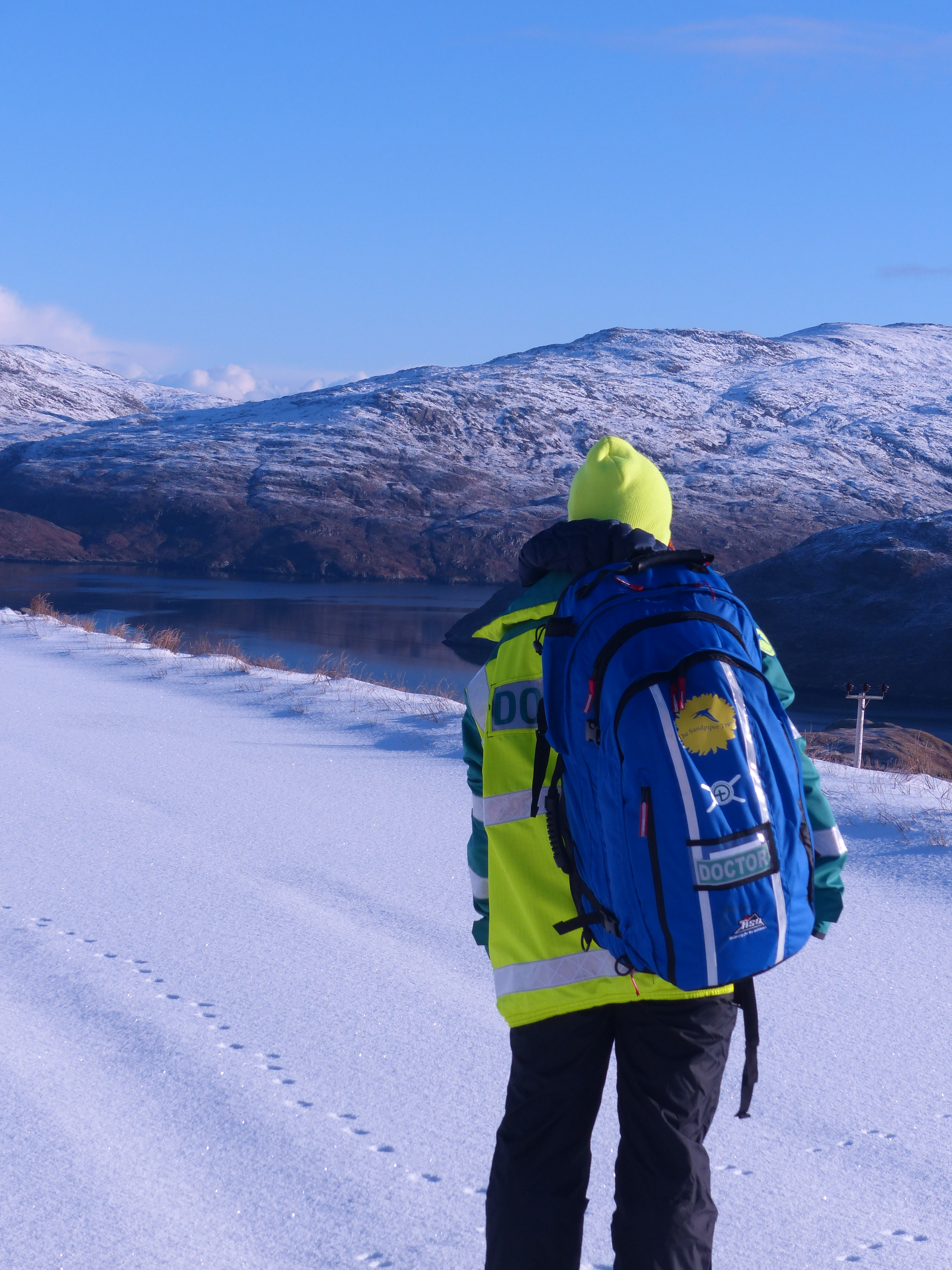
BASICS Scotland Doctor in the Hebrides, Scotland

BASICS Scotland responders are dispatched by the Scottish Ambulance Service control room, and many responders carry radios or telephones with tracking capabilities to allow control room staff to know when a responder is in close proximity to a 999 incident. These responders are integrated into the pan-Scotland trauma network. Responders who are medical doctors on the General Medical Council register may use emergency green beacons on their car to alert other road users intentions (although such lights do not provide exemptions from road traffic law).

BASICS Scotland responders have been present at many serious incidents across Scotland for many years, including:

- Bus crashes and other traffic collisions
- Mountain rescue incidents

=== PICT Team ===
BASICS Scotland also provided initial support to the Highland PICT Team, a prehospital enhanced care team working in the North of Scotland. This resource, described as "world class" by a professor of Rural Health provides a physician and advanced practitioner team which responds to major trauma and medical illness across North Scotland. In light of the "sparsely distributed ambulance resources in the Highlands" and the challenges of distance and adverse weather in the North West of Scotland which hampers aeromedical activities, PICT has a considerable remit beyond major trauma.

PICT provides support to ambulance crews and community responders in medical emergencies, and also provides a "see and treat" service to patients in order to prevent transport and possible hospital admission for problems manageable at home. In this way PICT acts as a senior decision maker for prehospital clinicians across the North of Scotland. The role of the advanced practitioner is to support PICT clinicians in managing trauma and medical emergencies, including blue light driving to attend these calls. ARPs are rostered on duty with PICT, but also respond as an advanced paramedic response car outside the hours of PICT operation. This response provides additional backup to local cardiac arrest incidents, major trauma and other complex emergencies.

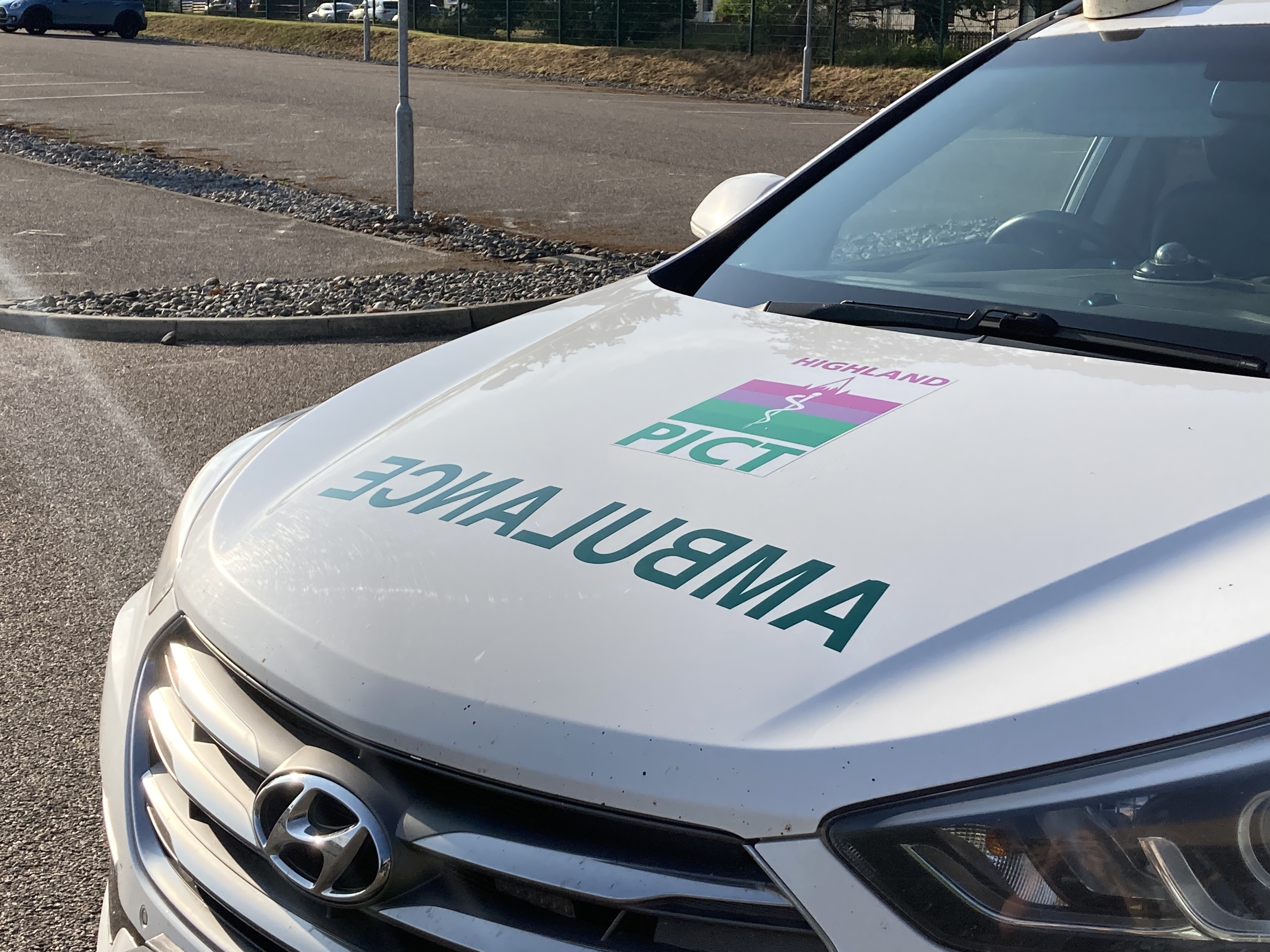
Response car used by the PICT Team

The PICT Team currently operates 12 hours per day, and provides a seven-day service year round. Providing a variety of enhanced care services such as pre-hospital ultrasound, cardioversion, sedation and prehospital amputation. The doctor on the PICT Care will also assume the role of the Medical Incident Officer when required at a major incident.

==== PICT funding crisis ====
In 2022, NHS Highland announced they would defund the PICT Team, in steps which will leave the Highlands and Inverness without a seven-day physician-led enhanced care service. The nearest similar service being over 100 miles drive away in Aberdeen in the form of Emergency Medical Retrieval Service, although that service is primarily for medical retrieval work, rather than responding to 999 calls and providing community medicine to facilitate admission avoidance.

== COP26 International Conference ==
=== COP26 Medical Centre ===
In 2021, BASICS Scotland and the Scottish Ambulance Service ran a medical centre for attendees at the 2021 United Nations Climate Change Conference (COP26) in Glasgow, during October and November 2021.

BASICS Scotland provided doctors, nurses and paramedics to staff the medical centre. The medical centre provided medical care to attendees within the central Blue Zone of the conference. These included advanced nurse practitioners in primary care, a consultant in sports and exercise medicine, general practitioners and critical care doctors.

The medical centre was successful at managing a high percentage of patients at the conference and avoiding unnecessary burdens on surrounding NHS services. Around half of all patients seen had a musculoskeletal problem, many of which were discharged on scene. National Clinical Director of the Scottish Government Jason Leitch and Cabinet Secretary for Health and Social Care Humza Yousaf both visited the BASICS Scotland staff at the medical centre during the COP26 conference.

== Educational activity ==
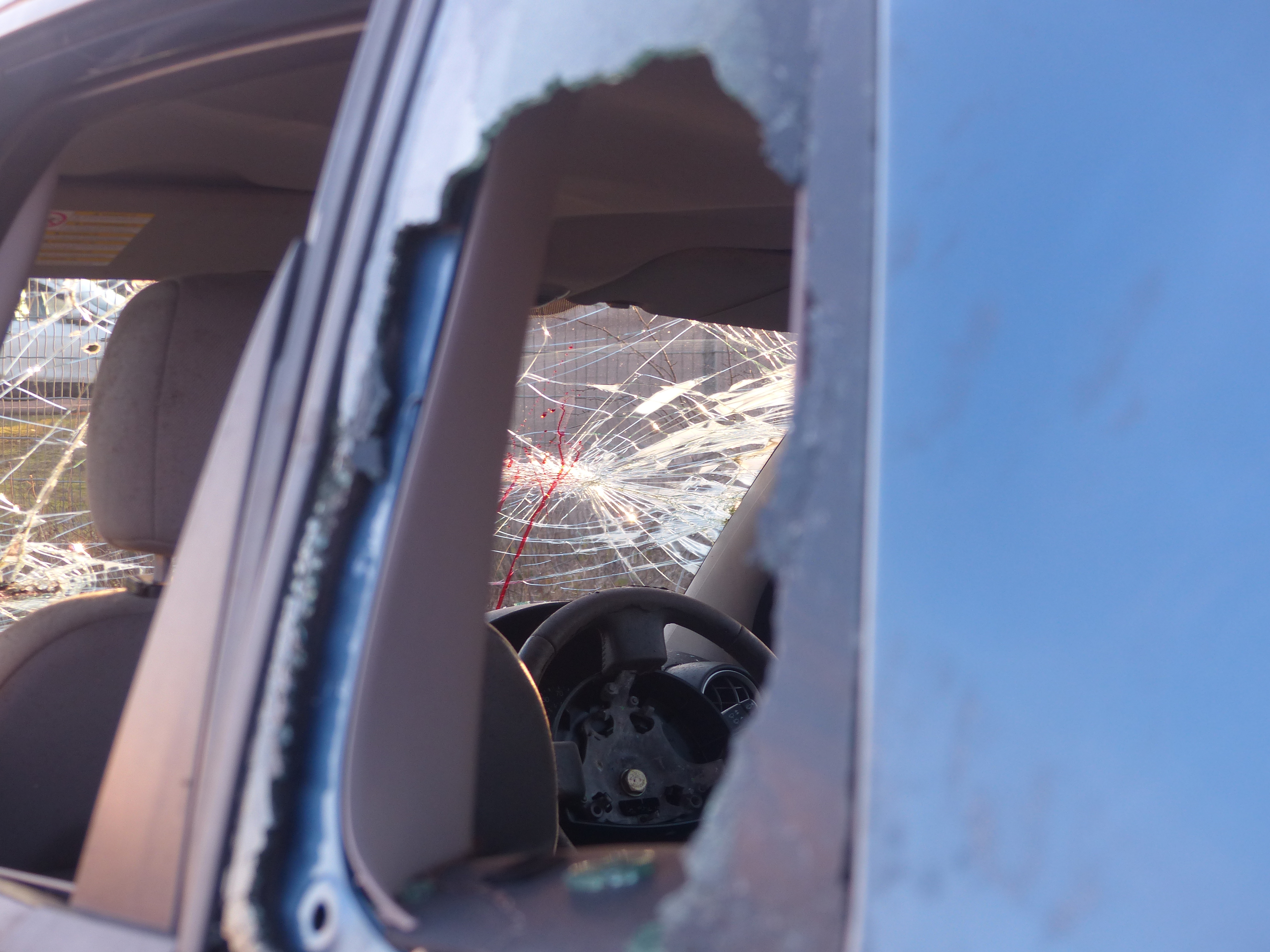
Bullseye damage to windscreen during a simulation scenario

BASICS Scotland provides a number of face-to-face and online courses as well as annual conferences. It also has a voice at national level and direct involvement with the work of the Royal College of Surgeons in relation to their Faculty of Prehospital Care. Training provided by the organisation has also included the use of a simulation vehicle to practice extrication of casualties who have been involved in a car crash. The organisations has also delivered bespoke training courses, to audiences such as dental practitioners, individual GP practices, occupational health doctors and nurses, Custody doctors and immigration centre health practitioners. They have also been involved in public health messages related to acute illness and injury. The charity has also worked on developing innovative augmented reality learning resources for teaching prehospital care.

=== Conferences ===
BASICS Scotland holds annual conferences covering a range of topics of interest to those involved in prehospital and rural emergency care. These conferences are usually held in Aviemore, Scotland. In light of the COVID global pandemic, the 2021 conference was held online, focusing on hypothermia.

Conference themes:

- 2014 - Legal Highs
- 2015 - Back to Basics
- 2016 - The Evidence, The Practice
- 2017 - Cardiac Arrest: It Takes a System to Save a Life
- 2018 - Prehospital Care: Across the Generations
- 2019 - Prehospital Trauma
- 2021 - Hypothermia (virtual conference)
- 2022 - Challenging Scenes and Situations (virtual conference)
- 2022 - Working Together for Rural Scotland
- 2023 - Common but Complex Cases
- 2024 - Remote and Rural Resilience
- 2025 - Making the Unpredictable Predictable

=== Courses ===
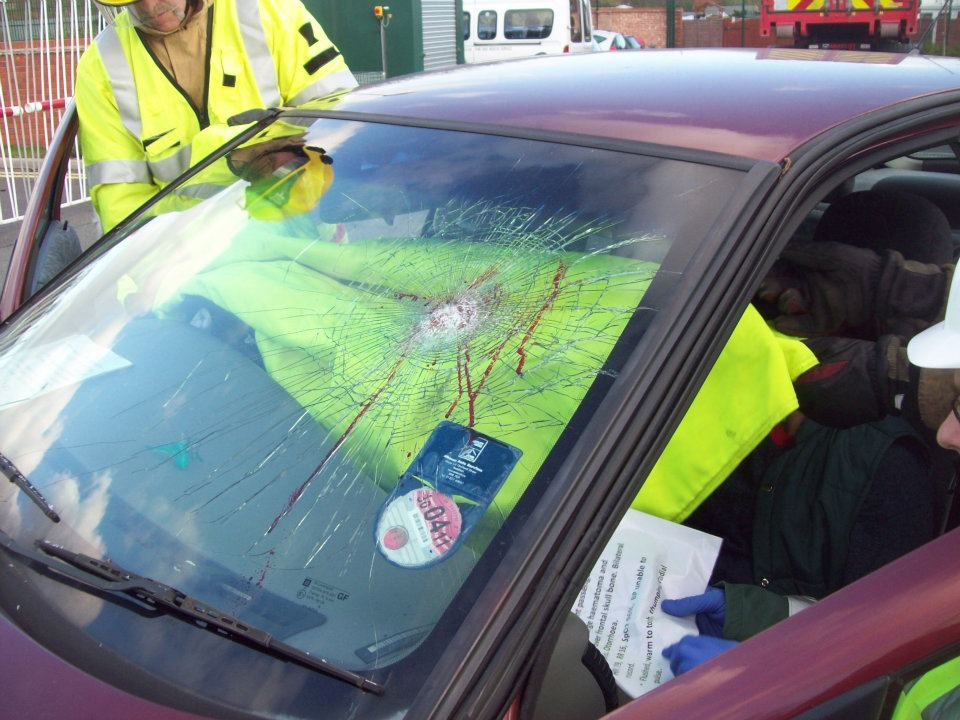
Simulated road traffic collision training

BASICS Scotland run a number of courses:

- Prehospital Emergency Care Course (PhEC): The material covered and assessed is based on the Royal College of Surgeons of Edinburgh material from the "Foundation Material For Prehospital Care" manual from the Faculty of Pre-Hospital Care. The course is open to doctors, nurses and paramedics.
- PHPLS: The Prehospital Paediatric Life Support course is accredited by the ALSG. It aims to provide the knowledge and practical procedures necessary for assessment and effective treatment of childhood emergencies prior to hospital admission.
- Generic Instructor Course (GIC)
- Custody Suite Training
- Major Incident Medical Management (MIMMS)
- Hospital MIMMS
- Tele-Education
- Remote Skills
- Portfolio Project

=== Podcasts ===
The organisation also produced a suite of podcasts, which have included various guest speakers form other emergency services (such as Police Scotland and HM Coastguard). These have covered a wide range of topics such as traumatic and paediatric cardiac arrest management, forensic considerations for responders, analgesia and prolonged field care.

=== Medical students ===
BASICS Scotland aims to undertake annual teaching for medical students; having previously taught students from Dundee University, University of St Andrews and University of Central Lancashire. In 2022 a University of Aberdeen medical student worked with BASICS Scotland to produce an academic poster at the EMS2022 conference.

== Sandpiper Trust role ==
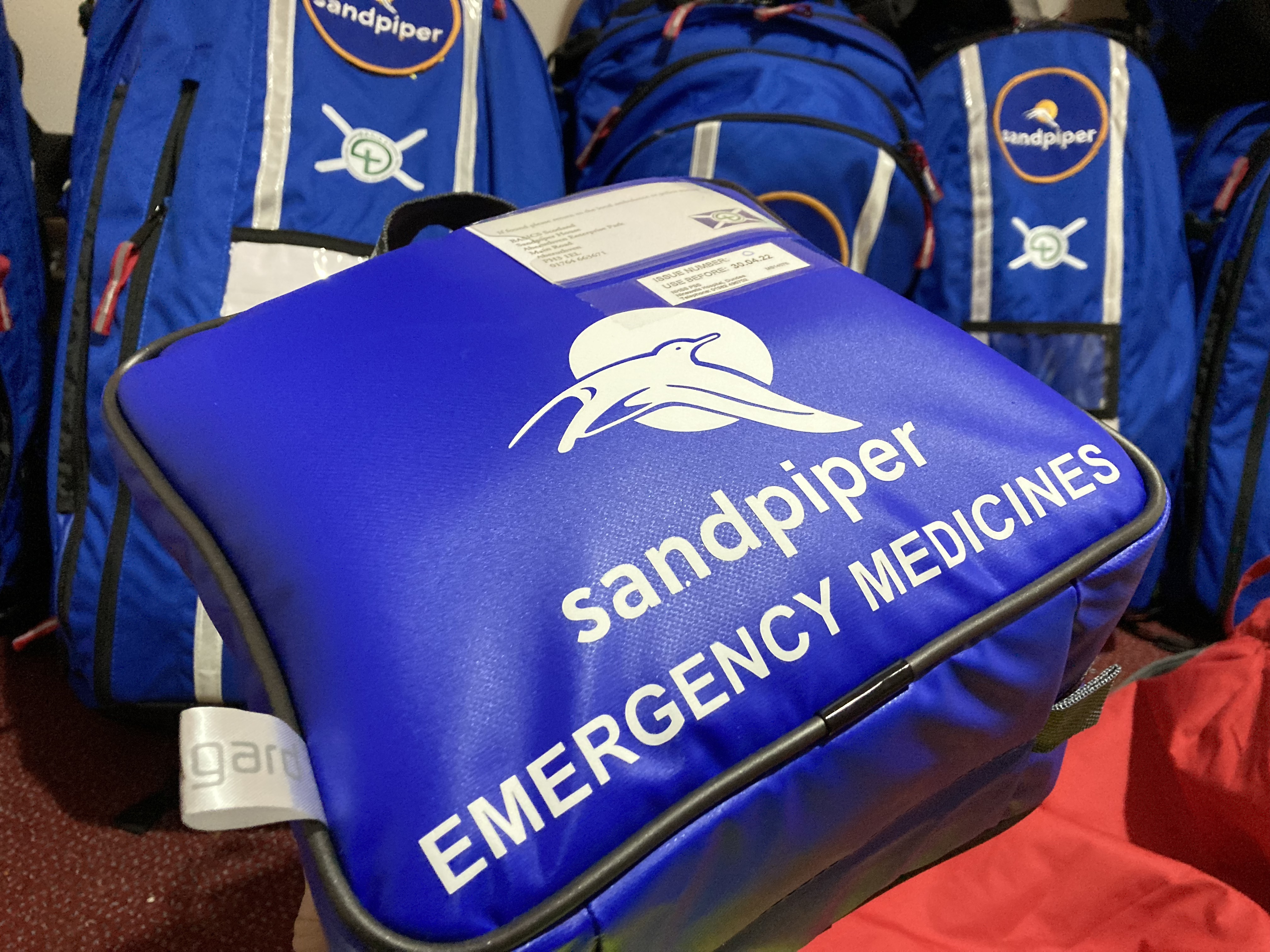
Sandpiper Emergency Medicines Pouch with Sandpiper Bags in the background

Sandpiper Trust is a charity formed to provide remote and rural medical (and paramedical) practitioners with equipment that would allow them to safely provide high quality immediate care at the scene of an illness or accident. The organisation has also supported leaps forwards in prehospital care in Scotland.

=== Sandpiper Bag ===
An early benefit of this organisation was the bespoke design of the Sandpiper Bag specifically for rural prehospital care. The Sandpiper Bag is now the recognised standard pre-hospital care equipment in Scotland and is used extensively on the BASICS Scotland courses. It is also the being used on the prehospital Diploma examinations by the Faculty of Prehospital Care, Royal College of Surgeons of Edinburgh. Sandpiper Bags have also made their way to Australia with the development of Sandpiper Australia.

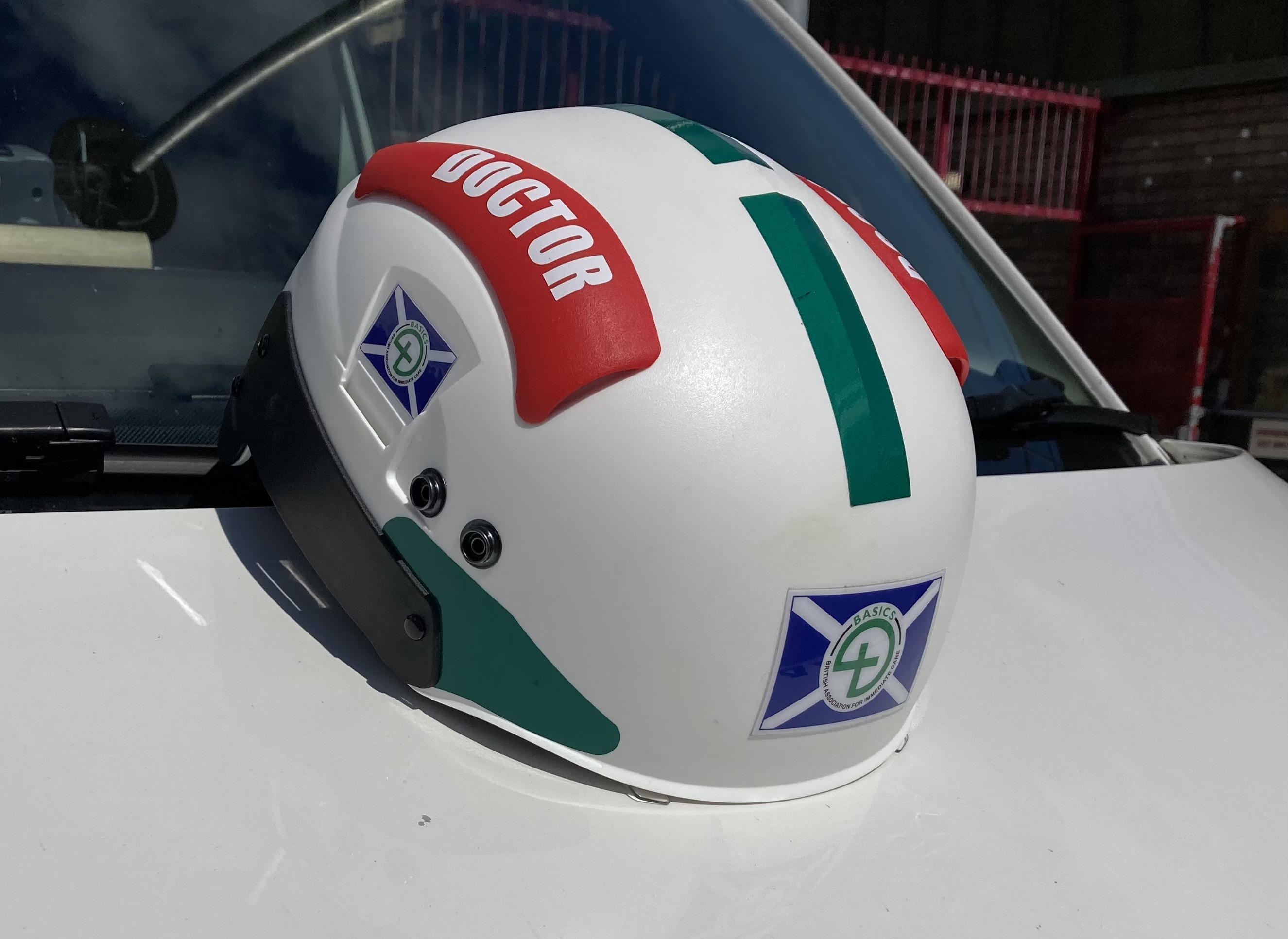
The BASICS Scotland responder helmet

=== Sandpiper emergency medicines pouch ===
Sandpiper Trust has also supplied emergency medication pouches to prehospital volunteer responders. These pouches are made of hardwearing, wipe clean material and contain essential lifesaving medications, allowing responders to undertake effective prehospital care across rural Scotland.

=== Helmets ===
The Sandpiper Trust facilitated the provision of responders helmets, suitable for multi-modality rescue operations.

== Notable individuals ==
Throughout the history of BASICS Scotland there have been a number of individuals, who have been specifically notable for their contributions to prehospital care in Scotland.

- Dr Hugh Macdonald Baird — Dr Baird was chairman of BASICS Scotland in 1978, prior to this he founded the first immediate care scheme in Scotland in 1974, the West Galloway Voluntary Accident Service, and in 1977 he became the founding vice chair of the British Association for Immediate Care Schemes (BASICS). Dr Baird died in 2012.
- Dr Mark Bloch — Dr Bloch was an enthusiastic anaesthetist and prehospital physician. He was a board member for BASICS Scotland as well as an active instructor and responder. Dr Bloch died in 2014.
- Prof Colville Laird MBE — Founder and later medical director of BASICS Scotland until 2018. He is an expert in prehospital care, particularly in relation to rural Scotland and major incident management.
- Dr Richard Price — Clinical director, retrieval physician and consultant in anaesthesia and intensive care.
- Mr Duncan Tripp MBE — Winchman paramedic, board of directors.
- Dr Luke Regan — Clinical Lead PICT Team.
- Mr John Pritchard MBE — Area service manager, paramedic, board of directors.
- Dr Kirsty Cole MBE — BASICS Scotland responder and instructor, Orkney.

== See also ==
- Air ambulances in the United Kingdom
- Ambulance services in the United Kingdom
- NHS 24
- Scottish Fire and Rescue Service
