= Perth Airport (Scotland) =

Airport in Scone, Scotland

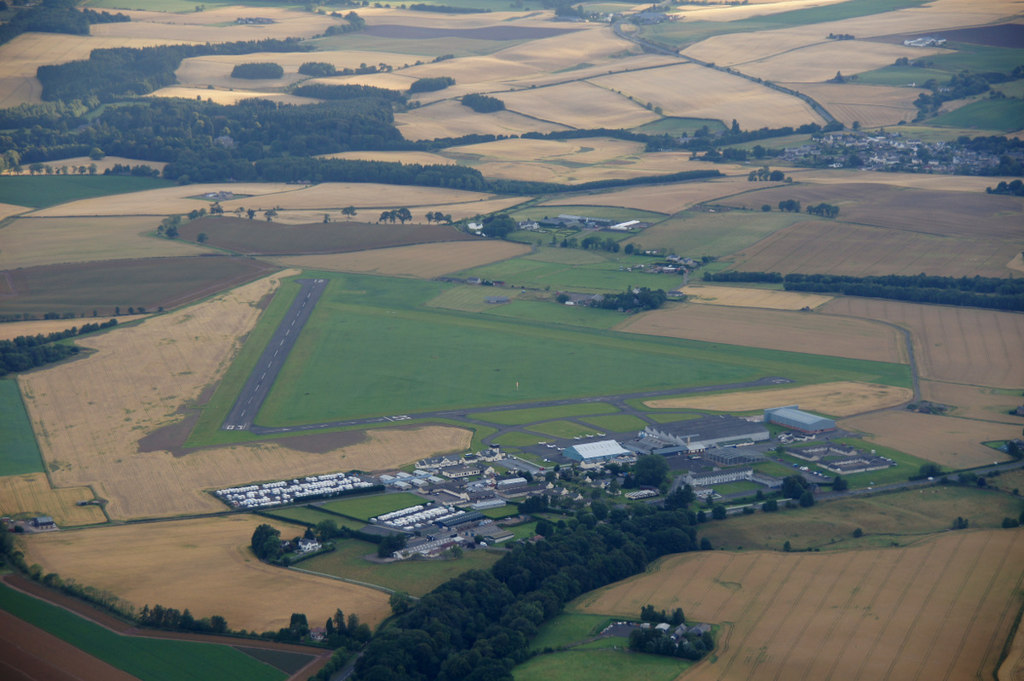
- Perth Airport from the air, looking northeast to Coupar Angus. The runways in view are (clockwise from left): 03/21, 15/33 and 09/27
- IATA: PSL; ICAO: EGPT

Summary
- Airport type: Public
- Owner: Morris Leslie Ltd
- Operator: ACS Aviation Ltd
- Serves: Perth, Scotland
- Elevation AMSL: 395 ft (120 m)
- Coordinates: 56°26′28″N 003°22′26″W
- Website: www.perthairport.co.uk/

Map
- Location in Perth and Kinross

Runways
Direction	Length		Surface
Direction	m	ft	Surface
03/21	853	2,799	Asphalt
09/27	609	1,998	Asphalt
15/33	622	2,041	Grass
- Sources: UK AIP at NATS

Perth Airport (IATA: PSL, ICAO: EGPT) is a general-aviation airport located at New Scone, 3 miles (6 km) northeast of Perth, Scotland. The airport is used by private and business aircraft, and for pilot training. There are no commercial scheduled flights from the airport.

Perth Aerodrome has a CAA Ordinary Licence (Number P823) that allows flights for the public transport of passengers or for flying instruction as authorised by the licensee, Morris Leslie Limited.

The airport is operated daily from 09:00 to 17:00 by ACS Aviation Ltd.

== History ==
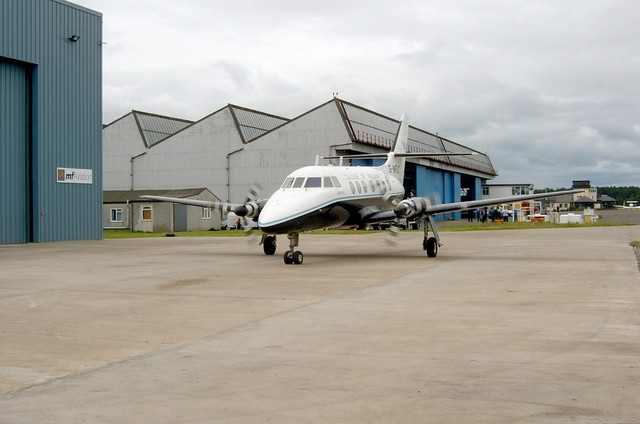
A British Aerospace Jetstream arrives to be used as an instructional airframe by AST. In the background is the original hangar 1, which dates back to the 1930s.

The airport opened in 1936 as Scone Aerodrome. A flight training school, training military pilots, was established shortly after the airport was opened.

Immediately after the start of World War II, researchers working on aircraft-mounted radars were stationed at Scone for a brief period, fitting their radar systems to various aircraft. The site was unsuitable for such work, and the team moved to a new site in Wales in November. During the war, No. 309 Polish Fighter-Reconnaissance Squadron and No. 666 Squadron RAF used the aerodrome, then known as RAF (Royal Air Force) Scone.

The following units were also here at some point:

- No. 1 Civilian Fighter Control Co-operation Unit RAF
- No. 5 Flying Instructors School RAF
- No. 5 Flying Instructors School (Elementary) RAF
- No. 5 Flying Instructors School (Supplementary) RAF
- No. 6 Anti-Aircraft Co-operation Unit RAF
- No. 7 Anti-Aircraft Co-operation Unit RAF
- No. 7 Air Observers Navigation School RAF
- No. 7 Civil Air Navigation School RAF
- No. 9 Gliding School RAF
- No. 11 Elementary and Reserve Flying Training School RAF
- No. 11 Elementary Flying Training School RAF
- No. 11 Reserve Flying School RAF
- No. 12 Air Experience Flight RAF
- No. 1966 Reserve Air Observation Post Flight RAF
- No. 1967 Reserve Air Observation Post Flight RAF
- No. 2821 Squadron RAF Regiment
- Experimental Flight
- Glasgow University Air Squadron
- Universities of Glasgow and Strathclyde Air Squadron
- Wireless Development Flight

The only scheduled commercial flights operated briefly from Perth were a British Airways service to Stavanger in Norway at the beginning of the Second World War, and a post-war BEA service to Glasgow's Renfrew airport. The airport was subsequently bought by Airwork Services, which continued the long tradition of pilot training at Perth.

By 1960 Airwork acquired Air Service Training (AST), an engineering training school, which it relocated from the south of England to the airport. The whole operation took on the AST name. AST gained a worldwide reputation for aviation training, being known as Britain's Air University. Students of more than 100 countries have been trained at Perth. Following a worldwide downturn in aviation, AST pulled out of pilot training in 1996. A year later the site was bought by Morris Leslie Ltd.

Perth Airport remains Scotland's main airport for general aviation and is the base of the Scottish Aero Club, which was founded in 1927. The airport is home to ACS Aviation Ltd, which provides private and commercial flight training, also on site is an aircraft maintenance company, ACS Engineering and numerous other non-aviation-related businesses.

AST, which is now part of Perth College, retains a presence at the airport and continues to offer aeronautical engineering courses. In 2011, AST announced a return to airline pilot training.

Scotland's Charity Air Ambulance (SCAA) was formed in 2012 and launched a helicopter air ambulance in May 2013 to assist the Scottish Air Ambulance Service (SAAS) to deliver front-line care to time-critical emergencies across Scotland. SCAA provides a fully equipped medical helicopter that can be deployed from its central base at Perth Airport to incidents across the length and breadth of Scotland.

In February 2019, the airport was reported to be looking into the possibility of attracting low-cost carriers such as Easyjet and Ryanair for scheduled passenger flights, though ACS Aviation subsequently denied having any such plans. Perth does not have the approach procedures required and its longest runway, at 853 metres (2,799 ft) in length, is not long enough to accommodate commercial jet aircraft, which typically require a minimum of 1700m in order to land and take off.

== Runways ==
The airport's runways are:

Direction	Length (metres / feet)	Surface
03/21	853 / 2,799	Asphalt
09/27	609 / 1,998	Asphalt
15/33	622 / 2,041	Grass

Due to the airport's terrain, aircraft on the threshold of runway 21 are out of sight to aircraft on runway 09/27.

=== Lighting ===
The airport is licensed for night take-offs and landings on runway 03/21. Out-of-hours airport use is strictly Prior Permission Required (PPR).

The lighting is to scale L4 and includes:

- Variable Intensity Precision Approach Path Indicator lighting (VI PAPI)
- Variable Intensity runway edge (white), threshold (green) and end (red) lighting
- Taxiway Bravo exiting towards the start/end of runway 09 has fixed green taxiway centreline lighting
- Stopway lighting
- Obstacle lighting

There is no approach lighting or aerodrome beacon. Pilot-operated lighting is available for out-of-hours use. Five clicks within five seconds on frequency 119.80 turns on the PAPI lights for ten minutes. An additional five clicks resets the timer to zero. This feature is not available for taxiway lights.

== Standard operating procedures ==
The Aerodrome Traffic Zone (ATZ) is notified active 0900 – 1700z in winter, 0800 – 1600Z in summer, and at other times by NOTAM. Perth Radio station (122.080 MHz) is usually staffed when the ATZ is active. Its communications are air/ground; it does not give instructions or clearances.

=== Obstacles ===
There is a line of hills running northeast–southwest to the east and south of the airport at a distance of 1.5 nm at its closest point. There are two significant peaks – Kingseat, 839 feet Above Aerodrome Elevation (AAL) (1236 feet Above Mean Sea Level (AMSL)), range 5 nm, bearing 058 degrees; and Murrayshall Hill, 521 feet AAL (918 feet AMSL), range 9,480 feet (2,890 m), bearing 160 degrees.

There are the following obstacles relative to the following runways:

- Runway 15: trees and buildings across climb path, height 15 feet AAL (450 feet AMSL)
- Runway 21: trees 164 feet right of climb path, height 53 feet AAL (450 feet AMSL)
- Runway 27: trees crossing climb-out path, height 60 feet AAL (457 feet AMSL)

=== Circuits ===
The published circuit directions are left-hand for runways 03, 09, 15 and right-hand 21, 27, 33. Circuit height is 1,000 feet AAL (1,400 feet AMSL).

=== Reporting points ===
The standard ATZ reporting points are Perth Racecourse (at Scone), Stanley, Coupar Angus, Newburgh and Bridge of Earn.

== Airspace ==
The airport is in the Scottish Centre (EGPX0839) area control centre.

While Dundee Airport is 7.5 nautical miles (13.9 km; 8.6 mi) away, to the east, its category C instrument approach for runway 09 encroaches the Perth Airport ATZ at 1,800 feet AAL. This procedure is used by Dundee commercial and training traffic irrespective of the runway in use. In an easterly wind, traffic may come as far west as the Perth overhead.

Jet aircraft regularly operate in the vicinity the airport due to its proximity to the former RAF Leuchars, 17 nautical miles (31 km; 20 mi) to the southeast. They can fly as low as 250 feet AAL.

== Navigation ==
The DVOR "PTH" is located immediately to the east of the runway 15 threshold. Its frequency is 110.40 MHz and has a range of 130 nautical miles (240 km; 150 mi), with a calibrated declination of 3° west. The waypoint "PTH" is also in the vicinity, part of the UP600 jet airway. It has a magnetic declination of 1.8° west.
