= SAR =

SAR or Sar may refer to:

== Places ==
- Sar (river), Galicia, Spain
- Sar, Bahrain, a residential district
- Sar, Iran (disambiguation), several places in Iran
- Sar, Tibet, Tibet Autonomous Region of China
- Šar Mountains, in southeastern Europe
- Sark, a Channel Island, IIGA country code
- Special administrative regions of China (Hong Kong and Macau)
- Syrian Arab Republic, sometimes abbreviated as SAR, the official name of Syria

== Business and finance ==
- Parabolic SAR (stop and reverse), a method of technical stock analysis
- Saudi Arabian riyal, currency code SAR
- Stock appreciation right, an employee reward

== Computing ==
- sar (Unix) (system activity report), a Unix/Linux performance report utility
- Segmentation and reassembly, in data networks
- Service Archive or SAR, a file format related to JAR
- Shift Arithmetically Right (SAR), an x86 instruction
- Storage Aspect Ratio of a digital image

== Law enforcement ==
- Search and rescue
- Nationwide Suspicious Activity Reporting Initiative, US
- Suspicious activity report, by a financial institution to an authority

== Science ==
=== Medicine, psychology, and biology ===
- SAR (clade) (Stramenopiles, Alveolates, and Rhizarians supergroup), a clade within the eukaryotes
- Scaffold/matrix attachment region or scaffold-attachment region, DNA sequences
- Sexual Attitude Reassessment
- Specific absorption rate, of RF energy by the human body
- Structure–activity relationship, of biological effect of a molecule
- Systemic acquired resistance, of a plant to a pathogen

=== Science and technology ===
- Sar (astronomy), 9 years 5 days, a period separating eclipses or half a saros
- SAR 21, Singapore Assault Rifle – 21st century
- SAR-87 (Sterling SAR-87), 1980s military assault rifle
- IPCC Second Assessment Report, 1995 report on climate change
- Semi-automatic rifle
- Sodium adsorption ratio, an irrigation water quality parameter
- Spent Acid Regeneration of sulfuric acid
- Submarine Advanced Reactor program of USS Triton
- Successive Approximation Register of a successive-approximation ADC
- Synthetic-aperture radar, imaging radar

== Organizations ==
- SAR Academy, yeshiva in Riverdale, New York, US
  - SAR High School, the high school of SAR Academy
- SAR Records, an American record label
- Scholars at Risk, a network supporting academic freedom
- School for Advanced Research in anthropology and related fields, Santa Fe, New Mexico, US
- Sigma Alpha Rho, a high school fraternity, Philadelphia, Pennsylvania, US
- Society for Artistic Research
- Sons of the American Revolution, US organisation

=== Railways ===
- Saudi Arabia Railways, national railway company of Saudi Arabia
- Savage Alberta Railway, Alberta, Canada, reporting mark
- South African Railways, now part of Transnet Freight Rail
- South Australian Railways, 1854–1978

=== Military ===
- Sandfontein Artillery Regiment, an artillery regiment of the South African Army
- State Artillery Regiment, an artillery regiment of the South African Army

== Other uses ==
- Sar (surname)
- Sar, an uthra (angel) in Mandaeism
- Sar language, a Bongo–Bagirmi language of southern Chad
- Sample of Anonymised Records, based on the UK population census
- Special administrative region, territorial entity designation
- Student Aid Report, sent to applicants of U.S. federal financial aid for college
- Subject access request, in data protection law
- Super Animal Royale, a 2021 video game developed by Pixile Studios

== See also ==
- Saar (disambiguation)
- SARS (disambiguation)
