= South Central Ambulance Service =

Regional ambulance service in England

South Central Ambulance Service NHS Foundation Trust

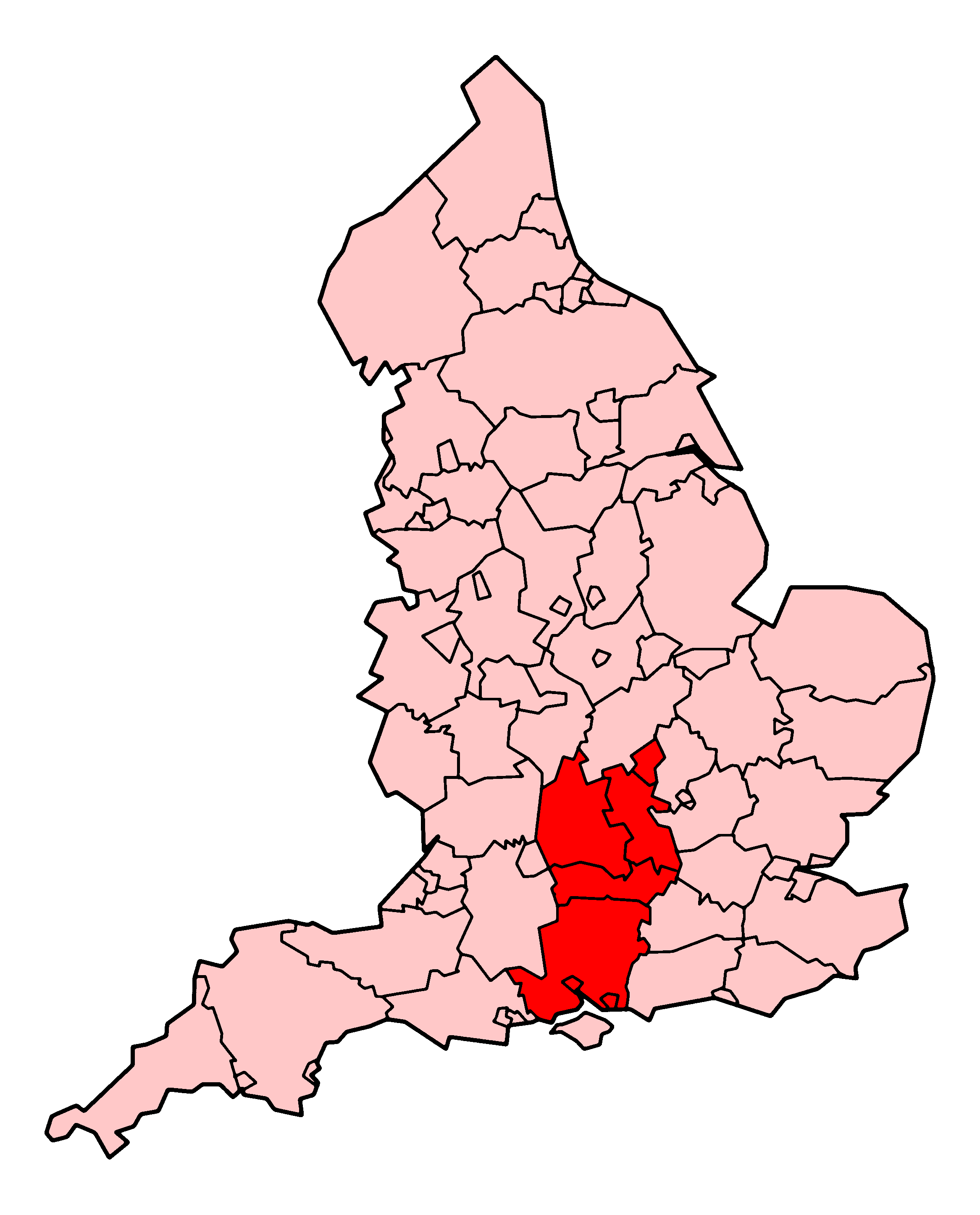
- Map of the South Central Ambulance Service's coverage
- Type: NHS foundation trust
- Established: 1 July 2006
- Headquarters: Northern: Bicester, Oxfordshire, England; Southern: Otterbourne, Hampshire, England
- Region served: Berkshire; Buckinghamshire; Hampshire; Oxfordshire
- Chair: Colin Dennis
- Chief executive: Stuart Rees (Interim)
- Staff: 4,438 (2020/21)
- Website: www.scas.nhs.uk

The South Central Ambulance Service NHS Foundation Trust (SCAS) is the ambulance service for the counties of Berkshire, Buckinghamshire, Oxfordshire and most of Hampshire. (Note: The SCAS area does not entirely match the county boundaries; see Services section.) It is a foundation trust of the National Health Service, and one of ten NHS ambulance trusts in England.

== Services ==
As an ambulance service, SCAS primarily responds to emergency 999 calls, in addition to calls from the NHS non-emergency number, 111. These services are provided in an area that roughly covers the counties of Buckinghamshire, Oxfordshire, Berkshire and Hampshire. The exceptions are North East Hampshire which is served by South East Coast Ambulance Service (SECAmb) and the Shrivenham area of Oxfordshire, which is served by South Western Ambulance Service (SWAS).

The service also provides an emergency transport service for patients in life-threatening condition and a non-emergency patient transport service (NEPTS). The NEPTS transports patients unable to use public transport due to their medical conditions, patients using outpatient clinics and patients being admitted or discharged from hospital. The trust also has a commercial division, which provides first aid training to members of the public, a community equipment service and logistic services. Since 2017, SCAS has also run the NEPTS in Sussex and Surrey, within the South East Coast ambulance area.

It has a resilience and specialist operations department which plans for major or hazardous incidents. This includes a Hazardous Area Response Team (HART), which responds to emergencies involving chemical, biological, radiological or nuclear materials, as well as major incidents. The trust also trains and supports volunteer community first responders (CFR).

The service is supported by its own League of Friends, a registered charity. The South Central Ambulance League of Friends raises funds that are used to enhance the standard of care for patients, provide additional benefits for service personnel, encourage the acquisition of essential life-support skills among the public, and support the deployment of volunteer community first responders. This group had been founded in 1982 to raise funds for the former Oxfordshire Ambulance NHS Trust.

SCAS supplements deployment with co-responders from both the Fire Service, Police and British Armed Forces who combined with CFR volunteers attended 35,716 emergency incidents in the 2020/2021 period.

In addition, SCAS has close operational relations with both Hampshire and Isle of Wight Air Ambulance and Thames Valley Air Ambulance who both provide charitable critical care services. This is further supported by the UK BASICS scheme that has operational volunteers across the south central region providing enhanced critical care clinicians.

SCAS continues to have close working relations with the Isle of Wight NHS Trust by directly supporting their 999 and Ambulance operations.

== History ==
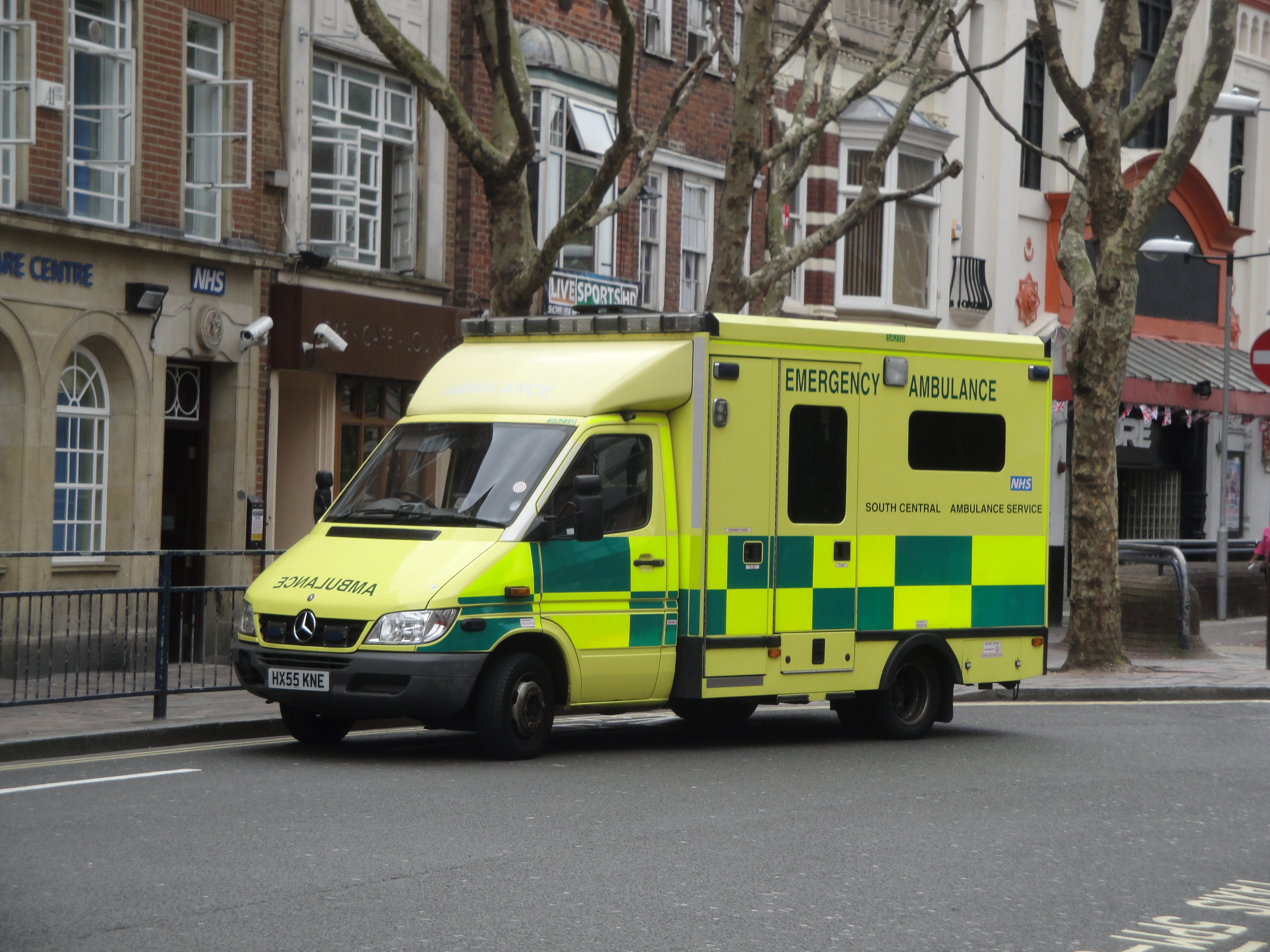
A SCAS Mercedes-Benz Sprinter ambulance in Guildhall Walk, Portsmouth, Hampshire.

South Central Ambulance Service NHS Trust was formed on 1 July 2006, following the merger of the Royal Berkshire Ambulance Service NHS Trust, the Hampshire Ambulance Service NHS Trust, the Oxfordshire Ambulance NHS Trust, and part of the Two Shires Ambulance NHS Trust. The trust achieved Foundation status on 1 March 2012, becoming known as South Central Ambulance Service NHS Foundation Trust.

In June 2011, it was named England's top performing ambulance service, managing to respond to 77.5% of Category A calls within the 8-minute target time, compared to the national average of 74.9%. In October 2011, the BBC discovered that SCAS spent more on private ambulance services to cover 999 calls than any other service in the country.

On 1 March 2012, the trust became an NHS foundation trust.

In October 2013, the trust accidentally published on its website a document listing the age, sexuality and religion of all its 2,826 staff.

SCAS took over patient transport services in Hampshire in October 2014. In 2014, the trust held a recruitment drive in Poland to help fill vacancies. On 1 November 2016, it was announced that the trust would take over the running of NEPTS in the south-east of England from April 2017. The service had previously been run by South East Coast Ambulance Service until 1 April 2016, when it had been taken over by Coperforma, a private-sector provider which had been unable to provide a satisfactory level of service.

In 2015, the trust established a subsidiary company, South Central Fleet Services Ltd, to which 41 estates and facilities staff were transferred. The intention was to achieve VAT benefits, as well as pay bill savings, by recruiting new staff on less expensive non-NHS contracts. VAT benefits arise because NHS trusts can only claim VAT back on a small subset of goods and services they buy. The Value Added Tax Act 1994 provides a mechanism through which NHS trusts can qualify for refunds on contracted out services.

In 2020, SCAS set up and ran the National Covid Response Service (CRS), a public telephone advice line in response to the COVID-19 pandemic. SCAS call takers answered around 2.5 million calls in the first two recognised waves of the outbreak in the UK. This was later accompanied by the vaccine booking and advice service which has taken over 5.5 million calls and booked 2.2 million appointments.

In late 2021 and into 2022, SCAS experienced continued high patient demand on its 111 and 999 services. This was highlighted by SCAS declaring a critical incident on 31 October 2021, due to an "overwhelming" number of emergency calls, on 18 February 2022 due to storm Eunice, and for a third time on 6 April 2022, due to extreme pressures across the service.

In August 2022, SCAS was rated Inadequate by the CQC following failings within the trust, and has been served warning notices to act upon.

In the days leading up to Christmas 2022, SCAS once again declared a critical incident due to service demand attributed to 999 calls being 50% higher, and 111 calls being 75% higher than the same period in 2021. On 21 December, some ambulance staff went on strike as part of the wider national ambulance strikes due to ongoing disputes over pay, working conditions, and hospital handover delays.

In June 2026, SCAS declared a critical incident, citing increased call demand and overall increased pressure on other NHS services due to extreme heat being experienced across the UK, with this being upgraded further to a major incident on 26 June 2026. Mutual aid was sought, with Yorkshire Ambulance Service sending a number of ambulances to support the increased workload. Sustained pressure remained for a number of days, with a step-down to critical incident and a final stand down from this taking place on 29 June 2026.

== Group model with South East Coast Ambulance Service ==
In October 2025, SCAS announned plans to form a group model with South East Coast Ambulance Service (SECAmb), which would mean that the two organisations would work together, sharing expertise and resources.

While the announcement looked to reassure that the two services would remain independent operations to meet the needs of their local communities, they would look to work collaboratively, where possible, moving to align with a single group chief executive and chair supporting both trusts.

In April 2026 it was announced that Colin Dennis would be appointed as the first group chair, taking up post in June 2026. Simon Ashton was announced as the new group chief executive, due to begin his role in the autumn of 2026.

== Performance ==
Performance of SCAS is provided by national NHS England Ambulance Quality Indicators. In February 2016:

- The trust managed to respond to 70% of Red 1 calls (Note: A Red 1 call is assigned to patients in cardiac arrest.) within 8 minutes (5% below the national target)
- 68% of Red 2 calls (Note: A Red 2 call is assigned to other potentially life-threatening incidents, such as stroke, heart attack, difficulty breathing or blood loss.) were responded to within 8 minutes (7% below the national target)
- 93% of Red 19 calls (Note: A Red 19 call is assigned to other incidents in which patient transport is needed.) were responded to within 19 minutes (2% below the national target)
- Cardiac arrest survival rates were 16% (5% above the national average)
- 53% of stroke patients arrived at a thrombolysis centre within 60 minutes of their calls (1% above national average)
- The average time to answer 999 calls was 43 seconds (38 seconds below the national target)
- There were 21,024 incidents requiring patients being taken to an A&E department
- 42% of 999 patients were treated by paramedic crews only.

=== Subcontracting ===
In 2019, the Care Quality Commission reported that ambulance services were relying on private providers because of lack of capacity. The trust spent more than £15 million in 2018/9 on private ambulances and taxis, which dealt with 989,811 999 incidents, an increase from 917,521 the previous year.

=== CQC performance rating ===
In August 2022 the Care Quality Commission (CQC) announced, following an inspection in April and May 2022, that SCAS has now been rated as inadequate and has been served warning notices following failings in Senior Leadership, Safeguarding, Non-functional equipment and Serious Incident Reporting. The CQC gave the following ratings on a scale of outstanding (the service is performing exceptionally well), good (the service is performing well and meeting our expectations), requires improvement (the service isn't performing as well as it should) and inadequate (the service is performing badly):

Inspection Reports
Area	Rating 2016	Rating 2018	Rating 2020	Rating 2021	Rating 2022
Are services Safe?	Good	Good	Good	Good	Inadequate
Are services Effective?	Requires improvement	Good	Good	Good	Good
Are services Caring?	Good	Good	Good	Good	Good
Are services Responsive?	Good	Good	Good	Good	Requires Improvement
Are services Well-led?	Good	Good	Good	Good	Inadequate
Overall rating	Good	Good	Good	Good	Inadequate

In December 2025, the CQC published two reports, upgrading the Trust's Emergency Operations Centre Service from requires improvement to good and upgrading its Emergency and Urgent Car eService from inadequate to requires improvement. SCAS states though, that the overall Trust CQC rating will not change until after a Trust-wide well-led inspection is completed in due course.

== See also ==
- South East Coast Ambulance Service, which serves a small area of north east Hampshire
- Hampshire and Isle of Wight Air Ambulance
- Thames Valley Air Ambulance
