= Sarce =

Sarce may refer to:

- Sarcé, France, a commune
- Šarce, Serbia, a village
- Sarce Aronggear (born 1979), Indonesian sprint canoer

== See also ==
- SARS (disambiguation)
