= Peter Holden (doctor) =

British doctor

- Born: Sheffield
- Education: Shrewsbury School
- Known for: medical politics air ambulance physician
- Medical career
- Profession: doctor
- Field: general practice

Peter J P Holden (born 1955) is a British doctor who works as a general practitioner in Matlock, Derbyshire. He is a member of the council of the British Medical Association, member of its GP committee since 1981 who was a negotiator with the General Practitioner's Committee (GPC) for more the 15 years.

== Medical career ==
Holden was born in 1955. Holden has been a member of the British Medical Association's General Practice Committee (GPC) for more than thirty five years. He was a member of the negotiating team behind the 2004 new General Medical Services (GMS) contract deal. He was a negotiator for more than fifteen years, one of only five people to serve that length of time. Holden has been a member of the council of the British Medical Association for 31 years. In 2022, he was elected for a further four-year term. He was elected Vice President of UEMO in November 2022.

He trained to deal with casualties in major incidents and gained a Diploma in Immediate Care in 1991 and a Fellowship in Immediate Care with the Royal College of Surgeons of Edinburgh in 2001. He attended the Hillsborough disaster in 1989, arriving about an hour into the incident and certifying many people dead. He treated victims of the 7 July 2005 London bombings when a bomb exploded on a bus that was travelling through Upper Woburn Place. Holden has worked as a physician with emergency care charity Magpas Air Ambulance since 2007 and Lincolnshire & Nottinghamshire Air Ambulance since 1998. In 2019, he became the first general medical practitioner to chair the Inter Collegiate Board for Training in PreHospital Emergency Medicine In 2024 he was appointed the Clinical Trustee and Chair of the medical committee of St John Ambulance

== Awards and honours ==
In 2002, Holden received the Queen Elizabeth II Golden Jubilee Medal, in 2012 the Queen's Diamond Jubilee Medal and in 2022 the Queen's Diamond Jubilee Medal in all cases in recognition of his work in Pre Hospital Emergency Medicine (PHEM) In November 2015, he received a lifetime achievement award at National Air Ambulance Awards of Excellence.
