= Suffolk Accident Rescue Service =

UK registered charity

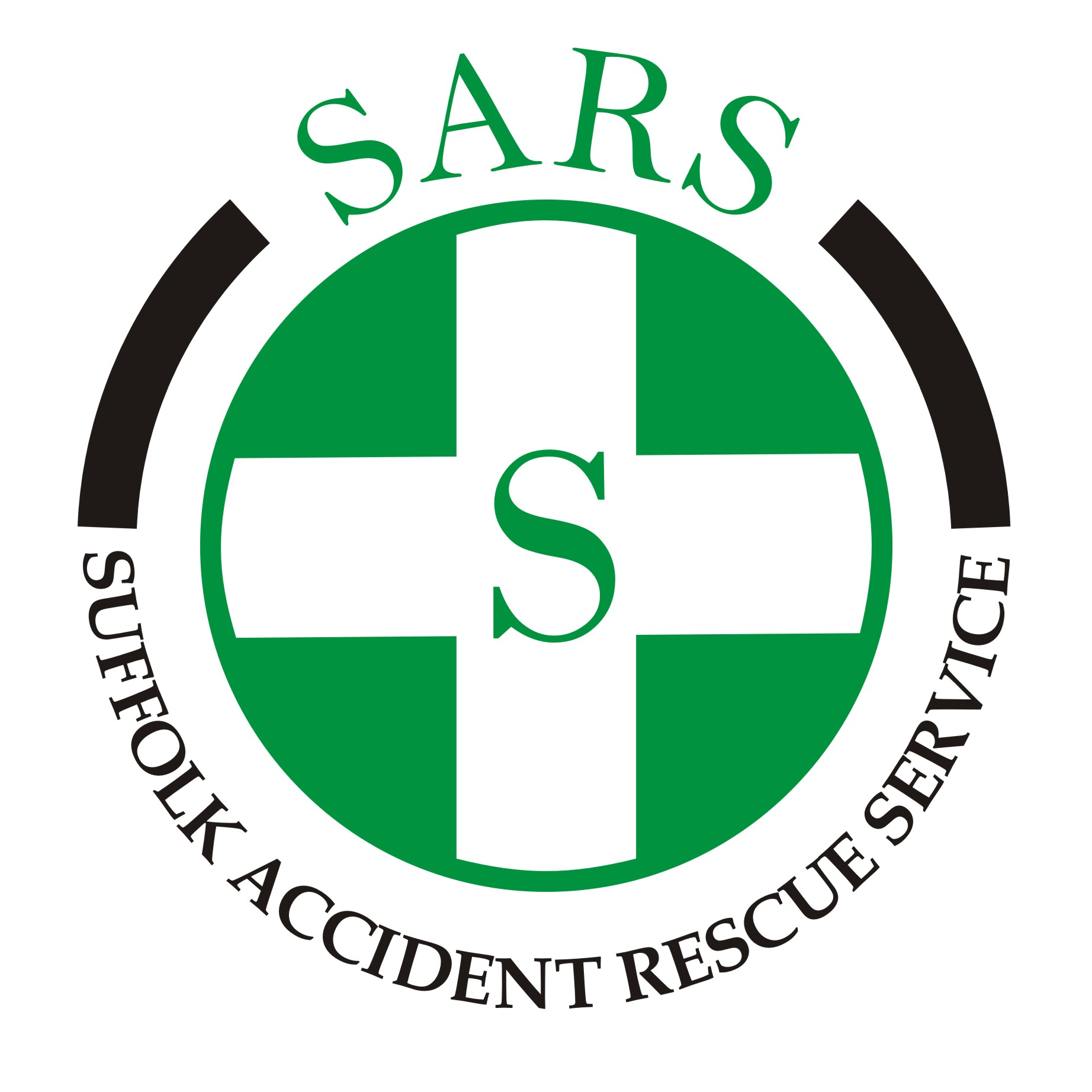
- Abbreviation: SARS
- Formation: 1 May 1972
- Legal status: Registered Charity No. 1168764
- Headquarters: Woolpit
- Region served: Suffolk and adjoining areas
- Website: www.sars999.org.uk

The Suffolk Accident Rescue Service (SARS) is a registered charity supported by donations, which assists the East of England Ambulance Service NHS Trust in providing medical care at the scene of accidents and emergencies in Suffolk and surrounding counties. The organisation relies on volunteer medical professionals and Allied Health Professionals to provide this service on an entirely voluntary basis. The headquarters are in Woolpit. It is an affiliated member of the British Association for Immediate Care.

== Purpose of the organisation ==
SARS was established in 1972 as a group of doctors willing to give up their spare time to assist at the scene of trauma and medical emergencies. In 2011, SARS opened its membership to paramedics and other health professionals.

The service continues to train and equip participating members. By 2017 the charity had answered around 17,000 calls - an average of more than 1 call each day over the previous 45 years. All SARS members are volunteers who receive no payment or expenses for responding to emergency calls and the work is undertaken without any charge to the patient, ambulance service, UK tax-payer or National Lottery funding.

== Awards and nominations ==
- In 2023 paramedic Steve Murrow was nominated for East of England Ambulance Service Volunteer of the Year award.

== Pre-hospital Care Network in the East of England ==
This charity is one of many Pre-hospital care providers in the East, which has an established trauma network – the first to be fully operational in the UK.

Other Pre-hospital care providers that they work and train alongside are:

- BASICS Essex Accident Rescue Service (BEARS)
- BASICS Hertfordshire
- Essex & Herts Air Ambulance
- Magpas Air Ambulance
- East Anglian Air Ambulance

The East of England teams commonly end up working alongside crews from Lincolnshire & Nottinghamshire Air Ambulance, London's Air Ambulance and The Air Ambulance Service, along with other BASICS charities.
