= East Anglian Air Ambulance =

English air ambulance charity

- Abbreviation: EAAA
- Founded: 2000
- Type: Charitable organisation
- Legal status: Registered Charity No. 1083876
- Purpose: Dedicated helicopter emergency medical services (HEMS) provider
- Headquarters: Norwich Airport, Norfolk, England
- Region served: Norfolk; Suffolk; Cambridgeshire; Bedfordshire
- Aircraft operated: 2 x Airbus Helicopters H145
- Revenue: £19 million (2024)
- Staff: 125 (2024)
- Volunteers: 258 (2024)
- Website: www.eaaa.org.uk

The East Anglian Air Ambulance (EAAA) is an air ambulance providing helicopter emergency medical services (HEMS) across the English counties of Norfolk, Suffolk, Cambridgeshire and Bedfordshire. The appeal to fund the service was launched in the summer of 2000 by top jockey Frankie Dettori, who had been injured in a serious plane crash in June of that year. When flying commenced in January 2001, the service was initially available only one day a week. The charity operates two helicopters, 365 days a year, from its bases at Cambridge Airport and Norwich Airport, covering over 5,000 square miles (13,000 km^{2}) and a population of approximately 3.5 million.

== Mission ==
EAAA's mission statement is: "To alleviate suffering and save lives, by the rapid delivery of specialist clinicians and equipment to accidents and medical emergencies and the subsequent transfer of patients to and between hospitals".

The charity provides air ambulance cover for East Anglia, in association with East of England Ambulance Service, which provides highly skilled critical care paramedics who fly with the charity. Doctors are seconded from their home NHS trusts.

== Aircraft ==
Since April 2015 at Cambridge and February 2016 at Norwich, EAAA have operated Airbus H145 helicopters. The introduction of the H145 provides EAAA with a helicopter that is capable of carrying two flight crew, three clinicians and a patient, with increased cabin space and performance. Anglia One, G-RESU, covers Norfolk and Suffolk and is based at Norwich Airport. Anglia Two, G-HEMC, which was the first H145 to operate in the United Kingdom, covers Bedfordshire and Cambridgeshire and is based at Cambridge Airport. Both helicopters, their pilots and engineers are provided by Babcock Mission Critical Services Onshore, formerly known as Bond Air Services.

EAAA's first aircraft was a Bolkow 105, commissioned from Sterling Aviation. The aircraft was based at Norwich Airport and had the call sign 'Anglia One'.

In June 2006, a new helicopter, a MBB/Kawasaki BK 117, G-OEMT, was commissioned from Sterling Aviation. The aircraft replaced the Bolkow 105, G-EYNL, and went into service as Anglia One. In August 2007, a second MBB/Kawasaki BK 117, G-RESC, went into service as Anglia Two. Sometime between 2007 and 2011, the EAAA produced a rebranded Revell Eurocopter Medicopter 117 kit, which included decals for G-RESC and G-OEMT, and was sold to raise funds.

In March 2011, EAAA changed operator and moved from Sterling Aviation to interim supplier, Bond Air Services. Bond later successfully tendered for the contract to operate both helicopters. During the interim period EAAA flew red aircraft but soon returned to their more familiar yellow livery with the introduction of the Eurocopter EC135.

In 2012, EAAA commissioned the fully night-capable EC135 T2e and commenced the CAA approval process to begin the night HEMS service.

The charity also has a number of response cars, used when the helicopter is unavailable or conditions are unsuitable.

== Operations ==
When the service was first launched, Anglia One operated for only one day a week. This was soon expanded to five days a week and later to service of seven days a week.

Anglia Two was launched in August 2007 and began operating five days a week (from Sunday to Thursday). The service provided by Anglia Two was extended to seven days a week in 2008. It was crewed by the emergency medical team from Magpas Helimedix 24/7, based at RAF Wyton until its move to Cambridge Airport where the charity decided to use its own medical personnel - predominantly doctors specialising in emergency medicine, anaesthesia and/or intensive care medicine from hospitals within the region.

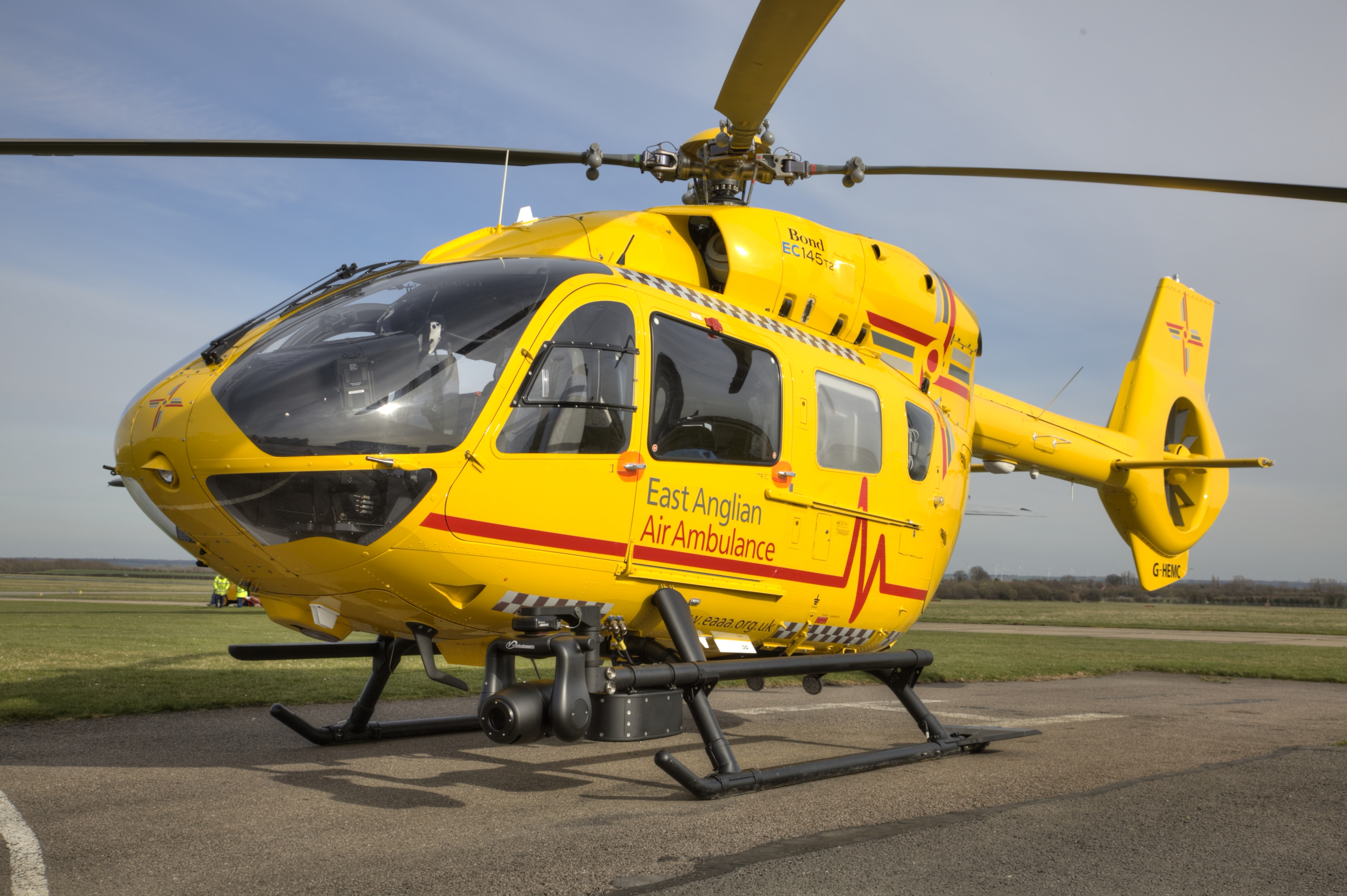
G-HEMC, an Airbus Helicopters H145 completed its first HEMS mission with EAAA on 2 April 2015. This aircraft now operates as Anglia Two at Cambridge Airport

Typical incidents for which the assistance of the air ambulance is requested include road traffic collisions, horse riding accidents, and falls from height. The EAAA team of highly skilled doctors and critical care paramedics also treat many people injured in agricultural, industrial and sporting accidents as well as medical emergencies.

Airlifted patients are most likely to go to the major trauma centre at Addenbrooke's Hospital in Cambridge, the specialist burns unit in Broomfield Hospital, Chelmsford or the specialist heart attack centre at Norfolk and Norwich Hospital. Patients less severely injured, but where travel would take an excessive amount of time, may be airlifted to their local A&E with trauma unit.

In May 2013, EAAA received approval to fly night time HEMS missions. The first team was available and ready to fly on 24 May and was called that night to a traffic collision in Essex. The clinicians were flown to the scene where they treated an injured motorcyclist with the aid of night vision equipment. The patient was then flown back to Cambridge where he was taken to the major trauma centre at Addenbrooke's Hospital.

In 2018, the charity appeared on the Channel 4 TV programme Emergency Helicopter Medics, which follows the crews responding and treating emergency patients.

== Aircrew ==
For the majority of call-outs Anglia One and Two will carry a crew of four; one pilot, one co-pilot, one critical care paramedic and one doctor.

Prince William, Duke of Cambridge trained as a civilian helicopter pilot in late 2014, so that he could work as a pilot with East Anglian Air Ambulance from 2015 to 2017. His salary was donated to charity.

== Finances ==
The East Anglian Air Ambulance is a charitable service and does not normally receive direct funding from the government. In the year ending June 2024, the charity's income was £19 million. Its expenditure was £17.9M, of which £13.5M was spent on operating the air ambulance service. The charity's funding comes from public donations and fundraising activities, including the purchase of weekly lottery tickets, corporate donations and legacy giving.

== Pre-hospital care network in the East of England ==
This charity is one of many pre-hospital care providers in the East, which has an established trauma network.

Other pre-hospital care providers that they work and train alongside are:

- BASICS Essex Accident Rescue Service (BEARS)
- BASICS Hertfordshire
- Suffolk Accident Rescue Service (SARS)
- Essex & Herts Air Ambulance
- Magpas Air Ambulance

The East of England teams commonly end up working alongside crews from Lincolnshire & Nottinghamshire Air Ambulance, London's Air Ambulance and The Air Ambulance Service, along with other BASICS charities.

== See also ==
- Air ambulances in the United Kingdom
