= East of England Ambulance Service =

Ambulance service in England

East of England Ambulance Service NHS Trust

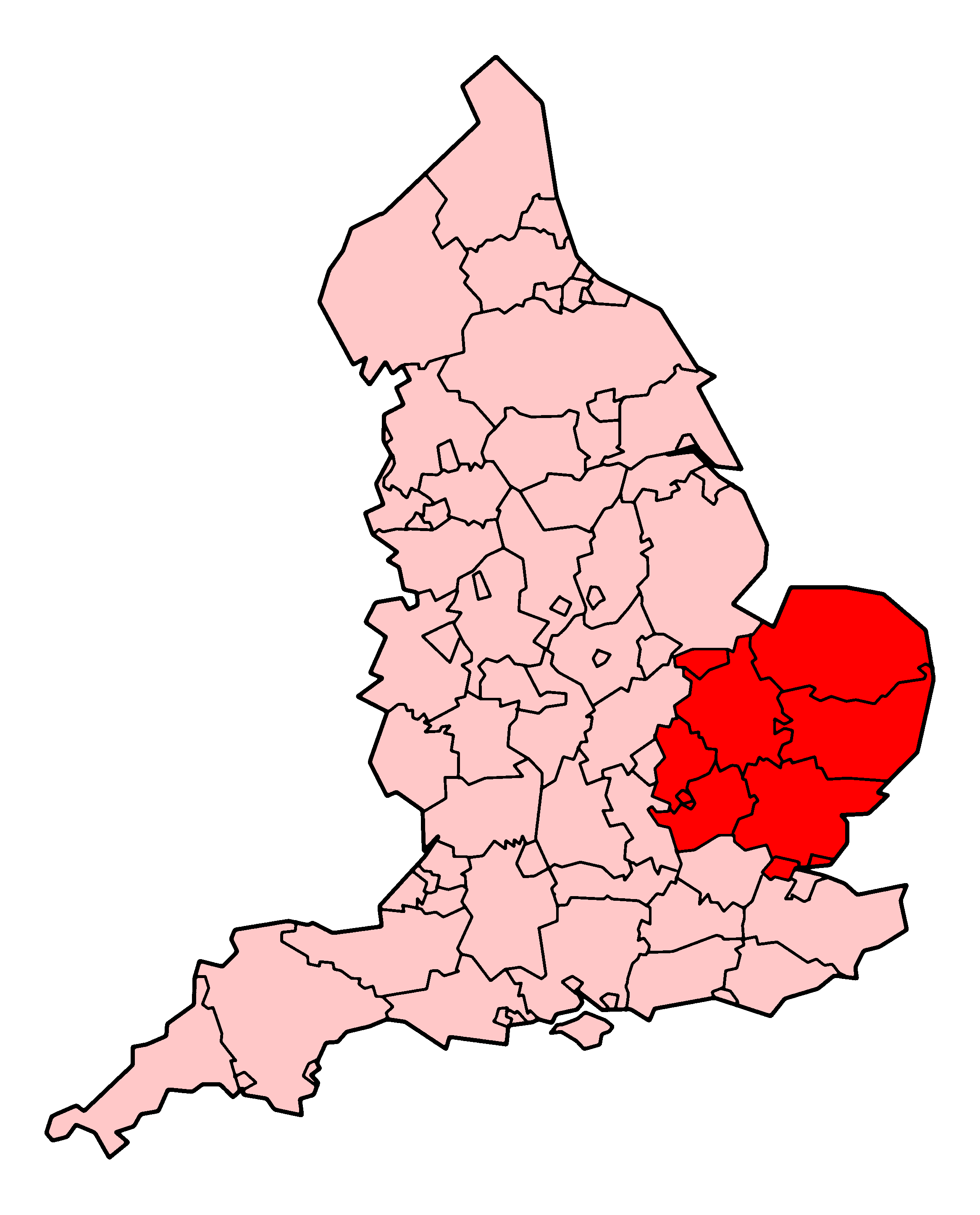
- Area served by East of England Ambulance Service NHS Trust
- Type: NHS trust
- Established: 1 July 2006
- Headquarters: Royston, Hertfordshire
- Region served: Norfolk, Bedfordshire, Cambridgeshire, Essex, Hertfordshire and Suffolk
- Area size: 7,500 square miles (19,000 km^{2})
- Population: 6.2 million
- Budget: Approx. £247 million
- Chair: Julie Thallon (Interim)
- Chief executive: Neill Moloney
- Staff: 4,780 (2019)
- Website: www.eastamb.nhs.uk

The East of England Ambulance Service NHS Trust (EEAST) is an NHS trust responsible for providing National Health Service (NHS) ambulance services in the counties of Bedfordshire, Cambridgeshire, Essex, Hertfordshire, Norfolk and Suffolk, in the East of England region. These consist of approximately 6.2 million people across an area of 7,500 square miles (19,000 km^{2}).

It is one of ten ambulance services trusts providing England with emergency medical services, and is part of the NHS, receiving direct government funding for its role.

As well as providing an emergency ambulance service, the trust also provides non emergency patient transport services, commercial services and special operations such as emergency planning, and hazardous materials incident response. The service also support a number of emergency charities, such as air ambulances, who provide doctors for serious incidents.

The trust controls the mobilisation of critical care charities throughout its area. These include Magpas (HEMS), Essex & Herts Air Ambulance (HEMS), East Anglian Air Ambulance (HEMS), BASICS Essex Accident Rescue Service (BEARS), Suffolk Accident Rescue Service (SARS), Norfolk Accident Rescue Service (NARS), BASICS Hertfordshire, and the Bedfordshire and Hertfordshire Emergency Critical Care Scheme (BHECCS). The service can also, if required, mobilise London's Air Ambulance and even the Kent, Surrey and Sussex Air Ambulance if there is a major incident requiring more than one critical care team, and where other teams in the region are operating at maximum capacity. The trauma teams are dispatched by a critical care paramedic and dispatcher at the critical care desk, housed in the Tactical Operations Centre based at Chelmsford AOC, who filter through every call the ambulance service receives, interrogates it and makes a clinical decision on whether to dispatch a critical care resource.

== History ==
The trust was formed in 2006 from the three-way merger of the Bedfordshire and Hertfordshire Ambulance and Paramedic Service NHS Trust, the East Anglian Ambulance NHS Trust and the Essex Ambulance Service NHS Trust. The result was a service covering an area of 7,500 square miles (19,000 km^{2}) with a population of 6.2 million people, and one which answers around one million emergency calls per year.

The East Anglian Ambulance NHS Trust had been formed by the 1993 merger of Cambridgeshire, Norfolk and Suffolk Ambulance Services and the Bedfordshire and Hertfordshire Ambulance and Paramedic Service NHS Trust had been formed by the 1992 merger of Bedfordshire and Hertfordshire Ambulance Services.

In 2009, the trust was censured by the Care Quality Commission (CQC) after inspection of an ambulance depot and seven of its 100 ambulance stations found patient-carrying vehicles were "dirty" and that staff were "unsure of basic measures for infection prevention and control". The service launched an "urgent and comprehensive review" of its ambulance cleaning programme and reiterated its stance on patient safety, adding that "ensuring consistent high standards of cleanliness is a challenge" with so many stations, covering six counties and an area of 7,500 square-miles.

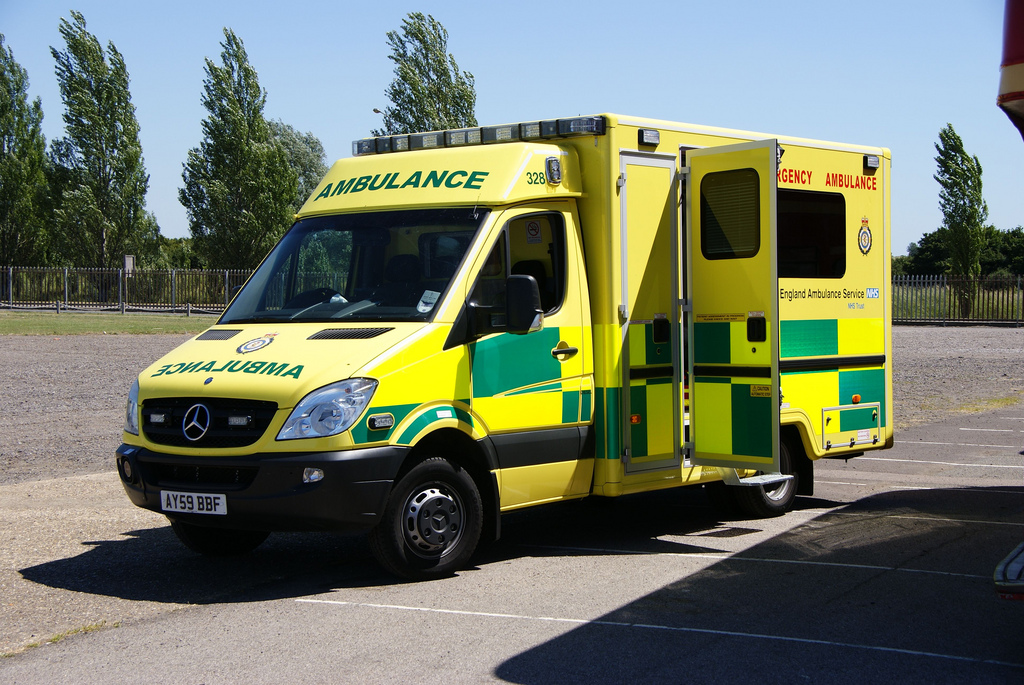
A 2010 Mercedes-Benz Sprinter Double Staffed Ambulance (DSA)

== Statistics and resources ==
In 2015/16, the trust received 1,037,119 emergency calls and handled 500,620 non-emergency patient transport journeys. The trust arrived at 73.6% of emergency Red 1 calls within eight minutes, and 69.4% of emergency Red 2 calls within eight minutes.

EEAST employs more than 4,000 staff and has around 1,500 volunteers.

As of March 2026, the trust has the following resources in operation:

- 520 front-line emergency ambulances
- 67 marked rapid-response vehicles (RRV)
- 180 non-emergency ambulances (patient transport service - PTS)
- 52 major incident support vehicles (HART/major incident/resilience vehicles)
- Over 130 ambulance stations and response posts
- 3 ambulance operations centers (AOC - control rooms) in Bedford, Chelmsford and Norwich
- 4 training centres in Chelmsford, Welwyn Garden City, Bury St Edmunds and Norwich

The trust has its own emergency driving school, which trains drivers in 999 emergency driving under blue lights and sirens.

=== Stations and response posts ===
EEAST has 90 stations spread across the six counties the trust covers. Each station can house a mixture of accident and emergency vehicles, RRVs and patient transport services vehicles. The station has facilities for staff to rest, prepare ambulances and restock consumable medical equipment. Some of the larger stations are known as make ready stations or hub stations which house a team of make ready operatives who clean, fuel, restock, maintain and care for frontline accident and emergency ambulances. The larger stations also have the ability to house the resilience teams, which comprise Class C or C1 vehicles laden with equipment for response to major incidents.

The trust also utilises response posts across its service area, which house restrooms, kitchen and seating areas, allowing the control centres to strategically stage crews across towns and cities to allow for better response times. Some response posts consist of small rented industrial units spread out across a city, or reserved spots in large commercial areas or other service buildings such as fire stations.

=== Vehicles ===
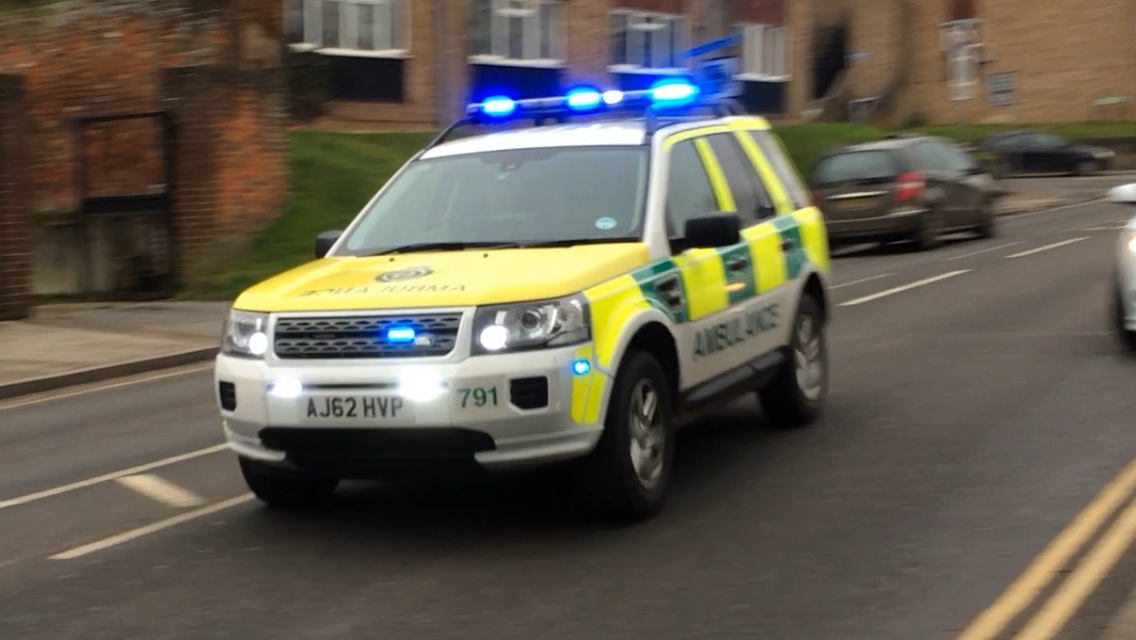
Land Rover Freelander Leading Operations Manager & Rapid Response Vehicle

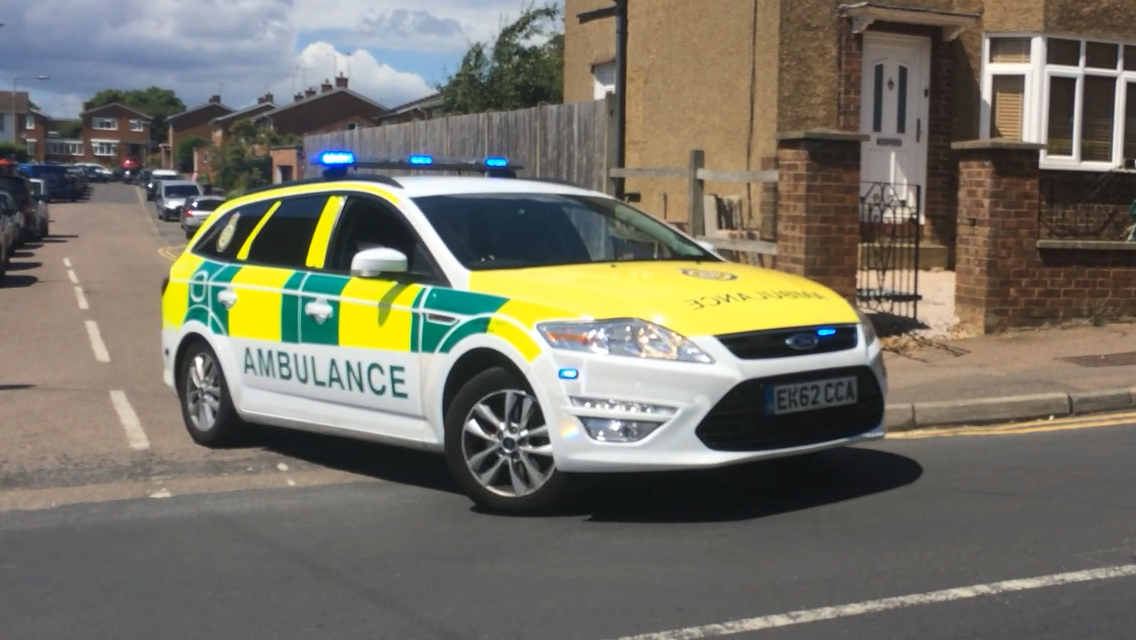
A Ford Mondeo RRV in Hitchin, Hertfordshire

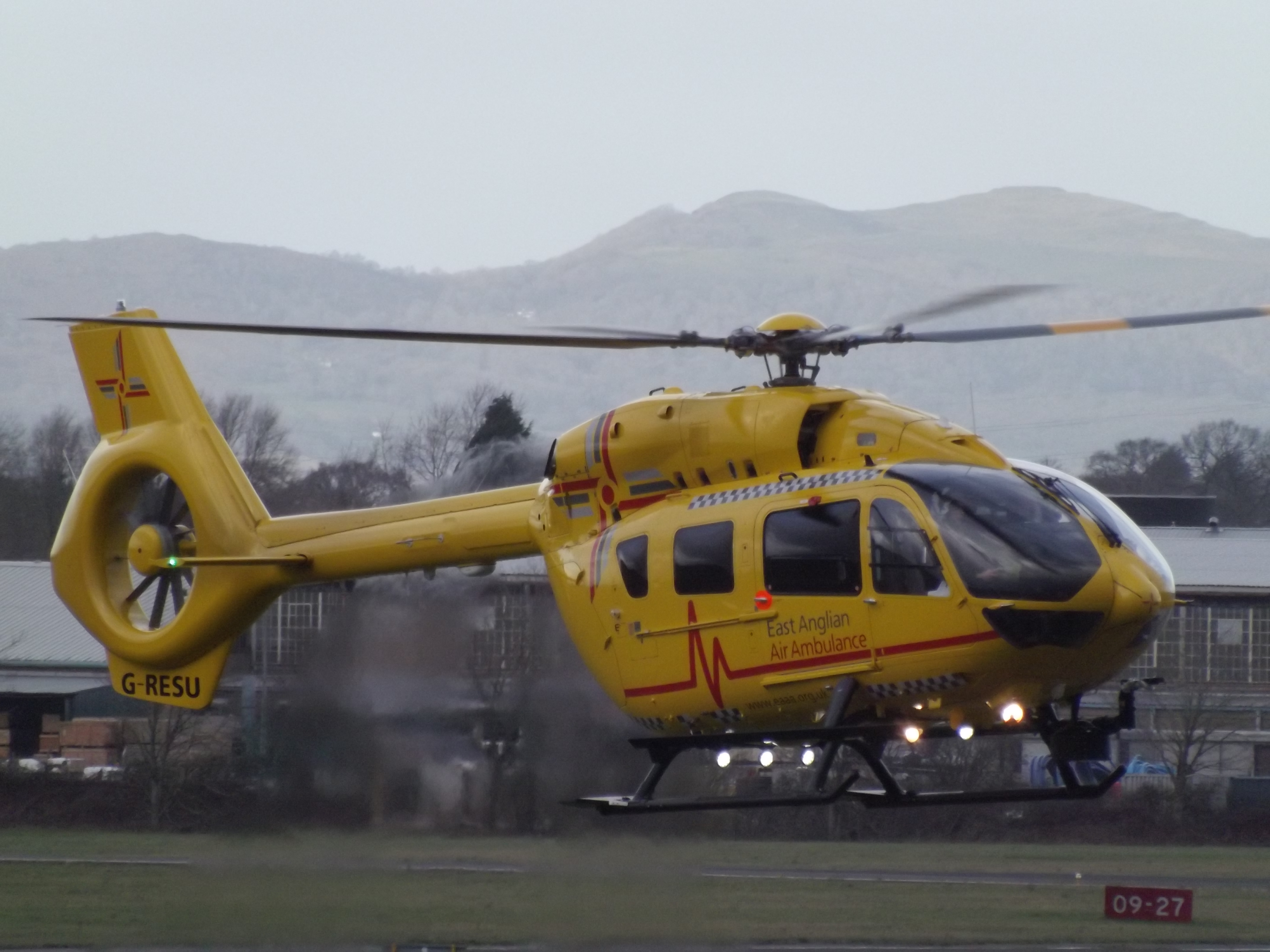
Helicopters from the East Anglian Air Ambulance are based in Cambridge and Norwich.

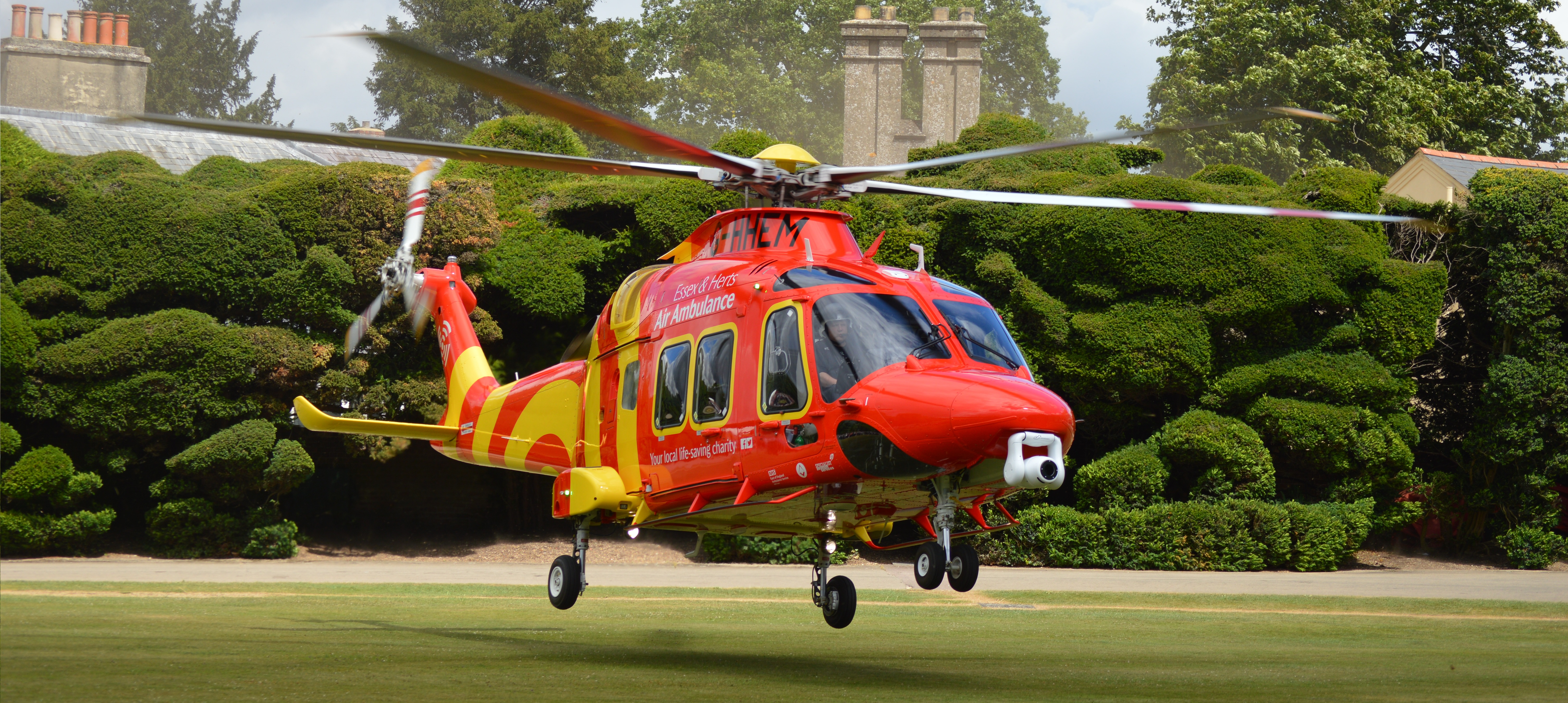
G-HHEM (North Weald) and G-EHEM (Earls Colne) can be dispatched from Essex & Herts Air Ambulance.

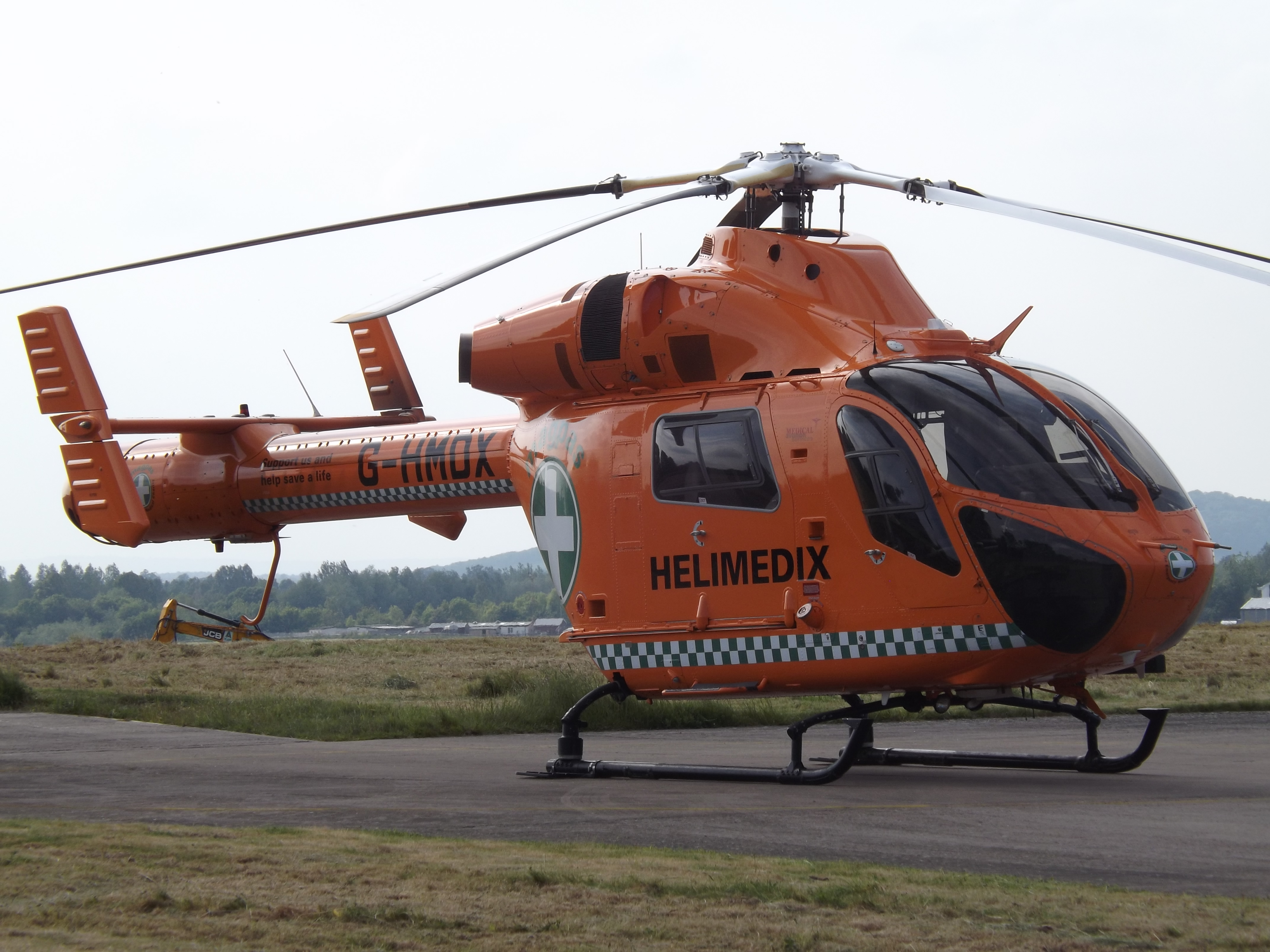
Magpas Air Ambulance is based at RAF Wyton.

==== Ambulances ====
The trust used exclusively the Mercedes-Benz Sprinter as front-line double staffed ambulances (DSA), with the exception of a single Vauxhall Movano four-wheel drive vehicle for use at Newmarket Racecourse. In 2009, the service started the transition to a brand-new Sprinter only fleet from a wide range of other brands – including Ford, Vauxhall and older Mercedes-Benz vehicles. The scheme was finished in 2016, when the last brand-new Sprinter was delivered, although all have now reached the end of their cycle life. In March 2018, four new vehicles were trialled across the East of England, with one concept vehicle being designed exclusively for and by the trust.

In May 2018, the trust bought 32 five-year-old Fiat Ducato vehicles decommissioned by the West Midlands Ambulance Service – described as "clapped out vehicles which colleagues in other trusts would have sent to the scrapyard" and contrasted with the luxury cars with which senior managers were provided in 2017.

In 2019, the trust began rolling out the new, lightweight box body Fiat Ducato ambulances across the trust, and therefore replacing the Mercedes Sprinter ambulances. Ninety-four staff were identified as being unable to drive the vehicles, mostly because they were too tall.

In 2024, EEAST began its next cycle of fleet replacement resulting in a fleet composed of different models of vehicle. Renault master ambulances were originally sourced following an order from a private ambulance provider who subsequently cancelled the order. This small batch led to a second batch being commissioned to bridge the gap between retiring the dated Mercedes Sprinter Box vehicles for those exempt from driving fiats and to increase the amount of B Class vehicles within the service (these Renault vehicles have now been re-plated to C1).

Alongside this, a group of M.A.N TGE ambulances were commissioned as specialist bariatric vehicles however are being used as regular ambulances at present due to an increasing amount of off the road vehicles as the pre existing fiat fleet reach the end of their term.

EEAST have introduced C1 Class Ford Transit ambulances (28 as a trial) and are introducing White C1 Class M.A.N ambulances as the replacement of the Fiat Ducato ambulances. These new vehicles are fitted with solar panels on the roof to reduce the risk of flat batteries.

Typically EEAST have used Skoda Octavia Scout 4x4 capable vehicles as rapid response cars. In 2024 EEAST commissioned Skoda Kodiaq and electric Skoda Enyaq vehicles alongside Volkswagen Transporter vans which are used for Locality Operations Managers and Urgent Care scheme cars.

==== Patient transport services ====
The trust provides a patient transport service (Rated "Requires Improvement") bringing patients to and from the regions hospitals and healthcare services in a range of capacities from outpatients to renal patients, as well as discharges from wards and emergency departments. 2015 saw a new fleet of Citroen Relay, Fiat Ducato and Peugeot Boxer vans brought into the trust along with some of its older Renault vehicles which remain in use for bariatric transport. The new vehicles have the ability to carry a number of patients at a time or have the capability to lock a wheelchair in place or accept a Ferno Stretcher. A number of these vehicles are fitted with blue lights and sirens for use in major incidents. Contrary to popular belief, these vehicles are rarely used for high dependency transfers, a job which is performed by the Emergency Operations side of the trust or a contracted charity (e.g. St John Ambulance England) or private company.

==== Air ambulances ====
The trust provides critical care paramedics (CCPs) to three local charity air ambulances in the region: Magpas, Essex & Herts Air Ambulance and the East Anglian Air Ambulance. These paramedics work alongside doctors, to administer advanced treatment at the scene of the accident. Although the service uses the air ambulances, it does not fund the charities.

== Tactical operations centre ==
The tactical operations centre (TOC) has regional oversight of all calls, resources and system pressures. They have oversight of the trust 'surge' levels, vehicle out of service time and hospital delays. They are responsible for effective escalation of extended hospital handover delays to the senior management, integrated care boards and NHS England. The tactical operations centre also houses the critical care desk (CCD), who are responsible for the allocation and dispatch of the HEMS teams and house the incident command desk supervisor who is responsible for the allocation and dispatch of resilience assets and staff, such as the HART team and NILOs and the handling of any critical or major incident.

Staff roles in the department:

- Tactical cell assistant (TA)
- Critical care desk dispatcher (CCD)
- Incident command desk supervisor (ICD)
- People and vehicle support hub manager (PVSH/PVSH-M)
- Duty tactical commander (DTC)

== Patient transport service ==
The trust took over patient transport services in Hertfordshire and Bedfordshire in February 2018, after the private provider, Private Ambulance Service went into administration. A two-year contract was awarded on an emergency basis.

== Performance ==
In 2013/14, the trust missed all of its targets in Cambridgeshire and Peterborough. 73.6% of "red 1 calls" for immediately life-threatening situations were met within eight minutes against a target of 75%. 69.4% of "red 2 calls", which may be life-threatening but less time critical were responded to within eight minutes against a 75% target. In north Norfolk, rapid responses during one month were as low as 25%. According to the Clinical Commissioning Group performance had "deteriorated overall in comparison to prior year at both regional and local level". In August 2014, the trust was fined £1.2 million over these failures. It was also fined £300,000 over turnaround times at hospitals. The fines were accrued between April and July 2014. EEAST, which handles more than 900,000 emergency 999 calls a year, said it was recruiting hundreds of new staff and investing in new ambulances. In a statement in November 2014, chief executive Anthony Marsh blamed EEAST's continued failure to meet its emergency response time targets on a lack of staff. Acknowledging that the service was still "not good enough" he said that "significant progress" had been made; 536 student paramedics and a further 69 graduate and qualified paramedics and emergency medical technicians had been recruited since January 2014.

In October 2014, EEAST apologised after claims were published in a local newspaper that a body had been left lying next to dustbins at its station in Ely, Cambridgeshire the previous month. Chief executive Anthony Marsh said the trust was "very sorry for what happened" and had started a "thorough investigation". An EEAST spokesman confirmed the investigation involved "the transportation of a deceased patient", but said he could not comment further as inquiries were ongoing. The newspaper which published the claims said it had done so after being approached by a whistleblower.

The trust was accused of putting patient safety at risk in July 2017 because of a "fixation" with hitting response time targets, using a practice referred to as "stopping the clock" - sending a rapid response vehicle to a call within the target time, leaving the patient to wait longer for the arrival of an ambulance.

Delays, according to a whistleblower, led to the deaths of at least 19 patients and serious harm to 21 more during January 2018. A patient taken to the Norfolk and Norwich University Hospital, had to wait in the back of the ambulance that took him there for 4.5 hours before being seen by a doctor inside the building. A summit was held with NHS England and NHS Improvement in January 2018. It was announced that it would "take steps to improve staff availability at peak times, including action to improve staff health through flu vaccination and reviewing the trust's leave policy" and that it would hire extra vehicles. The trust directors were accused by Norman Lamb of misleading MPs after a meeting about these allegations and several MPs said they had no confidence in the trust's leadership.

The trust is one of the poorest performing in England on most urgent response times and is considering employing military drivers and volunteer drivers due to staff shortages. Proposals made in August 2018 to restrict staff holiday leave between 12 November and 12 January were greeted with a storm of protest. The trust decided controversially sometimes to ask one ambulance to deal with two patients. A senior trust paramedic stated, "It's desperate. I've never heard anything like this. A paramedic might have a clinically stable patient on board but if that patient then becomes unstable and you're sitting on scene with perhaps two unstable patients, what do you do? Do you separate one of them from the equipment? Who do you pick?"

In 2018, the trust said it would need 100 more paramedics to meet the new ambulance performance standards. This could cost £5M a year. The Midlands and East regional director of NHS England expressed concern in November 2018 that the trust was prioritising category-4 calls in order to meet its targets, at the expense of more clinically urgent patients, and that the trust's winter plan was inadequate.

In September 2020 the CQC criticised the poor leadership of the trust for fostering bullying and not acting decisively on allegations of predatory sexual behaviour towards patients. It was required by the Equality and Human Rights Commission to sign a legally-binding agreement stating how it will protect its staff from sexual harassment in April 2021.

=== Subcontracting ===
In 2019, the CQC reported that ambulance services were relying on private providers because of lack of capacity. The trust spent £9.5M on private ambulances for 999 and non-urgent work in 2018/19, double the amount spent previous year.

In 2019, the trust disbanded its health and wellbeing service and outsourced the occupational health function to a new supplier, Kays Medical.

=== CQC performance rating ===
In its last inspection of the service in June 2020, the Care Quality Commission (CQC) gave the following ratings on a scale of outstanding (the service is performing exceptionally well), good (the service is performing well and meeting our expectations), requires improvement (the service isn't performing as well as it should) and inadequate (the service is performing badly):

Inspection Reports
Area	2016 Rating	2018 Rating	2019 Rating	2020 Rating	2022 Rating
Are services Safe?	Requires improvement	Requires improvement	Requires improvement	Requires improvement	Requires Improvement
Are services Effective?	Requires improvement	Requires improvement	Requires improvement	Requires improvement	Requires Improvement
Are services Caring	Outstanding	Outstanding	Outstanding	Outstanding	Good
Are services Responsive	Requires improvement	Requires improvement	Good	Good	Requires Improvement
Are services Well-led	Requires improvement	Requires improvement	Inadequate	Inadequate	Requires Improvement
Overall rating	Requires improvement	Requires improvement	Requires improvement	Requires improvement	Requires Improvement

== See also ==
- Emergency medical services in the United Kingdom
- Healthcare in Bedfordshire
- Healthcare in Cambridgeshire
- Healthcare in Essex
- Healthcare in Hertfordshire
- Healthcare in Norfolk
