= SARS (disambiguation) =

SARS is a viral respiratory disease identified in the early 2000s caused by SARS-CoV-1.

SARS or Sars may also refer to:

== Biology and medicine ==
- SARS (gene), a human gene for encoding the enzyme cytoplasmic seryl-tRNA synthetase
- Severe acute respiratory syndrome–related coronavirus (SARSr-CoV or SARS-CoV), a virus species containing:
  - Severe acute respiratory syndrome coronavirus (SARS-CoV or SARS-CoV-1), the virus that causes:
    - Severe acute respiratory syndrome, an infectious disease first identified in 2002
  - Severe acute respiratory syndrome coronavirus 2 (SARS-CoV-2), the virus that causes:
    - Coronavirus disease 2019 (COVID-19), an infectious disease first identified in 2019
  - Bat SARS-like coronavirus WIV1 (Bat SL-CoV-WIV1 or SARS-like coronavirus WIV1), a strain isolated from Chinese rufous horseshoe bats

== Organizations ==
- Sarsılmaz Arms, a Turkish firearm manufacturer
- South African Revenue Service
- Special Anti-Robbery Squad, former unit of the Nigeria Police Force
  - End SARS, decentralised protest movement aimed at disbanding the squad
- Suffolk Accident Rescue Service, a charity providing medical care in the United Kingdom

== People ==
- Alain Sars (born 1961), French football referee
- Ernst Sars (1835–1917), Norwegian historian, son of Michael Sars
- Eva Sars (1858–1907), later Eva Nansen, Norwegian singer and skier, daughter of Michael Sars, wife of Fridtjof Nansen
- Georg Ossian Sars (1837–1927), Norwegian biologist, son of Michael Sars
- Maren Sars (1811–1898) née Welhaven, Norwegian socialite and wife of Michael Sars
- Michael Sars (1805–1869), Norwegian biologist and priest

== Places ==
=== France ===
- Le Sars, a commune in Pas-de-Calais
- Sars-le-Bois, a commune in Pas-de-Calais
- Sars-Poteries, a commune in Nord
- Sars-et-Rosières, a commune in Nord

=== Elsewhere ===
- Sars (urban-type settlement), Perm Krai, Russia
- Sars Bank, a bank in the Drake Passage between South America and Antarctica

== Other uses ==
- SARS (band) (Sveže Amputirana Ruka Satrijanija), a Serbian alternative rock band
- Sarah D. Bunting or Sars, American blogger and journalist
- Sarsfields GAA (Cork) or Sars, a hurling club in Ireland

== See also ==
- SAR (disambiguation)
- Sarsaparilla (soft drink) or sarsi
