= Hampshire and Isle of Wight Air Ambulance =

English charity air ambulance

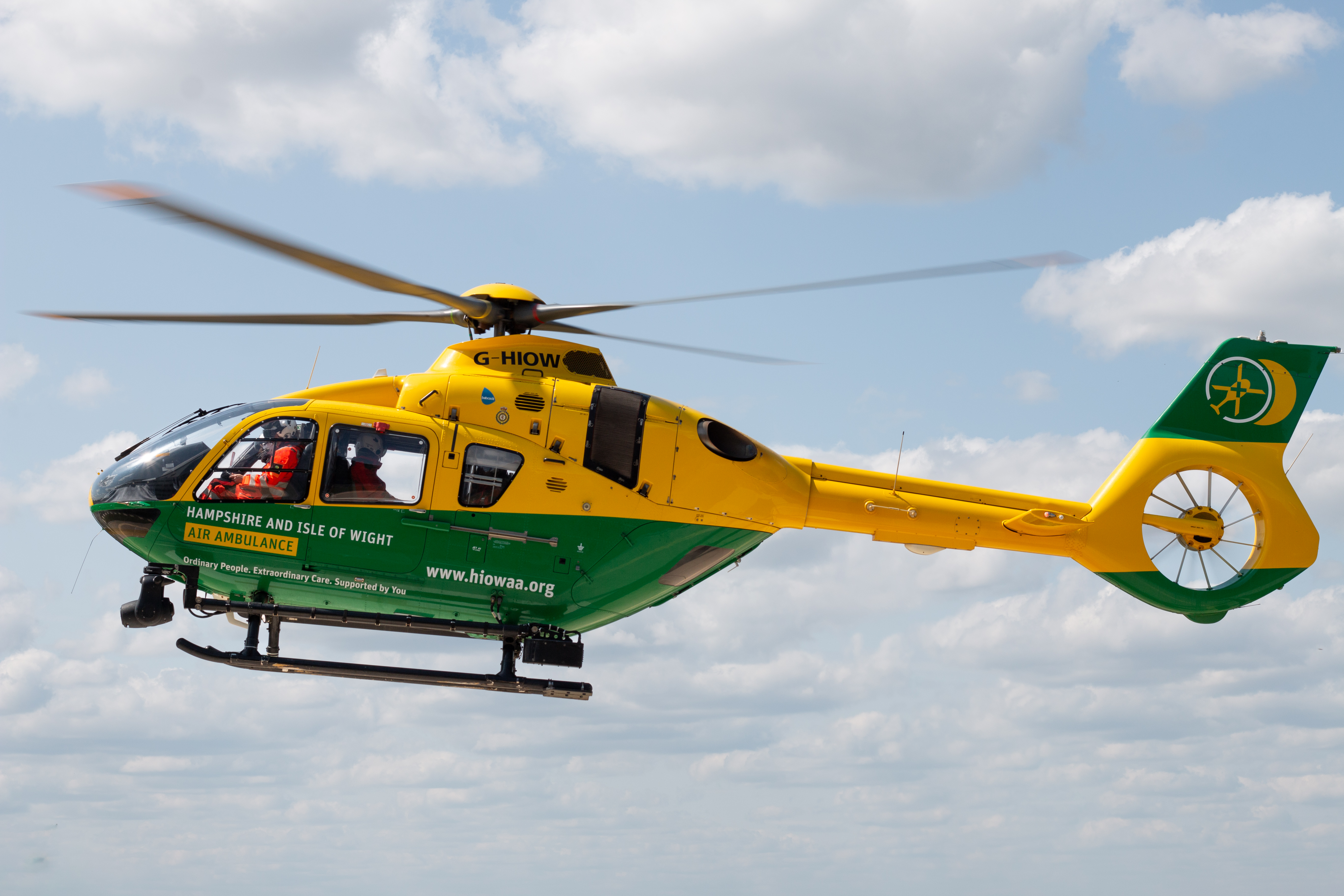
- The charity's EC135 helicopter
- Established: 1 July 2007
- Type: Charitable organisation
- Registration no.: 1106234
- Headquarters: Southampton Airport, Hampshire, England
- Region served: Hampshire; Isle of Wight
- Revenue: £10.9 million (2024)
- Employees: 31 (2024)
- Volunteers: 181 (2024)
- Website: www.hiowaa.org

Hampshire and Isle of Wight Air Ambulance is an air ambulance service serving the counties of Hampshire and Isle of Wight in South East England. It is one of a number of air ambulance services in the United Kingdom.

The service began operating on 1 July 2007. In April 2021, it reached 10,000 missions. The charity's Operating Base is located at Southampton Airport .

== Service ==
The service covers the counties of Hampshire and Isle of Wight and responds where required to major trauma injuries and other incidents in need of a fast response/transfer to hospital. Since early 2016, it has operated an Airbus H135 helicopter, which is capable of night missions. This helicopter now allows the service to operate helicopter emergency medical service (HEMS) during both daylight and darkness hours from 7 am to 2 am, 365 days a year.

In addition to the helicopter, a critical care car (CCC) is operational during the same hours, carrying both a doctor and paramedic - allowing the charity to double the number of patients it attends to. The CCC is a Volvo XC90, with a personalised numberplate, HA10 WAA, an acronym for the charity's name, which was donated anonymously.

The charity has a partnership with Thames Valley Air Ambulance, both of which cover the area that South Central Ambulance Service covers, allowing each service to cover 19 hours for 16 consecutive nights. This means Hampshire, Isle of Wight, Berkshire, Oxfordshire and Buckinghamshire all have HEMS cover 19 hours a day.

In the year ending September 2024, the charity raised £10.2 million and spent £11.2M, of which £7.4M was used to fund the air ambulance service.

== Helicopter and crew ==
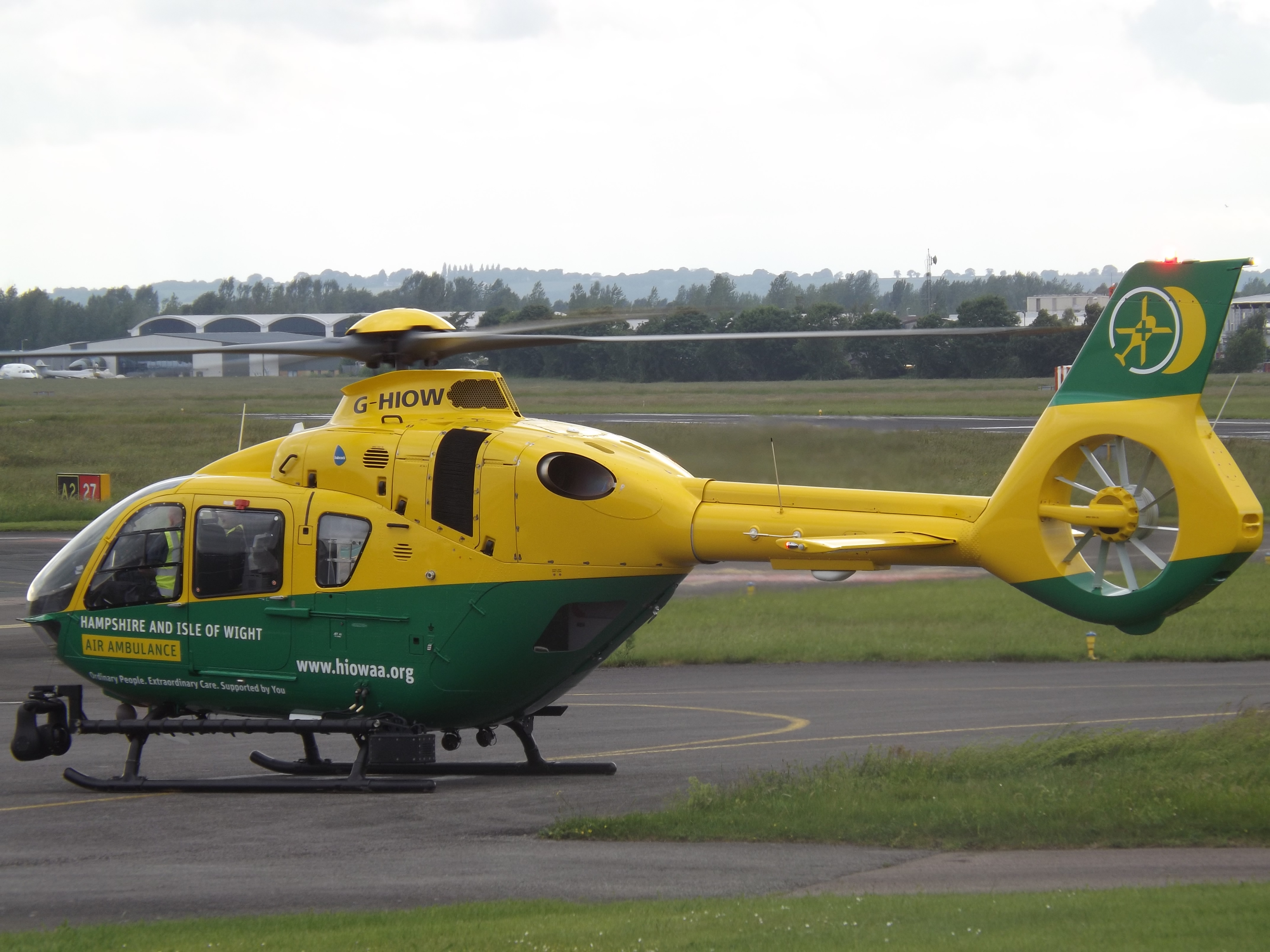
The current H&IOW Air Ambulance - G-HIOW - an Airbus H135

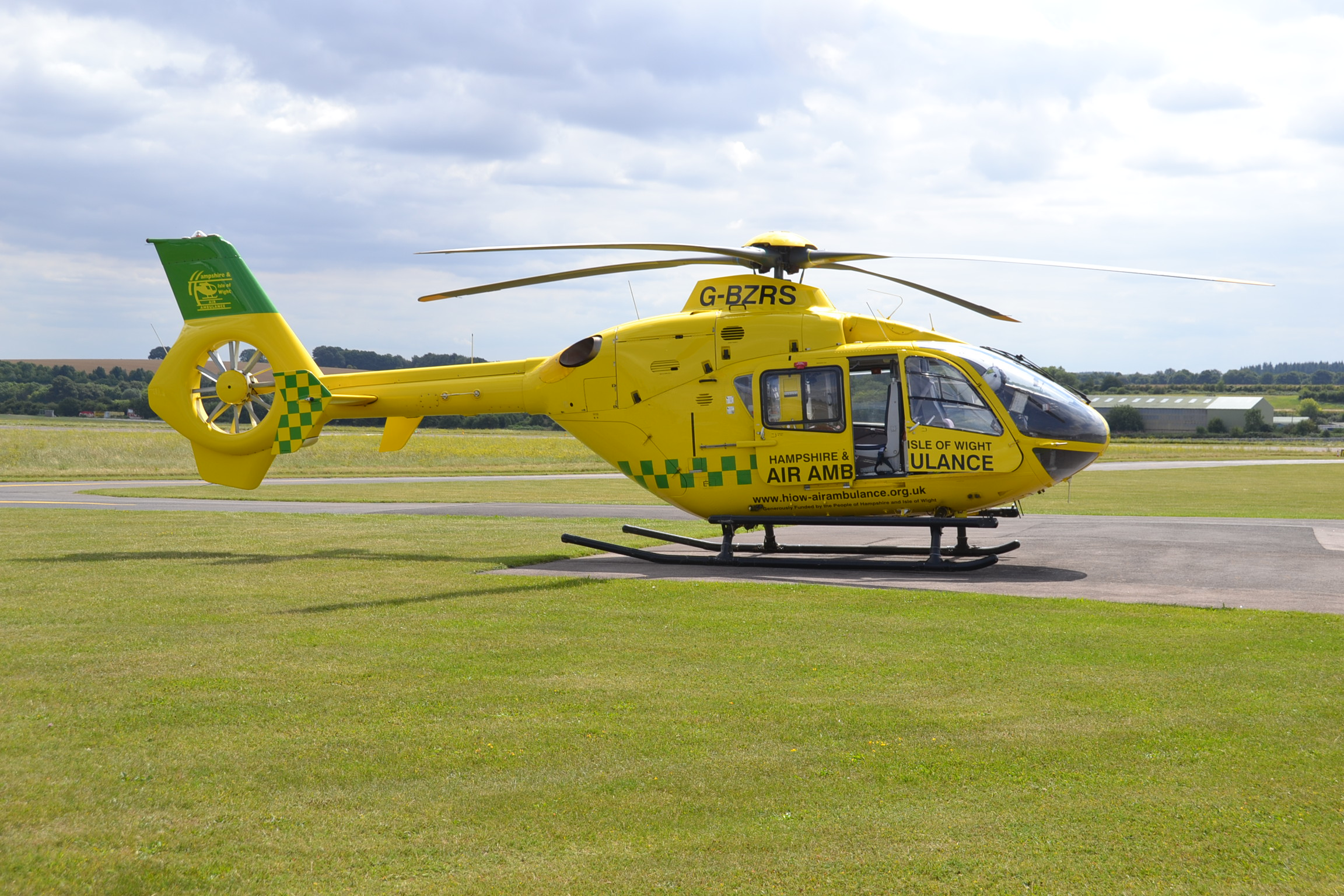
Past Hampshire and Isle of Wight Air Ambulance, pictured at Thruxton Airfield, Hampshire

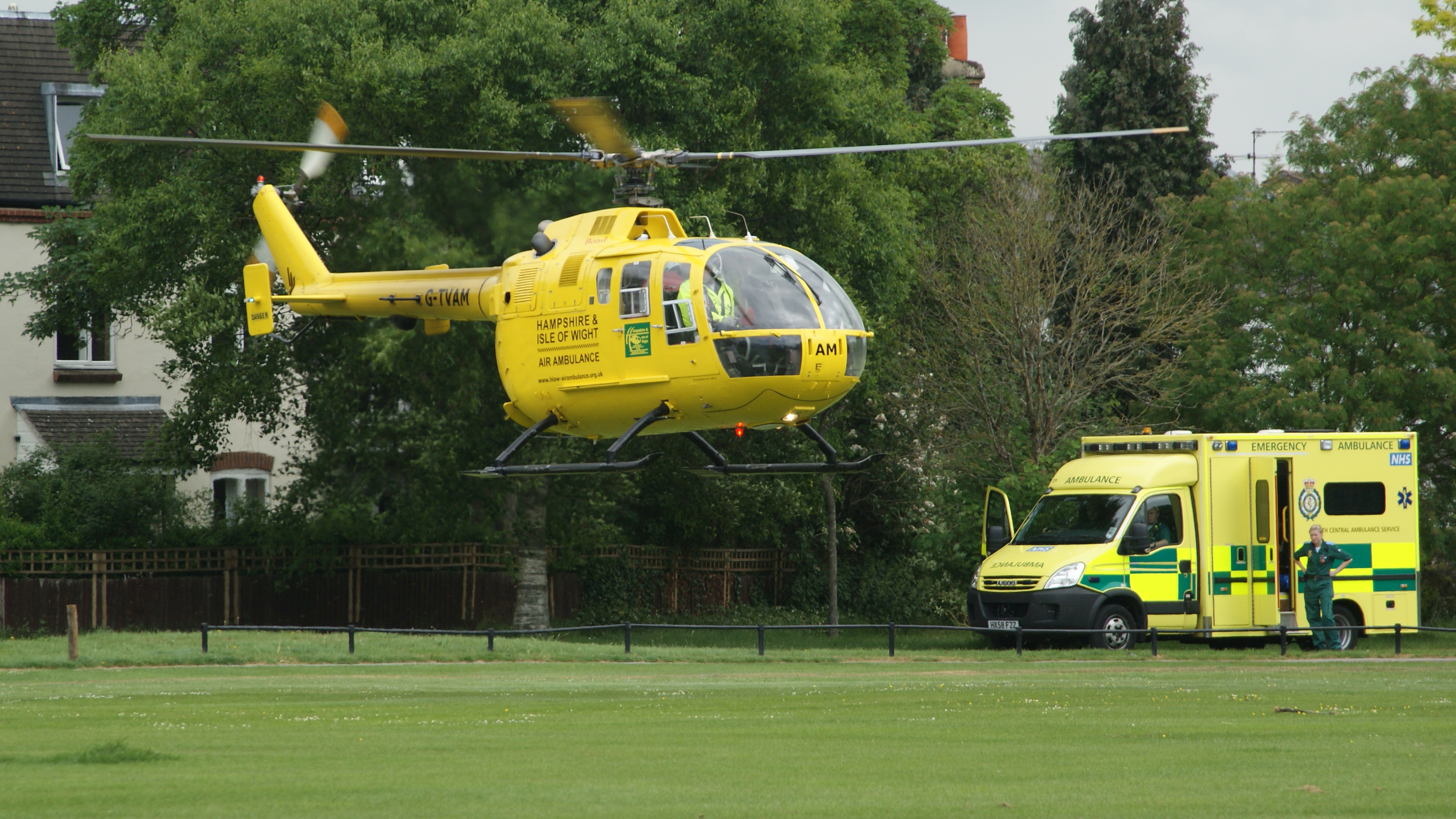
The former Hampshire and Isle of Wight Air Ambulance, pictured at Victoria Park, Newbury

The current helicopter is a twin-engined Airbus H135, a type often utilised as an air ambulance. It is usually airborne within four minutes and flies at a cruise speed of 157 mph (253 km/h; 136 kn), allowing it to reach most locations in Hampshire within 15 minutes, though flights to the Isle of Wight may take longer.

The H135 replaced its predecessor, a 33-year-old MBB Bo 105, in September 2010. The H135 can carry a crew of up to four, but typically carries two paramedics and one pilot. An additional doctor or family member of the patient may occupy the fourth seat.

In October 2015, a new H135 replaced the previous one. It is powered by two Turbomeca Arrius 2BPLUS engines, has a range of 432 nautical miles (800 km; 497 mi) and an endurance of roughly 4.5 hours. The helicopter is fitted with two Garmin GPS systems, moving map displays, two iPad minis, a power line detection system, night vision goggles and a Trakka Systems A800 high intensity searchlight. It is capable of night flying.

The air ambulance is always crewed by a pilot, a doctor and critical care paramedic, and sometimes an additional paramedic.
