= Air ambulance services in the United Kingdom =

Healthcare providers

Air ambulance services in the United Kingdom provide emergency air medical services, patient transport between specialist centres, or medical repatriation. Services are provided by a mixture of organisations, operating either helicopters or fixed-wing aircraft. All emergency air ambulance helicopters in England, Wales, and Northern Ireland are operated by charities, while Scotland has one charity service with two helicopters in addition to its two NHS-funded helicopters. Fixed-wing air ambulances, used for patient transport, may be government or privately operated. Air ambulance helicopters are complemented by Coastguard SAR helicopters.

Operational bases in England and Wales

== History ==
The first air ambulance services in the UK commenced in Scotland in November 1933, with a flight from Wideford Airport, Kirkwall, Orkney. The first night time ambulance flight was undertaken in February 1939, from Wideford to the island of Sanday, using car headlights to help take off and landing. The aircraft used was a General Aircraft Monospar, registration G-ACEW, operated by Highland Airways.

The first air ambulance charity to operate a helicopter was Cornwall Air Ambulance in 1987. There are now 21 air ambulance charities in the UK.

== Emergency air ambulances ==
Emergency air ambulances are generally helicopter based, and used to respond to medical emergencies in support of local ambulance services. In England, Wales, and Northern Ireland, all of these services are charitably funded, and either directly owned by the charity, or operated under contract with a private provider. The ambulance staff and doctors crewing these flights are generally seconded from the local NHS ambulance service and NHS hospitals. In Scotland, there is the only publicly-funded air ambulance service, with the Scottish Ambulance Service operating two Airbus Helicopters H145 helicopters and two fixed wing aircraft in this role, alongside two charity-funded Eurocopter EC135 helicopters, operated by Scotland's Charity Air Ambulance.

Organisation	Aircraft
Cornwall Air Ambulance	2 x AW169
The Air Ambulance Service	2 x AW109SP, 2 x AW169
Devon Air Ambulance	H145, EC135
Dorset and Somerset Air Ambulance	2 x AW169
East Anglian Air Ambulance	2 x H145
Essex & Herts Air Ambulance	2 x AW169
Great North Air Ambulance	AS365 N3+, AS365 N3
Great Western Air Ambulance	EC135
Hampshire and Isle of Wight Air Ambulance	H135
Air Ambulance Kent Surrey Sussex	3 x AW169
Lincolnshire & Nottinghamshire Air Ambulance	AW169
London's Air Ambulance	2 x H135
Magpas Air Ambulance	AW109SP
Midlands Air Ambulance	2 x H145, EC135
North West Air Ambulance	3 x EC135
Northern Ireland Air Ambulance	2 x AW109SP
Scotland's Charity Air Ambulance	H145, |EC135
Scottish Air Ambulance	2 x H145, 2 x King Air 200C
Thames Valley Air Ambulance	EC135
Wales Air Ambulance and Children's Wales Air Ambulance	5 x H145
Wiltshire and Bath Air Ambulance Charity	Bell 429
Yorkshire Air Ambulance	3 x H145 D3

== Patient transport operations ==
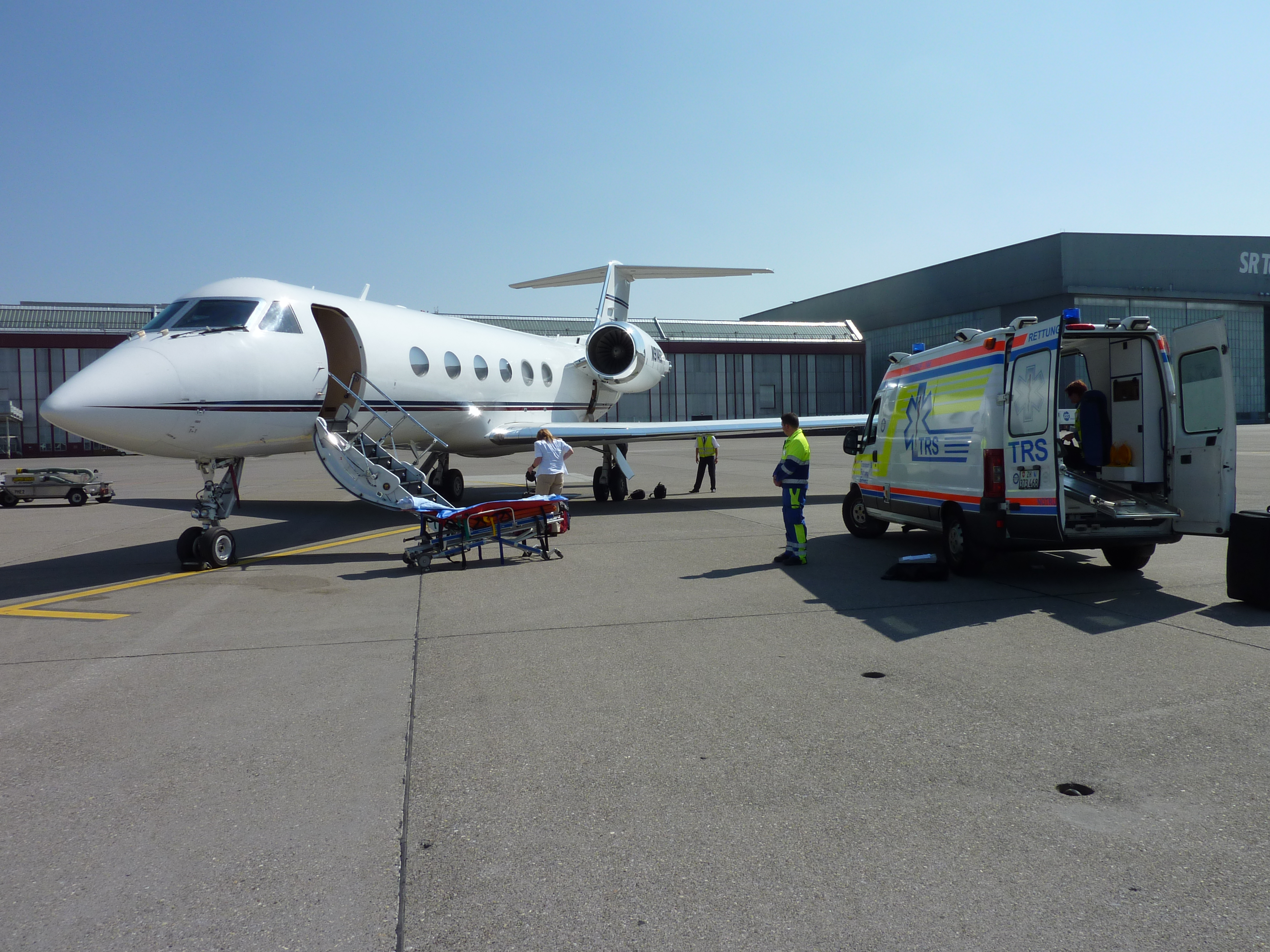
Privately operated fixed wing air ambulance from the UK

There are also a number of public and private patient transport operations in the UK, generally using fixed wing aircraft, and which are part of a system of moving patients between points of care, or as part of a repatriation to the UK. SkyAngels Air Ambulance charity, flying out of Norwich International Airport [NWI], is a dedicated patient air transfer service with one helicopter and a number of fixed-winged aircraft under contracts to provide a service to the NHS. There is a helicopter based patient transfer service, focused on paediatric cases, called the Children's Air Ambulance, which first flew in 2012.

The Scottish Ambulance Service operates two fixed wing aircraft in this role, with patients flown to the mainland UK for treatment. In 2015, the neonatal, paediatric and adult emergency care and retrieval operations were brought together with the Scottish Ambulance Service and utilise the aircraft and road ambulances for this purpose. They are co-located at the Scottish Ambulance Air Base at Glasgow International Airport.

The Isle of Man Department of Health and Social Care operates a fixed-wing air ambulance for patient transport between the island and mainland hospitals.

The Channel Islands of Guernsey and Jersey have a Beechcraft King Air B200 air ambulance, operated by Gama Aviation since July 2020, that transports patients to England for treatment that they cannot receive on the islands. In Jersey this is coordinated by the Jersey Emergency Transport Service (JETS). In addition, Aurigny operate a medical evacuation service from Alderney to Guernsey.

== Notable accidents involving air ambulances ==
- On 19 May 1996, a Britten-Norman BN-2 Islander aircraft operated by Loganair for the Scottish Ambulance Service crashed short of the runway at Lerwick/Tingwall Airport in Shetland while turning to final approach at night during strong and gusting winds. The pilot was killed, and the physician and flight nurse were injured. There was no patient on board at the time.
- On 26 July 1998, the three man crew of the Kent Air Ambulance died when the aircraft collided with power lines and crashed in a field in Burham, near Rochester Airport. Initial investigation established no definitive cause for the crash, due to the fireball produced on impact. Controversy ensued when the pilot's employers, Police Aviation Services, denied liability. On 19 February 2004, following a civil case brought by the pilot's widow to the High Court in Manchester, it ruled that the crash was caused by mechanical failure, not as suggested flying low for fun, and ordered compensation to be paid.
- On 14 June 2000, four passengers and one pilot were killed when a Piper PA-31-350 Navajo Chieftain, chartered for a medical transfer from the Isle of Man, crashed on approach to Liverpool Airport.
- On 15 March 2005, a Britten-Norman BN-2 Islander aircraft operated by Loganair crashed into the sea while descending toward Campbeltown Airport in western Scotland. The aircraft was operating an air ambulance flight on behalf of the Scottish Ambulance Service. The pilot and paramedic both died in the crash.

== See also ==
- Aviation in the United Kingdom
- Police aviation in the United Kingdom
- Emergency medical services in the United Kingdom
- Motorcycle ambulance
