= Thames Valley Air Ambulance =

English charity air ambulance

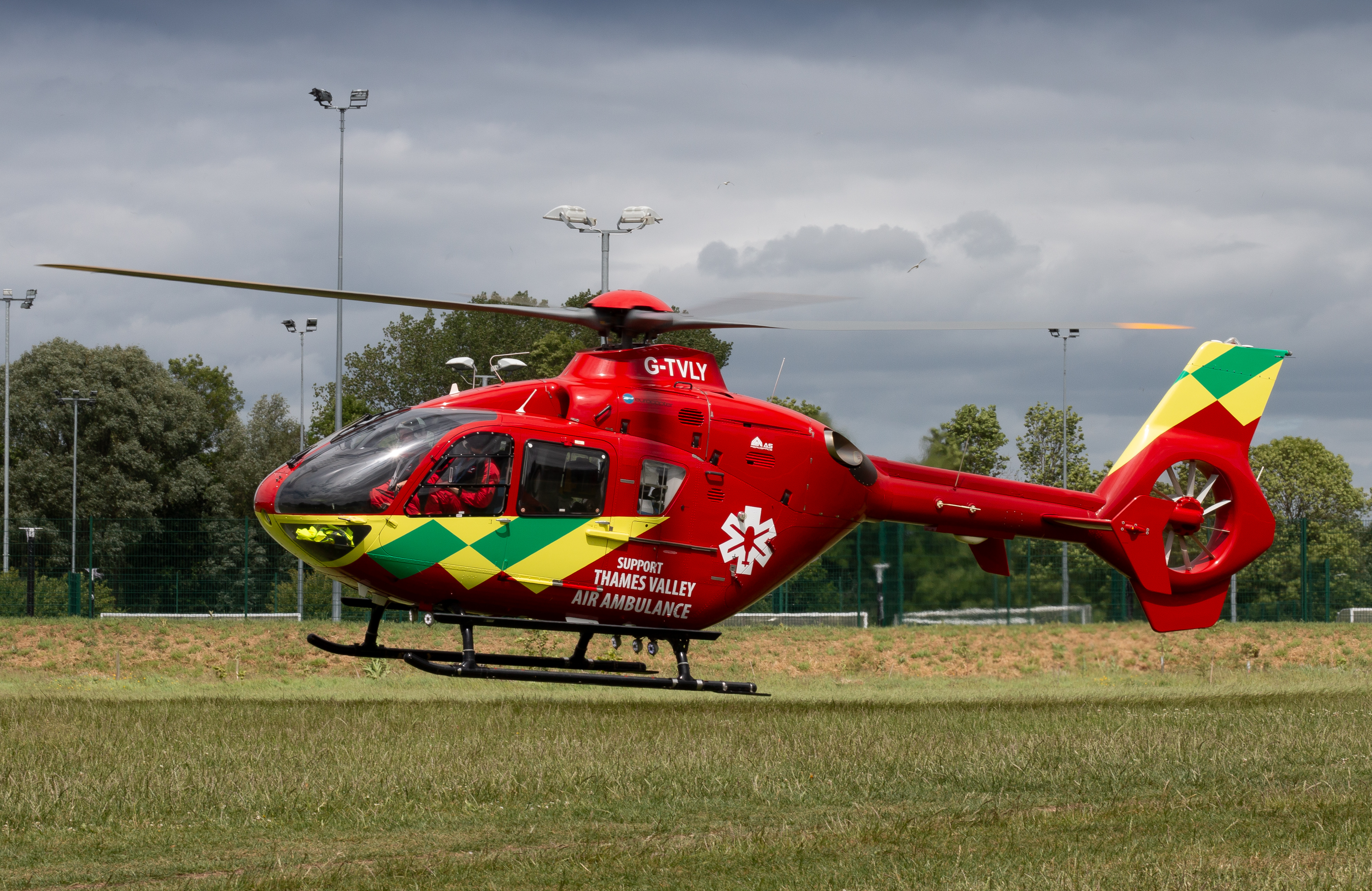
- The charity's EC135 helicopter
- Established: 2011
- Legal status: Registered charity
- Headquarters: Stokenchurch, Buckinghamshire, England
- Region served: Berkshire; Buckinghamshire; Oxfordshire
- Royal patron: Sophie, Duchess of Edinburgh
- Revenue: £12.2 million (2024)
- Staff: 128 (2024)
- Volunteers: 103 (2024)
- Website: www.tvairambulance.org.uk

The Thames Valley Air Ambulance (TVAA), previously the Thames Valley and Chiltern Air Ambulance, is an organisation providing emergency medical services through the provision of a helicopter-based air ambulance covering the counties of Berkshire, Buckinghamshire and Oxfordshire in the South East England region.

== Operations ==
The charity's helicopter, which is night-capable, is a Eurocopter EC135, registered G-TVLY, operating between 7 am and 2 am. It is based at RAF Benson – roughly halfway between Oxford and Reading – with two pilots and a medical team. It also operates five emergency response vehicles (ERV), which, like the helicopter, carries a doctor and paramedic.

In the year ending March 2024, TVAA's income was £12.2 million, against expenditure of £12.2M, of which £7.9M was spent on operating the charitable emergency service. In 2019, TVAA responded to 2,670 incidents.

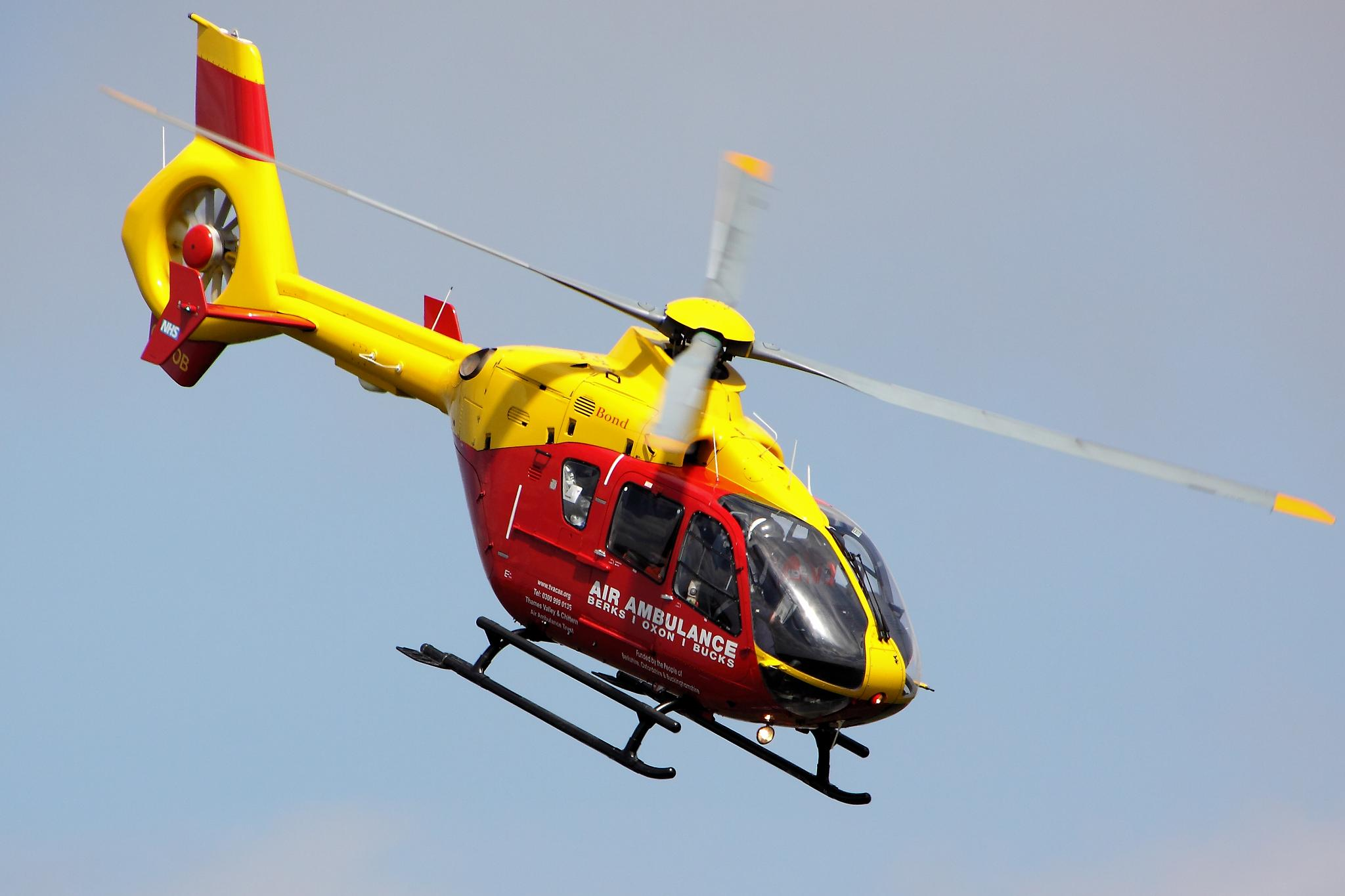
G-HBOB, the previous helicopter used by the charity

== Media ==
In 2018, the charity appeared on Channel 4's TV programme Emergency Helicopter Medics, which follows the crews responding and treating emergency patients. Other air ambulances that featured in the show include Great North Air Ambulance and East Anglian Air Ambulance.

== See also ==
- Air ambulance services in the United Kingdom
