= Sar, Iran =

Sar (Persian: سار) may refer to:

- Sar, East Azerbaijan
- Sar, Isfahan
- Sar, Kuhpayeh, Isfahan Province
- Sar, Semnan
- Sar, Sistan and Baluchestan
