= Šarce =

Šarce Шарце (Serbian)
- Village
- Location within Serbia
- Coordinates: 42°53′50″N 21°44′12″E
- Country: Serbia
- District: Jablanica District
- Municipality: Lebane

Population (2002)
  - Total: 88
- Time zone: UTC+1 (CET)
  - Summer (DST): UTC+2 (CEST)

Šarce is a village in the municipality of Lebane, Serbia. According to the 2002 census, the village has a population of 88 people.
