= Sar (surname) =

Sar is a surname. Notable people with the surname include:

- Abdoulaye Sar
- Edwin van der Sar (born 1970), Dutch association football goalkeeper
- Franco Sar (1933–2018), Italian Olympic decathlete
- Maya Sar (born 1981), Bosnian singer-songwriter
- Nikhilananda Sar (born 1936), Indian politician
- Pol Pot (1925–1998, born Saloth Sar), Cambodian dictator
