= The Air Ambulance Service =

English charity air ambulance

- Abbreviation: TAAS
- Formation: 2002; 24 years ago
- Registration no.: England and Wales: 1098874
- Legal status: Registered charity
- Headquarters: Blue Skies House, Butlers Leap, Rugby, Warwickshire, CV21 3RQ
- Coordinates: 52.3786°N 1.2365°W
- Region served: England, Wales, Scotland
- Key people: Peta Wilkinson (CEO); Professor Bob Allison (Chair)
- Revenue: £34 million (2022)
- Employees: 421 (2022)
- Volunteers: 1250 (2022)
- Website: theairambulanceservice.org.uk

The Air Ambulance Service (TAAS) is a registered charity that operates three emergency air ambulance services in the United Kingdom; the Warwickshire & Northamptonshire Air Ambulance (WNAA), the Derbyshire, Leicestershire & Rutland Air Ambulance (DLRAA), and the Children's Air Ambulance (TCAA).

The Air Ambulance Service Logos

Warwickshire, Northamptonshire, Derbyshire, Leicestershire & Rutland Air Ambulance logo

Children's Air Ambulance logo

== Operations ==
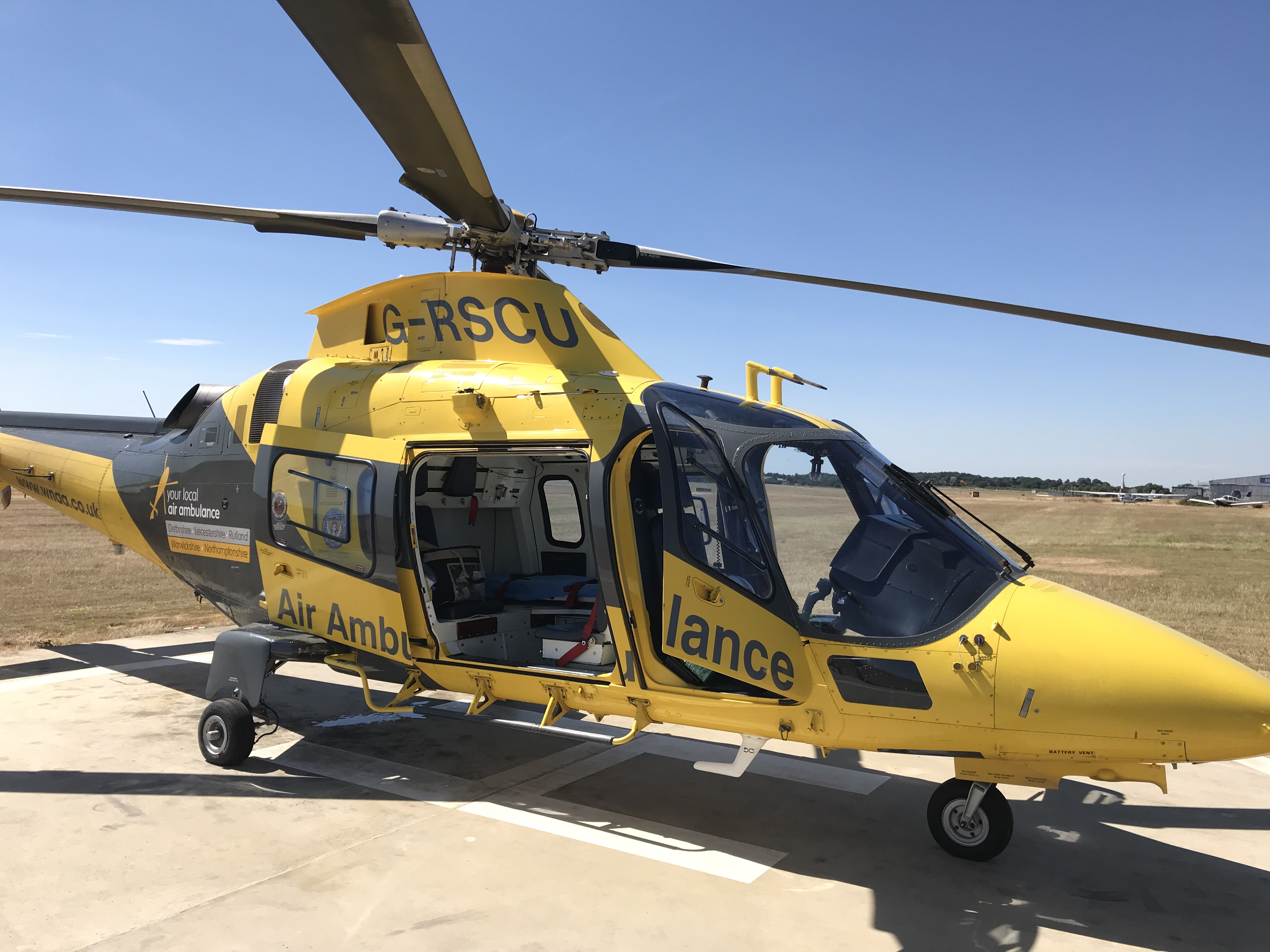
G-RSCU, The Warwickshire & Northamptonshire Air Ambulance's previous aircraft

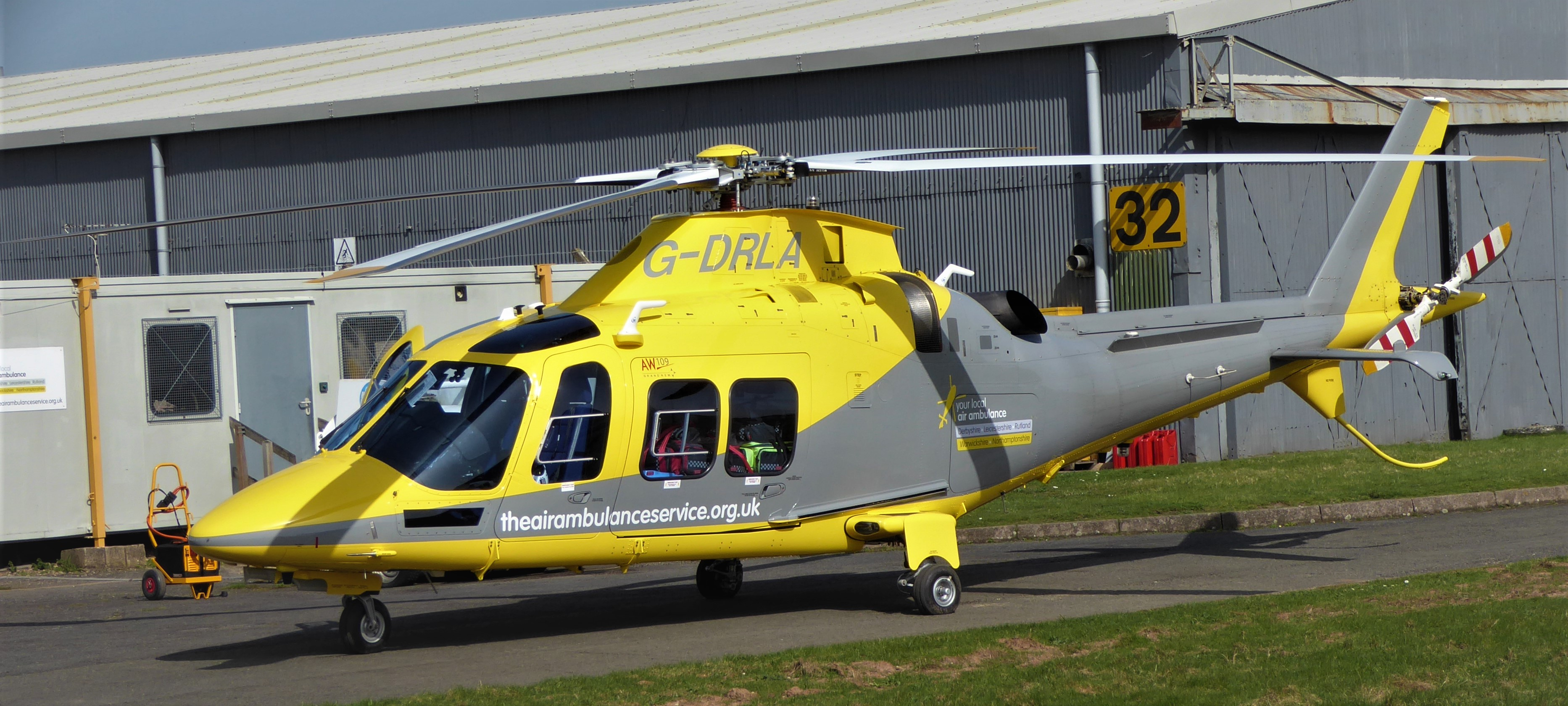
G-DRLA, The Derbyshire, Leicestershire & Rutland Air Ambulance

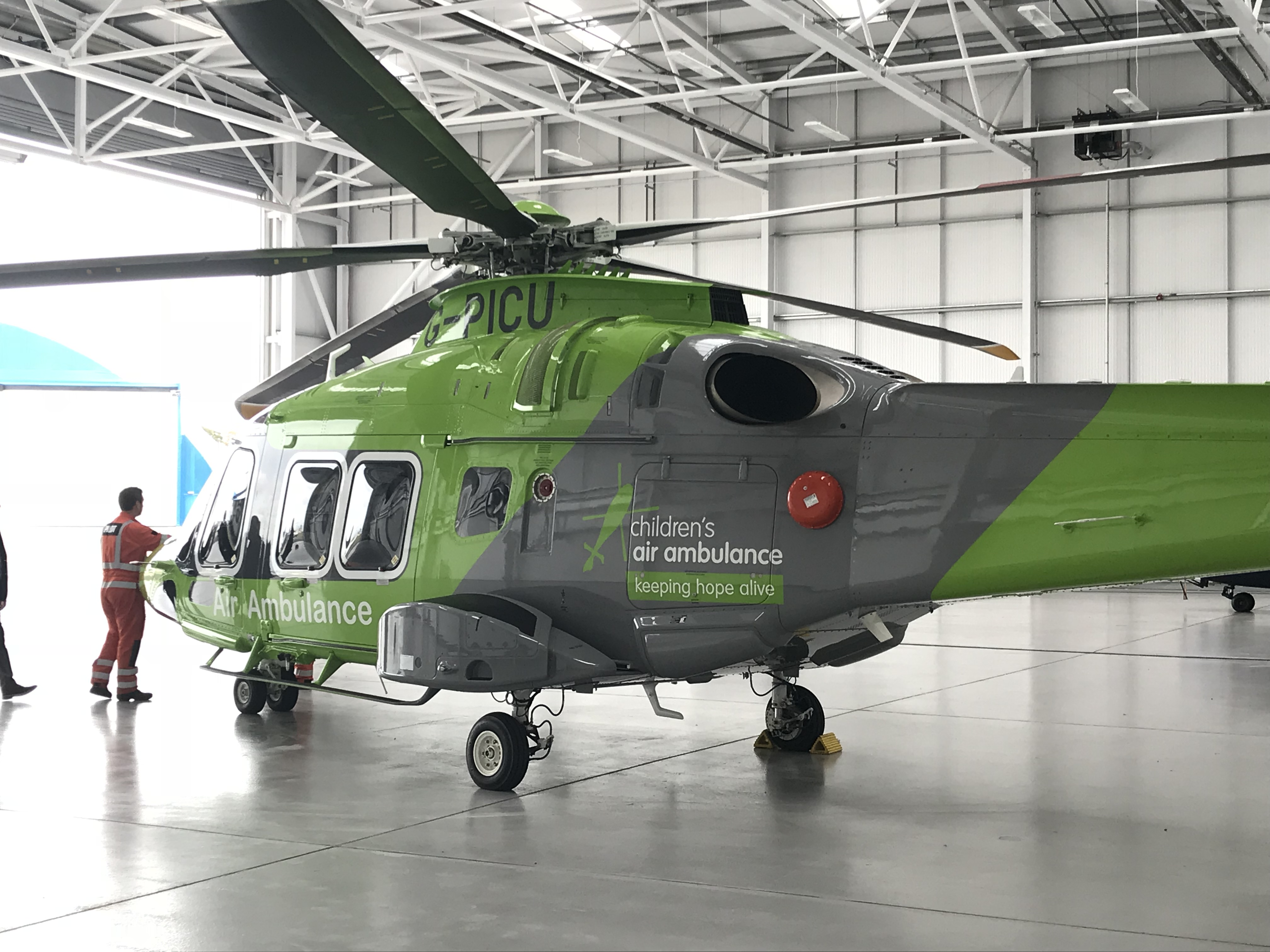
G-PICU, The Children's Air Ambulance's (South) previous aircraft

The charity runs three services, two are emergency helicopters covering Warwickshire & Northamptonshire and Derbyshire, Leicestershire & Rutland, and the third is the Children's Air Ambulance that covers Great Britain and provides an emergency transfer service for seriously ill babies and children.

While they primarily operate in their designated counties, WNAA and DLRAA can attend incidents in the neighbouring counties of Nottinghamshire, Lincolnshire, Staffordshire and West Midlands when requested by their respective ambulance or air ambulance service if additional resources are needed, or their own are unavailable.

All three of the services operated are registered with the Care Quality Commission, whose reports have identified high standards of emergency care.

WNAA and DLRAA both fly with a pilot, a doctor and a critical care paramedic on board. The Children's Air Ambulance flies with two pilots, a medical crew member and a team of up to three NHS clinicians which includes at least one senior nurse and often a consultant. As a part of their contract to provide the aircraft, Sloane Helicopters also provides the pilots for the service.

The charity runs a retail operation for fundraising consisting of 54 shops. The retail head office and main warehouse is based in Kegworth, with a second warehouse in Daventry. The charity opened a superstore in Derbyshire in February 2019.

== Aircraft ==
The charity currently leases four aircraft; two AgustaWestland AW109SP, and two AgustaWestland AW169 helicopters from Sloane Helicopters Limited.

- G-WNAS (Helimed53) - an AW109SP based at Coventry Airport for the Warwickshire & Northamptonshire Air Ambulance.
- G-DRLA (Helimed54) - an AW109SP based at Nottingham Heliport for the Derbyshire, Leicestershire & Rutland Air Ambulance.
- G-NICU (Helimed80) - an AW169 based at Oxford Airport covering the south of the country for The Children's Air Ambulance.
- G-CPTZ (Helimed81) - an AW169 based at Retford Gamston Airport covering the north of the country for The Children's Air Ambulance.

The lease of the current AW109SP helicopters began in March 2021 after Sloane was awarded the 7 year contract in 2019. The contract also includes provision of a dedicated spare AW109SP helicopter for use when the primary aircraft are under maintenance, which is also completed by Sloane. The current AW169 aircraft entered service in December 2022 and early 2023 under a separate agreement after the previous contract with Specialist Aviation Services was terminated in September 2021 due to additional costs.

== Road vehicles ==
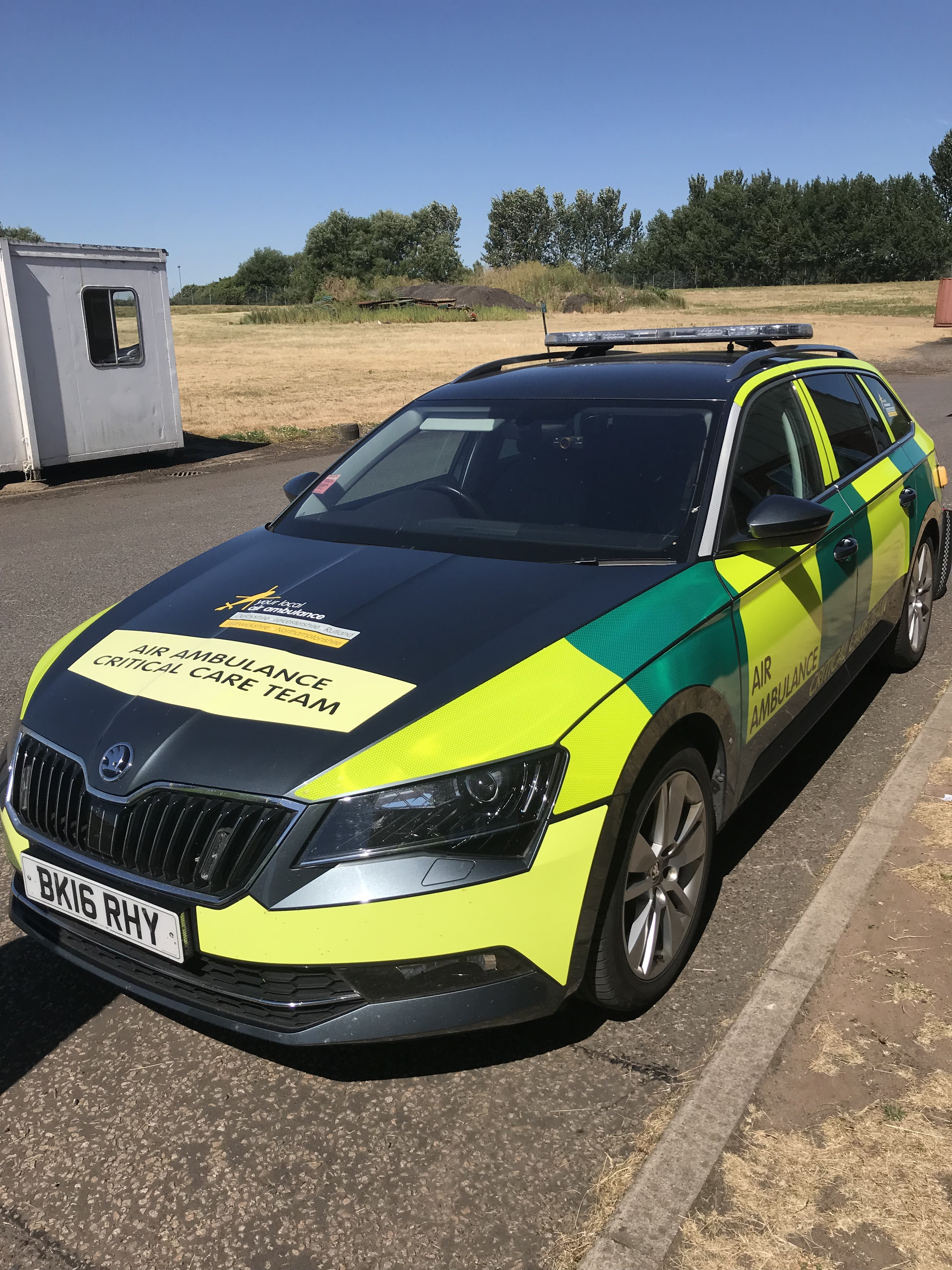
Critical Care RRV at Coventry Airport, similar to the type in use today

In addition to providing air ambulance services, the charity also operates two Skoda Kodiaq vRS 4x4 Critical Care Rapid Response Vehicles (RRV) daily. These are used to provide assistance and attend emergency incidents when the air ambulances are unavailable (including overnight when the aircraft cannot fly). The RRV's carry the same equipment as the helicopters including a defibrillator/cardiac monitor, CPR machine and kit bags containing medical consumables and drugs.

== History ==
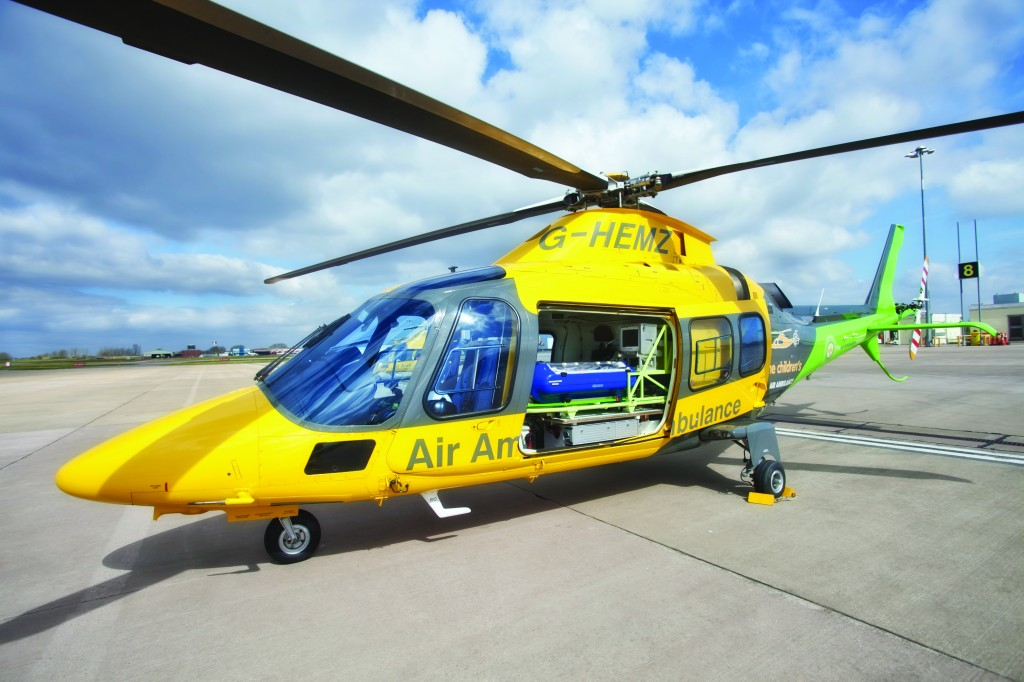
G-HEMZ, the former Children's Air Ambulance helicopter at Coventry Airport.

Warwickshire & Northamptonshire Air Ambulance was launched in 2002. By 12 June 2004, it had already flown its 1,000th mission. Just over two years later, on 10 October 2006, they had completed 5,000 incidents.

In 2008, the charity took over Derbyshire, Leicestershire & Rutland Air Ambulance, which had been struggling to raise funds. The service now serves over 3,850 square miles (10,000 km^{2}) Less than a year after Derbyshire, Leicestershire & Rutland Air Ambulance became the sister service to Warwickshire & Northamptonshire Air Ambulance, it flew its 1,000th mission on 17 January 2009.

At the beginning of 2010, Warwickshire & Northamptonshire Air Ambulance flew its 10,000th mission. The same year, the charity branched out into the retail sector, opening its first high street charity boutique in Rugby, Warwickshire.

In 2011, the two air ambulance services were brought together under the umbrella name of The Air Ambulance Service. In July of the same year, they were registered with the Care Quality Commission.

In 2012, the service started independently employing their paramedics full-time. The charity also launched a national recycling scheme and launched the Children's Air Ambulance.

On 12 May 2013, the Children's Air Ambulance carried out their first baby transfer. Derbyshire, Leicestershire & Rutland also flew its 5,000th mission on 5 June, following four years of service.

In October 2014, the Children's Air Ambulance carried out its 100th transfer.

In September 2018, two new AgustaWestland 169 helicopters entered service with the Children's Air Ambulance. The new helicopters are significantly larger and higher specification than the previous aircraft featuring bespoke clinical equipment and an additional seat for a parent to accompany the patient and crew on transfers.

== Funding and strategy ==
The Air Ambulance Service is an independent charity which receives no government funding. It raises funds from the general public, corporate supporters, lotteries and trusts. The charity also operates a chain of 57 shops which are based across the Midlands, M40 corridor and around London.

In 2013, the charity raised £11.1 million to fund its services.

In 2017, the charity raised £20.5M to fund its services. In the same year they spent £6.0M on charitable activities (30% of spending).

The charity is working to a new strategic plan covering the period 2015 to 2020. Its key strategic priorities are to continue to improve the quality of all its services and for the Children's Air Ambulance to be able to meet at least 90% of the demand for helicopter transfers between local hospitals and specialist paediatric centres.

== Criticisms ==
The Air Ambulance Service has been repeatedly criticised by the public, the Association of Air Ambulances, and other charities, for running fundraising and stock generation activities in areas covered by other air ambulance charities.

In 2013, the BBC published an insight into the charity, with previous employees of the charity as sources. The article stated that several thousands of pounds were spent on hiring Anton du Beke and Erin Boag to give dance classes to staff as a reward. The source, a former fundraising manager, also said that funds raised were largely spent on "the upkeep of the charity: salaries, cars, the recruitment of more and more senior personnel." And in some cases performance related bonuses. An investigation by the Charity Commission found that there had been a "lack of oversight" but only took advisory action. In their final report, the Charity Commission stated that "trustees have made good progress in improving the governance of the charity."

In March 2018, the charity was subject to allegations in The Sunday Times newspaper. The Charity Commission later announced it was re-opening its investigation as a result of the article.

As of March 2018, the Charity's membership of the Association of Air Ambulances is suspended due to an investigation by the Charity Commission.

== See also ==
- Air ambulances in the United Kingdom
