= Magpas =

English charity air ambulance

Magpas Air Ambulance
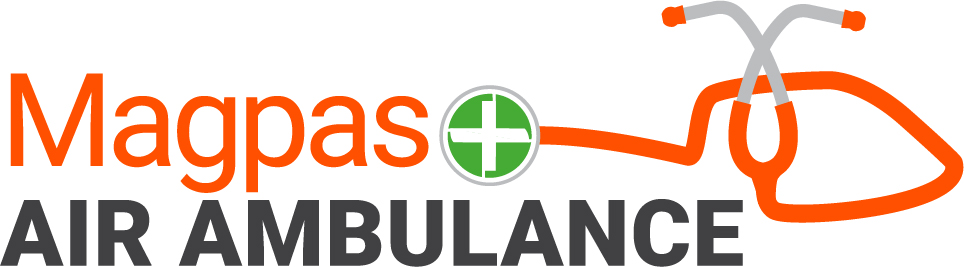

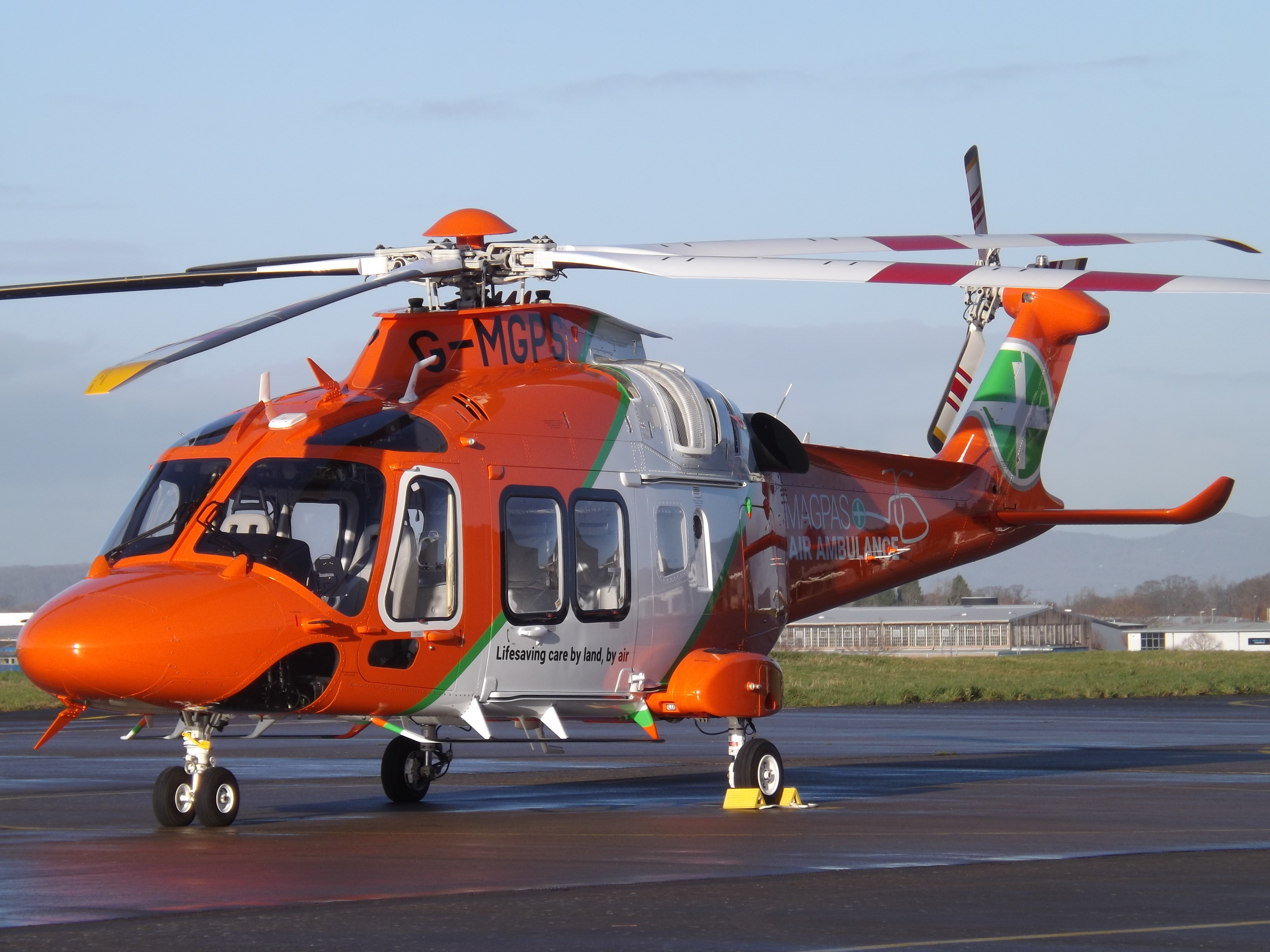
- Formation: 1 January 1971
- Type: Charitable organisation
- Legal status: Registered Charity 1119279
- Headquarters: Alconbury Weald, Cambridgeshire, England
- Coordinates: 52.3320°N 0.0631°W
- Region served: East of England
- Aircraft operated: Leonardo AW109SP
- CEO: Daryl Brown
- Revenue: £6.3 million (2024)
- Staff: 78 (2024)
- Volunteers: 90 (2024)
- Award: Queens Award for Voluntary Service
- Website: magpas.org.uk

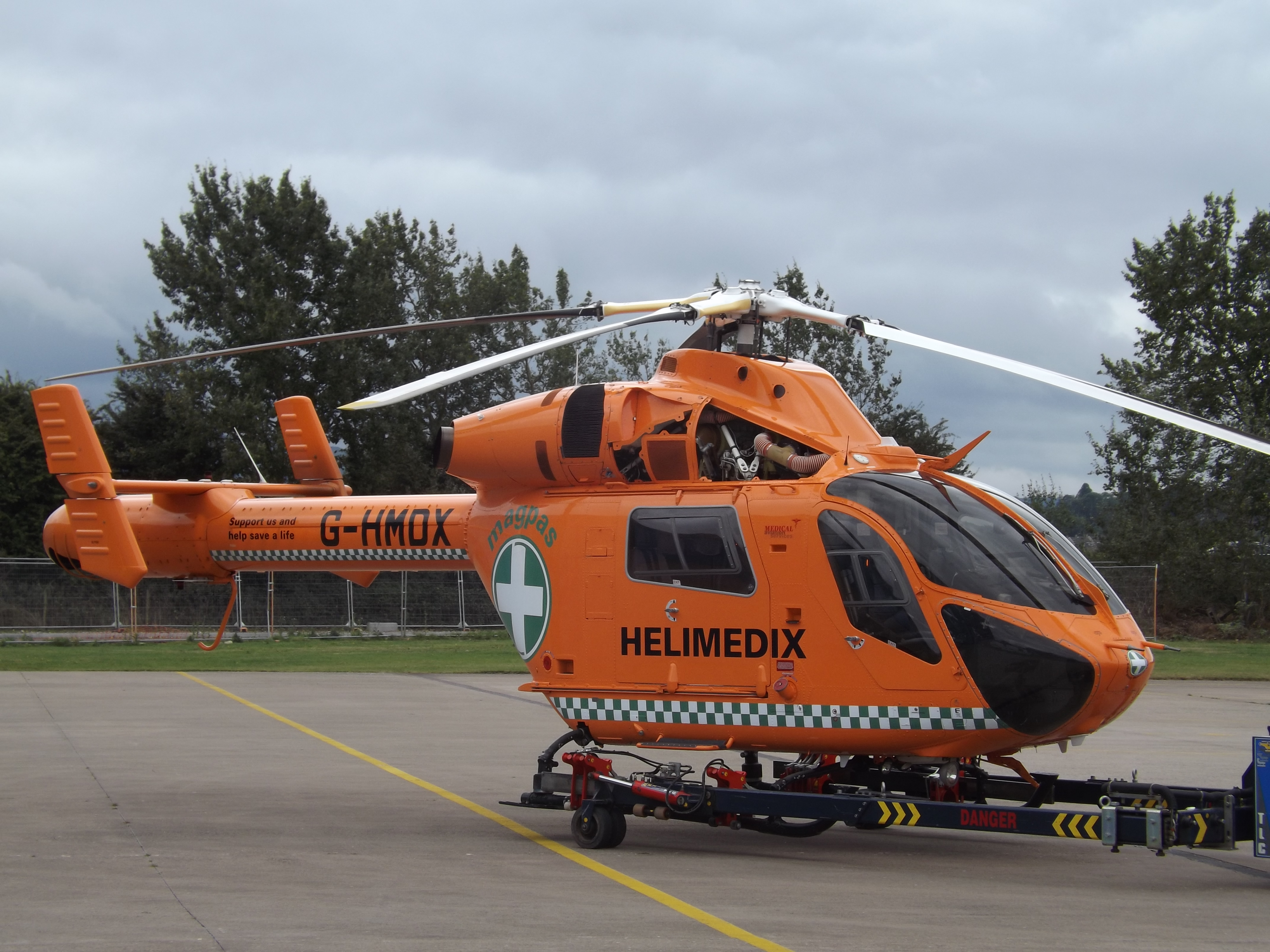
G-HMDX, MD902 Explorer, seen in 2016 with dual 'magpas' and 'Helimedix' logos, (since retired)

Magpas Air Ambulance is a registered charity that operates a helicopter emergency medical service (HEMS) in the East of England.

Founded in 1971, the charity operates a helicopter and three rapid response vehicles from its base in Huntingdon, Cambridgeshire. As of 2023, their staff consists of 80 employees and 70 volunteers. They are dispatched by both the East of England Ambulance Service and the East Midlands Ambulance Service.

== History ==
=== 20th century ===
Magpas Air Ambulance was founded in 1971 by doctors Neville Silverston and Derek Cracknell as the Mid Anglia General Practitioner Accident Service (MAGPAS). Its name derives from its close historical and geographical association with the Cambridgeshire Constabulary, then known as the Mid-Anglia Constabulary. The service was originally offered by general practitioners from across Cambridgeshire to provide quick medical care to victims of road accidents. The organisation became a registered charity in 1972.

In 1977, Magpas Air Ambulance contributed to the founding of the British Association for Immediate Care, of which the charity remains a member. In 1997, the charity entered a partnership with the Cambridgeshire Constabulary to use the police helicopter from RAF Wyton, near Huntingdon, Cambridgeshire. In 1999, the charity became the first service in the region to provide a night-time helicopter emergency medical service.

=== 21st century ===
In 2007, the East Anglian Air Ambulance agreed to provide a helicopter, dubbed Anglia Two, to be operate from RAF Wyton for daytime missions. Although this was withdrawn in 2010, Magpas Air Ambulance continued to provide the service in conjunction with the police.

Between 2000 and 2010, the charity developed a network of community first responder schemes across Cambridgeshire and Bedfordshire. These local volunteers were trained by Magpas to respond to medical emergencies in their local area and treat the patient until the ambulance service arrived. In 2010, the Magpas first responders were joined alongside other schemes under the leadership of the East of England Ambulance Trust, though the charity's volunteers were stood down in the same year.

In 2012, Magpas Air Ambulance began flying with its own helicopter, MD902 Explorer registration G-HMDX. This was replaced in December 2018 by AgustaWestland AW169 G-MGPS.

Magpas Air Ambulance was registered with the Healthcare Commission, and was inspected by the Care Quality Commission in March 2014. This looks at the charity's governance and care quality to ensure it meets national standards. In 2015, Magpas Air Ambulance announced that they would extend their hours of operation to 24/7 in 2016.

In 2024, Magpas acquired AgustaWestland 109SP G-MPAS. This was because their helicopter operator was sold and their AW169 was removed from service.

== Research ==
In partnership with the University Hospital of Leicester, Magpas runs the Cambridge Trauma and Audit Research Project (CTARP). This project looks to identify lessons from all cases of traumatic injury occurring in Cambridgeshire. This can then be used to improve the quality of care and examine ways to prevent incidents in the first place.

== Awards and nominations ==
In 2005, Magpas was given the Queen's Award for Voluntary Service. In 2022, clinicians from Magpas and the East of England Ambulance Service (EEAST) won the 999 Hero category in The Sun "Who Cares Wins" awards. In 2023, Magpas was given the Gold Award in the Defence Employer Recognition Scheme for its support of armed forces personnel.

== Facts and figures ==
In the year ending June 2025, the charity reported an income of £5.6 million. Expenditure was £6M, of which £3.9M (70%) was spent on operating the air ambulance service.

In 2025, the charity employed 71 people, four of whom earned more than £70,000, and had 85 volunteers.

== See also ==
- Air ambulances in the United Kingdom
