= Emergency Helicopter Medics =

- Genre: Documentary
- Country of origin: United Kingdom
- Original language: English
- No. of seasons: 5
- No. of episodes: 53

Production
- Running time: 47 minutes

Original release
- Network: Channel 4
- Release: 8 April 2018 – present

Emergency Helicopter Medics is a British documentary series that follows air ambulance teams responding to life-threatening emergencies.

The series follows teams from Great North, Essex and Herts, Thames Valley, East Anglian, and Warwickshire, Northamptonshire, Derbyshire, Leicestershire and Rutland Air Ambulances. Teams of doctors, critical care paramedics and pilots provide advanced critical care to the most seriously ill and injured people in the UK. All of the air ambulance services featured in the show are entirely charity funded.

== Production ==
The helicopters featured in the show are rigged with GoPro cameras which can be switched on when a call comes in. Directors also follow the action with a small handheld camera, and crew members are equipped with body cameras for filming up close.

Series producer Emma Fentiman said of the editing process:

“We choose the stories based on what will best reflect the variety of incidents and injuries that the air ambulances attend, as well as stories that showcase the warmth and humour that prevails - even in the most traumatic of circumstances. It then takes a two-person team around five to six weeks of editing to cut together one episode.”

== Episodes ==
=== Series overview ===
Series	Episodes	Originally released	
Series	Episodes	First released	Last released
1	10	8 April 2018	10 June 2018
2	9	3 March 2019	28 April 2019
3	11	10 November 2020	19 January 2021
4	10	22 May 2022	24 July 2022
5	TBA	21 May 2024	TBA
