= Bond Aviation Group =

British helicopter operator

- Type: Private
- Industry: Airline
- Founded: 1961; Ceased operating as Bond Aviation Group in 2016
- Headquarters: Staverton, England, United Kingdom
- Parent: Babcock International
- Subsidiaries: Bond Air Services; Bond Offshore Helicopters

Bond Aviation Group was a British helicopter operator based at Gloucestershire Airport, Staverton. It was purchased by Babcock International in 2014. It incorporated Bond Air Services, now renamed Babcock Mission Critical Services Onshore, and Bond Offshore Helicopters, now renamed Babcock Mission Critical Services Offshore.

Both companies held a United Kingdom Civil Aviation Authority Type B Operating Licence, and they were permitted to carry passengers, cargo and mail on aircraft with less than 20 seats. Bond mainly operated Eurocopter aircraft.

In October 2022 Peter Bond announced the return of Bond Helicopters in a joint venture with Gama Aviation, planning to commence operations with five AW139 out of Norwich in 2024 for the Anglo-French Oil and Gas company Perenco.

== History ==
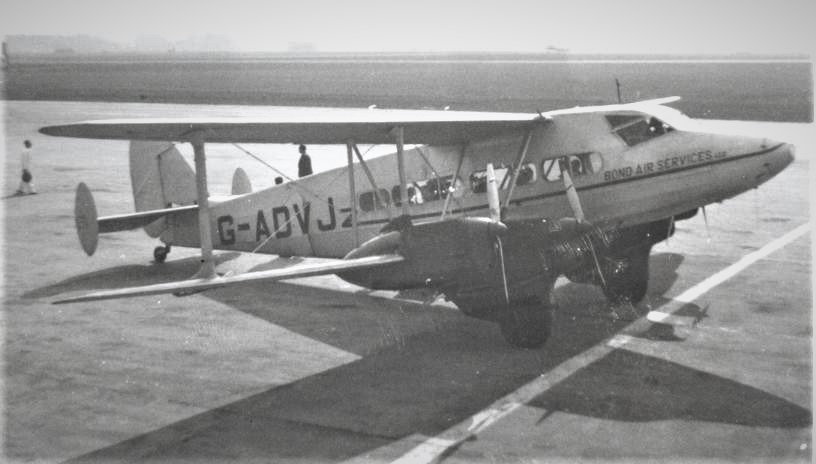
A DH.86 Express of Bond Air Services at Liverpool Airport on the day of the Grand National in 1950.

Founded in 1961 under the name of Management Aviation Limited, the company first entered the offshore transport industry in 1974, providing helicopters mainly in support of offshore oil and gas operations. By the late 1990s, Bond operated a fleet of over 200 helicopters. In 1995, the business was merged with Helikopter Service Group of Norway.

The group organisation was formed in 1999 when Bond was acquired from Helikopter Service Group. In 2014, the group's parent company, Avincis, was purchased by the Babcock International Group. All UK operations under the Bond name adopted the Babcock name in 2016.

== Bond Offshore Helicopters ==
In 2001, Bond Offshore Helicopters was formed at Aberdeen Airport to take advantage of the booming North Sea oil and gas, crew replacement requirement. In 2002, BP awarded Bond Offshore an offshore helicopter transport service contract, worth £120 million, to provide all of their Aberdeen based helicopter support operations.

In addition to the oil and gas industry service contract, Bond also operated a Search & Rescue operation in the North Sea.

The company operated the Eurocopter Super Puma AS332L2, Eurocopter 365N3 Dauphin, Eurocopter EC225 Super Puma II, and AgustaWestland AW139.

In 2013, four helicopter crewmembers were honoured for their role in the rescue of an oil industry vessel in the North Sea that had been struck by a wave during a storm.

In 2016, Bond Offshore Helicopters changed its name to Babcock Mission Critical Services Offshore

== Bond Air Services ==
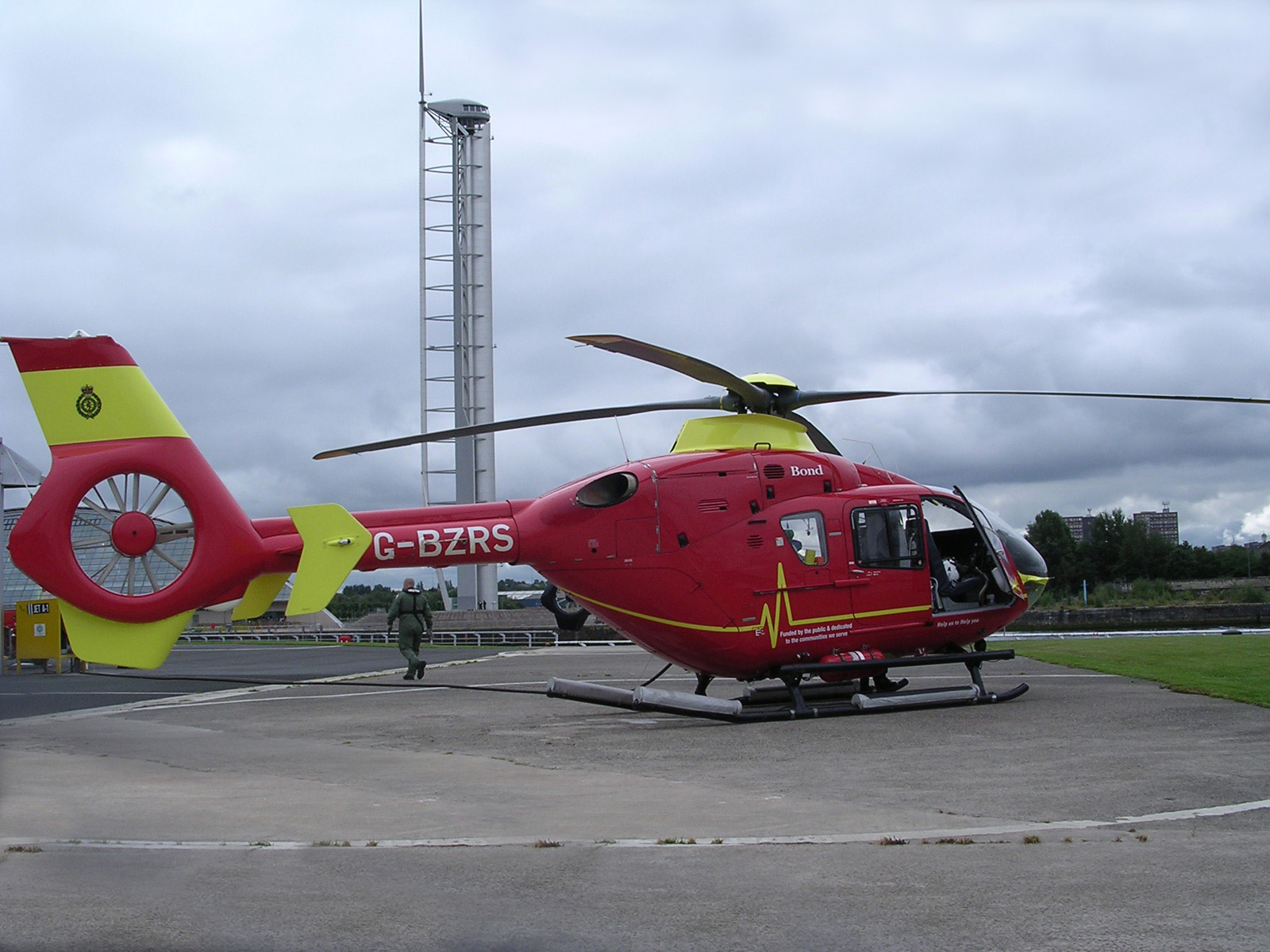
A Eurocopter EC-135 owned and operated by Bond Air Services air ambulance re-fuelling at Glasgow City Heliport in Western Scotland. Glasgow Science Tower in the background.

Bond Air Services was an operator of air ambulance and police aviation units in the UK. Using mainly Eurocopter EC-135 and MBB Bo 105 helicopters, they operated from 17 bases around the UK and had two headquarters, Staverton and Glasgow City Heliport.

In 2016, Bond Air Services changed its name to Babcock Mission Critical Services Onshore.
