= Bond Offshore Helicopters Flight 85N =

2009 helicopter accident

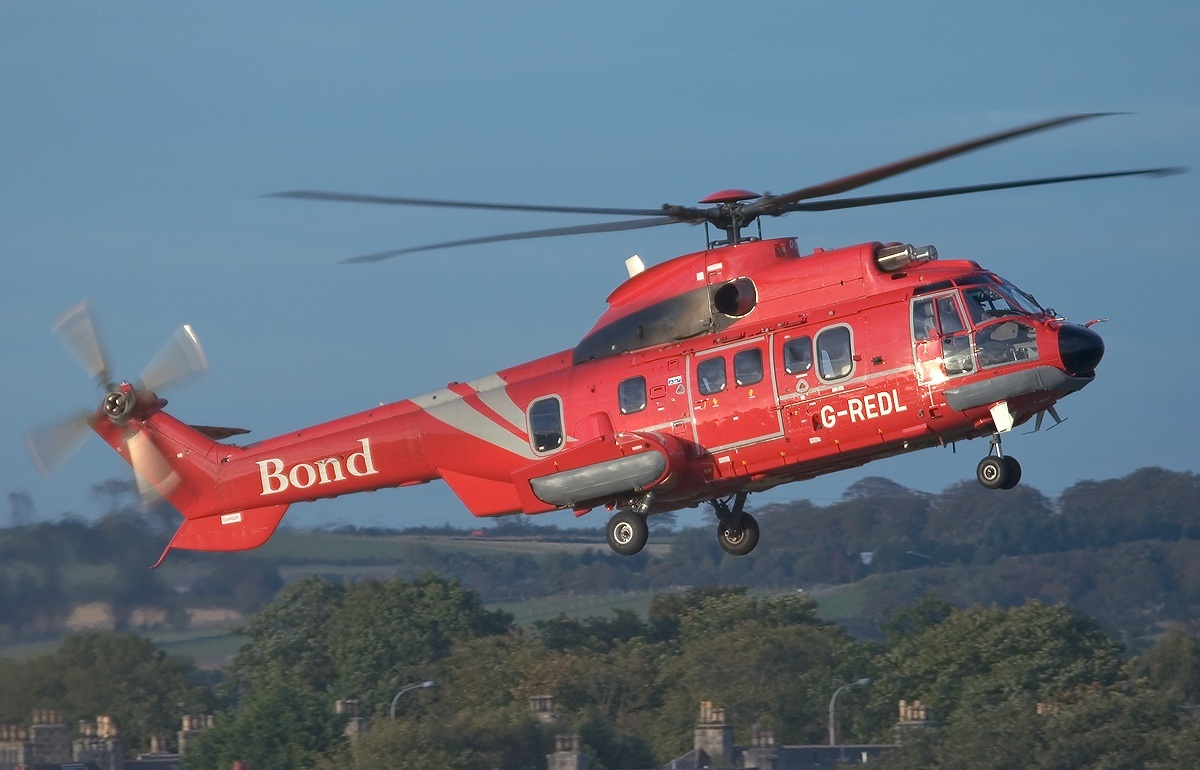
- G-REDL, the aircraft involved in the accident, seen September 2004

Accident
- Date: 1 April 2009
- Summary: Main rotor gearbox failure
- Site: 11 nmi (20 km) northeast of Peterhead, Scotland; 57.554°N -0.000°E

Aircraft
- Aircraft type: Eurocopter AS332L2 Super Puma
- Operator: Bond Offshore Helicopters
- Registration: G-REDL
- Flight origin: Aberdeen Airport
- Last stopover: Miller oilfield
- Destination: Aberdeen Airport
- Passengers: 14
- Crew: 2
- Fatalities: 16
- Survivors: 0

Just before 2:00 pm on 1 April 2009, Bond Offshore Helicopters Flight 85N crashed 11 nautical miles (20 km) north-east of Peterhead, Scotland in the North Sea while returning from a BP oil platform in the Miller oilfield, 240 km (150 mi) north-east of Peterhead. The crash killed all sixteen people aboard. The flight was operated using a Eurocopter AS332L2 Super Puma Mk 2 belonging to Bond Offshore Helicopters. The cause of the crash was main rotor separation following a catastrophic gearbox failure.

== Passengers and crew ==
The helicopter was flown by Captain Paul Burnham and co-pilot Richard Menzies, both working for Bond Offshore Helicopters. Most of the victims were employees of KCA Deutag Drilling.

== Recovery ==
The search for survivors was called off on the evening of 2 April, rescuers admitting that there was no chance of finding anyone alive, and the seismic survey vessel Vigilant returned to Peterhead on 4 April. The eight bodies found a few hours after the crash were taken to Aberdeen and then on to a police mortuary.

The Air Accidents Investigation Branch (AAIB) chartered the Vigilant for its initial investigation, which arrived on site on 3 April, carrying specialised sonar equipment to locate the wreckage on the seabed. No EPIRB beacon signal had been reported.

Grampian Police stated on the evening of 4 April that they had identified the eight bodies that were initially recovered from the surface of the sea. A second vessel, the Diving Support Vessel Bibby Topaz, was chartered to assist the work, and sailed from Peterhead on 4 April, to recover the remaining eight bodies that were not found on the surface, as well as wreckage and the cockpit voice and flight data recorders.

The wreckage of the Super Puma was located on the sea bed at a depth of 100 m (330 ft) by the Bibby Topaz. The remaining eight bodies were recovered from inside the fuselage. The combined FDR/CVR was recovered and sent to the Farnborough headquarters of the AAIB for analysis, as was all the wreckage.

== Investigations ==
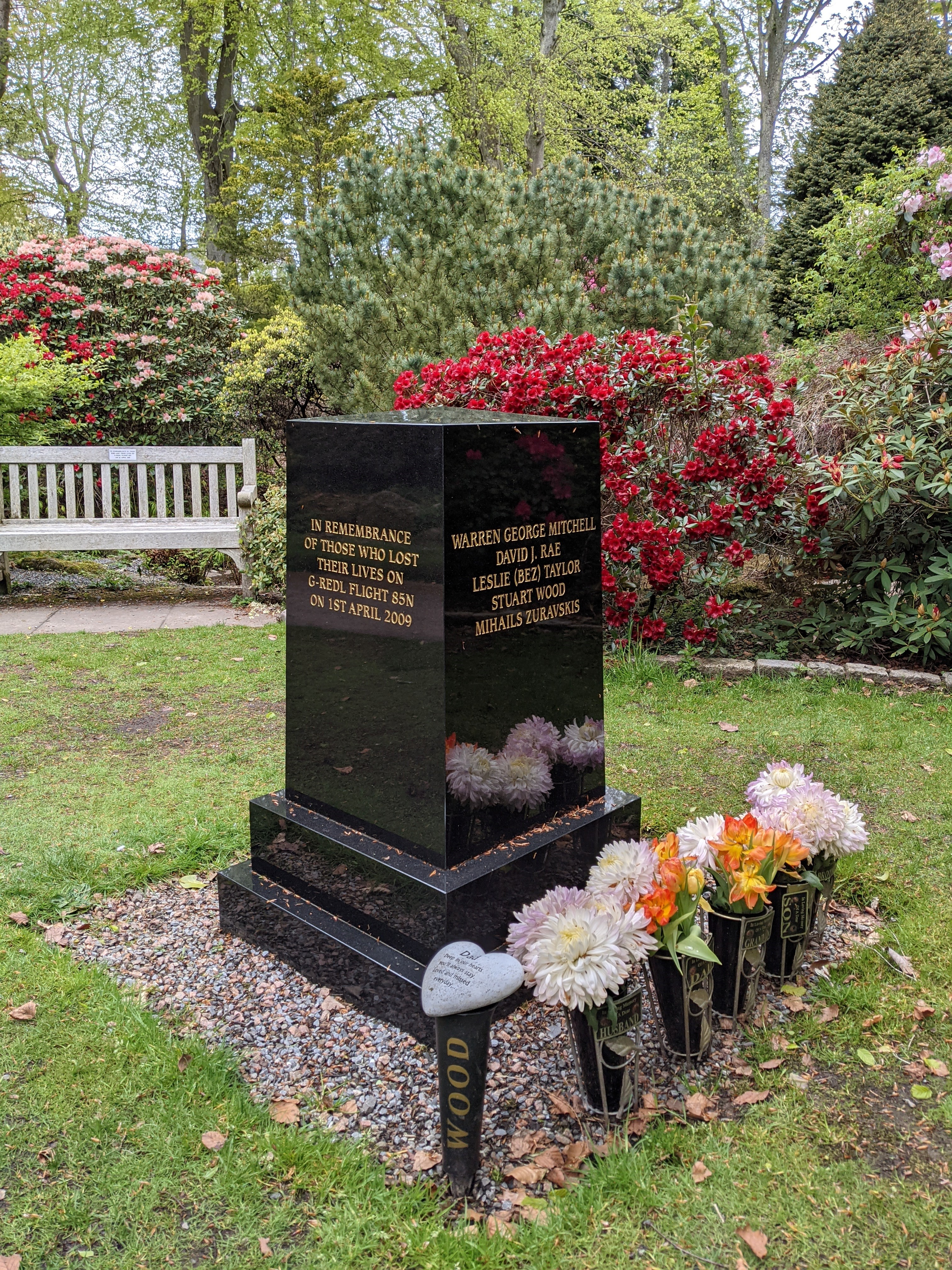
Memorial in Johnston Gardens, Aberdeen

=== AAIB investigation ===
The AAIB invited the Bureau d'Enquêtes et d'Analyses pour la sécurité de l'Aviation Civile (BEA), Eurocopter, the European Aviation Safety Agency (EASA), and the UK Civil Aviation Authority to participate. The AAIB released a third press statement on 4 April 2009 stating that work to recover the wreckage of G-REDL was continuing.

On 11 April the AAIB released its initial report into the accident in which it stated that the immediate cause of the accident was a "catastrophic failure of the main rotor gearbox" and the consequent detachment of the main rotor. Three safety recommendations were made, the first of which was that all Super Puma helicopters should receive additional checks on the main rotor gearbox epicyclic module.

On 17 April the AAIB released a second report noting that metallic debris from the gearbox had been detected 34 flying hours prior to the helicopter crash. However, "no signs of an incipient gearbox failure were detected". In response, the EASA ordered an "urgent" inspection of the gearboxes on both the AS332L2 Super Puma and the EC225LP Super Puma. Helicopter operators were given to 24 April to complete the inspections.

On 16 July the AAIB published AAIB Special Bulletin: 5/2009 detailing further progress in the investigation, including two further safety recommendations 2009–74 and 2009–75. These respectively called on the EASA to urgently review the manuals on magnetic particle detection and on planetary gear inspection.

On 24 November 2011 the AAIB published its Formal Report 20/2011 into the accident. The cause of the accident was attributed to the catastrophic failure of the Main Rotor Gearbox as a result of a fatigue fracture of a second stage planet gear in the epicyclic module.

In addition the investigation identified three contributory factors:

1. The actions taken following the discovery of a magnetic particle on the epicyclic module chip detector on 25 March 2009, 36 flying hours prior to the accident, resulted in the particle not being recognised as an indication of degradation of the second stage planet gear, which subsequently failed.
2. After 25 March 2009, the existing detection methods did not provide any further indication of the degradation of the second stage planet gear.
3. The ring of magnets installed on the AS332 L2 and EC225 main rotor gearboxes reduced the probability of detecting released debris from the epicyclic module.

Seventeen Safety Recommendations were made as a result of the investigation.

=== Fatal accident inquiry ===
On 13 March 2014, a fatal accident inquiry concluded that the accident could have been prevented if maintenance procedures had been correctly followed.

== See also ==
Bond also operated a very similar Eurocopter EC225 LP helicopter which ditched in the North Sea on 18 February 2009, in which all 18 aboard were rescued.

Other North Sea helicopter incidents:

- 1986 British International Helicopters Chinook crash
- Bristow Helicopters Flight 56C (1995)
- Helikopter Service Flight 451 (1997)
- CHC Helikopter Service Flight 241 (2016)
- Cougar Helicopters Flight 91 - similar accident involving a Sikorsky S-92 helicopter in Canada that happened the previous month
