= Flight 855 =

Flight 855 may refer to

- Air India Flight 855, crashed on 1 January 1978
- Eastern Air Lines Flight 855, lost three engines on 5 May 1983
