= East Midlands Air Support Unit =

The East Midlands Air Support Unit was a joint consortium established to provide police aviation for Leicestershire Constabulary, Northamptonshire Police and Warwickshire Police. It was formed in April 1994 and operated a Eurocopter EC135 from Sulby, near Welford in Northamptonshire.

In October 2013, it was replaced by the National Police Air Service (NPAS).

== Aircraft ==
The unit began operations in 1994 using a Eurocopter AS355 Écureuil 2, G-EMAU. This served until 1998, when it crashed shortly after takeoff from the base into the woodland opposite, killing one member of the crew and injuring two others. A year later the unit received a new aircraft, G-EMAS, a Eurocopter EC135 T1. This aircraft remained with the unit until 2007 when it was sold to the Royal Cayman Islands Police Service where it was re-registered VP-CPS. The units final aircraft before its absorption into NPAS was G-EMID, an EC135 P2+ which transferred to NPAS.

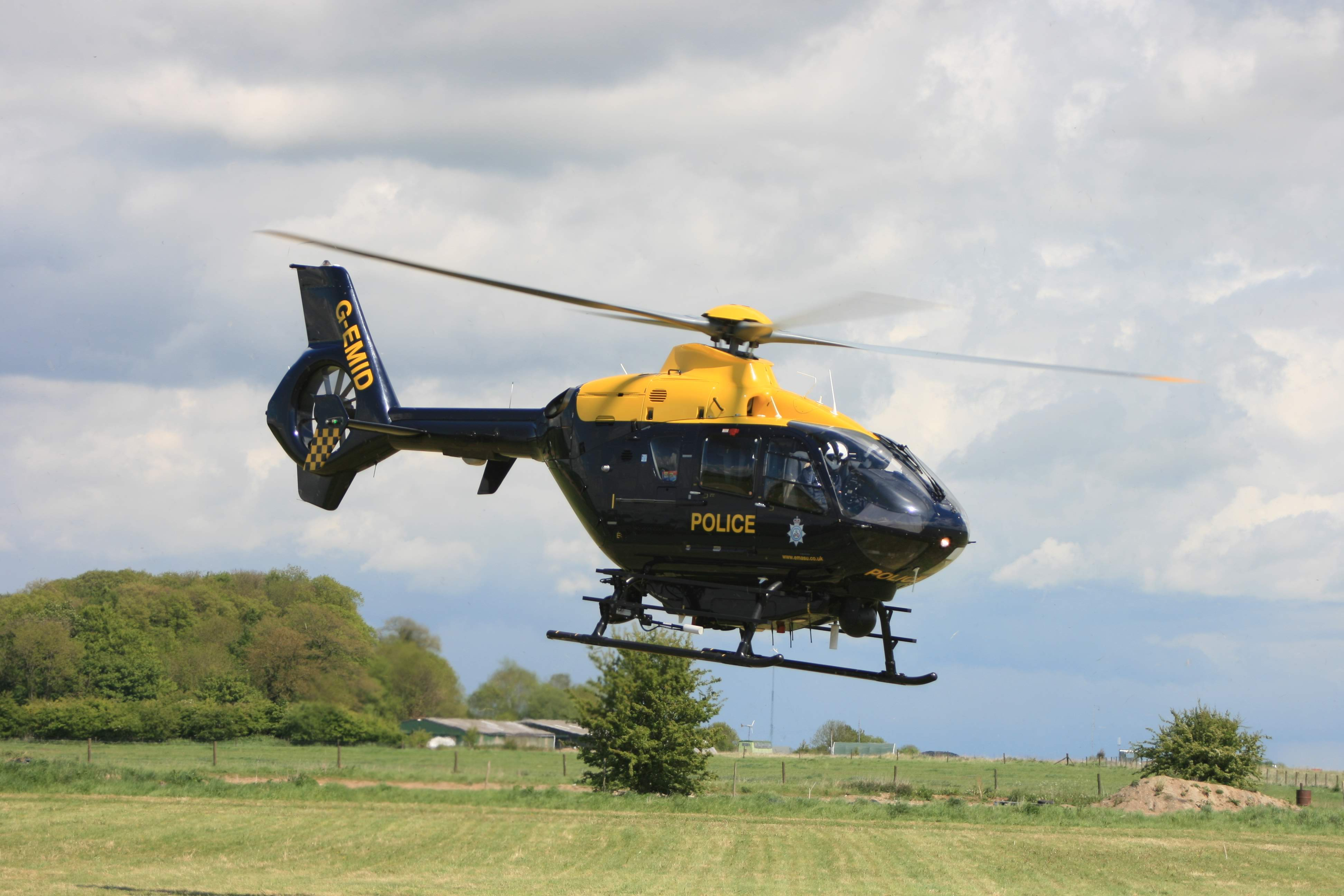
EC135 - G-EMID

== See also ==
- Police aviation
- Police aviation in the United Kingdom
