= Territorial Operations =

Group of eighteen specialist Metropolitan Police units

Territorial Operations was a group of eighteen specialist Metropolitan Police units which were set up in 1986 as part of Sir Kenneth Newman's restructuring of the Metropolitan Police Service. The Territorial Operations units were designed to support the Metropolitan Police areas and divisions. While area-based policing was designed to decentralise the operations of New Scotland Yard, the TO units were intended to provide central operational and logistic support to Areas and divisional OCUs (Operational Command Units).

== TO designations ==
The Territorial Operations groups were disbanded in 1995 due to restructuring of the Metropolitan Police. The current term 'Territorial Policing' refers to the co-operation of BCUs with pan-London units, many of them formerly TO units. The remaining pan-London units are now the remit of Met Operations. Where units have been renamed or reassigned, these are listed in italics.

- TO1 – General Department Services and HQ Support
- TO3 – Area Support
- TO4 – Public Carriage Office (now the Transport for London Public Carriage Office)
- TO5 – Central Ticket Office (now run by the Driver and Vehicle Licensing Agency or local borough authorities)
- TO6 – Central Services (now the Firearms Enquiry Team)
- TO7 – Divisional Support (now the Charities Office and Borough Licensing Officers)
- TO9 – Crime and Divisional Policing Policy Branch
- TO10 – Courts Division
- TO14 – Traffic (now CO15 – Traffic Operational Command Unit)
- TO18 – Public Order Training (now CO11 – Metropolitan Police Public Order Operational Command Unit)
- TO20 – Public Order (now CO11 – Metropolitan Police Territorial Support Group)
- TO25 – Central Communications Branch (now Command, Control, Communication and Information – C3i)
- TO26 – Air Support Unit
- TO27 – Mounted Branch
- TO28 – Police Dog Section
- TO29 – Thames Division (now Marine Policing Unit)

== See also ==
- Central Operations
- Specialist Operations
