= Air Support Unit (Metropolitan Police) =

Coordinates: 51°39′15″N 0°1′5″E

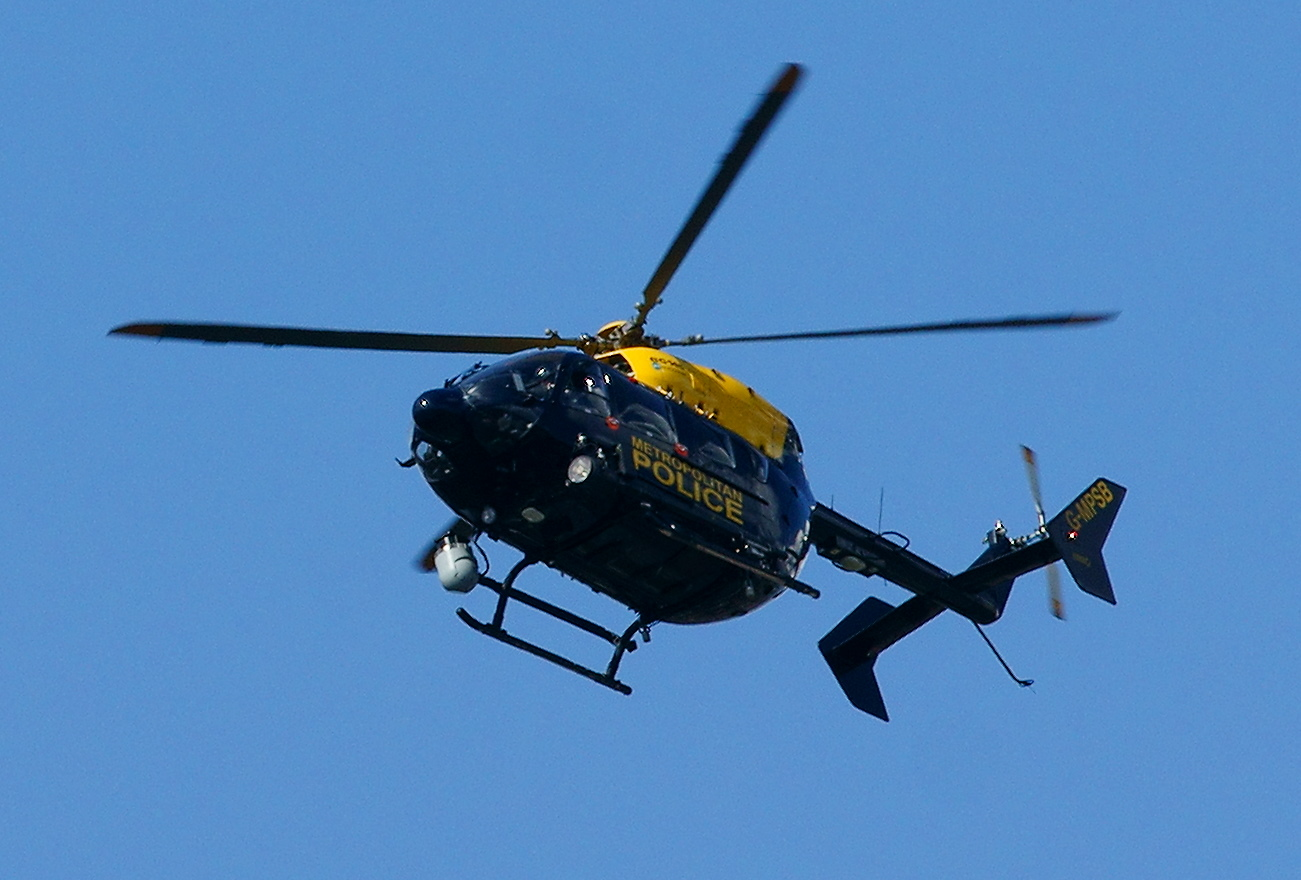
Metropolitan Police EC 145 helicopter

The Air Support Unit (ASU) was a Central Operations branch of London's Metropolitan Police Service. The main responsibility of the unit was to provide aerial reconnaissance and other air support operations. Helicopters are particularly useful in aiding searches for missing persons, car pursuits, suspect capture and large public order operations such as football matches. The ASU also supported other emergency services, including the London Fire Brigade, London Ambulance Service and Marine Coastguard. On 31 March 2015, the National Police Air Service took over providing air support to the Metropolitan Police Service (along with all other police forces in England and Wales). This resulted in the closure of the Metropolitan Police Air Support Unit.

The Metropolitan Police Service has also reportedly been secretly using Cessna aircraft for a number of years that have been fitted with surveillance equipment capable of intercepting mobile phone calls and listening in on conversations.

Formed in 1980, the unit was based at Lippitts Hill, Essex and had 48 personnel comprising 3 sergeants, 18 constables, 4 aircraft engineers, 1 avionics engineer, 11 pilots and was headed by an inspector. The unit also employed other members of staff, including operations room staff and an intelligence officer. The senior management were based at Wapping police station. All pilots were ex-military Royal Navy but also Army Air Corps. Each aircraft was crewed by a pilot with two officers acting as observers, and averaged over 260 flying hours per month.

In 1980, the ASU started with Bell 222A helicopters and in 1993 transitioned to Eurocopter AS355N Squirrel helicopters.

In July 2007, the ASU took delivery of three new Eurocopter EC145s costing a total of £15 million, using the call signs India 97, India 98 and India 99. Each aircraft has an L-3 Wescam MX-15 sensor pod which houses a gyro-stabilised colour "day" camera and a thermal imaging camera with digital video downlink from the helicopter.

In February 2015, it was announced that the control of the Metropolitan Police Air Support Unit was to be transferred to the National Police Air Service (NPAS) on 31 March, and that the base at Lippitts Hill would close in the following year. A projected new base at Elstree was intended to serve Hertfordshire, Bedfordshire, and Essex as well as London. However, by February 2017, a replacement for the Lippitts Hill base had not been procured, and the possibility of using RAF Northolt instead was being investigated.

On 7 September 2017 it was provisionally agreed by Epping Forest District Council to allow the unit to operate three helicopters and one fixed wing aircraft from North Weald Airfield in Essex, with a 25-year lease. However, in 2021 NPAS re-established a base at Lippitts Hill at the request of the Met.

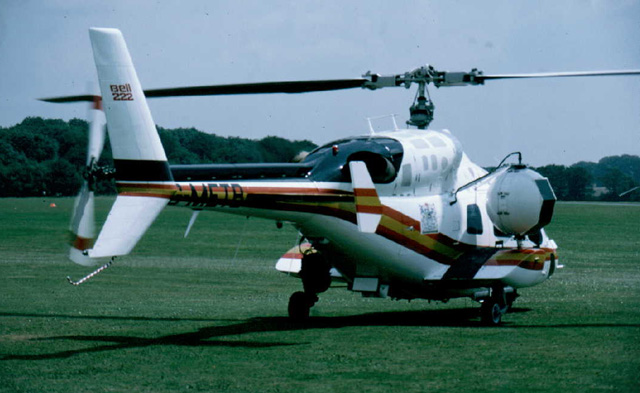
A former London Metropolitan Police Air Support Unit Bell 222 fitted with a Marconi Heli-Teli in 1982

== See also ==
- Police aviation
- Police Aviation in United Kingdom
