= Miller oilfield =

Oil reservoir under the North Sea

Miller field
- Location within North Sea
- Country: Scotland, United Kingdom
- Location: Central North Sea
- Block: 16/7b, 16/8b
- Offshore/onshore: Offshore
- Coordinates: 58.75°N 1.33°E
- Operator: BP (1982–...)
- Partners: BP; ConocoPhillips; Shell

Field history
- Discovery: 1983
- Start of production: 1992
- Peak year: 1995-6
- Abandonment: 2007

Production
- Peak of production (oil): 150,000 barrels per day (~7.5×10^{6} t/a)

The Miller oilfield is a deep reservoir under the North Sea, 240 kilometres north-east of Peterhead in UKCS Blocks 16/7b and 16/8b. It was discovered in 1983 by BP in a water depth of 100 metres. Production from Miller field started in June 1992, and plateau production was from late 1992 to 1997 at rates of up to 150,000 barrels (24,000 m^{3}) of oil and 255 million ft^{3} (7.2 million m^{3}) of gas per day at standard conditions. Miller produced some 345 million barrels (54,900,000 m^{3}) of oil during its lifetime. The field is named after Hugh Miller who contributed to Scottish geology in the early nineteenth century.

The Miller field reached the end of its economic oil and gas producing life in 2007 when Cessation of Production (CoP) approval was received from the UK government. Preparations are currently under way to decommission the Miller platform, but the oil and gas pipelines will be preserved for future opportunities.

On 1 April 2009, sixteen people were killed in the crash of a helicopter carrying workers from the Miller field back to Aberdeen.

== Geology ==
The reservoir consists of Upper Jurassic Brae Formation turbidites, 2 km deep, in the South Viking graben. The Kimmeridge Clay Formation is the source rock.

== Reservoir ==
The Miller reservoir is located at a depth of 4,090 metres (13,420 ft) below sea level, it has an estimated area of 45 square kilometres (17 sq mi) and a maximum thickness of 110 metres (360 ft). Reservoir pressure is 45,000 kilopascals (6,500 psi) and reservoir temperature is 121 °C. The oil has a gravity of 39°API and a sulphur content of 0.40%.

As of 1999, BP estimated the total recoverable reserves from the field to be 335 million barrels (53,300,000 m^{3}) of oil and 505 billion cubic feet (1.43×10^{10} m^{3}) of natural gas. Total oil in place for the reservoir is 620 million barrels (99,000,000 m^{3}).

== Development ==
The Miller platform was built by Highlands Fabricators in Nigg Bay, it was installed in July 1991. Its first year of peak production was 1993 when it produced 5.9 million tonnes per year.

=== Export pipelines ===
Gas export from Miller was via a sour gas pipeline system (Miller Gas System) comprising a 241 km, 30-inch-diameter (760 mm) sealine to St Fergus and then on via a 17.5 km 26-inch-diameter (660 mm) landline to Peterhead Power Station.

Miller oil was pumped via a 7.5 km-long, 18-inch-diameter (460 mm) export pipeline to the Brae A platform and then onwards via the Forties pipeline system to the mainland.

In 2003, BP constructed a new 8.5 km, 16-inch-diameter (410 mm) gas pipeline between the Brae B and Miller platforms to allow gas to be exported from Brae to Miller for use in the Miller Field EOR (Enhanced oil recovery) scheme.

== Decommissioning ==
Formal cessation of production for the Miller field was approved by the DECC in September 2007. In 2009, BP estimated the gross cost of decommissioning the field to be of the order of £300 million.

The initial phase of decommissioning activities involving well abandonment and topsides cleanup were completed by the end of 2009. The oil and gas export pipelines have been flushed clear of hydrocarbons and are being left in place for potential future use. The Miller platform topside and jacket will remain in place for several years while detailed plans for their removal are developed. The Jigsaw search and rescue helicopter will remain on the Miller platform during this period with minimum staffing to continue to support search and rescue operations.

== Carbon sequestration ==
BP developed plans to reuse the structure for deep carbon sequestration.
