= Babcock Mission Critical Services Onshore =

Operator of police and air ambulance helicopters in the UK

Babcock MCS Onshore
- Traded as: LSE: BAB; FTSE 250 component
- Industry: Aviation
- Predecessor: Bond Aviation Group
- Founder: Peter Bond, Stephen Bond
- Headquarters: Gloucestershire Airport, Staverton, Gloucestershire, England
- Area served: United Kingdom
- Key people: Hayley Belmore, Managing Director; David Lockwood, Group CEO
- Parent: Babcock International
- Website: www.babcockinternational.com/what-we-do/aviation/emergency-services/

Babcock Mission Critical Services Onshore, formerly Bond Air Services (Bond Aviation Group), is an operator of air ambulance, police, and offshore windfarm helicopters in the UK. Babcock operates a mixed fleet of light twin-engine helicopters custom designed to perform specific and specialised tasks. It operates from 17 bases around the UK. It has base maintenance facilities in Staverton and Glasgow.

Babcock Mission Critical Services Onshore has headquarters at Gloucestershire Airport, Staverton, Gloucestershire, which is also home to their training facilities.

Babcock MCS Onshore Operating Bases (Red). Base Maintenance Facilities (Blue)

== Services ==
=== Air Operations ===
The primary business of Babcock is the provision of an Air Operators Certificate service to end users, including turn-key packages delivering aircraft, pilots, engineers and service support in support of emergency services. This is delivered with their fleet of Airbus (formerly Eurocopter) aircraft.

=== Design and Completions ===
Babcock works in partnership with customers and aircraft manufacturers, providing bespoke design and completion services under Part21G/J approvals. This creates bespoke aircraft and accessories designed for specialised and mission-critical roles – from transporting infants to operating on live high-voltage wires.

=== Air Training Organisation ===
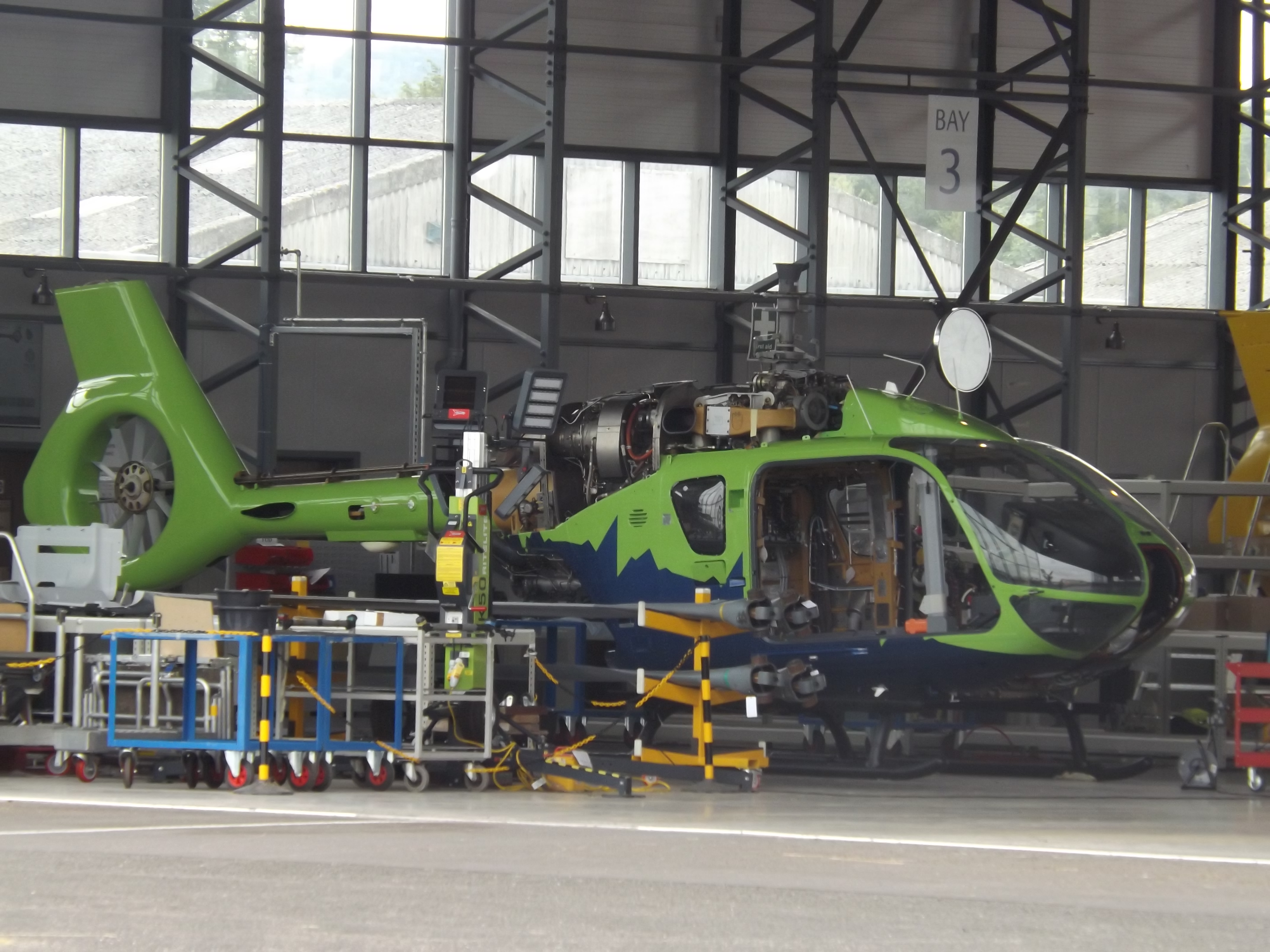
G-GWAC operated on behalf of Great Western Air Ambulance

Their training facility includes an EC135 training simulator (Level III FTD) at Staverton, providing in-house training and external training.

== History ==
In 2013 Babcock provided the first UK night helicopter emergency medical services (HEMS) utilising Night Vision Imaging Systems with East Anglian Air Ambulance.

In 2014, they were contracted by the National Police Air Service (NPAS) to upgrade seven EC135 T2 helicopters with new camera and mission systems technologies.

In 2015, Babcock took delivery of a Eurocopter EC145, ordered the previous year for use with the East Anglian Air Ambulance. They have since taken delivery of another two H145's for the Scottish Ambulance Service. Others have since entered service with East Anglian Air Ambulance and Midlands Air Ambulance. In 2018, they began operating the Airbus Helicopters H135 T3+.

In 2018, they were contracted by Western Power Distribution to upgrade five EC135 helicopters with new mission systems, infrared camera equipment, laser scanning devices and a reconfigured crew workspace.

In 2021, Babcock became the first UK HEMS provider to offer a 24/7 helicopter service to East Anglian Air Ambulance, and later in the same year offering it to Wales Air Ambulance's Cardiff based helicopter.

== Customers ==
Babcock operates a number of helicopters, including air ambulances around the UK and two police support helicopters for Police Scotland, also offering helicopter support for the renewables industry.

=== Current helicopter operations ===
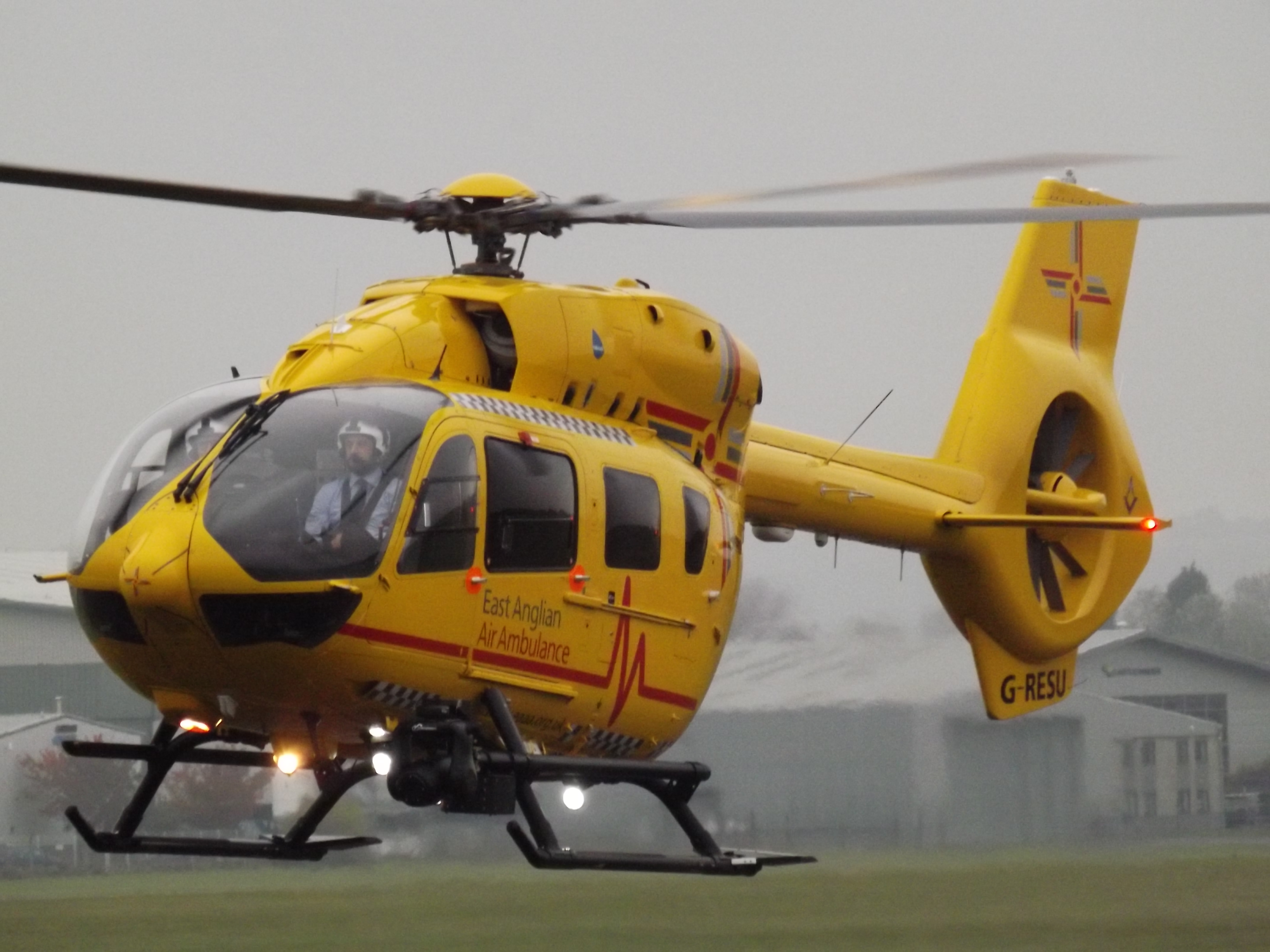
G-RESU - Operated on behalf of East Anglian Air Ambulance

Turn-key helicopter operations customers include:

- East Anglian Air Ambulance (2011–present)
- North West Air Ambulance (1999–present)
- Midlands Air Ambulance (1990–present)
- Great Western Air Ambulance (2008–present)
- Police Scotland (2013–present)
- Scottish Charity Air Ambulance (2010–present)
- Hampshire & Isle of Wight Air Ambulance (2007–present)
- Wales Air Ambulance (2001–2024)

=== Former helicopter operations ===
- Scottish Ambulance Service (1990s–2020)
- Air Ambulance Northern Ireland (2015–2022)
- Thames Valley Air Ambulance (2011–2022)
- Ørsted Walney Wind Farm Extension (2018–2021)
- PSE Kinsale Oil Platform Support (2015–2020)
- SSE Greater Gabbard Wind Farm Support (2013–?)

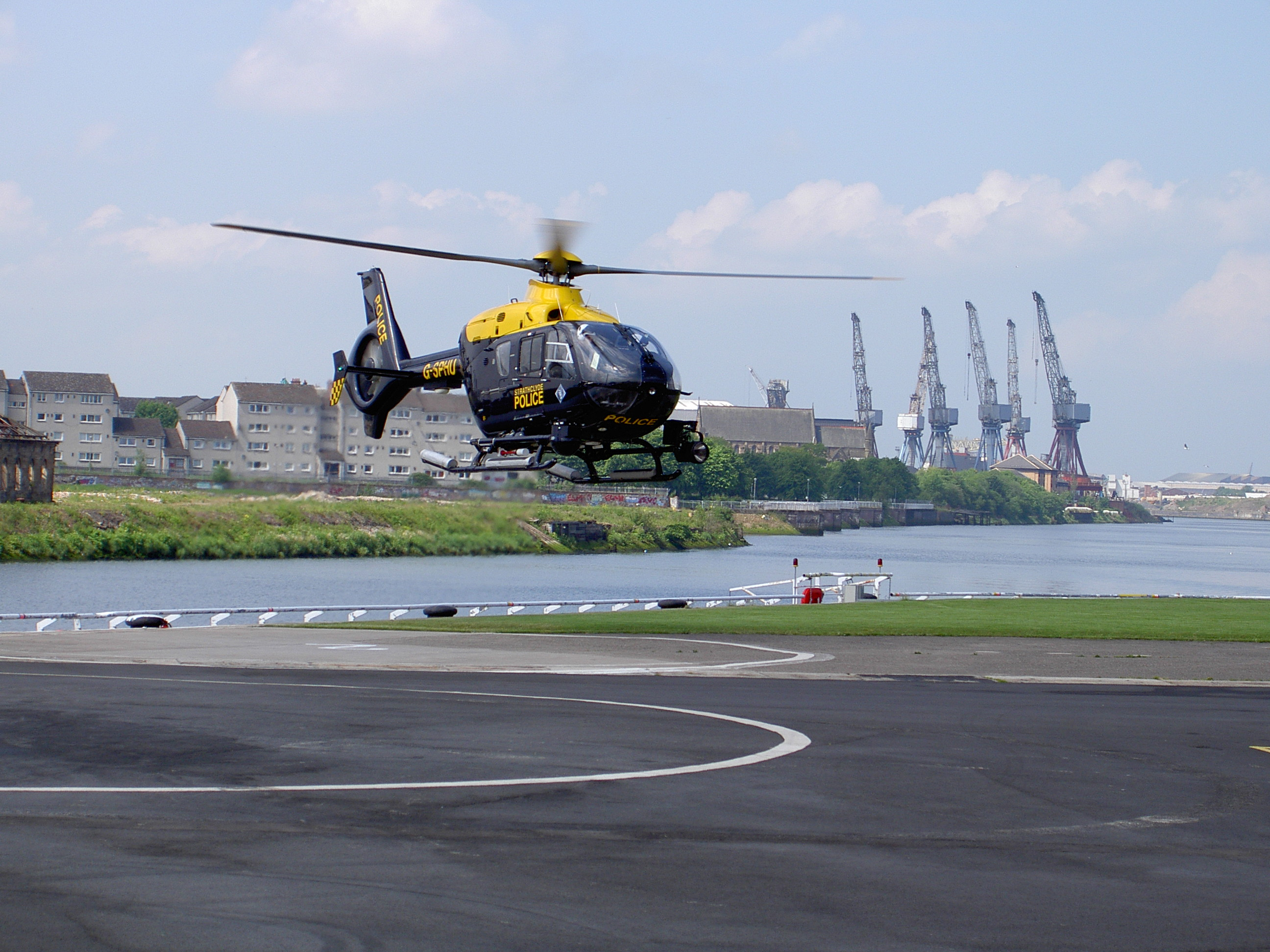
G-SPHU operated on behalf of Police Scotland

== Prince William ==
In 2014, it was announced that Prince William, Duke of Cambridge would take on a full-time role as a pilot with Bond Air Services based at Cambridge Airport.

== Incidents ==
- On 29 November 2013, G-SPAO, an EC135-T2+ operated by Bond Air Services on behalf of Police Scotland, crashed through the roof of the Clutha Vaults pub in Glasgow, killing all three people on board and seven in the building, and injuring 31 people.
- On 4 May 2020, G-SASS, an EC145-D2 operated by Babcock on behalf of Scottish Ambulance Service partially lifted the roof of a nearby caravan with its downwash on departure from the Isle of Arran.

== See also ==
- Babcock Mission Critical Services Offshore
- Babcock Scandinavian Air Ambulance
- Babcock Mission Critical Services Australasia
- Babcock International
- Bond Aviation Group
