= Eastern Air Lines Flight 855 =

1983 aviation incident

Eastern Airlines Flight 855
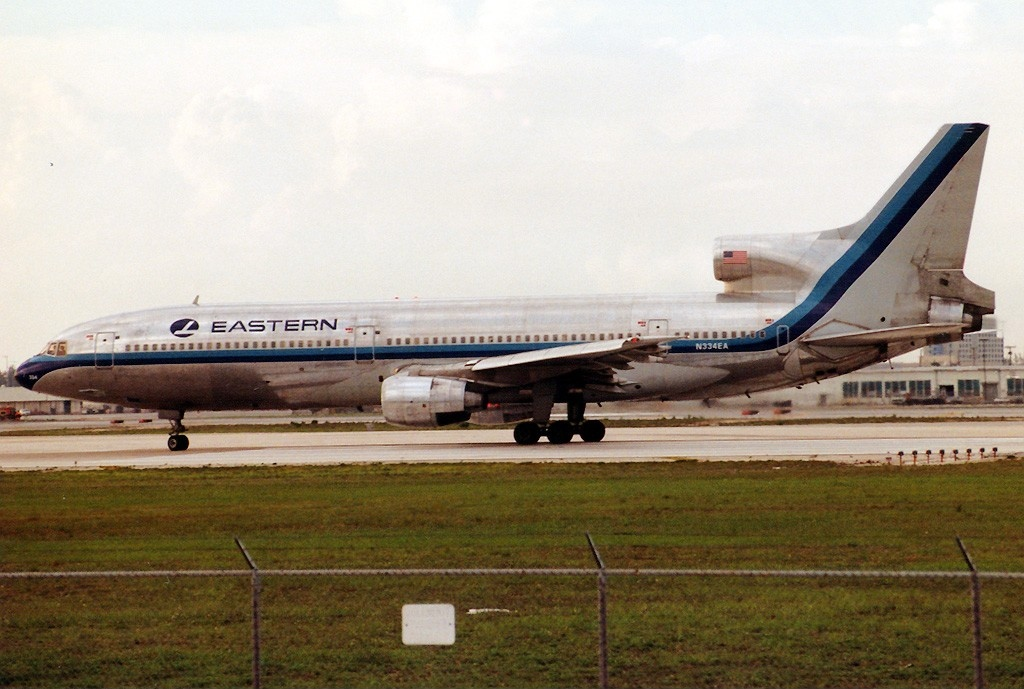
- N334EA, the aircraft involved in the incident, pictured in 1990 with a newer livery

Incident
- Date: May 5, 1983
- Summary: Multiple engine failures due to maintenance error

Aircraft
- Aircraft type: Lockheed L-1011 TriStar 1
- Operator: Eastern Air Lines
- IATA flight No.: EA855
- ICAO flight No.: EAL855
- Call sign: EASTERN 855
- Registration: N334EA
- Flight origin: Miami International Airport
- Destination: Nassau International Airport
- Occupants: 172
- Passengers: 162
- Crew: 10
- Fatalities: 0
- Survivors: 172

On May 5, 1983, a Lockheed L-1011 TriStar, registration N334EA, operating as Eastern Air Lines Flight 855 en route from Miami International Airport to Nassau International Airport, experienced the loss of all three engines near Miami, Florida. The flight crew succeeded in restarting one engine in time to safely land the aircraft at Miami International Airport.

== Aircraft ==
The incident aircraft was a Lockheed L-1011 TriStar 1, registration N334EA, msn 1141. The aircraft had been manufactured in 1976. It was powered by three Rolls-Royce RB211-22B turbofan engines.

== Background ==
On May 4, N334EA had flown into Miami where it underwent overnight maintenance, which included a check of the magnetic chip detectors inside the jet engines. This involved removing the master chip detector from each engine and replacing it with a new one. Each chip detector had two O-rings, which served as oil seals. The replacement chip detectors were not fitted with O-rings, a fact which was not noticed by the mechanic who fitted them. After the chip detectors were fitted, each engine was run for 10 seconds to check for oil leaks. None were found. The aircraft was signed off as serviceable and returned to service.

== Incident ==
Eastern Air Lines Flight 855 took off from Miami International Airport at 08:56 on a flight to Nassau International Airport in the Bahamas carrying 162 passengers and 10 crew. On board was a veteran flight crew, consisting of Captain Richard Boddy (58), Captain Steve Thompson (48) and Flight Engineer Dudley Barnes (44). Captain Boddy had more than 12,000 hours of total flying experience, although he was new to the L-1011, having logged just 13 hours in the aircraft type. On this flight, Captain Thompson served as a supervisory check airman. He had accrued close to 17,000 flight hours throughout his career, with 282 hours in the L-1011. Flight Engineer Barnes had more than 9,000 hours of total flying time, with 2,666 hours clocked in the L-1011 cockpit.

At 09:15, while descending through 15,000 feet (4,600 m), the low oil pressure indicator on the TriStar's number 2 engine illuminated. The flight engineer noted that the oil pressure on the #2 engine was fluctuating between 15 and 25 psi; the minimum pressure required for normal engine operation was 30 psi. The captain ordered the flight engineer to shut down the engine.

By this time, the plane was about 50 miles (80 km) from Nassau. The crew elected to return to Miami to land. Flight 855 received a clearance back to Miami, as well as instructions to begin a climb to FL200 (20,000 ft (6,100 m) nominal altitude).

En route back to Miami, low oil pressure lights for engines #1 and #3 illuminated, and the oil quantity gauges for all three engines read zero. At 09:23, Flight 855 informed Miami ARTCC of the engine gauge readings but stated, "We believe it to be faulty indications since the chance of all three engines having zero oil pressure and zero quantity is almost nil." At 09:28, at an altitude of 16,000 feet (4,900 m), the #3 engine failed. Five minutes later, the #1 engine flamed out while the crew was attempting to restart the #2 engine. Cabin lights went off and flight deck instruments stopped working. The aircraft descended without power from about 13,000 feet (4,000 m) to about 4,000 feet (1,200 m), at a rate of descent of approximately 1,600 feet (490 m) per minute. The crew successfully restarted the #2 engine on the third attempt and executed a one-engine landing at Miami at 09:46. After the landing the power from #2 engine was insufficient for the aircraft to taxi; a tug had to be used to tow it to the airport terminal, where the occupants disembarked normally. None of the 172 passengers and crew aboard were injured in the incident.

== Cause ==
The National Transportation Safety Board determined that the probable cause of the incident was as follows:

[T]he omission of all the O-ring seals on the magnetic chip detector assemblies leading to the loss of lubrication and damage to the airplane's three engines as a result of the failure of mechanics to follow the established and proper procedures for the installation of magnetic chip detectors in the engine lubrication system, the repeated failure of supervisory personnel to require mechanics to comply strictly with the prescribed installation procedures, and the failure of Eastern Air Lines management to assess adequately the significance of similar previous occurrences and to act effectively to institute corrective action. Contributing to the cause of the incident was the failure of Federal Aviation Administration maintenance inspectors to assess the significance of the incidents involving magnetic chip detectors and to take effective surveillance and enforcement measures to prevent the recurrence of the incidents.

— NTSB Aircraft Accident Report AAR-84-04: Eastern Airlines, INC., Lockheed L-1011, N334EA

It was subsequently established that the engines needed to be run for at least 30 seconds with no O-rings fitted before an oil leak would become apparent.

== Awards ==
Barnes, Boddy and Thompson were each presented with an Award for Outstanding Airmanship by the Airline Pilots Association.

== Aftermath ==
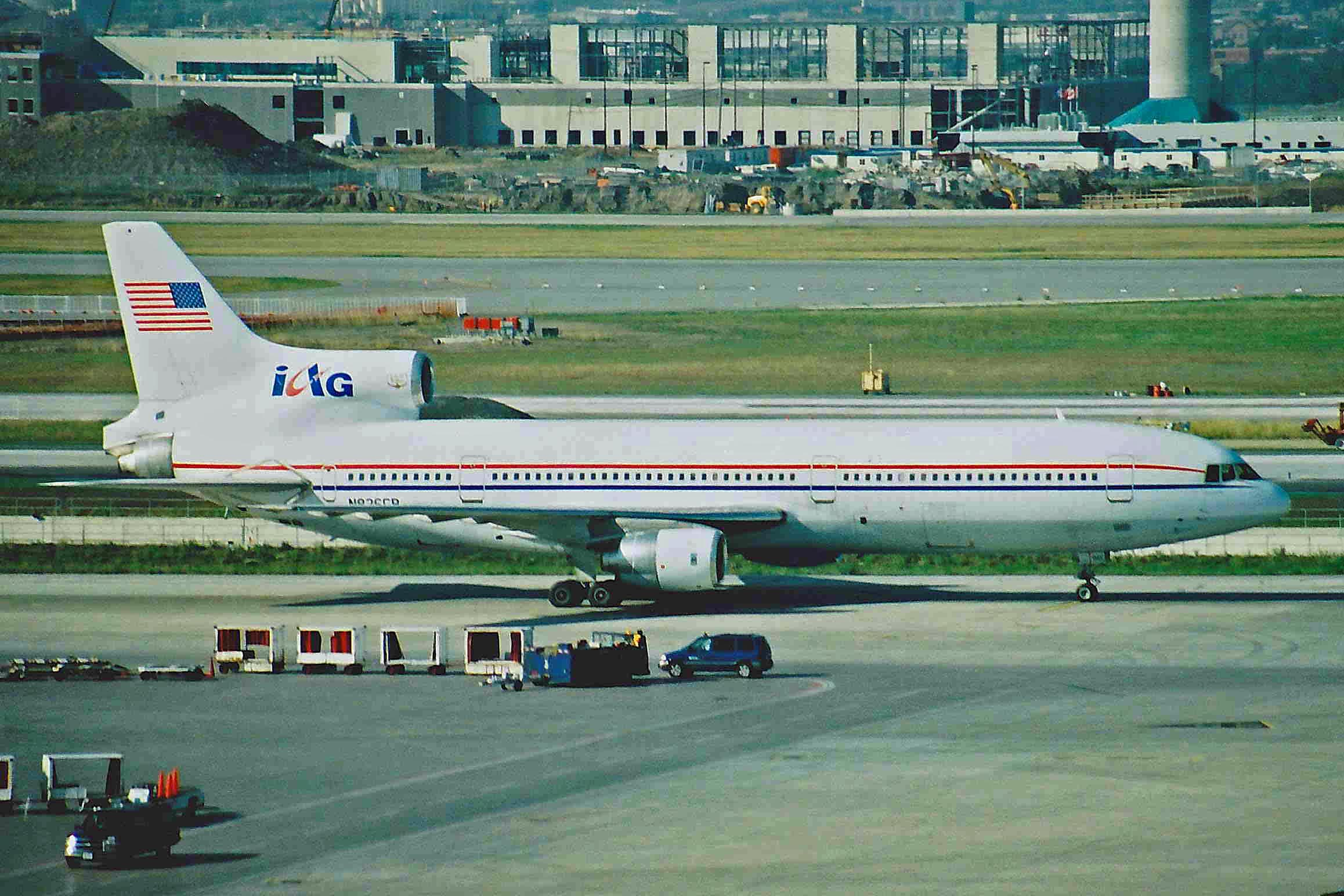
The aircraft involved, under the registration of N826CR, while operating for Tradewinds Airlines, seen in August 2000

The aircraft, N334EA, was later repaired and returned to service. The aircraft would later fly for Air Algerie in 1989, before being leased to American Trans Air that same year. Following Eastern Airlines ceasing operations in 1991, the aircraft would be transferred to Delta Air Lines, and re-registered as N788DL. The aircraft would later be transferred to Tradewinds Airlines in 1997, being registered as N826CR. The aircraft was later scrapped at Greensboro in March 2004.

== Lawsuit ==
After the incident, 25 passengers sued Eastern Airlines for damages resulting from mental harm and distress caused. This was because - after the shutdown of all engines but before successfully restarting the #2 engine - the flight crew informed the cabin that the aircraft would have to be ditched in the Atlantic Ocean.

Under the Warsaw Convention, this incident was applicable because it involved what Eastern Airlines conceded amounted to an "accident". However, no bodily injury, wounding, or death were sustained by any passenger. The Warsaw Convention was written originally in French, and so the French-language text would need to be interpreted in its native language. The English-language translation used by the U.S. Senate stated that an airline is responsible "in the event of the death or wounding of a passenger or any other bodily injury" of a passenger, which would not leave room for interpretation that includes psychological distress. However, the original French used "en cas de mort, de blessure ou de toute autre lesion corporelle". The case therefore hung specifically on whether the passengers had suffered "lesion corporelle".

The U.S. District Court concluded that mental anguish alone is not compensatable on the grounds that, according to a French-language dictionary, the words "lesion" referred to injury and "corporelle" specifically referred to bodily injury. On appeal, the Circuit Court reversed, finding that "lesion corporelle" included mental anguish. The reasoning was that, given that "blessure" was already in the same sentence and has an understood meaning of a "visual rupture on the body", it was taken to be the case that "lesion corporelle" might involve a wider array of injury, such as oxygen deprivation, physical impact, or smoke inhalation. The legal theory being used was that the text should be interpreted to not include surplusage, i.e., the same meaning being conveyed twice over. Further, the official German translation of the text which is applicable in German, Austrian and Swiss law uses a term that translates to "infringement on the health".

Eastern Airlines appealed successfully to the U.S. Supreme Court, which heard the case as Eastern Airlines, Inc. v. Floyd, 499 U.S. 530 (1991). The court found that the term "lesion corporelle" had never been used in French legislation prior to 1929, and further no court cases expanded on the word's use. More recent cases used the term to describe actual bodily harm, but the court concluded that since these cases were far more recent, they did not reflect the thinking of the authors of the Warsaw Convention in 1929. They found that the evidence for interpreting the treaty broadly to encompass psychic harm was scant and that there was no legal precedent of the Warsaw Convention being applied this way. They also found that there was virtually no evidence that the law was meant to be applied to include psychic injury at the time. The court found in favour of Eastern Airlines and determined that the mental distress did not fall under Article 17 of the Warsaw Convention and therefore Eastern Airlines was not liable.
