= 2013 Glasgow helicopter crash =

2013 fatal helicopter accident in Scotland

Glasgow helicopter crash
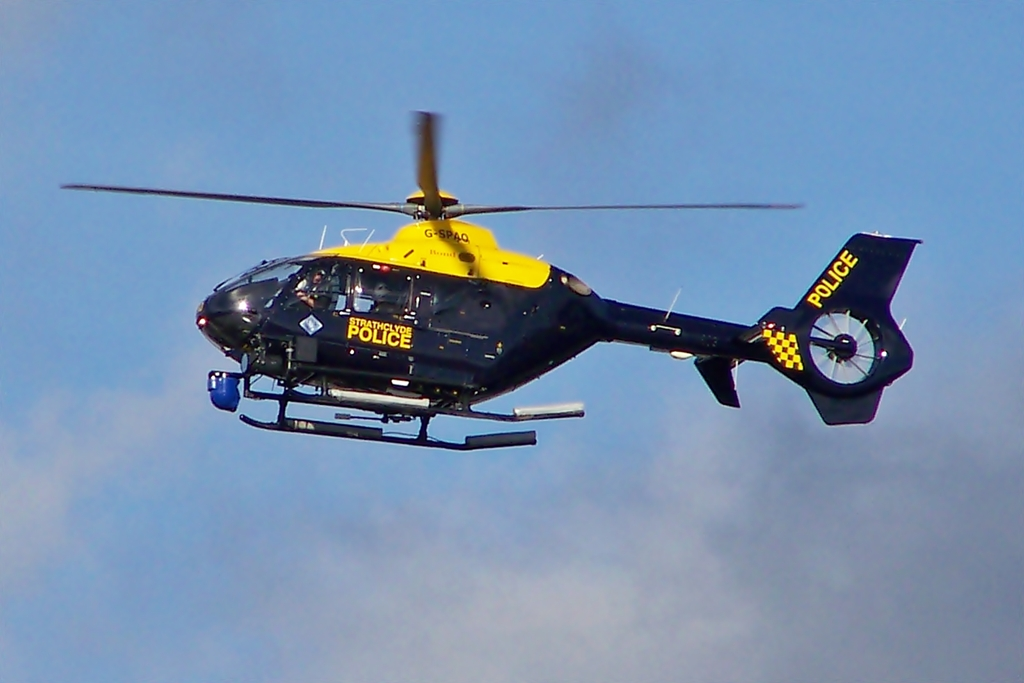
- G-SPAO, the EC135 helicopter involved in the crash, photographed in 2010

Accident
- Date: 29 November 2013
- Summary: Fuel starvation due to pilot error
- Site: The Clutha Vaults, 169 Stockwell Street, Glasgow, Scotland; 55°51′16″N 4°15′0″W
- Total fatalities: 10
- Total injuries: 31

Aircraft
- Aircraft type: Eurocopter EC135-T2+
- Operator: Bond Air Services for Police Scotland
- Registration: G-SPAO
- Flight origin: Glasgow City Heliport
- Occupants: 3
- Crew: 3
- Fatalities: 3
- Survivors: 0

Ground casualties
- Ground fatalities: 7
- Ground injuries: 31

On 29 November 2013, a police helicopter operated by Bond Air Services for Police Scotland crashed into The Clutha, a pub in central Glasgow, killing all three crew on board and seven patrons of the pub. Thirty-one more people in the pub were injured.

The subsequent investigation concluded that the cause of the crash was fuel starvation due to incorrect operation of the fuel system.

== Accident ==
The helicopter took off from its base at Glasgow City Heliport (which at the time operated from Stobcross Quay adjacent to the SECC) at 20:45 on 29 November 2013. The pilot was 51-year-old David Traill; Traill had flown Chinook helicopters in the RAF for 20 years, latterly as an instructor. He had worked for the police for four years, and had 646 hours of flight experience on the EC135. The helicopter carried two police observers, PCs Kirsty Nelis and Tony Collins. On takeoff it carried 400 kilograms (880 lb) of fuel.

The flight, callsign SP99, was initially involved in the search for a suspected trespasser on railway lines around Eglinton Toll. It was then tasked to Dalkeith in Midlothian, around 44 miles (71 kilometres) east of its base, before returning to the Glasgow area. A few minutes before the crash, the pilot had received air traffic control clearance to return to Glasgow City Heliport.

At 22:22, approximately two miles (three kilometres) east of its home base, the helicopter crashed on the flat roof of The Clutha, a pub in Stockwell Street (Clutha is Latin for the River Clyde, which is adjacent to the pub). No distress call was made. A ska band, Esperanza, was playing in the pub at the time of the crash and there were reported to be around 120 people in the building, some of whom were trapped by the collapsing roof. The three helicopter occupants and six people on the ground were killed. Thirty-two others were injured, twelve seriously, one of whom died some days later. One witness, Gordon Smart, editor of the Scottish Sun, stated that he did not see a fireball or hear an explosion, and that the engine seemed to be misfiring.

== Aircraft ==
The accident aircraft was a twin-engined Eurocopter EC135 T2+, serial 0546, registered G-SPAO and manufactured in 2007. At the time of the accident, it had flown for 6,351 hours and made 9,385 landings. The helicopter's Certificate of Airworthiness was valid until 4 September 2018.

== Emergency response ==
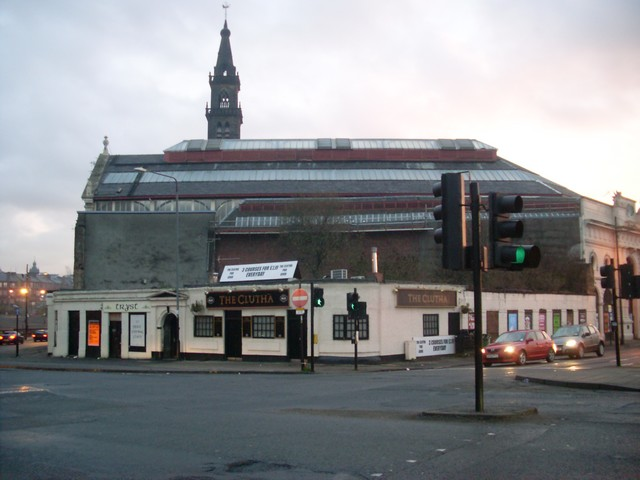
2008 view of the accident site; The Clutha pub is the cream building in the foreground

The building is a former tenement which used to have multiple storeys, but after a fire in the 1960s the upper storeys were removed. The walls were therefore much thicker than would be expected for a building of this height, and the complex construction of the roof complicated the search and rescue operation. The Scottish Fire and Rescue Service deployed 125 firefighters to the scene rescuing people trapped in the building for hours after the incident. The Scottish Ambulance Service sent upwards of 25 ambulances to the scene along with 2 Special Operations Response Teams that specialise in major and inaccessible incidents. They worked throughout the next two days searching and retrieving people from within the Clutha. Urban search and rescue firefighters were also in attendance to shore up unstable parts of the building and to excavate collapsed areas. People rescued from the scene were initially taken by the emergency services to a nearby Holiday Inn hotel. Labour Party MP Jim Murphy was interviewed as he was passing soon after the crash.

32 people were taken for treatment to local hospitals including Glasgow Royal Infirmary and Glasgow Victoria Infirmary, a dozen with injuries classed as serious. An emergency phone number was set up for anyone concerned about family and relatives who may have been in and around the pub, and Glasgow City Council established a family reception centre to "provide advice and counselling to relatives of people who have been injured or people whose relatives are unaccounted for". One of the seriously injured victims died from his injuries on 12 December.

== Reactions ==
Then-First Minister Alex Salmond described the crash as "a black day for Glasgow and for Scotland". On the day following the crash, planned St. Andrew's Day celebrations in Glasgow's George Square were cancelled, and flags were flown at half-mast on Scottish Government buildings. Scottish football clubs held a pre-match minute's silence. Special services were held at Glasgow's St Andrew's Cathedral and Glasgow Cathedral.

The Prince of Wales visited the crash site on 6 December and met emergency service personnel. Police investigated offensive, racist or sectarian comments made about the crash on social media. A weekend of fundraising events for the families of the victims and the emergency services was held on 3–5 January 2014.

== Investigation ==
The Air Accidents Investigation Branch (AAIB), which is responsible for investigating aircraft crashes in the United Kingdom, launched an investigation into the cause of the accident. Assistance in the investigation was provided by the German Federal Bureau of Aircraft Accident Investigation and the French Bureau d'Enquêtes et d'Analyses pour la Sécurité de l'Aviation Civile aviation incident investigation bodies (the manufacturers of the helicopter and its engine are based in Germany and France). The American National Transportation Safety Board (representing the state of the manufacturer of the engines' FADEC controls), also provided assistance.

The wreckage of the helicopter arrived at the AAIB's headquarters at Farnborough, Hampshire on 3 December. The aircraft was not fitted with flight data recorders but the electronics fitted to the aircraft could contain data helpful in determining the cause of the accident.

=== Preliminary findings ===
The AAIB issued a preliminary report of its findings on 9 December. It confirmed that the rotor blades were attached, but neither they nor the fenestron tail rotor were rotating at the time of impact. No evidence of engine or gearbox failure was found and there were around 95 litres (21 imp gal) of fuel still on board.

The aircraft struck the building with "a high rate of descent and low/negligible forward speed" and no part of it detached in flight. It came to rest approximately upright.

On 14 February 2014, the AAIB issued a Special Bulletin on the accident. It stated that the cause of the accident was that both engines had flamed out, but the reasons that they had done so had not yet been determined. The report stated that of the two supply tanks that provided fuel to the engines, one was empty and the other near empty, containing only 0.4 kg (14 oz) of fuel. The main tank contained 75 kg (165 lb) of fuel, but the pumps to transfer this fuel to the two engine supply tanks were switched off.

=== Final report ===
The final accident report was published in October 2015. It found the main cause of the accident to be fuel starvation due to the fuel transfer pumps being switched off "for unknown reasons." This resulted in the engines flaming out despite there being 73 kg (161 lb) of usable fuel remaining in the main tank. A failure to land within ten minutes of the first low-fuel warning, as prescribed by emergency checklists, and a failure to achieve a successful autorotation after both engines failed were cited as additional causal factors.

The AAIB also identified as contributory factor that the radar altimeter and the steerable landing light were both unpowered following the engine flame-out, leading to a loss of height information and reduced visual cues during the autorotation manoeuvre. Seven safety recommendations were made.

=== Fatal accident inquiry ===
In 2017 the Crown Office announced that a fatal accident inquiry would be held into the crash. The Crown Office also confirmed that no criminal charges would be laid following an investigation by Police Scotland. Preliminary hearings were held on 3 October and 4 December 2018, then on 11 January 5 February and 3 April 2019. The inquiry began on 8 April 2019 in a temporary court at Hampden Park football ground, and concluded on 5 August. The inquiry was mandatory in respect of the crew of the helicopter, and discretionary in respect of the customers of the Clutha Vaults. The inquiry sat for 31 days between 8 April and 18 July. Sheriff Principal Craig Turnbull provided a written determination which was published on 30 October 2019. No recommendations were made.

== Aftermath ==
=== The Clutha ===
The Clutha pub partially reopened in July 2015, with Scotland's First Minister Nicola Sturgeon attending the opening ceremony.

=== Civil aviation ===
As a direct result of the accident and recommendations made by the AAIB, the Civil Aviation Authority mandated that all police helicopters would be fitted with Cockpit Voice Recorders and Flight Data Recorders. Implementation of this was to be completed by 31 March 2020.

=== Media ===
One of the survivors from the bar, Michael Byrne, was interviewed by Jane Garvey for "We Said We’d Never Talk About It Again", a November 2021 episode of her BBC Radio 4 series Life Changing. He described how the experience had led him to contemplate suicide, and to setting up "Lived Experience Trauma Support", an organisation providing mental health training and support services.
