= National Police Service =

Planned national law enforcement agency in the UK

- Abbreviation: NPS

Jurisdictional structure
- Operations jurisdiction: England and Wales
- Jurisdiction of the National Police Service

Operational structure
- Parent agency: Home Office

The National Police Service (NPS) is a planned law enforcement agency in the United Kingdom.

The proposed force would take over the remit for:

- Counter terrorism policing from the Metropolitan Police
- National Roads Policing run by Sussex Police
- The National Police Air Service run by West Yorkshire Police
- Serious and organised crime investigations from the National Crime Agency
- Financial crimes from the City of London Police
- Professional development and training from the College of Policing.

The NPS would mainly cover England and Wales, working closely with the Police Service of Northern Ireland and Police Scotland but respecting the devolved areas of policing, It would be able to set UK-wide standards and training.

Establishment of the National Police Service forms part of wider reforms of policing, including reducing the police forces in England and Wales from 43. The reforms were set out in the white paper From Local to National: a New Model for Policing on 26 January 2026. The establishment date for the National Police Service has not yet been announced.

== See also ==
- List of police forces of the United Kingdom
