= Glasgow City Heliport =

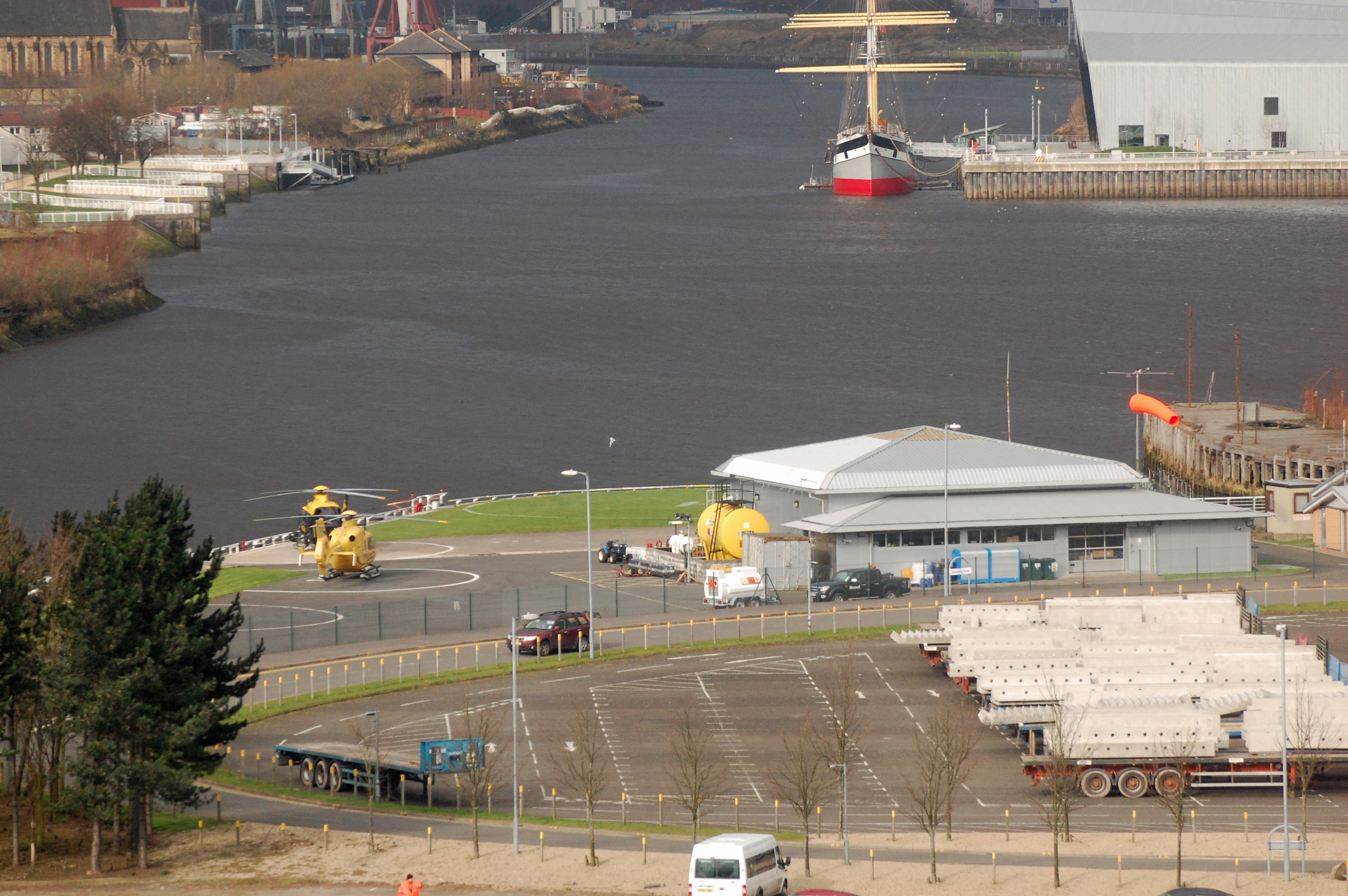
- The Heliport at SECC prior to moving to Linthouse Road in 2014.
- IATA: none; ICAO: EGEG

Summary
- Airport type: Private
- Owner: Babcock Mission Critical Services Onshore Ltd
- Serves: Glasgow
- Location: Glasgow, Scotland, UK
- Coordinates: 55°52′03.7″N 04°19′59.4″W

Map
- Location in Glasgow

Helipads
Number	Length		Surface
Number	ft	m	Surface
6			Concrete

Glasgow City Heliport (ICAO: EGEG) is a heliport located in Glasgow, Scotland. The Heliport is located at Linthouse Road in Govan, close to the Queen Elizabeth University Hospital.

The heliport is owned and operated by Babcock Mission Critical Services Onshore Ltd. and is the operating base for the Police Service of Scotland air support unit. This unit is operated by Babcock MCSO under contract. The heliport can also handle an amount of passenger traffic. The ground facilities consist of a maintenance hangar building and parking for 6 small to medium-sized helicopters.

Aircraft permanently operating from Glasgow City Heliport are:

- Police 51 – Police Scotland Air Support Unit – (Eurocopter EC-135). The callsign Sierra-Papa-99 has been retired following the 2013 Glasgow helicopter crash.

Historically a Scottish Ambulance Service aircraft (Airbus H145) was based on site, until the contract was in-housed away from Babcock by Gama Aviation and moved to Glasgow Airport. Glasgow City Heliport still provides support to HEMS acting as a refuel site and forward operating base for Scotlands Charity Air Ambulance (Eurocopter EC135) based at Perth Airport.

== Previous location ==
Prior to May 2014 the heliport was located approximately 1.5 mi (2.4 km) East from its present location, within the grounds of the Scottish Exhibition and Conference Centre and directly across the River Clyde from the Glasgow Science Centre and BBC Scotland's Pacific Quay Studios. Planned future development of the SECC area enforced the move.
