= Offshore Helicopter Services =

British helicopter operator

IATA	ICAO	Call sign
–	ULR	VIPER
- Founded: 2001
- Operating bases: Aberdeen Airport; Sumburgh Airport
- Fleet size: 15
- Headquarters: Aberdeen

Offshore Helicopter Services (OHS), previously known as Babcock MCS Offshore and Bond Offshore Helicopters, is a British helicopter operator, specialising in providing offshore helicopter transportation services to North Sea offshore platforms.

OHS operates a mixed fleet of helicopters on behalf of a small number of energy industry customers. Annually they transport around 200,000 passengers to and from offshore oil and gas platforms from bases at Aberdeen and Sumburgh airports. OHS also operates two specialist Search and Rescue (SAR) aircraft to support the Oil and Gas industry. These two AW139 helicopters are based at Aberdeen airport and equipped with specialist search and rescue equipment and provide 24-hour SAR coverage for the central North Sea.

Bond Offshore Helicopters became a Babcock International Group company when Babcock acquired the Avincis group in May 2014. In September 2021, Babcock sold its oil and gas aviation business to CHC Group. CHC were instructed to divest OHS following a UK Competitions and Markets Authority investigation into the purchase & proposed merger of the two UK companies. The company was subsequently sold to the owner of South African aviation company Ultimate Aviation.

== History ==
David Bond (1920–1977), founder of the Bond company, was a wartime Lancaster pilot (90 Squadron) who set up his own company in 1946 and flew Austers, Lancastrians and Halifaxes for air taxis and charter work. He switched to helicopters in 1953 and was involved in crop-spraying in Jamaica and Honduras, surveying in Algeria, and flying for Marley Tiles before launching the company which was to become Bond Aviation.

=== 1960s–1970s ===
David Bond founded Management Aviation, in 1961 to operate Hiller 12E helicopters near Cambridge for commercial services (mostly crop spraying) in the UK. By 1972 the company had entered the North Sea market, and introduced the world's first light twin-engined helicopter, Bolkow 105, in support of North Sea and Lighthouse Operations. These were supplemented by Aérospatiale SA 365 Dauphin 2 flying from Bacton and Theddlethorpe. Additional operational bases at Kirmington and ex-RAF Strubby began in 1975.

In 1977, Steven Bond, son of David, became managing director for the Bond company when David died and by 1979 the Bond company expanded their North Sea market with medium and heavy category S-58T and S-61N helicopters.

=== 1980s–2000 ===
Management Aviation provided services to Eon Productions for the films For Your Eyes Only and Octopussy, leading to scenes where actor Walter Gotell as KGB General Gogol was being flown by pilot (Geoff) Bond.

Management Aviation were rebranded as Bond Helicopters in 1984.

In 1987, Bond launched the UK's first dedicated air ambulance for Cornwall Air Ambulance Service and by 1991 Bond Helicopters was one of the largest helicopter companies in the UK. Bond Air Services then formed as a division of Bond Helicopters in the same year to manage expansion of light twin market for clients (such as air ambulance services and light houses) and by 1993 Bond had expanded internationally, acquiring Lloyd Helicopters, Australia and South East Asia's largest helicopter operator, which created an overall fleet of 107 helicopters.

By 1994, Bond Group had merged with Norway's Helikopter Service to form the Helicopter Services Group, the world's largest commercial helicopter offshore operating group, with a fleet of over 350 twin engine helicopters.

In 1999, CHC Helicopter purchased the Helicopter Services Group, Stephen and Peter Bond (sons of founder David Bond) then acquired Bond Air Services division, (non oil & gas operations), from Helicopter Services Group.

=== 2001–present ===
In 2001, Bond HQ moved from Aberdeen, Scotland to custom-built facilities at Gloucestershire Airport, however, its main operational base remained in Aberdeen.

In 2004, Bond Aviation Group re-entered the offshore oil & gas support market, forming 'Bond Offshore Helicopters', and established an operating base, including Hangarage and passenger terminal facilities, on the east side of Aberdeen airport.

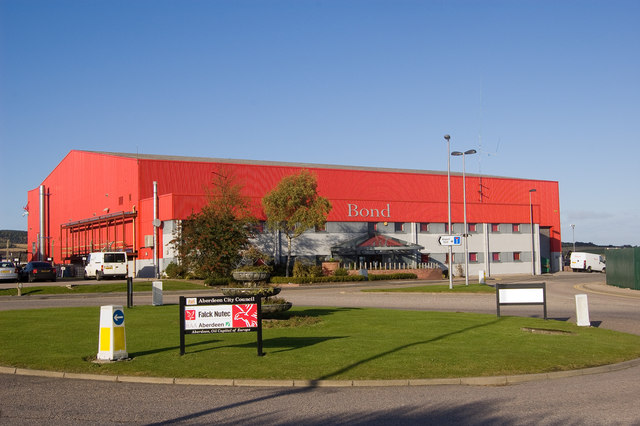
Bond's main hangar at Aberdeen Airport

Bond Air Services started the UK's first wind farm support contract using a winch-equipped EC135T2i from a new base at Lowestoft in 2010.

In 2011, Bond Air Services were acquired by World Helicopter Group, a holding company for investment firms Grupo Inaer, Investindustrial and KKR & Co (formerly Kohlberg Kravis Roberts & Co) making their combined fleet to 360.

On 12 February 2013, Avincis Group took delivery of two Sikorsky S-92s out of the sixteen which had been ordered by company. The helicopters were delivered to Bond Offshore Helicopters' Aberdeen Airport base.

In March 2014, Bond Offshore took delivery of a new S-92. The aircraft arrived at Prestwick Airport inside an Antonov transporter aircraft.

On 25 April 2016, Bond was renamed Babcock Mission Critical Services Offshore.

In September 2021, Babcock completed the sale of its oil and gas aviation business to CHC Group. An unexpected demand for back taxes (estimated at £10 million) accumulated under previous ownership has led Offshore Helicopter Services (OHS) to issue a going concern warning in its latest accounts.

=== Offices ===
Mission Critical Services Offshore is based in Aberdeen, Scotland with additional operations located in Sumburgh. The company opened a new terminal – Terminal 2 – in Aberdeen in 2014, initially serving Nexen passengers. In 2015, the company opened a major new hangar at Aberdeen airport to accommodate its fleet. The 21,000 square feet (2,000 m^{2}) hangar at the east side of the airport is used as both a maintenance and storage facility for S-92, H175, AW139 and AS365N3 helicopters.

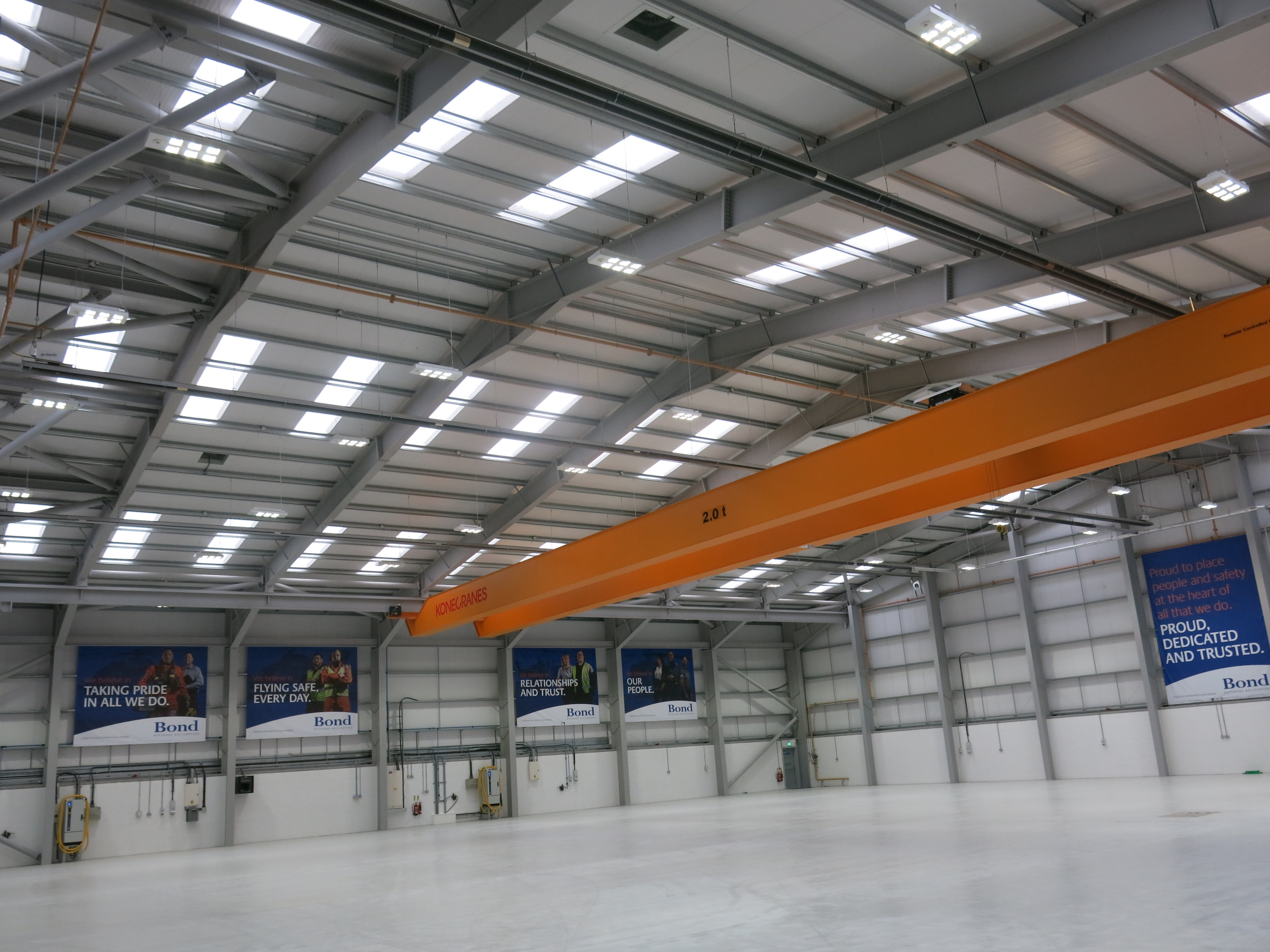
New Aberdeen hangar interior

In May 2017, licensed engineering staff at Mission Critical Services voted for their union Prospect to be recognised for collective bargaining.

== Search and rescue ==
Mission Critical Services also has two search and rescue (SAR) aircraft that provide emergency support to offshore oil drilling operations. These AW139 aircraft are configured with specialist equipment including infrared cameras, loudhailers, searchlights and communication equipment. They are both based in Aberdeen from where with one as the lead and the other as the back-up they service the Central North Sea under a £60 million five-year contract with Oil & Gas UK and 18 oil and gas companies.

== Fleet ==
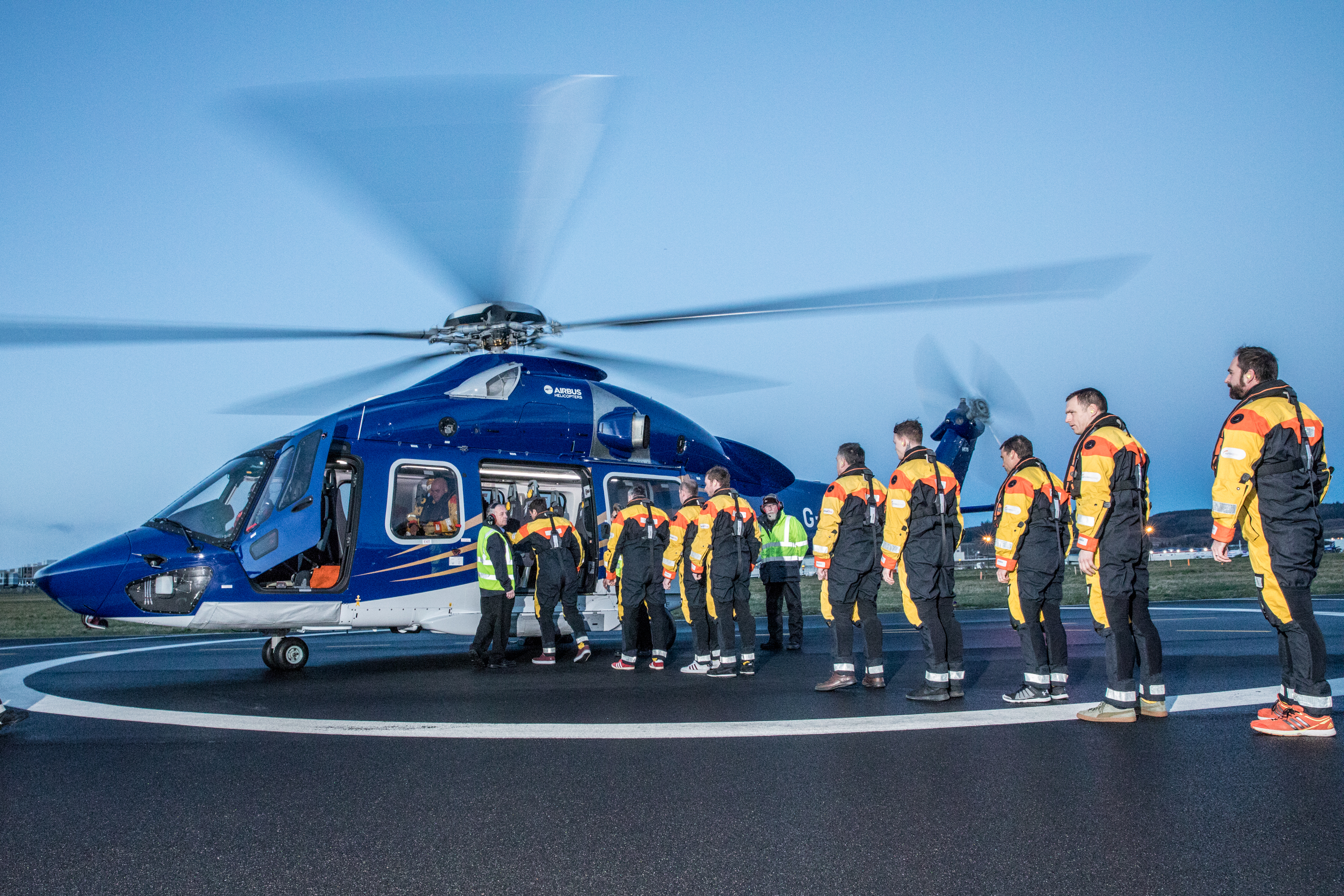
Passengers boarding a H175 in Aberdeen

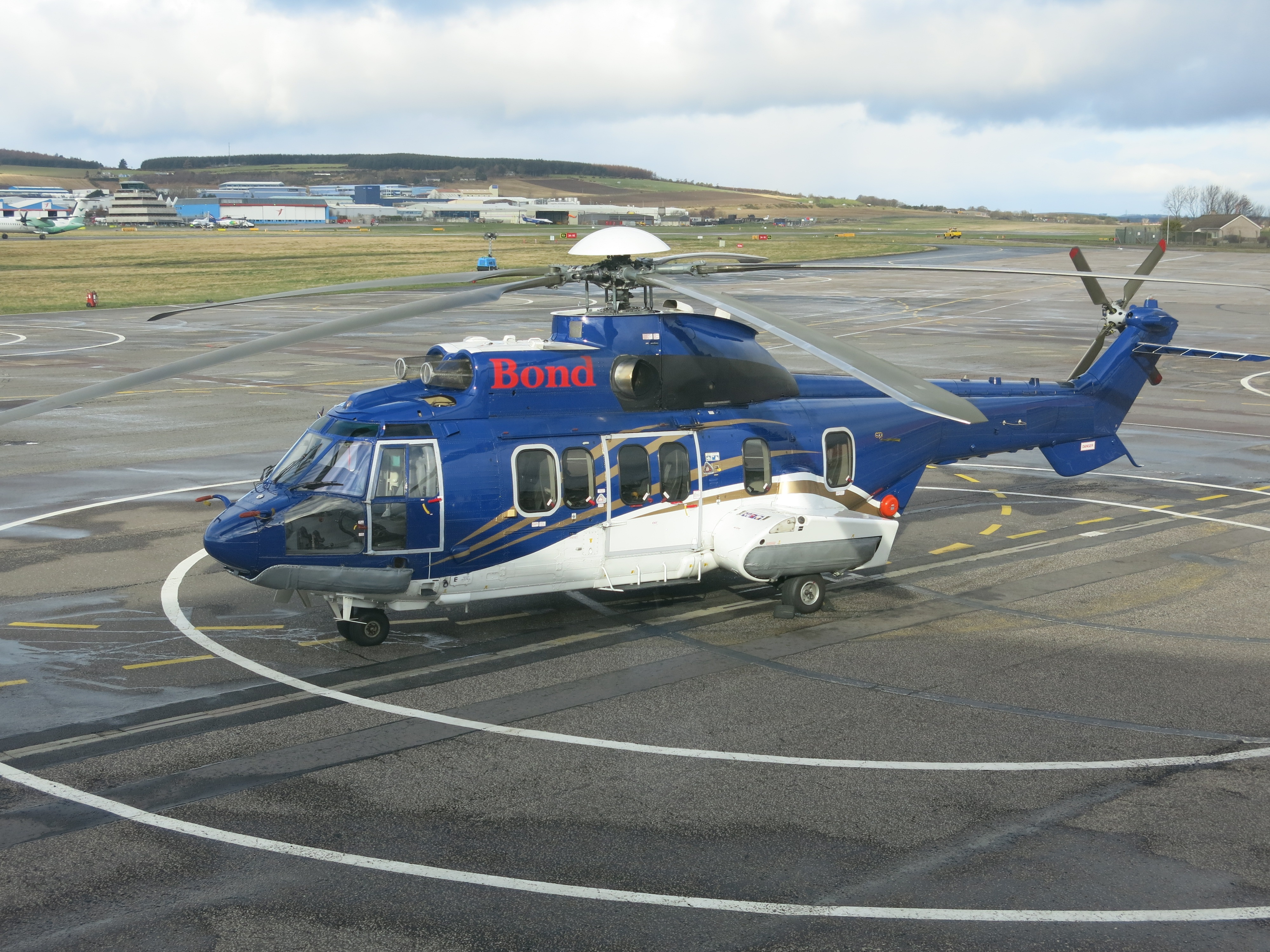
Bond Offshore EC225 at Aberdeen airport

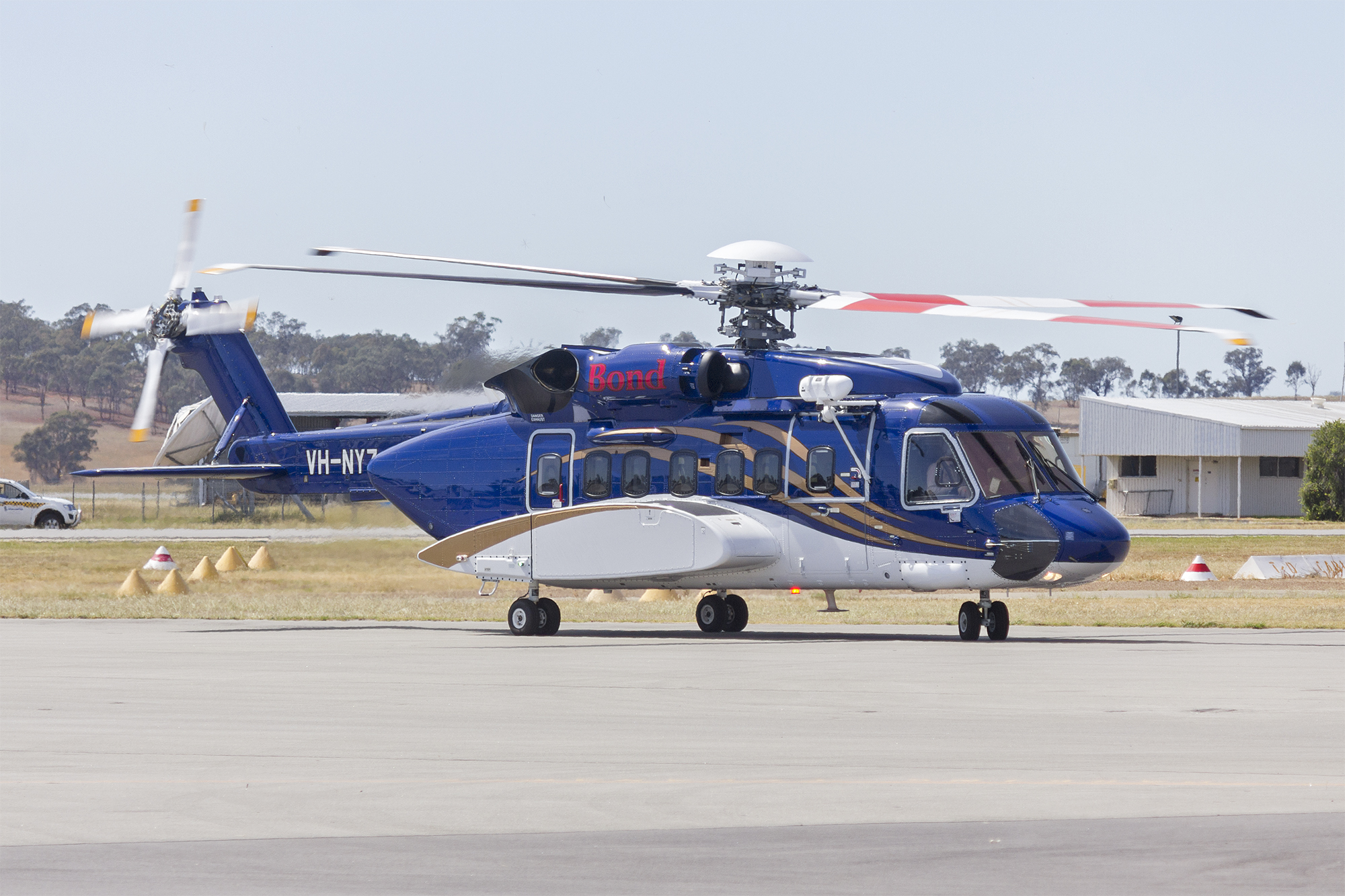
Bond Helicopters Australia (VH-NYZ) Sikorsky S-92A (VH-NYZ) taxiing at Wagga Wagga Airport.

OHS Fleet
Aircraft	Total	Notes
AgustaWestland AW139	2	2 in Search and Rescue configuration
Sikorsky S-92	7	
Airbus Helicopters H175	6	
Total Number of Aircraft	15	

== Accidents and incidents ==
- 18 February 2009 – G-REDU, an EC225 LP. During a night visual approach to the Eastern Trough Area Project platform, the helicopter descended and impacted the surface of the sea. The crew's perception of the position and orientation of the helicopter relative to the platform during the final approach was erroneous. All 18 people on board survived the controlled flight into terrain (water).
- 1 April 2009 – G-REDL, a Eurocopter AS332 L2 Super Puma Mk 2, returning from the Miller oilfield went down in the North Sea, 40 miles northeast of Aberdeen, killing all sixteen on board. Preliminary cause was attributed to a catastrophic failure in the main gearbox.
- 10 May 2012 – G-REDW, a Bond Eurocopter EC225 Super Puma, travelling to the Conocophillips operated Joanne and Judy fields made a controlled ditching into the North Sea following a radio report of a low oil pressure light. All 14 people were rescued from the helicopter liferaft, 9 were airlifted to Aberdeen Royal Infirmary while the remaining five were brought to Aberdeen by lifeboat. On 15 June 2012 helicopter manufacturer Eurocopter cleared Bond Offshore Helicopters of any blame for the ditching of G-REDW. On 17 October 2012 AAIB concluded in their S5/2012 report that a faulty design of the Emergency Lubrication System was the most likely cause of the warnings that led to the ditching of G-REDW and recommended "Eurocopter to review the design of the main gearbox emergency lubrication system on the EC225 LP Super Puma to ensure that the system will provide the crew with an accurate indication of its status when activated".
- 17 February 2023 – G-MCSH, an Airbus Helicopters H175, flew 130 miles (210 km) to the Elgin-Franklin complex east of Aberdeen. The aircraft landed safely but an illuminated tail rotor chip light prevented it from departing for its return journey. While the helicopter was parked on the helipad, gusts from Storm Otto, which reached over 100 mph (160 km/h), snapped off three of its five blades close to the root. Industry sources advise that the rotor brake failed to hold the main blades from windmilling before they had been tied down, resulting in the loss of two of the broken blades into the north sea, while another hit the cockpit.

== See also ==
- Babcock Mission Critical Services Onshore
