= Police aviation in the United Kingdom =

Police aviation in United Kingdom provides British police forces with an aerial support unit to assist them in pursuit, surveillance and tracking. All police aviation in England and Wales comes under the National Police Air Service (NPAS), while Police Scotland and the Police Service of Northern Ireland operate independent units.

In addition to its fleet of helicopters, NPAS has introduced four Vulcanair P68R, which are fixed-wing aircraft able to provide longer flying time and lower running costs.

Police aviation in England and Wales was once a force-by-force, or forces working in partnership, organisation, however from 2012 to 2015 it transitioned to NPAS.

== History ==
In 1921, an R33 airship was able to help the police in traffic control around the Epsom and Ascot horse-racing events.

The large mural, depicting the 1936 Battle of Cable Street public order incident on the side of St. George's Town Hall in the East End of London, depicts the police autogyro overhead that was present on the day.

In March 1964 Cheshire, Staffordshire and Lancashire police forces agreed to join forces to patrol the M6, with a helicopter leased from BEA. There would be 80 police in the joint unit. Police call-signs would be painted on the police car roof. The helicopter would fly between 200 and 500 ft (60 and 150 m).

== Operation ==
Aerial units are often tasked to assist in vehicle pursuits. Air support allows ground units to disengage and follow from a discreet distance, hopefully making the pursuit less dangerous while still allowing ground units to be able to close in quickly as directed to apprehend suspects. Aerial surveillance also allows the police to anticipate the direction of the pursuit, and position ground units ahead of the suspect to block roads or deploy spike strips. Aerial units can also be used to efficiently locate missing persons.

Police helicopters are crewed by three people; a civilian pilot and two tactical flight officers (TFO). The pilot and a TFO sit up-front with eye contact with the ground. The TFOs are responsible for controlling the camera systems, recording images for evidence in court and navigation, including aiding the pilot.

During an incident, ground and aerial units are able to communicate directly with each other, using the call sign of the unit.

=== Surveillance ===
Most police helicopters are fitted with a sphere shaped housing or pod usually under the nose of the aircraft the purpose of which is to support and stabilise two cameras using a gyroscope stabilisation system. The two cameras are a standard "day camera" (a colour camera equipped with a powerful zoom lens) and a thermal imaging camera, which enables heat to be detected and is usually utilised during hours of darkness or in the search for persons in hiding. The cameras are normally connected to controls located in the cabin of the aircraft that allow the air observer to directly control them. They are also linked to a recording system and downlink system. The Vulcanair P68R aeroplanes are fitted with a Wescam MX-15.

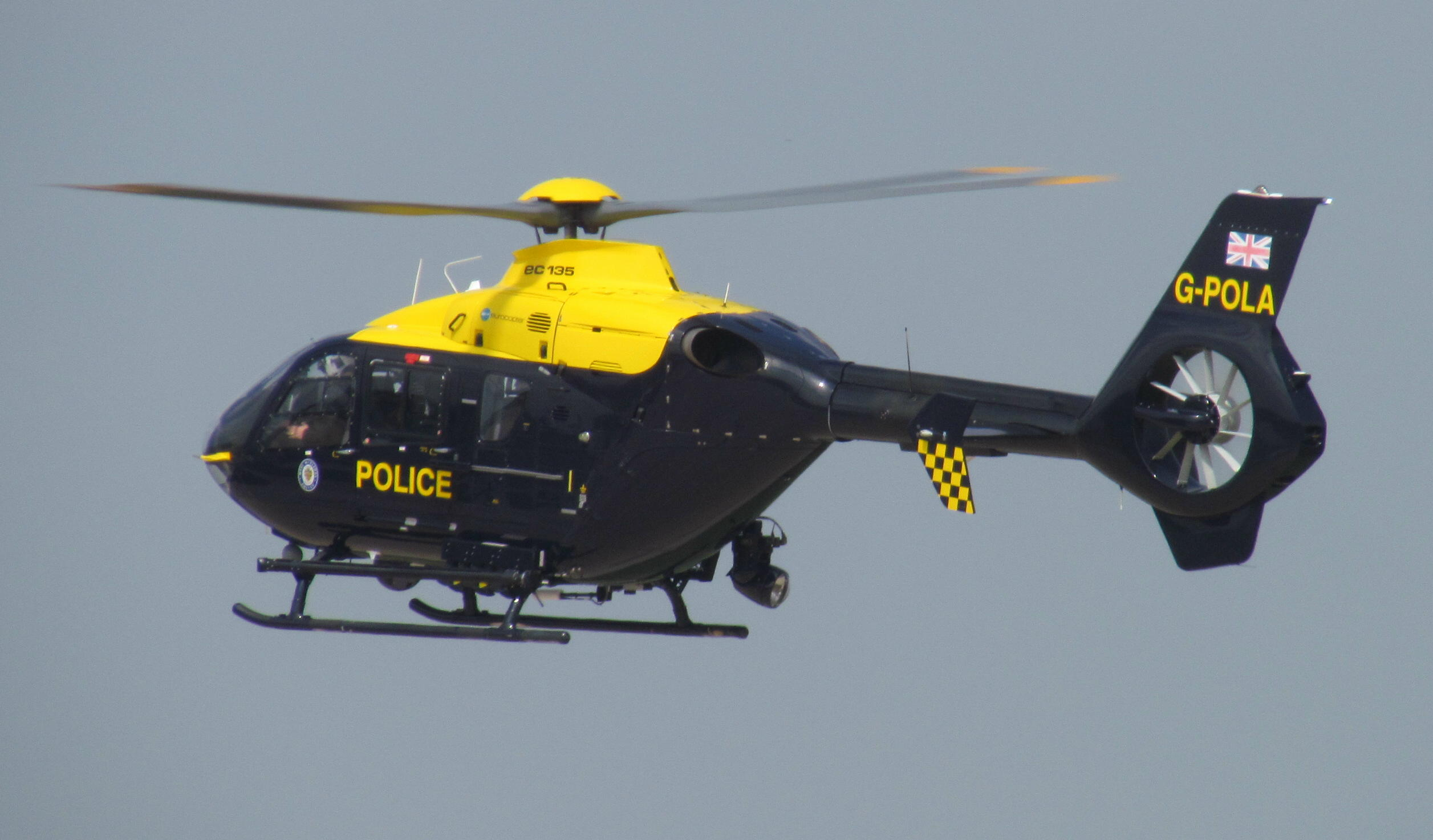
G-POLA An EC135 of NPAS, formerly from West Midlands Police.

Force helicopters are usually equipped with a powerful "Nightsun" search light that is capable of illuminating a large area.

The Metropolitan Police Service has reportedly been secretly using Cessna aircraft for a number of years that have been fitted with surveillance equipment capable of intercepting mobile phone calls and listening in on conversations.

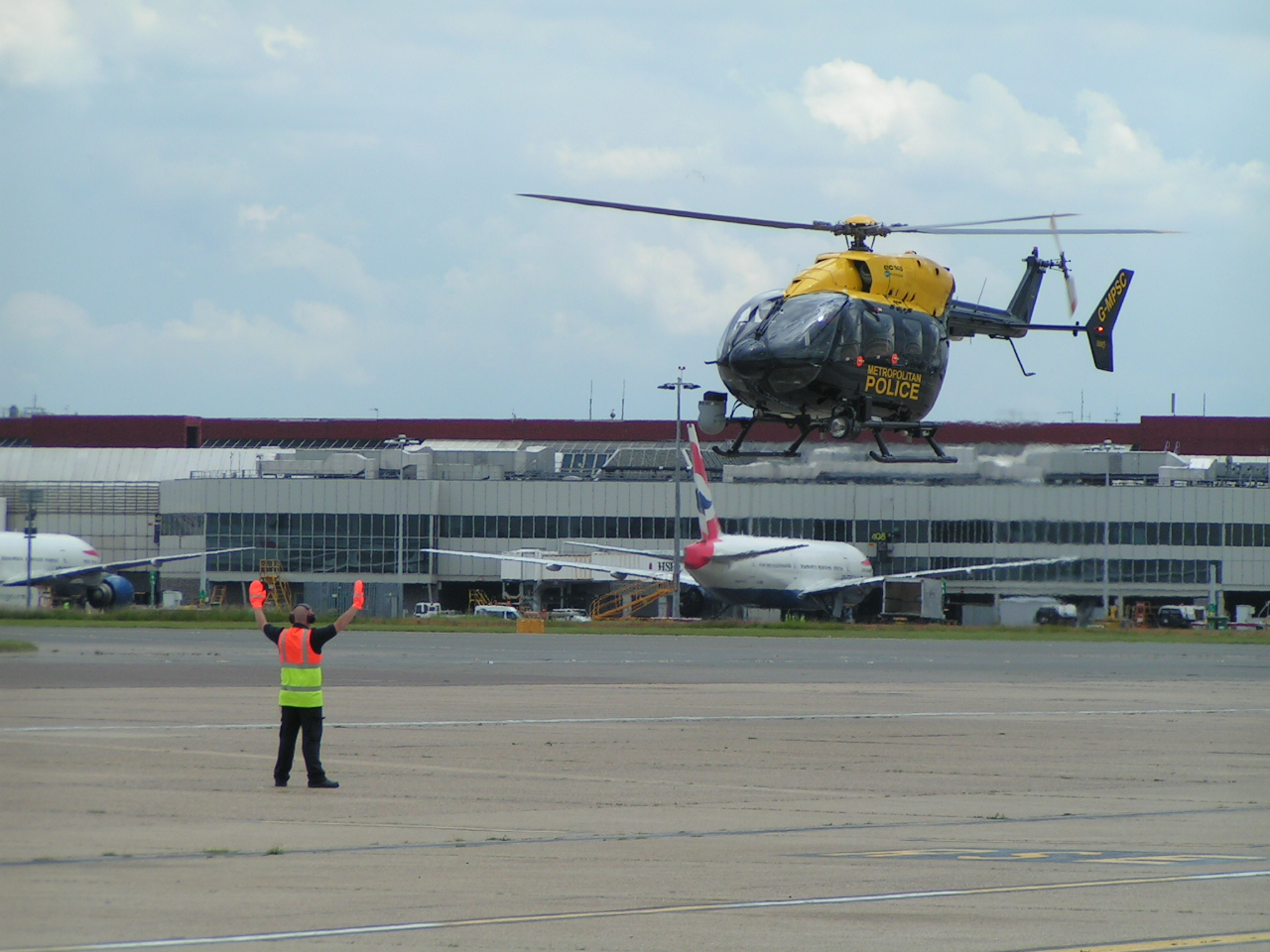
G-MPSC is an EC145 of NPAS London landing at Heathrow Airport for refuelling

=== Drones ===
In 2010, The Guardian reported police forces and government agencies across the UK are exploring the potential of unmanned drones for covert aerial surveillance, security, or emergency operations. The organisations have said at least four forces – Merseyside, Essex, Staffordshire and British Transport police – have bought or used microdrones. Microdrones can be fitted with video cameras, thermal imaging devices, radiation detectors, mobile-phone jammers and air sampling devices. Hovering at heights of around 60 metres (200 ft), they are said by manufacturers to be virtually invisible from the ground. The costs of operating the drones are considerably less than operating helicopters.

As of November 2024, the West Midlands Police "WMP Drones" unit comprises 24 qualified pilots, plus a sergeant and an inspector. These drones, which cost between £2,000 and £36,000, can travel at speeds up to 40 MPH and climb as high as 400 feet. In 2021, West Midlands Police conducted approximately 3,450 drone flights. Collaborations include events like the 2022 Birmingham Commonwealth Games, where drones assisted in crowd and traffic management and enforced temporary no-fly zones.

=== Navigation ===
A member of the crew, usually a police constable, occupies the rear seat of the helicopter. The primary purpose of this crew member is to relay critical information to police units that are on the ground. In the case of traffic pursuits, this crew member will provide a running commentary of the exact location of the suspect's car, utilising either paper maps or a computerised mapping and navigation system.

=== Communication ===
Police helicopters are usually fitted with radios capable of transmitting and receiving communications on their force's and other force's Airwave TETRA radio system. More recently, police helicopters have been fitted with a device that allows live video images to be transmitted directly to the force command centre by way of a downlink system. Commonly fitted to the underside of the helicopter is a public address system, known as "Skyshout".

=== CASEVACS ===
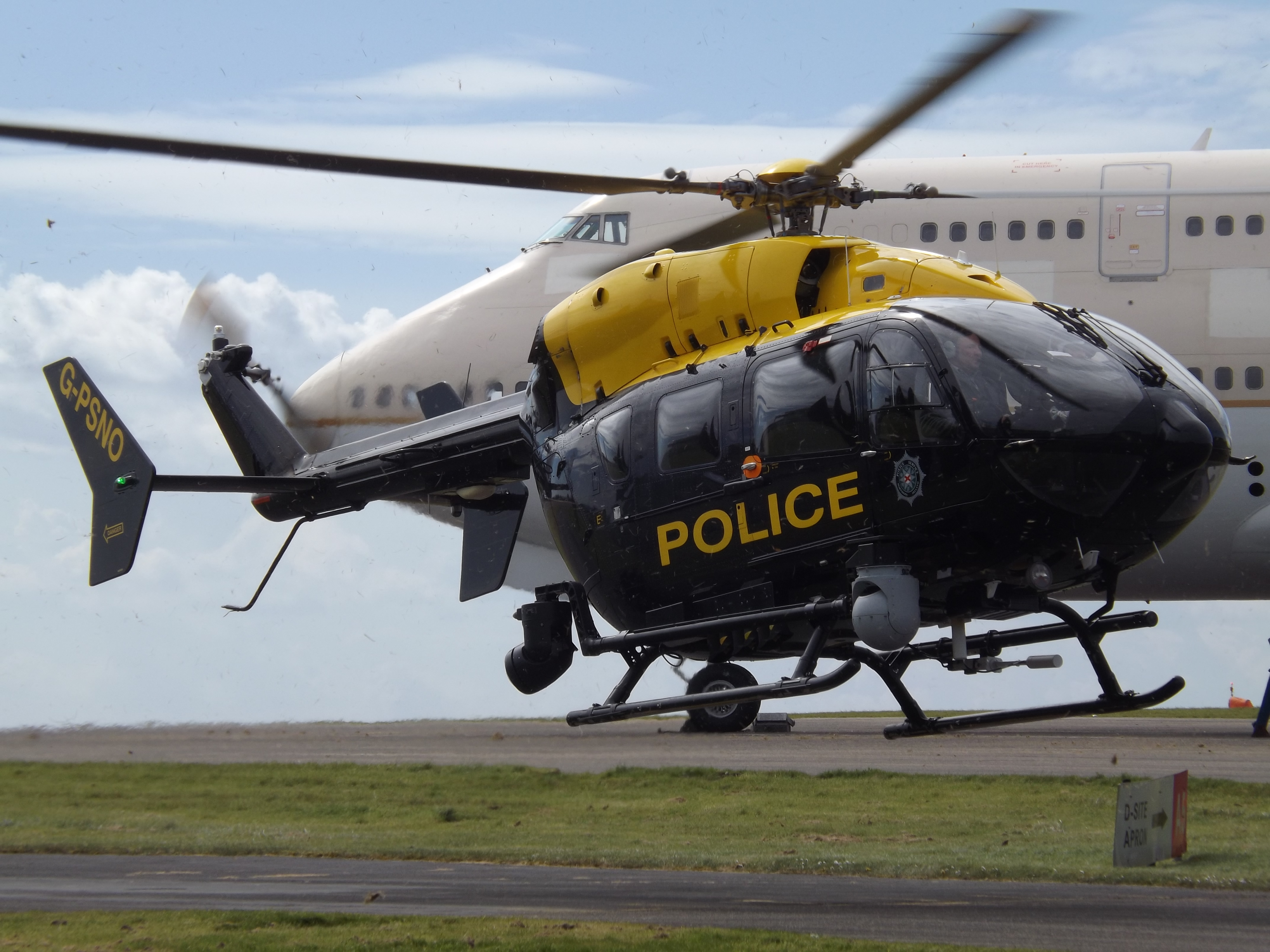
One of PSNI's two EC145 helicopters at Kemble Airport, Gloucestershire

In situations where a patient is critically injured, the police helicopter can be called upon to provide air transport of a patient, directly to the most appropriate major trauma centre. CASEVACS, or casualty evacuation, are uncommon, but can be carried out if no HM Coastguard or air ambulances are available. Police helicopters carry basic life support equipment, along with a stretcher for transport. A doctor or paramedic can travel with the patient, monitoring them from the spare seat.

== Incidents ==
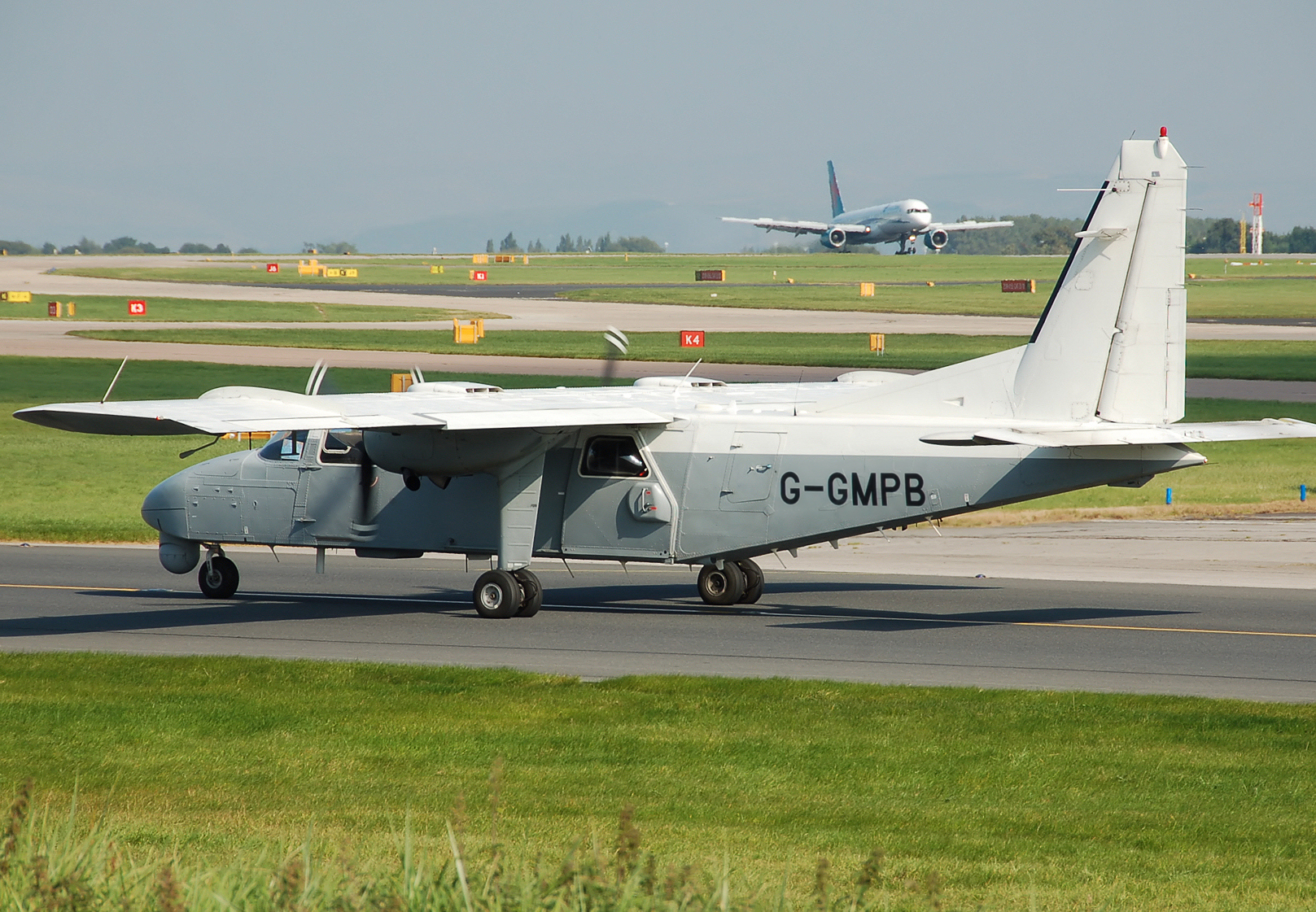
G-GMPB was previously in service with the Greater Manchester Police, before it left service upon the force joining NPAS

- On 15 May 1985, an Edgley Optica fixed-wing aircraft G-KATY crashed, killing two members of the Hampshire Constabulary. The cause was suspected to be a stall: insufficient airspeed during a turn causing instability. The reason for the low speed was never established.
- On 24 January 1990, a Bell 206 JetRanger helicopter G-EYEI covering for the unavailable Strathclyde Police MBB Bo 105 helicopter crashed in a snow storm at Eastwood Toll, Giffnock, Glasgow. One police officer observer was killed, the pilot and two other police officer observers survived.
- On 9 October 1998, a Eurocopter AS355 Twin Squirrel helicopter G-EMAU operated by the East Midlands Air Support Unit crashed shortly after takeoff from its base at Sulby, near Welford in Northamptonshire. One police officer observer was killed, the pilot and one other police officer observer survived the accident.
- On 21 April 2000, a Eurocopter AS355 Twin Squirrel helicopter G-SAEW operated by South and East Wales Air Support Unit suffered a tail rotor failure whilst operating over Cardiff and crash landed on the roof of a house in the Coryton area of the city. The crew of three and the family living in the house escaped unhurt.
- On 25 December 2001, an Agusta A109 helicopter G-DPPH operated by Dyfed-Powys Air Support Unit crash landed near Cross Hands in Carmarthenshire when both engines stopped due to fuel starvation. The fuel starvation resulted from a defective fuel pump and incorrect measures taken to manage cross feeding arrangements between the fuel tanks fitted to the helicopter. The civilian pilot and one of two police officer observers on board escaped with minor injuries, the second police officer observer was unharmed.
- On 17 February 2002, a Eurocopter EC135 T1 helicopter G-SPAU operated by Strathclyde Police crashed in a field at Muirkirk, East Ayrshire whilst searching for a possible missing child. The cause of the accident was not positively identified by the Air Accidents Investigation Branch. The three crew survived the accident with a range of non life-threatening injuries.
- On 30 April 2009, a Eurocopter EC135 helicopter G-SURY operated by Surrey Police Air Support Unit was damaged by vandals. An axe was used to smash five windows.
- On 8 June 2009, a Eurocopter EC135 helicopter G-WMAO operated by the West Midlands Police Air Operations Unit was destroyed by arsonists. West Midlands Police took delivery of a new Eurocopter EC-135 helicopter G-POLA at the 2010 Farnborough Airshow.
- On 10 October 2009, a Eurocopter EC135 helicopter operated by Merseyside Police Air Support Group was damaged on the ground at its base of RAF Woodvale. It was believed the purpose of the attack was to disable the police helicopter whilst a serious crime was carried out elsewhere. One police vehicle was destroyed in the pursuit and three people were arrested in connection with the attack. The aircraft was targeted for a second time on 17 May 2010, when masked intruders broke into RAF Woodvale and attempted to set the aircraft alight, the intruders were stopped due to the security improvements put in place after the first incident but some minor damage occurred to the helicopter. It was again believed that this was an attempt to disable the aircraft whilst a serious crime was carried out elsewhere.
- On 28 October 2010, a Eurocopter AS355 helicopter G-SEWP on lease to the Police Service of Northern Ireland crashed whilst approaching a hill top landing site. The helicopter was being used to transport officers and equipment to the site of another helicopter crash which had occurred on 23 October 2010. The four on board (three police officers and one pilot) survived with minor injuries but the aircraft was destroyed.
- On 13 July 2011, a Britten-Norman Islander fixed-wing aircraft G-BSWR operated by the Police Service of Northern Ireland touched down short of the runway at Belfast International Airport, making contact with the runway approach lights. Damage was discovered after landing to the right hand side of the fuselage, propeller and nose cone. The crew were uninjured.
- On 29 November 2013, a Eurocopter EC135 T2+ helicopter G-SPAO operated by the Police Scotland Air Support Unit crashed into the roof of The Clutha Vaults pub in Glasgow City Centre. The three crew (comprising two police officer observers and one pilot) were killed along with seven people on the ground.
- On 12 March 2021, a Eurocopter EC145 helicopter G-MPSB (previously known as a MBB-BK 117 C-2) operated by the National Police Air Service was conducting a pilot training flight around its home base of North Weald airfield. During a simulated single engine failure, power was inadvertently reduced on the 'good' engine causing the aircraft to lose lift and strike the ground. Both pilots were uninjured and there were no other crew on board. The incident was attributed to pilot error, as no mechanical defect or other reason for the loss of power could be found.

== List of police aviation units ==
The following is a list of police aviation units in the UK and the forces or areas to which they are assigned.

Aviation unit	Forces served	Aircraft
National Police Air Service	All police forces in England and Wales	Airbus EC135; Airbus EC145; Partenavia P.68R
Police Service of Northern Ireland Air Support Unit	Police Service of Northern Ireland	Airbus EC135; Airbus EC145; Britten-Norman BN2T Islander; Britten-Norman BN2T-4S Defender
Police Scotland Air Support Unit	Police Scotland	Airbus EC135

Helicopters are based at North Weald Airfield, RAF Benson, Redhill Aerodrome, Newcastle Airport, Carr Gate, Barton Aerodrome, Birmingham Airport, Husbands Bosworth, Almondsbury, MOD St Athan, Bournemouth Airport, Exeter Airport, Hawarden Airport, Belfast International Airport, Glasgow City Heliport.

Fixed wing aircraft were based at Doncaster Sheffield Airport until 2022 and following a transition period at Leeds Bradford Airport, they have been based at East Midlands Airport since 26 December 2023.

== See also ==
- Aviation in the United Kingdom
- Air ambulances in the United Kingdom
- Police aviation
