= Magnetic chip detector =

Electronic instrument

A magnetic chip detector is an electronic instrument that attracts ferromagnetic particles (mostly iron chips). It is mainly used in aircraft engine oil and helicopter gearbox chip detection systems. Chip detectors can provide an early warning of an impending engine failure and thus greatly reduce the cost of an engine overhaul.

== History ==
Some of the first commercially available chip detectors were developed by SAAB in the 1940s. While chip detectors had existed before then, they had only been used in testing due to false alarms. After first testing them on their Scandia airliners, AB Aerotransport began fitting all of their twin engine airplanes with a similar device in September 1950. Neither of these were magnetic, however.

By the late 1950s, magnetic chip detectors had begun replacing magnetic plugs in military aircraft. A chip detector was installed on the King Air 200 in the early 1970s. By 1984, they had been installed in helicopters for at least a decade.

== Operation ==
Chip Detectors consist of small plugs which can be installed in an engine oil filter, oil sump or aircraft drivetrain gear boxes. Over a period of time, engine wear and tear causes small metal chips to break loose from engine parts and circulate in the engine oil.

The detector houses magnets incorporated into an electric circuit. Magnetic lines of force attract ferrous particles. Collection of these particles continues until the insulated air gap between the magnets (two magnet configuration) or between the magnet and housing (one magnet configuration) is bridged, effectively closing the circuit. The result is an electronic signal for remote indication. Thus, a warning light on the instrument panel illuminates, indicating the presence of metal chips.

Chip detectors may be positioned in the application with a self-closing valve/adapter through either a bayonet or threaded interface. As the chip detector is disengaged from the valve, the valve closes minimizing any fluid loss from the system.

The chip detectors used on aircraft are inspected in every 'A check' and higher. They may also be specified intervals such as every 30–40 hours for an engine unit and 100 hours for an APU unit.
