= National Police Air Service =

Police aviation service providing air support in England and Wales

- Active: 1 October 2012–present
- Country: United Kingdom
- Type: Police aviation
- Operations jurisdiction: England and Wales
- Headquarters: West Yorkshire Police Operations Centre, Wakefield, England
- Abbreviation: NPAS

Commanders
- Current commander: Chief Operating Officer Fiona Gaffney

Equipment
- Aircraft: Airbus Helicopters H135; Airbus Helicopters H145; Vulcanair P68R

Website
- www.npas.police.uk

- Applies to: England and Wales
- Relates to: Police aviation

Other UK counterparts
- Northern Ireland: Police Service of Northern Ireland Air Support Unit
- Scotland: Police Scotland Air Support Unit

The National Police Air Service (NPAS) is a police aviation service that provides centralised air support to the 43 territorial police forces in England and Wales, as well as the three special police forces serving that area. It replaced the previous structure whereby police forces operated their own helicopters, either individually or in small consortia (such as the South East Air Support Unit). The project was coordinated by Alex Marshall (the then Chief Constable of Hampshire Police). West Yorkshire Police is the lead force, and the service is coordinated from the NPAS Operations Centre, at Wakefield, West Yorkshire.

The future of NPAS was in some doubt previously. In June 2021 the Mayor of West Yorkshire, Tracy Brabin, gave formal notice to end West Yorkshire Police's responsibilities as the leading force for NPAS. At a meeting of the National Strategic Board found the levels of availability for the fleet were suboptimal and that police forces which fund NPAS were seeing financial challenges.

The work of NPAS will be incorporated into the planned National Police Service as part of the forthcoming reforms to policing in England and Wales.

== History ==
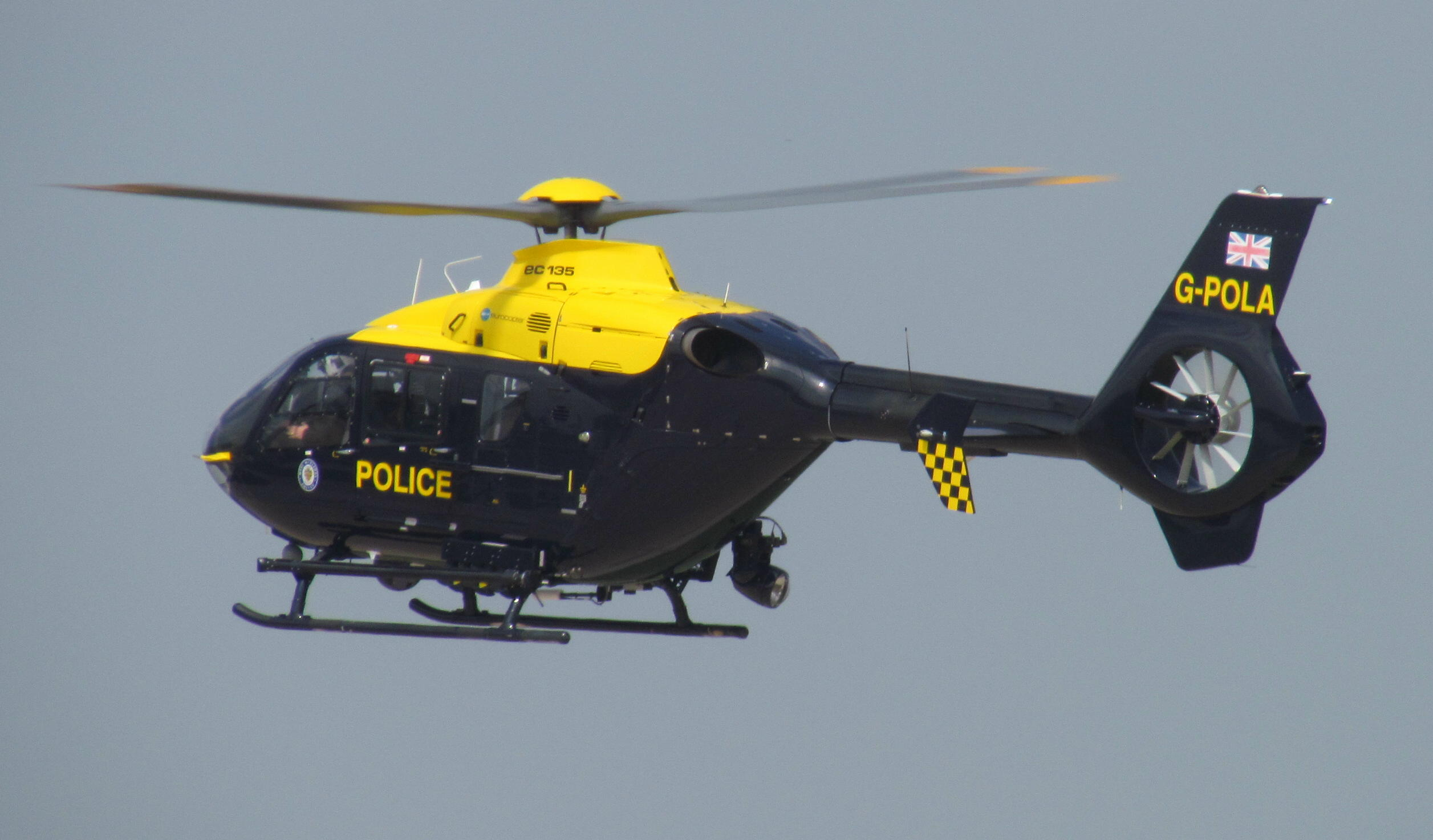
G-POLA an EC135, inherited from West Midlands Police

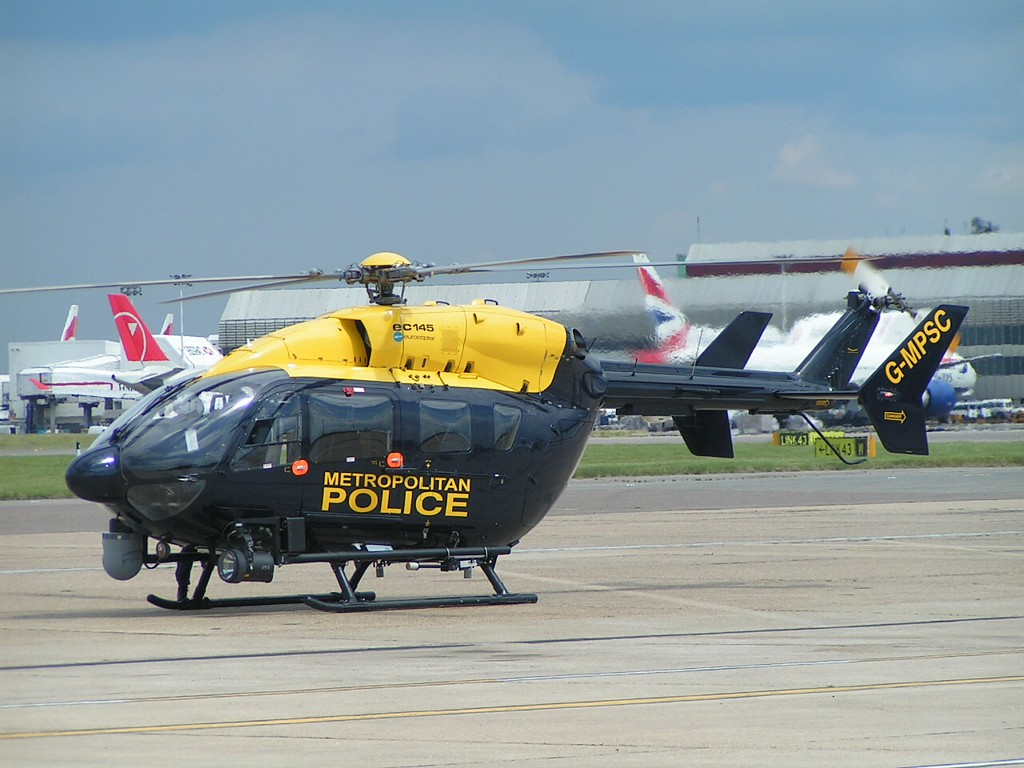
G-MPSC an EC145 inherited from the Metropolitan Police

NPAS Operational bases in England and Wales

=== Rollout ===
NPAS became operational on 1 October 2012, and was rolled out across England and Wales in stages. The service provides 19 helicopters and four fixed-wing aircraft, operating from bases across England and Wales.

NPAS suggested that the Police Scotland Air Support Unit join the service to reduce costs. However that did not materialise.

=== Base closures ===
In February 2015, it was announced that, due to a 14% cut in revenue over the following three years, NPAS would be closing ten bases over two years.

=== Fixed-wing operations ===
In response to slashed budgets, NPAS investigated the use of fixed-wing aircraft, which are cheaper to fly and maintain. A new aeroplane base was created at Doncaster Airport, housing four fixed-wing Vulcanair P68R aircraft. This became operational in early 2020. The aircraft provide national coverage in England and Wales from their Doncaster base, with a range of 800 miles (1,300 km), remaining airborne for up to 8 hours. As of 31 December 2021, the aircraft had been deployed 1,564 times. In the financial year 1 April 2022 to 31 March 2023, the aircraft were called out 737 times by 41 police forces for a total flight time of 687.

In November 2022, shortly after the closure of Doncaster Sheffield Airport, NPAS announced that the fixed-wing fleet would temporarily relocate to Leeds Bradford Airport. They commenced operation at their new home East Midlands Airport on 26 December 2023.

== Criticism ==
There was some initial criticism from forces around the service provided by NPAS when it began operation. This was primarily due to the reduction in number of bases and aircraft available, following general cuts by the UK Home Office to police funding. This led to Her Majesty's Inspectorate of Constabulary and Fire & Rescue Services (HMICFRS) conducting a case study of NPAS with its conclusions made public on 30 November 2017. The report commented at some length on the governance and funding of the service provided. The report specifically stated that there was no criticism of NPAS staff or its operational delivery. HMICFRS included the following observation in its press release:

With the number of bases being halved and the number of aircraft being cut by a third in the last 10 years, savings have primarily been made by cutting the service provided to forces rather than increasing efficiency. An inconsistent service means that many incidents requiring air support are over before a police helicopter can arrive. Moreover, we are concerned that the police service now operates insufficient aircraft to provide a consistently prompt response to incidents in all forces in England and Wales.

— HMICFRS, Planes, drones and helicopters: an independent study of police air support

== Fleet ==
- Eurocopter EC135 - 20
  - One additional H135, formerly on long-term lease with the Norwegian Police Service, now serves exclusively as a training helicopter for new tactical flight officers
- Eurocopter EC145 - four
- Vulcanair P68R - four

== See also ==
- Police aviation in the United Kingdom
- Law enforcement in the United Kingdom
- Police aviation
