= Gareth Davies =

Gareth Davies may refer to:

== Musicians ==
- Gareth Glynne Davies (born 1951), Welsh composer
- Gareth Davies, bassist in Funeral for a Friend

== Politicians ==
- Gareth Davies (English politician) (born 1984), British Conservative MP for Grantham and Stamford
- Gareth Davies (Welsh politician) (born 1988), Welsh Conservative MS for Vale of Clwyd

== Sportspeople ==
- Gareth Davies (cricketer) (born 1975), Welsh cricketer
- Gareth Davies (footballer, born 1949), Welsh football central defender
- Gareth Davies (footballer, born 1959), Welsh football midfielder
- Gareth Davies (footballer, born 1973), Welsh football central defender
- Gareth Davies (footballer, born 1983), English footballer
- Gareth Davies (rugby union, born 1955), Welsh rugby union fly-half
- Gareth Davies (rugby union, born 1984), Welsh rugby union fly-half
- Gareth Davies (rugby union, born 1990), Welsh rugby union scrum-half
- Gareth Davies (rugby league) (born 1973), Welsh professional rugby league footballer

== Others ==
- Gareth Davies (director), British television director and actor
- Gareth Davies (television producer), television producer
- Gareth Davies (doctor) (born 1965), British doctor
- Gareth Alban Davies (1926–2009), Welsh writer and academic
