= Anthony Kemp =

Anthony Kemp may refer to:

- Anthony Fenn Kemp (1763–1868), Australian soldier, merchant and judge
- Anthony Kemp (historian) (1939–2018), English historian
- Anthony Kemp (actor), British interior designer and former child actor
- Tony Kemp (rugby league) (born 1968), New Zealand rugby league footballer
- Tony Kemp (baseball) (born 1991), American baseball player
- Tony Kemp (nurse), English nurse
