= Once More, with Feeling (Buffy the Vampire Slayer) =

- Buffy the Vampire Slayer episode
- Adam Hughes' poster for the episode included visual elements that highlighted its unique appearance, evoking an Old Hollywood feel also reflected in several pieces of music.
- Episode no.: Season 6 Episode 7
- Directed by: Joss Whedon
- Written by: Joss Whedon
- Editing by: Lisa Lassek
- Production code: 6ABB07
- Original air date: November 6, 2001
- Running time: 50 minutes

Guest appearances
- Anthony Stewart Head as Rupert Giles; Hinton Battle as Sweet; Amber Benson as Tara Maclay; David Fury as Mustard Man; Marti Noxon as Parking Ticket Woman; Daniel Weaver as Handsome Young Man; Scott Zeller as Henchman; Zachary Woodlee as Demon / Henchman; Timothy Anderson as Henchman; Alex Estronel as Henchman; Matt Sims as College Guy #1; Hunter Cochran as College Guy #2

Episode chronology
← Previous "All the Way"	Next → "Tabula Rasa"
- Buffy the Vampire Slayer season 6

"Once More, with Feeling" is the seventh episode of the sixth season of the American supernatural drama television series Buffy the Vampire Slayer (1997–2003), and the only one in the series that is a musical. It was written and directed by series creator Joss Whedon and originally aired on UPN in the United States on November 6, 2001.

"Once More, with Feeling" explores changes in the relationships of the main characters, using the plot device that a demon—credited as "Sweet" but unnamed in the episode—compels the people of Sunnydale to break into song at random moments to express hidden truths. The musical format allowed characters to stay true to their natures while they struggled to overcome deceit and miscommunication, fitting with the sixth season's themes of growing up and facing difficulties in adulthood.

All of the regular cast performed their own singing, although two actors requested very little singing. Alyson Hannigan (Willow) requested minimal singing as she was not comfortable with her singing voice. Michelle Trachtenberg (Dawn) asked for a dance number as she felt more comfortable utilizing her ballet background. "Once More, with Feeling" is the most technically complex episode in the series, as extra voice and dance training for the cast (and other actors in the episode) was interspersed with the production of four other Buffy episodes. This was Whedon's first television episode where he wrote music, and different styles — from 1950s sitcom theme music to rock opera — and allowed the characters to express themselves in specific ways. The episode received critical acclaim, particularly for the organic integration of the musical format and its humor and wit. It is considered one of the most effective and popular episodes of the series, and one of the best episodes of television. Prior to a financial dispute in 2007, it was shown in theaters with the audience invited to sing along.

== Background ==
Throughout the series Buffy Summers (Sarah Michelle Gellar), in her role as the Vampire Slayer, is assisted by her close friends, who refer to themselves as the "Scooby Gang". These include Xander Harris (Nicholas Brendon), a young man without particular strengths or talents, but devoted to Buffy and her calling, and Willow Rosenberg (Alyson Hannigan), a young woman who has grown from a shy but gifted student into a strong woman and powerful user of magic. They are mentored by Buffy's "Watcher", Rupert Giles (Anthony Stewart Head), a paternal figure since the first season, when Buffy moved to Sunnydale after her parents' divorce. Xander is engaged to Anya Jenkins (Emma Caulfield), a former vengeance demon who has become human. They have struggled with disclosing their engagement to the rest of the group and individually doubt their impending marriage.

Buffy died at the end of the fifth season ("The Gift"), sacrificing herself in place of her younger sister Dawn (Michelle Trachtenberg) in order to save the world. In the first episode of the sixth season, Willow, believing Buffy to be in Hell, used magic to bring her back from the grave. Buffy was in fact at peace, in what she thinks was heaven, but she has kept this a secret from her friends. Since her resurrection, Buffy has been lost and without inspiration to perform her duties as a Slayer. Willow is romantically involved with Tara Maclay (Amber Benson), a powerful but ethical witch. Tara has previously expressed concern at Willow's use of her emergent magical powers for trivial or personal matters. In the preceding episode ("All the Way"), Willow cast a spell to make Tara forget an argument about her abuse of magic. In the same episode, Dawn, who has been stealing from stores, including Anya's magic shop, lies to Buffy and goes on a clandestine and almost deadly date. Left to take care of Dawn after the death of their mother Joyce Summers (Kristine Sutherland) in the fifth season ("The Body"), Buffy has come to depend more heavily on Giles. Following Dawn's date, Buffy asks Giles to shoulder responsibility for disciplining her, much to his discomfort.

Buffy's former nemesis is Spike (James Marsters), a vampire. In the fourth season The Initiative, a secret military organization whose mission is to evaluate and eliminate demonic beings, rendered Spike harmless by implanting a microchip in his head that causes him intense pain when he attacks humans. However, the chip does not affect him when he harms demons and he now often fights on Buffy's side, after at first fighting just for the pleasure of brawling. His motivations changed when, in the fifth season, Spike realized he had fallen in love with Buffy. She initially rejected him, but just before her death they had begun to form a friendship of sorts. She has been confiding in him; prior to this episode, he is the only one to whom Buffy has revealed that she was in heaven.

Throughout Buffy the Vampire Slayer, music serves as a narrative tool, integral to character development and action. The mood is set by music, characters discuss it, and writers use it to emphasize differences between generations. In an essay on the use of music in the series, Jacqueline Bach writes that in conjunction with the sixth season themes of growing up, "Once More, with Feeling" gives music a central role instead of keeping it in the background.

== Plot ==
When Buffy is on patrol, she laments in song about how uninspired her life has become ("Going Through the Motions"). The next morning at the Magic Box, the gang reveal that they also sang that evening. Led by Giles, the gang theorizes about the cause of the singing; they sense no immediate danger but agree that by working together they can overcome anything ("I've Got a Theory", "Bunnies", and "If We're Together"). Buffy learns that the whole town is affected when she looks outside the shop to see a large group (led by series writer and producer David Fury) singing and dancing about how a dry-cleaning service got their stains out ("The Mustard").

Tara and Willow leave to "research" at home, dally along the way while Tara muses about how much Willow has improved her life ("Under Your Spell"), and continue the song during lovemaking. The next morning, Xander and Anya perform a duet about their secret annoyances with each other and their respective doubts about their impending marriage ("I'll Never Tell"). They realize that the songs are bringing out hidden secrets, and later insist to Giles that something evil is to blame. As they argue, they walk past a woman (series writer and producer Marti Noxon) protesting a parking ticket ("The Parking Ticket"). That evening, Buffy visits Spike, who, on bended knee, pledges himself as Buffy's "willing slave" while at the same time angrily telling her to leave him alone if she will not admit her love for him ("Rest in Peace").

Dawn tells Tara she is glad that Tara and Willow have made up after their argument. Since Tara has no recollection of an argument, she suspects that Willow has used magic to alter her memory. She goes to the Magic Box to consult a book, leaving Dawn alone. Dawn, contemplating a collection of objects that she has stolen, including the charm that summoned Sweet, starts to bemoan that no one seems to notice her ("Dawn's Lament"), but is suddenly seized by a group of minions. They take Dawn to The Bronze, where her attempt to escape transforms into an interpretive dance with them ("Dawn's Ballet") before she meets Sweet (Hinton Battle), a zoot suit-wearing, tap-dancing, singing demon. He tells Dawn that he has come to Sunnydale in response to her "invocation", and he will take her to his dimension to make her his bride when his visit is complete but when Dawn reveals that her sister is the Slayer, he sends his minions to challenge her to rescue Dawn ("What You Feel").

At the Magic Box, Giles recognizes that he must stand aside if Buffy is to face her responsibilities in caring for Dawn instead of relying on him ("Standing") and Tara finds a picture of the Lethe's bramble flower Willow used to cast a spell on her in a book of magic. Giles and Tara separately resolve to leave the people they love, respectively Buffy and Willow — Giles wants to leave Buffy for her own good, while Tara wants to leave Willow because she has become horrified by Willow's magical manipulation of their relationship ("Under Your Spell" and "Standing" (reprise)). When one of Sweet's minions tells Buffy about Sweet holding Dawn at The Bronze, Giles forbids the gang to assist her, so she goes alone, despite having no will to do so; eventually Giles and the Scoobies change their minds and leave to catch up. Although Spike initially thinks that things would be better for him if Buffy was dead, he also changes his mind and decides to help Buffy. Sweet opines that Buffy is drawn to danger ("Walk Through the Fire").

Meeting Sweet at The Bronze, Buffy offers him a deal: she will take her sister's place if she cannot kill him. Sweet asks Buffy what she thinks about life, and she gives a pessimistic take on its meaning ("Something to Sing About"). When the others arrive, Buffy divulges while singing that Willow took her from heaven, and Willow reacts with horror at realizing what she has done. Upon divulging this truth, Buffy gives up on singing and dances so frenetically that she begins to smoke and is on the verge of combusting as Sweet's other victims have been shown to do. Then Spike stops her, telling her that the only way to go forward is to just keep living her life. Xander then reveals that he, not Dawn, invoked Sweet, hoping for a musical "happy ending" for his marriage plans and unaware of the demon's deadly nature. Sweet, after releasing Xander from the obligation to be Sweet's "queen", tells the group how much fun they have been ("What You Feel" (reprise)) and disappears. The Scoobies realize that their relationships have been changed irreversibly by the secrets revealed in their songs ("Where Do We Go from Here?"). Spike leaves The Bronze, but Buffy follows him out, and they kiss ("Coda").

== Production and writing ==
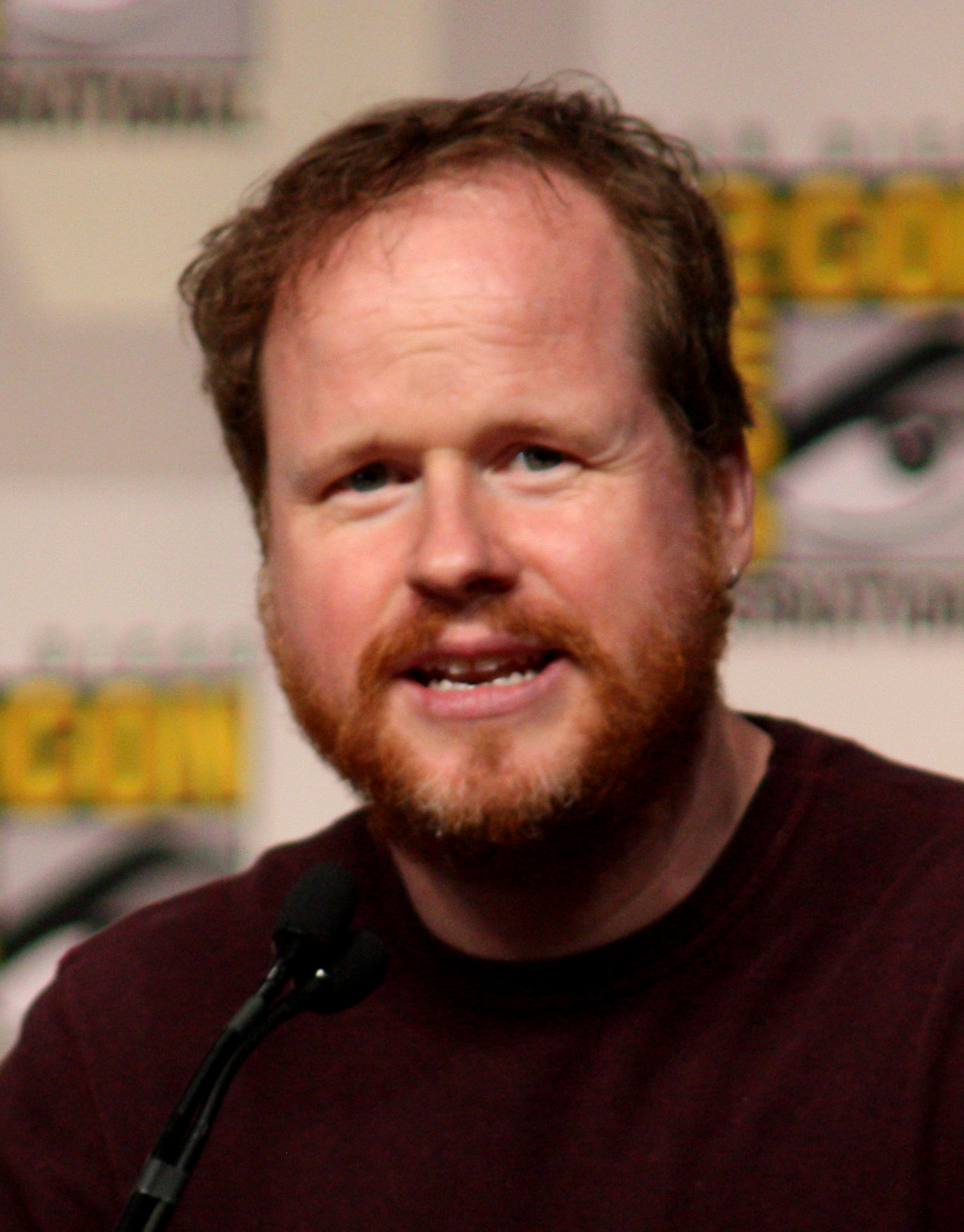
Series creator Joss Whedon spent six months writing for the episode, the first time he had ever written music.

Joss Whedon had wanted to make a musical episode since the start of the series. This desire was heightened during the fifth season when he hosted a Shakespeare reading at his house, to which the cast was invited. They began drinking and singing, demonstrating to Whedon that certain cast members had musical talents. Whedon knew he would have to write an entire score, which would take weeks or months. During the first three seasons of Buffy, he was unable to take more than two weeks off at a time, and the constraints of writing and directing the show precluded him from putting forth the effort of preparing a musical. Whedon spoke to the show's producer, Gareth Davies, about his idea; they agreed that a musical episode would be written.

Whedon spent six months writing the music for "Once More, with Feeling". When he returned after the end of the fifth season, he presented Davies with a script and CD, complete with notated and orchestrated music, which Davies found "mind-boggling". The actors were initially bewildered; in 2012, James Marsters commented that "it's obvious now that they were good songs but the thing was Joss and his wife Kai, they don't sing very well. And they don't play piano very well. The songs sounded really cheesy and horrible... We were saying, 'Joss, you're ruining our careers.'"

Preparing for the episode was physically difficult for some of the cast members, most of whom had little experience singing and dancing. They spent three months in voice training. (Note: Anthony Stewart Head and James Marsters were exceptions. Head had musical theater experience in Godspell, The Rocky Horror Show, and Chess. Marsters had experience singing in a band.) Two choreographers worked with Whedon and the cast on dance sequences. Michelle Trachtenberg (Dawn), who was trained in ballet, requested a dance sequence in lieu of a significant singing part, and Alyson Hannigan (Willow), according to Whedon, begged him not to give her many lines. Sarah Michelle Gellar (Buffy) told the BBC that "It took something like 19 hours of singing and 17 hours of dancing in between shooting four other episodes" and she was so anxious about singing that she "hated every moment of it". When Whedon suggested using a voice double for her, however, she said, "I basically started to cry and said, 'You mean someone else is going to do my big emotional turning point for the season?' In the end, it was an incredible experience and I'm glad I did it. And I never want to do it again." Davies was so impressed with Hinton Battle's performance on Broadway in The Wiz that he asked Battle to play the demon Sweet. Battle, a three-time Tony-winner, wore prosthetic make-up for the first time to give him a demonic red face. Sweet was portrayed as "slick", smooth and stylish; in contrast, most demons on the series were designed to be crude and ugly. The set for The Bronze was used frequently throughout the series, but stairs were built from the stage to maximize floor space for Buffy's dance.

Running eight minutes longer than any in the series, (Note: This episode is the longest only as it was originally broadcast and on DVD. When re-runs were aired, several verses of songs were cut.) the episode was also the most technical and complex. Whedon, who has stated this is one of his favorite Buffy episodes, used a widescreen letterboxed format for filming (the only episode in the series to get this treatment), different lighting to bring out the sets more vibrantly, and long takes for shooting—including a complicated shot with a full conversation, a song, and two choreographed dances that took 21 attempts to get right. These were designed to give viewers all the clues they needed to establish all the nuances of the relationships between characters. Davies commented that the intricacies of filming this episode were "infinitely more complicated than a regular Buffy" episode, and Whedon stated in the DVD commentary that he was ambitious to prove what television is capable of, saying "it just depends how much you care". UPN, the television network that aired Buffy's last two seasons, promoted the episode by displaying Gellar's face on billboards with music notes over her eyes, and held a special premiere event. Network president Dean Valentine remarked he thought it was "one of the best episodes of television I ever saw in my life".

Critics hailed the episode as successful in telling a complex story about all the characters in a unique way, while retaining the series' effective elements of writing and character development. Throughout the show—as in the rest of the series—the characters self-consciously address their own dialogue and actions. Anya describes her own duet "I'll Never Tell" as "a retro pastiche that's never gonna be a breakaway pop hit". With a characteristic dry demeanor, Giles explains that he overheard the information about Sunnydale residents spontaneously combusting as he was eavesdropping upon the police taking "witness arias". In her opening number, "Going Through the Motions", Buffy sings that she feels as though she is playing a part: "nothing here is real, nothing here is right". The song introduces the character's emotional state but also removes the barrier between the actor and the audience, as Gellar the actor portrays Buffy, who feels she is merely playing the part of the Slayer. This hints to the audience that the episode's musical format is strange to the actors and characters. According to Buffy essayist Richard Albright, the lack of polish among cast members' singing voices added to the authenticity of their breaking out into song for the first time in the series. (Note: The one exception was Anthony Stewart Head, who sang in "Restless", "Where the Wild Things Are", and "The Yoko Factor") Whedon included self-conscious dialogue and references about the characters being in a musical and showed their reluctance toward song and dance, so that the audience would feel more comfortable with the improbability of such a thing happening on the show.

== Themes ==
It is part of the fascination of "Once More, with Feeling", that we can, if we wish, choose to select our relationship with the text and dwell on a happy ending—or we can share the struggle of the characters.

— Rhonda Wilcox, 2005

The dynamic nature of the characters was a unique element of writing in the series at the time. Once they were established in the twelve episodes of the first season, characters began to change and relationships were developed in the second. This continued through the series to the point of unpredictability that sometimes became unsettling to fans. Buffy essayist Marguerite Krause asserts that the monsters and demons faced by the Scoobies are thin symbolism for the show's true focus: relationships and how to maintain or ruin them. Common among most of these relationships—romantic, platonic, and familial—is, according to Krause, a "failure to communicate, lack of trust, [and the] inability to envision or create a viable future". Miscommunication is worsened or sustained through multiple episodes and seasons, leading to overwhelming misunderstanding and critical turning points for the characters, some of whom do not recover.

"Once More, with Feeling" propelled the story arc for season six by allowing characters to confess previously taboo issues to themselves and each other. Whedon commented that he was "obsessive about progressing a plot in a song, about saying things we haven't said", comparing the musical theater format to the fourth-season episode "Hush", in which characters begin communicating when they stop talking. According to Buffy essayist Zoe-Jane Playdon, earlier episodes' "false saccharine behaviour" impedes the characters so crucially that it summons a demon to force them to be honest. The consequences in the episode of concealing truth, spontaneous combustion, is an allusion to Bleak House by Charles Dickens—of whom Whedon is a fan—where characters also face immolation for being deceitful. For Buffy, however, truth is slow in coming, as she continues to lie to the Scoobies, claiming to forget what she sang about in the graveyard during "Going Through the Motions". Buffy continues her charade in the chorus number "If We're Together", beginning the song by persuading others to join in one by one, as if each is convinced that she is still invested and in charge, and their strength as a group is infallible. Although she asks in verse "Apocalypse / We've all been there / The same old trips / Why should we care?", all the Scoobies join her, including Giles despite his suspicions that Buffy is no longer interested in her life.

Secrets reveal themselves steadily throughout the episode. Xander fears that his future marriage will turn him into an argumentative drunk like his father. He attempts to avoid his fears through the song "I'll Never Tell", singing "'coz there's nothing to tell", after summoning Sweet to Sunnydale to show him that he and Anya will be happy. Amid the various annoyances Xander and Anya express through this song, some verses are clear-sighted observations of behavior, such as Anya's accusation that Xander—once in love with Buffy—uses Buffy as a mother figure to hide behind. Anya also avoids the truth by burying herself in wedding plans without thinking critically about what being married will entail; instead she considers Xander an accessory to her desired lifestyle. Of all the characters, Anya is the most preoccupied with the style of singing and songs, demanding to know if Spike sang "a breakaway pop hit, or a book number", and asking Dawn if the pterodactyl she facetiously says she gave birth to also broke into song. Anya and Xander's duet is the only song in the episode to address the audience directly. During the long single-shot scene when she and Xander talk over each other insisting to Giles that evil must be at play, Anya refers to the audience, saying "It was like we were being watched ... Like there was a wall missing ... in our apartment ... Like there were only three walls and not a fourth wall." Albright asserts that Anya's constant preoccupation with her and others' performances indicates that she has serious doubts about her future supporting role as Xander's wife.

Giles' truth, according to Whedon, is that he realizes he must not "fight my kid's battles or my kid will never grow up", which he sings in "Standing" while he throws knives at Buffy as part of her training. Whedon remarked that this touch "is the kind of complete turnaround that is a staple of the Buffy universe". Tara's heartfelt love song also has an ironic subtext; although she appears to mean that she is fulfilled by her relationship with Willow, the lyrics include multiple allusions to Willow working her manipulative will over Tara, overlaid with Tara's euphoric singing about her pleasure in their union. In Sex and the Slayer, Lorna Jowett calls the song between Willow and Tara the transformational event in their relationship, from Tara's subservient bearing towards Willow, into a relationship of equals. Two Buffy essayists note that Willow and Giles sing together at the start of the episode, but later Tara and Giles share a duet to express the diminished part each plays in their respective relationships.

Although "Once More, with Feeling" allows all the characters to confess truthfully, with the exception of Willow, it does not resolve the behavior that demanded confession in the first place. At the end of the episode, Buffy kisses Spike, initiating a romance that she hides from her friends. Their relationship lasts until the end of the series, marked for a time by Buffy's loathing of him because he has no soul. Her relationship with Spike, however, allows her to feel lust and attraction, which she yearns for after being pulled back from a heavenly dimension. In The Psychology of Joss Whedon, Mikhail Lubyansky writes that, although Buffy's first step toward re-engaging with her life is telling the Scoobies the truth in the song "Something to Sing About", she does not find meaning again until the end of the season. In his essay "A Kantian Analysis of Moral Judgment in Buffy the Vampire Slayer", Scott Stroud explains that Buffy, as the central character throughout the series, is torn between her desires and her duty, in a Kantian illustration of free will vs. predeterminism, symbolized by her responsibility as a Slayer and her adolescent impulses. In earlier seasons, this takes the form of simpler pleasures such as dating and socializing, interspersed with defeating evil forces. It reaches a climax in the ultimate sacrifice when Buffy offers to die to save the world. However, "Once More, with Feeling", according to Stroud, is the turning point at which she begins to face her responsibility to the community, her friends and her family. Not only does she continue her Slaying despite a lack of inspiration, but for the rest of the season she works at a humiliating job to provide for her sister and friends.

== Music and style ==
"Once More, with Feeling" was Joss Whedon's first attempt at writing music, which he had always wanted to do. He learned how to play guitar to write several songs. Christophe Beck, a regular composer for the series, filled in the overture and coda and composed "Dawn's Ballet". Whedon is a fan of Stephen Sondheim, and used him as the inspiration for much of the music, particularly with the episode's ambiguous ending. Cast member James Marsters (Spike) said, "Some of Joss' music is surprisingly complicated. Maybe it's a Beatles thing. He doesn't know enough to know what he can't do and he's smashing rules."

The episode's musical style varies significantly. Buffy's opening number, "Going Through the Motions", was influenced heavily by the Disney song "Part of Your World" sung by Ariel in The Little Mermaid. Whedon wanted to use a similar opening in which the heroine explains her yearning. While singing her song, Buffy fights three vampires and a demon who themselves break into a choreographed dance; Whedon wanted this to be fun but not distracting. The song ends with chord influences from Stephen Schwartz's Pippin and a visual tribute to Disney: as Buffy stakes a vampire, it turns to dust that swirls around her face.

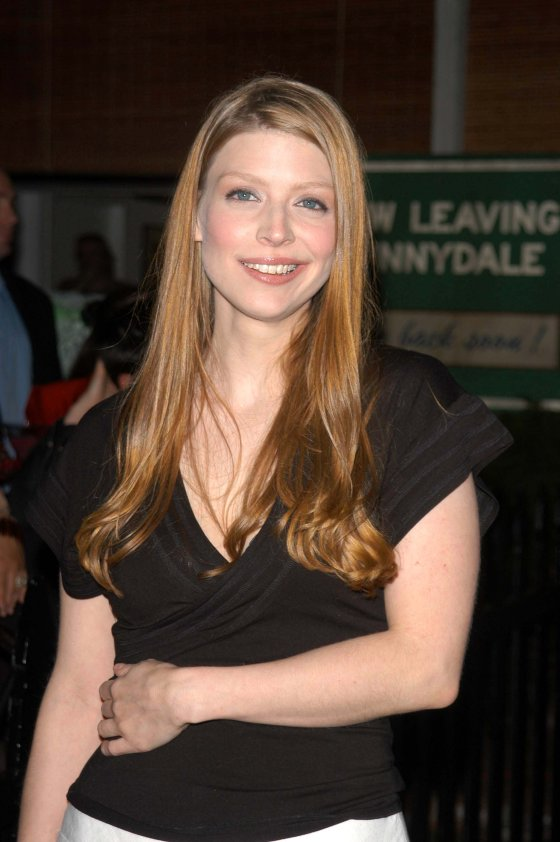
Amber Benson's performance was a surprise to many critics and scholars, who have interpreted her starring role in the episode as representing the quiet strength of her character Tara.

Whedon chose the most complicated scene, with the most dancers and choreography in the classic style of musical theater, to accompany an 18-second song ("The Mustard") "to get it out of the way" for more personal numbers later in the episode. Stephanie Zacharek of Salon.com considers this "brilliant because it frees even people who hate musicals to settle into the story without getting hung up on the genre's conventions". The musical styles span from a jaunty 1950s sitcom arrangement of the Buffy theme in the opening credits—the only episode in the series to begin without the normal version of the theme song and full cast roll, signifying a genre shift—to Anya's hard-rock version of "Bunnies". Whedon assigned Emma Caulfield the rock-opera format because Caulfield often sang in such a way to him on the set. Spike's "Rest in Peace" is also a rock song, which Whedon wrote after completing the episode's first song, Tara's "Under Your Spell", a contemporary pop song with radio-play potential. Xander and Anya's duet—the most fun to shoot but difficult to write, according to Whedon—is inspired by Fred Astaire–Ginger Rogers comedies as evidenced by the silken pajama costumes and art deco apartment setting. Musically, the song uses influences from Ira Gershwin, a Charleston rhythm, and jazz-like chord slides. Giles' "Standing" is a ballad to Buffy that she does not hear, unlike the songs revealing truths elsewhere in the episode. Whedon shot the scene so that Giles moves in real time while Buffy works out in slow motion, to accentuate Giles' distance from her. Buffy's not hearing his song was intentional; Whedon explained, "You can sing to someone in musicals and they can never know how you feel or how much you love them, even if they're standing right in front of you".

"Under Your Spell" received attention from Buffy studies writers because it presents a frank and unflinching expression of lesbian romance. Buffy the Vampire Slayer was the first show in U.S. television history to portray a long-term lesbian relationship among the core cast of characters. Previous televised depictions of lesbian relations were primarily limited to single "coming out" or "lesbian kiss" episodes, showing lesbian-identified characters as affectionate but not erotic. (Note: Other series portrayed lesbian relationships among secondary characters (Friends), one-time encounters, or relationships that lasted through several episodes (Ellen), but did not show the characters touching (HeartBeat). Willow and Tara's relationship is noted for its longevity, the youth of the characters, the fact that both Willow and Tara are considered primary characters, and that the relationship was broadcast on network television during prime time.) Tara and Willow demonstrate throughout the series, and specifically in "Once More, with Feeling", that they are "intensely sexual", according to Buffy essayist Justine Larbalestier. Near the end of Tara's song, she sings, "Lost in ecstasy / Spread beneath my Willow tree / You make me / Com — plete", as Tara levitates off the bed while Willow tacitly performs cunnilingus on her. Lorna Jowett called the song "the most erotic scene" of the series. Whedon admitted on the DVD commentary for the episode that the song is "pornography" and "probably the dirtiest lyric I've ever written, but also very, very beautiful".

Buffy essayist Ian Shuttleworth writes that Amber Benson (Tara) has "the sweetest singing voice of all the lead players", referring to "Under Your Spell" as "heavenly and salacious"; author Nikki Stafford concurs, writing that Benson "has the most stunning voice, showing a surprising range". Whedon acknowledged that the "lyrical, heavenly quality" of Benson's voice led him to assign her the episode's love song. Alyson Hannigan (Willow) was unwilling to sing much and her performance is "apprehensive", according to Shuttleworth. He considers this an example of Tara's quieter strength coming out in front of Willow's showy demonstrations of powerful magic. Buffy studies scholar Rhonda Wilcox interprets Willow's diminished role representing the show's silence about Willow's descent into addiction and darkness through the rest of the season. Benson remarked that Tara's story arc is significant within the episode, starting out with ecstasy but soon recognizing the illusory circumstances surrounding her bliss and that "life can't be perfect all the time".

The most complicated song, "Walk Through the Fire", leads all the characters to the climax from different locations for different reasons, reminiscent of the "Tonight Quintet" from West Side Story. When they all sing the chorus at once to the line "We will walk through the fire / And let it — burn", two fire trucks race behind the Scoobies as they proceed to the Bronze. Whedon called the shot the "single greatest thing we ever did". Each of the singers in this song, which "marries soft rock to the function of a dirge", connects musically to earlier songs while foreshadowing Buffy's next number and the final chorus, providing an ominous anxiety.

Whedon's use of "literal choreography" in "Where Do We Go from Here?" expresses the anxiety of the characters in relation to the group after they have all divulged their secrets.

Buffy's numbers are the most complex, changing key and tempo when she begins to reveal the secrets she swore she never would. This appears specifically in "Something to Sing About", which starts with uptempo platitudes: "We'll sing a happy song / And you can sing along: / Where there's life, there's hope / Every day's a gift / Wishes can come true / Whistle while you work ..." While singing, she kills Sweet's minions with a pool cue. Whedon attempted to make the song tuneful yet chaotic to express the main point of the episode. It transitions suddenly into her desire to be like normal girls, then changes again, slowing the tempo as she challenges Sweet not to give her a song, but "something to sing about". Musicologist Amy Bauer categorizes the tempo shifts as "rock ballad to punk polka to hymn" that indicates Buffy's turmoil. The key and tempo slow again, as Buffy finally reveals "I live in hell / 'Cause I've been expelled from heaven / I think I was in heaven" with the chord changing from B minor to B diminished, each time she repeats "heaven". When replying to her, Spike has the same shift from minor to diminished each time he repeats the word "living."

The episode nears the end with "Where Do We Go from Here?", as the Scoobies stand dazed and disoriented, facing different directions. As they sing "Understand we'll go hand in hand / But we'll walk alone in fear", they line up, hold hands, then fling each other's hands away in a piece of what Whedon calls "literal choreography". Each of the eight characters in this line wears a color in the visible spectrum, a conscious decision by the costume designer. The couples in the group wear opposite colors (Giles in green and Buffy in red, Anya in blue and Xander in orange, Tara in yellow and Willow in purple), and Rhonda Wilcox interprets the color-coding and choreography to represent the "tension between the individual and the group". The characters as a chorus sing "The curtains close on a kiss, God knows / We can tell the end is near", moments before Buffy runs out to kiss Spike and the show closes with actual curtains. As Spike and Buffy kiss, a swell of music accompanies them, similar to the ending of Gone with the Wind. Lyrics sung moments before, however, forecast the uncertainty of the relationship between Spike and Buffy, as well as their contrasting reasons for initiating any romance; Spike wants to feel love from Buffy, while she simply wants to feel.

== Reception ==
When the episode was originally broadcast in the United States on UPN on November 6, 2001, it received a Nielsen rating of 3.4 and a share of 5. This placed the episode in sixth place in its timeslot, and 88th among broadcast television for the week of November 5–11, 2001. It was the most watched program on UPN that night, and the third most watched program that week, trailing episodes of Star Trek: Enterprise and WWF SmackDown. This was a decrease from the 3.7 rating received by the previous episode a week prior.

"Once More, with Feeling" received widespread critical acclaim from media and critics when it aired, during overseas syndication, and in reminiscences of the best episodes of Buffy after the series ended. Although Salon.com writer Stephanie Zacharek states "(t)he songs were only half-memorable at best, and the singing ability of the show's regular cast ranged only from the fairly good to the not so great", she also asserts that it works "beautifully", paces itself gracefully, and is "clever and affecting". Zacharek's unenthusiastic assessments of the music and cast's singing abilities were not shared by other writers. Debi Enker in Australia's The Age writes, "Giles (Anthony Stewart Head) and Tara (Amber Benson) are terrific, Xander (Nicholas Brendon) and Dawn (Michelle Trachtenberg) struggle valiantly, and Willow (Alyson Hannigan) barely sings a note". Tony Johnston in The Sunday Herald Sun writes that Gellar "struggles on some of her higher notes, but her dance routines are superb, Michelle Trachtenberg's Dawn reveals sensual dance moves way beyond her tender years, and James Marsters' Spike evokes a sort of Billy Idol yell to disguise his lack of vocal proficiency [...] The rest of the cast mix and match like ready-made Broadway troupers." Johnston counts "I'll Never Tell" as one of the episode's "standout moments". Connie Ogle in the Miami Herald calls the songs "better and far more clever than most of the ones you'll hear on Broadway these days".

Writers agree that the episode was risky and could have failed spectacularly. Jonathan Bernstein in the British newspaper The Observer writes "What could have been, at best, an eccentric diversion and, at worst, a shuddering embarrassment, succeeded on every level [...] It provided a startling demonstration that creator Joss Whedon has a facility with lyrics and melody equal to the one he's demonstrated for the past six seasons with dialogue, character and plot twists. Rather than adopt the 'Hey, wouldn't it be wacky if we suddenly burst into song?' approach practised by Ally McBeal, the Buffy musical was entirely organic to the series' labyrinthine progression." Johnston in the Sunday Herald Sun says, "There is just so much to this marvellously cheeky episode that suggests the show can take any route it pleases and pull it off", while Debi Enker in The Age comments, "Whedon demonstrates yet again what Buffy aficionados have known and appreciated for years: that his wit, playfulness and readiness to take a risk make his television efforts rise way above the pack." Steve Murray in The Atlanta Journal-Constitution characterizes the episode as "scary in a brand-new way", saying "Once More, with Feeling" is "as impressive as Whedon's milestone episodes 'Hush' and 'The Body'"; the episode is "often hilarious", according to Murray, and acts as "(b)oth spoof and homage, [parodying] the hokiness of musicals while also capturing the guilty pleasure and surges of feeling the genre inspires".

Scott Feschuk from National Post states that the episode "conveyed the same sense of rampant, runaway genius—the rare fusion of artful storytelling and ardent entertainment, a production capable of moving viewers to tears or to an awestruck rapture". Writing in the Toronto Star, Vinay Menon calls "Once More, with Feeling" "dazzling" and writes of "Joss Whedon's inimitable genius"; he goes on to say "(f)or a show that already violates conventions and morphs between genres, its allegorical narrative zigging and zagging seamlessly across chatty comedy, drama and over-the-top horror, 'Once More, with Feeling' is a towering achievement [...] The show may be anchored by existential weightiness, it may be painted with broad, supernatural brushstrokes, but in the end, this coming-of-age story, filled with angst and alienation, is more real than any other so-called teen drama [...] So let's add another line of gushing praise: 'Once More, with Feeling' is rhapsodic, original, deeply affecting, and ultimately, transcendental. Quite simply, television at its best."

The episode was nominated for an Emmy Award for Outstanding Musical Direction, but the National Academy of Television Arts and Sciences (NATAS) neglected to include the title on the ballots for Emmy nominations in 2002. NATAS attempted to remedy this by mailing a postcard informing its voters that it should be included, but the episode did not win. NATAS' oversight, according to The Washington Post, was "another example of the lack of industry respect afforded one of television's most consistently clever shows". Ogle in the Miami Herald vigorously protests this omission, writing, "[T]he most astonishing, entertaining hour (hour plus, actually) of TV in the past year slips by virtually unnoticed. Nothing here is real; nothing here is right. Buffy the Vampire Slayer's musical episode, 'Once More, with Feeling', registers a paltry outstanding music direction nomination. Nice for the musical directors. A stake through the aspirations of writer/director Joss Whedon, the beating creative heart of Buffy, the only TV writer brave and clever enough to use horror as one great big wonderful metaphor for growing up [...] 'Once More, with Feeling' is TV of a different sort, something that comes along once in a lifetime and should not be buried but celebrated and rewarded." The episode was also nominated for a Best Dramatic Presentation Hugo Award and a Best Script Nebula Award, both given for excellence in science fiction and fantasy writing. Vox ranked the episode as the best episode of the series. It was voted the best episode of the series in a poll conducted by Radio Times to celebrate the 20th anniversary of the finale episode "Chosen". In 2009, TV Guide ranked it #14 on its list of "TV's Top 100 Episodes of All Time". For its 65th anniversary in 2018, TV Guide picked their 65 best television episodes of the 21st century, ranking "Once More, with Feeling" fifth. In 2021, Los Angeles Times called it the best musical episode ever made.

=== Soundtrack ===
An album including all 14 songs in the episode, with Christophe Beck's scores for three other Buffy episodes, was released by Rounder Records in September 2002 as season seven premiered. John Virant, president and chief executive of Rounder Records, told the Los Angeles Times, "I remember watching the episode when it aired last October, and after it was over, I said to my wife, 'That's the best hour of TV I've ever seen. Someone should put that [soundtrack] out.' I inquired at Fox, just following up, and they said, 'Well, we tried, it didn't happen. If you want to take a run at it, feel free.'" The soundtrack received "stellar reviews". AllMusic gives the album five out of five stars, stating that the music is "every bit as fun as the episode itself", praising the voices of Benson, Marsters and Head. Reviewer Melinda Hill states it is "a must-have for Buffy fans, but it wouldn't be out of place in anyone's collection".

Chart (2002)	Peak
Australian ARIA Albums Chart	97
U.S. Billboard 200	49
U.S. Billboard Top Soundtracks	3

=== DVD releases ===
In addition to featuring on the sixth season box set, "Once More, with Feeling" was individually released on DVD in Region 2 format on April 14, 2003, the only episode to be individually released. In Region 1, the episode was released on the sixth season box set on May 25, 2004, over a year later than the Region 2 release.

=== Influence ===
Since the musical episode of Buffy aired, several other series have worked musical format into episodes, including Scrubs ("My Musical") in 2007, Grey's Anatomy ("Song Beneath the Song") in 2011, Batman: The Brave and the Bold ("Mayhem of the Music Meister!") in 2009, and Star Trek: Strange New Worlds ("Subspace Rhapsody") in 2023. The musical television episode was declared a genre, a gimmick, according to Mary Williams at Salon.com, for series that had run out of interesting story lines and characters. Both Williams and Margaret Lyons at New York magazine, however, declared "Once More, with Feeling" the "gold standard" for musical episodes. Despite this, Whedon recognized the influence "Once More, with Feeling" has had on other shows, but denied that it was primarily responsible for the rise in musical television episodes or series such as Glee, citing the popularity of High School Musical instead. Director John McPhail cited "Once More, with Feeling" as an influence on his musical film Anna and the Apocalypse (2018).

== Public showings ==
Buffy the Vampire Slayer developed an enthusiastic fan following while it aired. Following its series finale, fans continued their appreciation in theater showings of "Once More, with Feeling" where attendees are encouraged to dress like the show's characters, sing along to the musical numbers, and otherwise interact in the style of The Rocky Horror Picture Show. Clinton McClung, a New York-based film programmer, got the idea for a sing-along from audience-participation showings of The Sound of Music in 2003. The next year, he began putting on sing-alongs to "Once More, with Feeling" in Boston's Coolidge Corner Theater, which became so popular that it went on the road. Audience members received props to use during key scenes, as well as directions (for example, to yell "Shut up, Dawn!" at Buffy's younger sister), and a live cast performed the episode alongside the screen.

Buffy sing-alongs received growing media attention as they spread. At the 2007 Los Angeles Film Festival, a special screening and sing-along was held that featured both Marti Noxon and Joss Whedon giving brief speeches to the audience. In October 2007, after a dispute with the Screen Actors Guild over unpaid residuals, 20th Century Fox pulled the licensing for public screenings of "Once More, with Feeling", effectively ending official Buffy sing-alongs. Whedon called the cancellation "hugely depressing" and attempted to influence the studio to allow future showings.

== See also ==
- Adam Shankman, choreographer for the episode
- "The Bitter Suite", the 1998 musical episode of Xena: Warrior Princess
- Dr. Horrible's Sing-Along Blog, 2008 miniseries
- "Dream On", 2010 Glee episode directed by Joss Whedon

== General and cited references ==
- Attinello, Paul; Halfyard, Janet; Knights, Vanessa (eds.) (2010). Music, Sound, and Silence in Buffy the Vampire Slayer, Ashgate Publishing, Ltd. ISBN 978-0-7546-6042-2
- Castañeda, Laura; Campbell, Shannon (2006). News and Sexuality: Media portraits of diversity, SAGE. ISBN 1-4129-0999-6
- Davidson, Joy (ed.) (2007). The Psychology of Joss Whedon: An Unauthorized Exploration of Buffy, Angel, and Firefly, Benbella Books. ISBN 978-1-933771-25-0
- Dial-Driver, Emily; Emmons-Featherston, Sally; Ford, Jim; Taylor, Carolyn Anne (eds.) (2008), The Truth of Buffy: Essays on Fiction Illuminating Reality, McFarland & Company, Inc., Publishers. ISBN 978-0-7864-3799-3
- Jowett, Lorna (2005). Sex and the Slayer: A Gender Studies Primer for the Buffy Fan, Wesleyan University Press. ISBN 978-0-8195-6758-1
- Kaveney, Roz (ed.) (2004). Reading the Vampire Slayer: The New, Updated, Unofficial Guide to Buffy and Angel, Tauris Parke Paperbacks. ISBN 1-4175-2192-9
- Mitchell, Claudia; Reid-Walsh, Jacqueline (2008). Girl Culture: Studying Girl Culture: A Readers' Guide, Volume 1, Greenwood Publishing Group. ISBN 0-313-33909-0.
- Newcomb, Horace (2004). Encyclopedia of Television, Museum of Broadcast Communications, ISBN 1-57958-394-6.
- Pateman, Matthew (2006). The Aesthetics of Culture in Buffy the Vampire Slayer, McFarland and Company. ISBN 0-7864-2249-1
- South, James (ed.) (2003). Buffy the Vampire Slayer and Philosophy: Fear and Trembling in Sunnydale, Open Court Books. ISBN 0-8126-9531-3
- Stafford, Nikki (2007). Bite Me! The Unofficial Guide to Buffy the Vampire Slayer, ECW Press. ISBN 978-1-55022-807-6
- Sweeney, Kathleen (2008). Maiden USA: Girl Icons come of Age, Volume 3, Peter Lang. ISBN 0-8204-8197-1
- Tropiano, Stephen (2002). Prime Time Closet: A History of Gays and Lesbians on TV, Applause Theater and Cinema Books. ISBN 1-55783-557-8
- Danuta Walters, Suzanna (2001), "All gay, all the time?", in Danuta Walters, Suzanna (ed.), All the rage: the story of gay visibility in America, Chicago: University of Chicago Press, p. 116, ISBN 9780226872322. Preview.
- Wilcox, Rhonda (2005). Why Buffy Matters: The Art of Buffy the Vampire Slayer, I. B. Tauris. ISBN 1-84511-029-3
- Yeffeth, Glenn (ed.) (2003). Seven Seasons of Buffy: Science Fiction and Fantasy Authors Discuss Their Favorite Television Show, Benbella Books. ISBN 1-932100-08-3
