= West Midlands Ambulance Service =

Ambulance trust in England

West Midlands Ambulance Service University NHS Foundation Trust
- WMAS UNHSFT

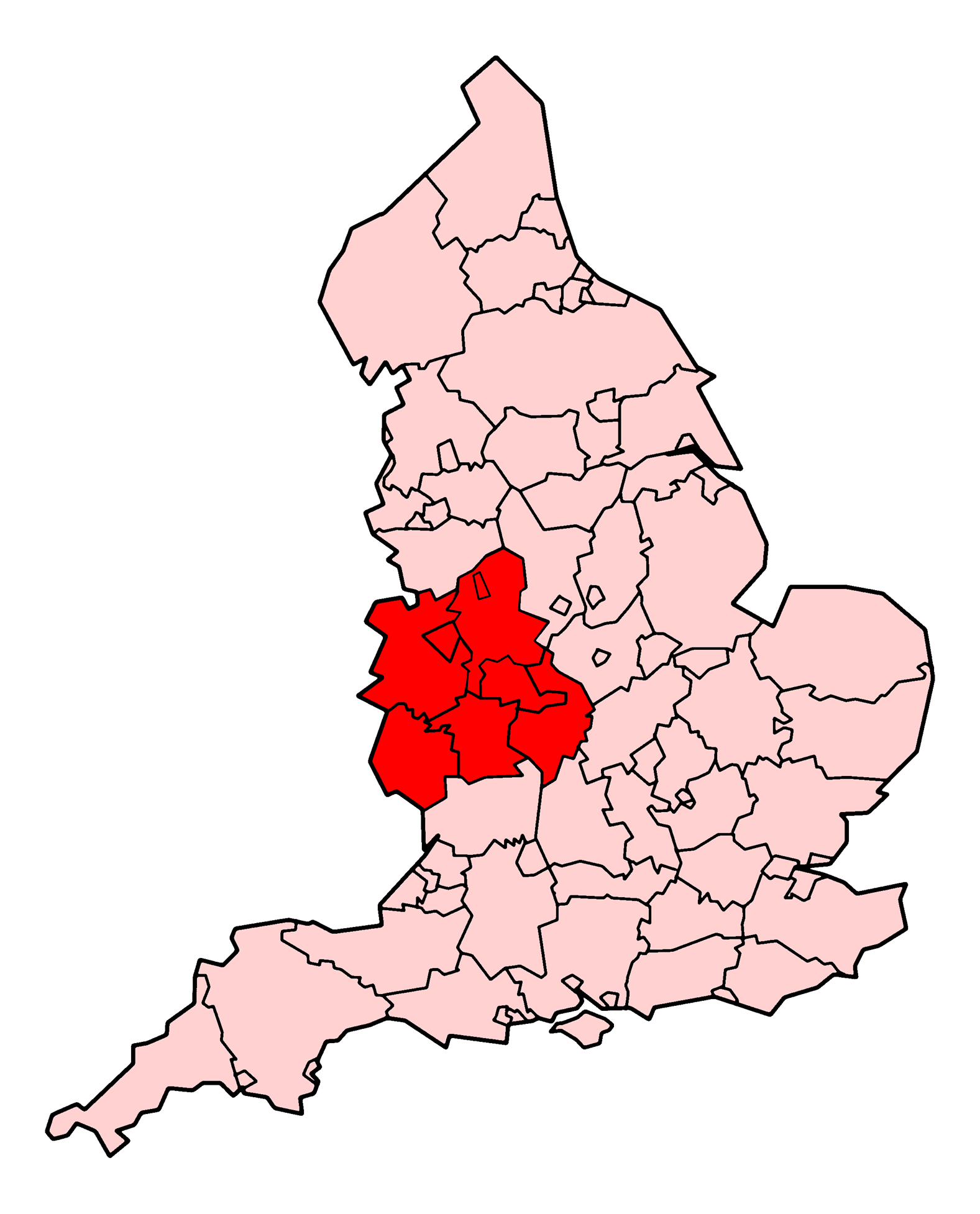
- Area served by West Midlands Ambulance Service University NHS Foundation Trust
- Type: University NHS foundation trust
- Established: 1 July 2006
- Headquarters: Brierley Hill
- Region served: West Midlands region, England
- Area size: 5,000 square miles (13,000 km^{2})
- Population: 5.6 million
- Budget: £280 million (2018/19)
- Chair: Professor Ian Cumming
- Chief executive: Professor Anthony C Marsh
- Staff: 5,000
- Website: wmas.nhs.uk

The West Midlands Ambulance Service University NHS Foundation Trust (WMAS UNHSFT) is responsible for providing NHS ambulance services within the West Midlands region of England. It is one of ten ambulance trusts providing England with emergency medical services, and is part of the National Health Service.

The West Midlands Ambulance Service University NHS Foundation Trust (WMAS UNHSFT) provides a 999 emergency medical response service for the counties of Herefordshire, Shropshire, Staffordshire, Warwickshire, Worcestershire, the seven boroughs of the West Midlands metropolitan county and combined authority area: Birmingham, Coventry, Dudley, Sandwell, Solihull, Walsall and Wolverhampton, and the unitary authorities of Stoke-on-Trent and Telford & Wrekin. The trust also provides non-emergency patient transport services in Birmingham, the Black Country, Arden, Cheshire and the Wirral. The contract for Worcestershire, which had been run by the ambulance service for 30 years, ended in March 2020 when it lost out to a private provider. In November 2019, the trust took over the running of the NHS 111 service in the West Midlands, except Staffordshire.

The trust is led by chief executive Professor Anthony Marsh and chair Professor Ian Cumming. It employs around 5,000 staff and is supported by a number of volunteers, including 750 community first responders. It has 15 ‘Make Ready’ ambulance hubs where emergency vehicles are prepared, maintained and cleaned by specialist staff ready for the clinical staff to use for treating patients. The trust now responds to over one million emergency calls every year.

WMAS is one of the highest-performing ambulance services in England and one of only two to exceed all of its national performance targets in 2018/19. Having previously been graded Outstanding by Care Quality Commission (CQC) inspectors in January 2017 and 2019, it was downgraded to Good in its most recent inspection. It is also the UK's first university-ambulance trust.

== History ==
The trust was formed on 1 July 2006, following the merger of the Hereford & Worcester Ambulance Service NHS Trust, Coventry & Warwickshire Ambulance NHS Trust, and WMAS and Shropshire services.

On 1 October 2007, the service merged with Staffordshire Ambulance Service NHS Trust.

It became an NHS foundation trust on 1 January 2013.

It was announced on 14 November 2018, that the West Midlands Ambulance Service NHS Foundation Trust had gone into partnership with the University of Wolverhampton to form the UK's first university-ambulance trust. It has since signed similar agreements with Staffordshire University, Coventry University, the University of Worcester and The University of Warwick. As a result, the trust has changed its name to West Midlands Ambulance Service University NHS Foundation Trust (WMAS UNHSFT).

In 2019, the trust lost the contract for patient transport in Worcestershire to a private firm, E-zec Medical Transport, which already operates the contract in Herefordshire. The trust said it lost out because it "refused to compromise on patient safety", and was not prepared to outbid the offer of E-Zec Medical Transport.

The trust had a contract to run NHS 111 across most of the West Midlands from 2019 but handed it back in 2022 as NHS England was pushing for NHS 111 contracts to cover larger geographical areas.

== Performance ==
In the 2017/18 contract negotiations with clinical commissioning groups (CCG), where Sandwell and West Birmingham CCG negotiated on behalf of all the West Midlands CCGs the trust sought financial compensation for the delays to ambulances caused by patient handover delays at local hospitals. WMAS wanted a "full second tariff" on top of the standard tariff for delays over 60 minutes, and "a smaller second tariff" for delays over 30 minutes, which would have come to around £6 million. After mediation by NHS England and NHS Improvement it was agreed to pay the trust an additional £2.1M in 2017/18. Worcestershire Acute Hospitals NHS Trust and Shrewsbury and Telford Hospital NHS Trust were singled out as the main culprits.

In 2017, it got an outstanding rating from the CQC. This was repeated in a 2019 CQC report.

In 2021, under the pressure arising from the COVID-19 pandemic in England it decided to stop sending ambulances for most category 3 and 4 calls in order to increase capacity to deal with more urgent calls. These callers will be diverted to other sources of help, such as community-based rapid intervention services, or attempts will be made to resolve the issue on the phone. In October 2021, the Trust board warned that it was causing “catastrophic” harm to patients due to handover delays, and the knock on effect of reaching patients too late. More than 15,000 hours were lost in October 2021 due to hospital handover delays over 30 minutes.

In June 2022 there were 98 patient harm incidents up from 49 in June 2021, mostly due to worsening hospital handover delays. Average response times for category one calls reached nearly nine minutes against the target of seven. For category two – which include suspected heart attacks and strokes – it increased to 99 minutes against the target of 18.

=== CQC performance rating ===
In its last inspection of the service in 2023, the Care Quality Commission (CQC) gave the following ratings on a scale of outstanding (the service is performing exceptionally well), good (the service is performing well and meeting our expectations), requires improvement (the service isn't performing as well as it should) and inadequate (the service is performing badly):

Inspection Reports
Area	Rating 2017	Rating 2019	Rating 2023
Are services Safe?	Good	Good	Good
Are services Effective?	Outstanding	Outstanding	Good
Are services Caring	Outstanding	Outstanding	Outstanding
Are services Responsive	Good	Outstanding	Good
Are services Well-led	Good	Outstanding	Good
Overall rating	Outstanding	Outstanding	Good

== Emergency operations centres ==
Following the merger of the trusts, WMAS inherited a number of standalone control rooms. This resulted in five centres spread across the region operating independently using varying levels of technology at sites: Millennium Point, Brierley Hill; Stone Road, Stafford; Abbey Foregate, Shrewsbury; Bransford, Worcester and Dale St, Leamington Spa. On 28 November 2007, the trust agreed to go ahead with proposals for the reconfiguration of its emergency operations centres (EOC). WMAS now operates two EOCs based at Millennium Point, Brierley Hill (Trust HQ) and Tollgate Drive, Stafford. They operate as a single virtual EOC so waiting calls at either of the trusts two EOCs can be answered by the other. This increases the speed at which vehicles can be dispatched.

== Resources ==
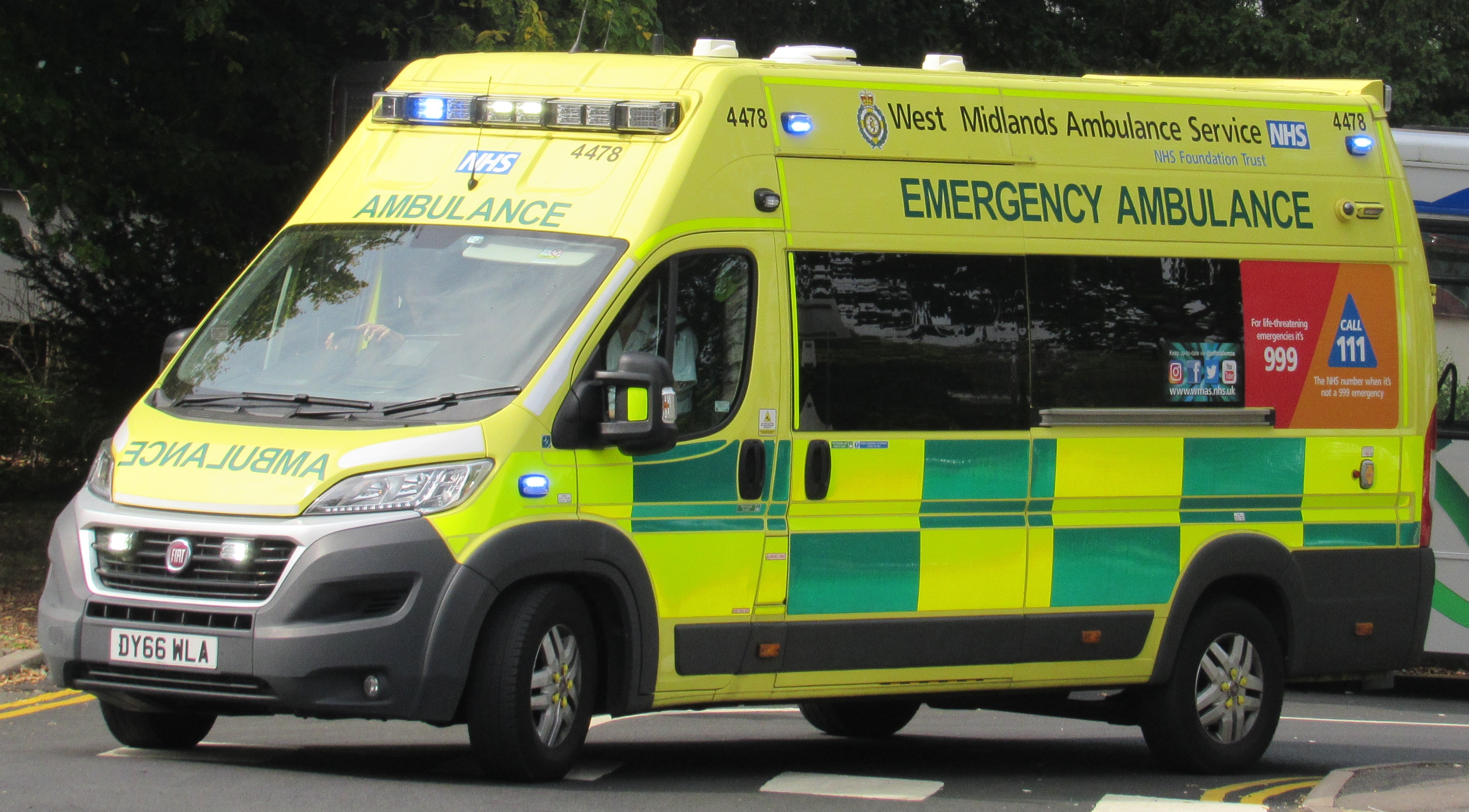
A West Midlands ambulance

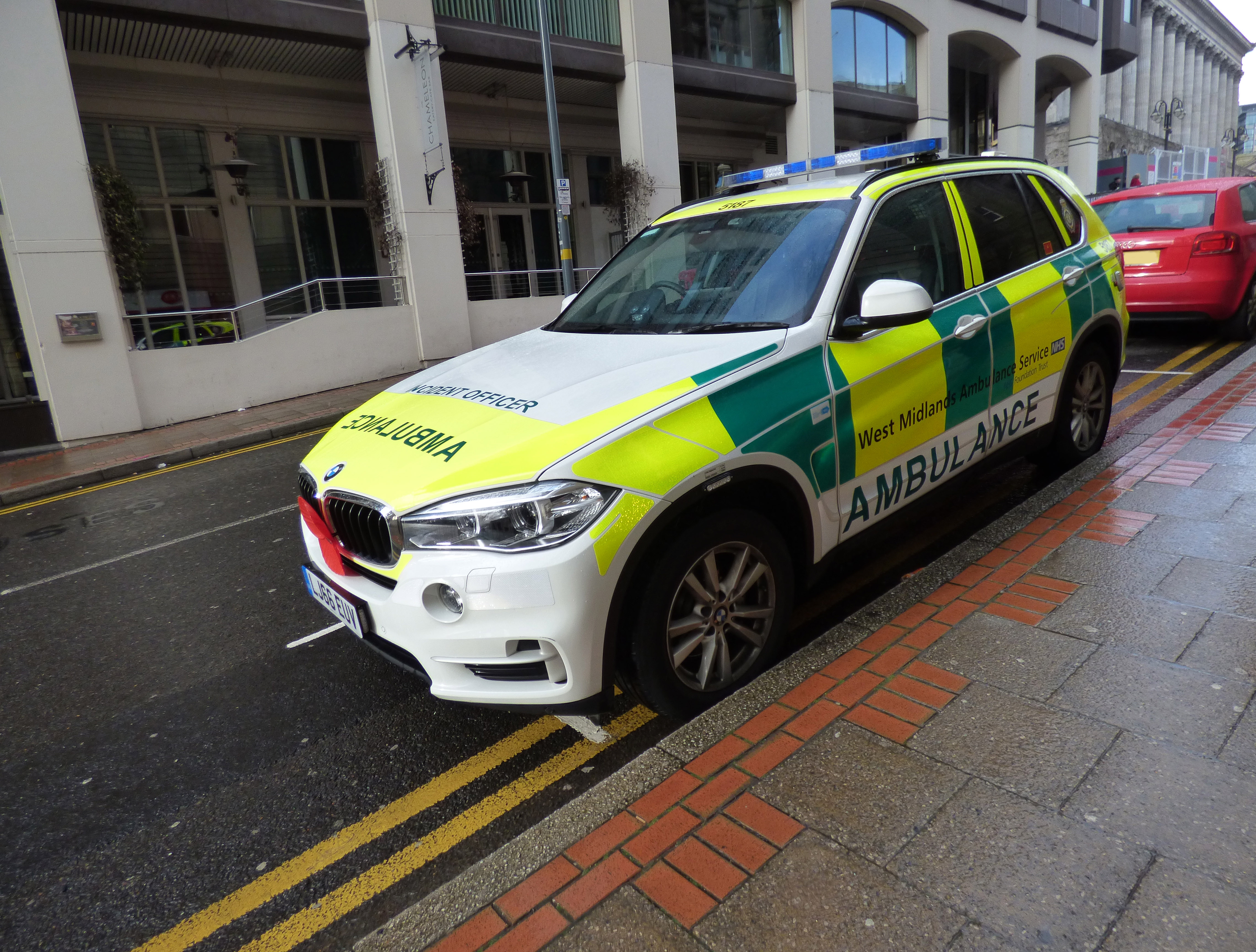
A rapid response vehicle in Birmingham

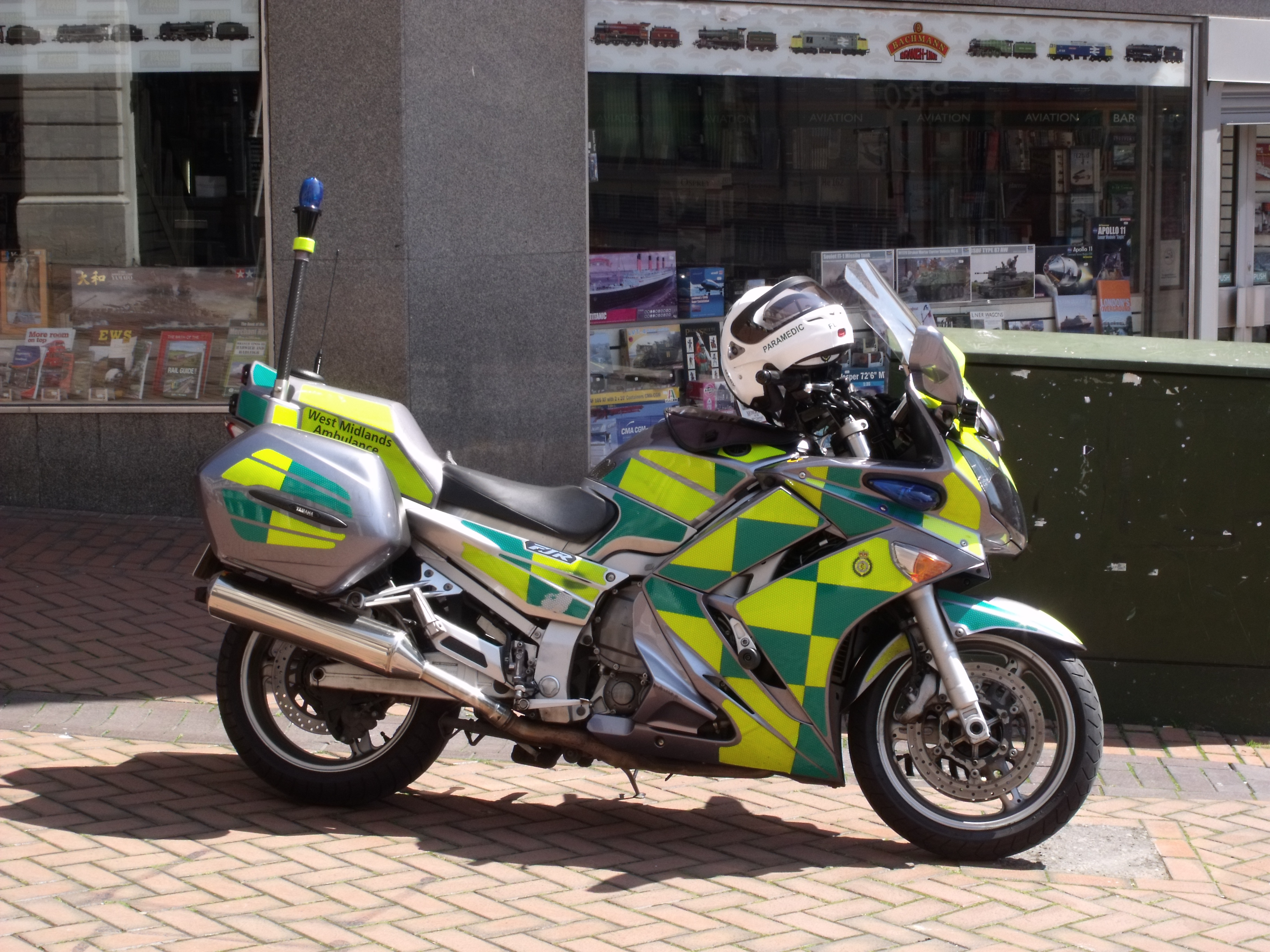
A rapid response motorcycle

As of 2019, the trust had over 450 emergency ambulances with a similar number of non-emergency patient transport service vehicles.

- 465 double-crewed emergency response ambulances (DCAs), of which 15 are 4x4 capable
- Rapid response vehicles (RRV), all 4x4 capable, used by paramedics
- Patient transport service vehicles - non emergency-capable vehicles without emergency equipment fitted used for transporting patients to/from/between medical treatment facilities and patients home addresses. There is also a fleet of ‘high dependency’ vehicles that carry basic medical equipment including a defibrillator, oxygen and a basic heart monitor
- 31 major incident vehicles, used to support large-scale incidents where multiple ambulances may be overwhelmed or there is the requirement for a co-ordinated response across emergency response services

In addition to the fleet, the service has several specialist teams available should the requirement arise:

- The Medical Emergency Response Intervention Team (MERIT) are a critical care paramedic and trauma doctor providing rapid response to emergencies in a RRV
- Hazardous Area Response Team (HART)
- WMAS can dispatch any of three charity-funded air ambulance helicopters from the Midlands Air Ambulance, carrying a specially trained doctor and critical care paramedic. WMAS also has access to both the Warwickshire & Northampton Air Ambulance and the Derbyshire, Leicestershire & Rutland Air Ambulance, both operated by The Air Ambulance Service
- West Midlands Ambulance Service are supported by several BASICS-affiliated charities, who provide volunteer doctors and nurses to support the regular ambulance service staff at more serious incidents
- On some evenings and all weekends, support for front-line crews is provided by the West Midlands CARE Team. The CARE Team is a volunteer group of BASICS doctors and nurses, conveyed in a specially equipped fast response car by a paramedic officer to provide advanced medical care at the scene of an incident
- In Herefordshire and Worcestershire, the Mercia Accident Rescue Service (MARS) is available to supplement and assist WMAS crews
- In times of severe weather, WMAS also has the ability to call on the Severn Area Rescue Association who have 4x4 ambulances
- WMAS can dispatch community first responders, who are volunteers working in partnership with WMAS, to medical emergencies in their local communities. These schemes are located all throughout the West Midlands, mostly located in rural areas where response times are longer

The trust does not use either voluntary aid societies such as St John Ambulance and British Red Cross or private ambulance.

== See also ==
- Emergency medical services in the United Kingdom
- Air ambulances in the United Kingdom
- West Mercia Police
- Staffordshire Police
- West Midlands Police
- Warwickshire Police
- Healthcare in Worcestershire
- List of NHS trusts
