= British Association for Immediate Care =

- Formation: 1977
- Type: Charitable organisation
- Headquarters: Ipswich
- Region served: United Kingdom
- Chairman: Andy Pountney
- Vice Chair: Paul Gates
- Chief Officer: Gary Morgan
- Website: www.basics.org.uk

The British Association for Immediate Care (BASICS) is an organisation which has the stated aim to encourage and aid the formation and extension of immediate care schemes. The British Association for Immediate Care was founded as a charity in 1977 and combines bringing people together who have an interest in pre-hospital immediate care with supporting and promoting regional and local immediate care schemes across the UK.

The organisation relies on volunteer medical professionals to provide healthcare assistance in support of the emergency services. It is registered as a charity.

== History ==
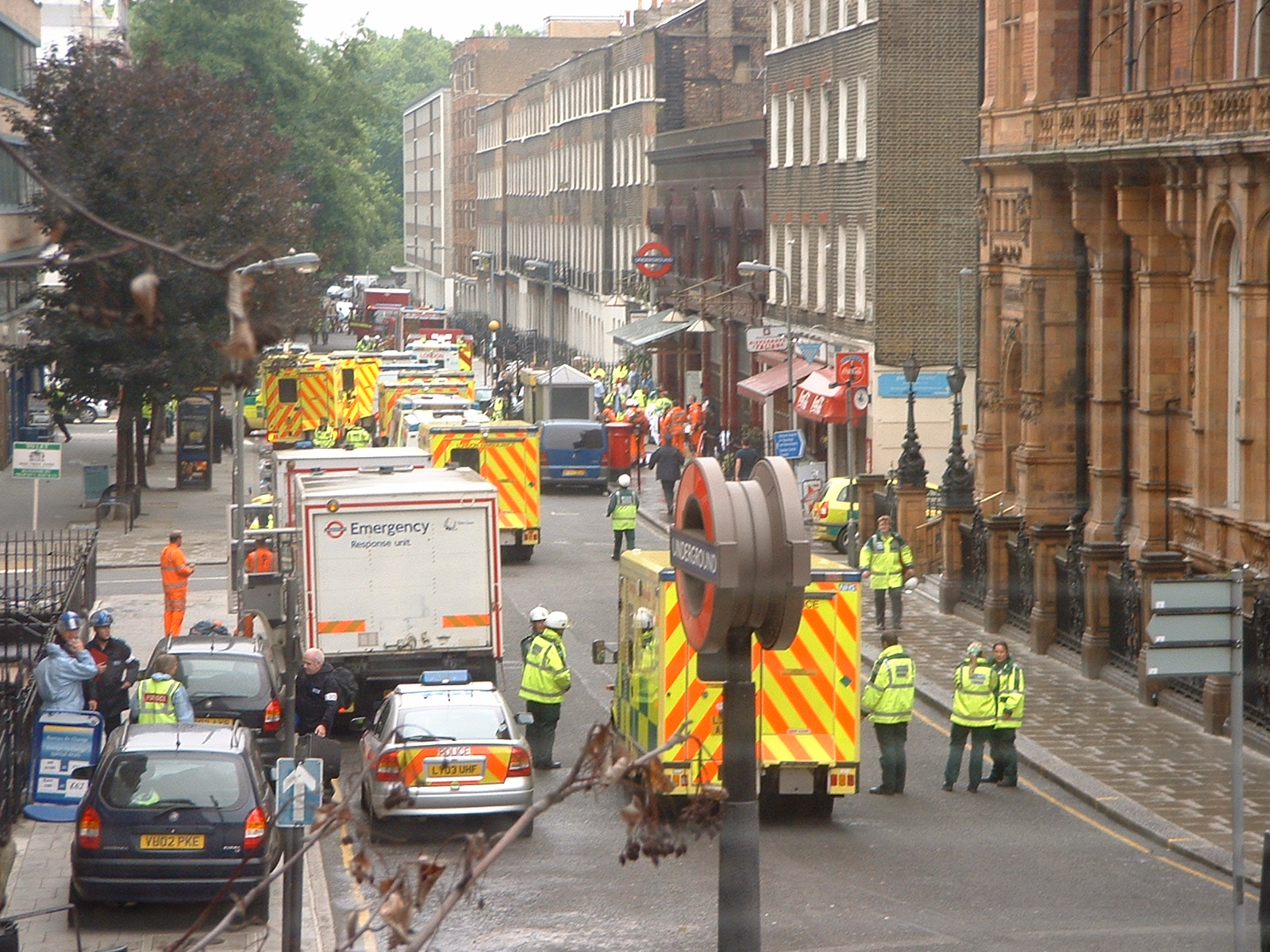
The 7/7 London Bombings.

The British Association of Immediate Care Schemes was established in June 1977. Kenneth Easton, a General Practitioner, was the first chairman of the organisation. Initially it was formed from the existing schemes. The organisation then offered individual membership to doctors that had an interest in immediate care, such as those working in General Practice, Surgery, Medicine, Emergency Medicine, Anaesthesia and Critical Care. Associate membership was open to paramedics and nurses which later again changed to offering full membership recognising the changing roles of these professions .

In 1991, the organisation increased their involvement in educational aspects, making available residential courses covering pre-hospital care and resuscitation. Around this time, it became clear that Scotland had different requirements to the rest of the UK, and BASICS Scotland was formed. In 1998, the organisation brought in a scheme for its members to have voluntary accreditation.

Further support for the work of BASICS during major incidents came after the 7 July 2005 London bombings. The following year the British Medical Association announced their support for a series of training courses, over three years, to be organised by BASICS.

== Purpose ==
BASICS is an association of health care professionals, who undertake additional training as immediate care practitioners. The members provide their services in support of the statutory or voluntary ambulance services.

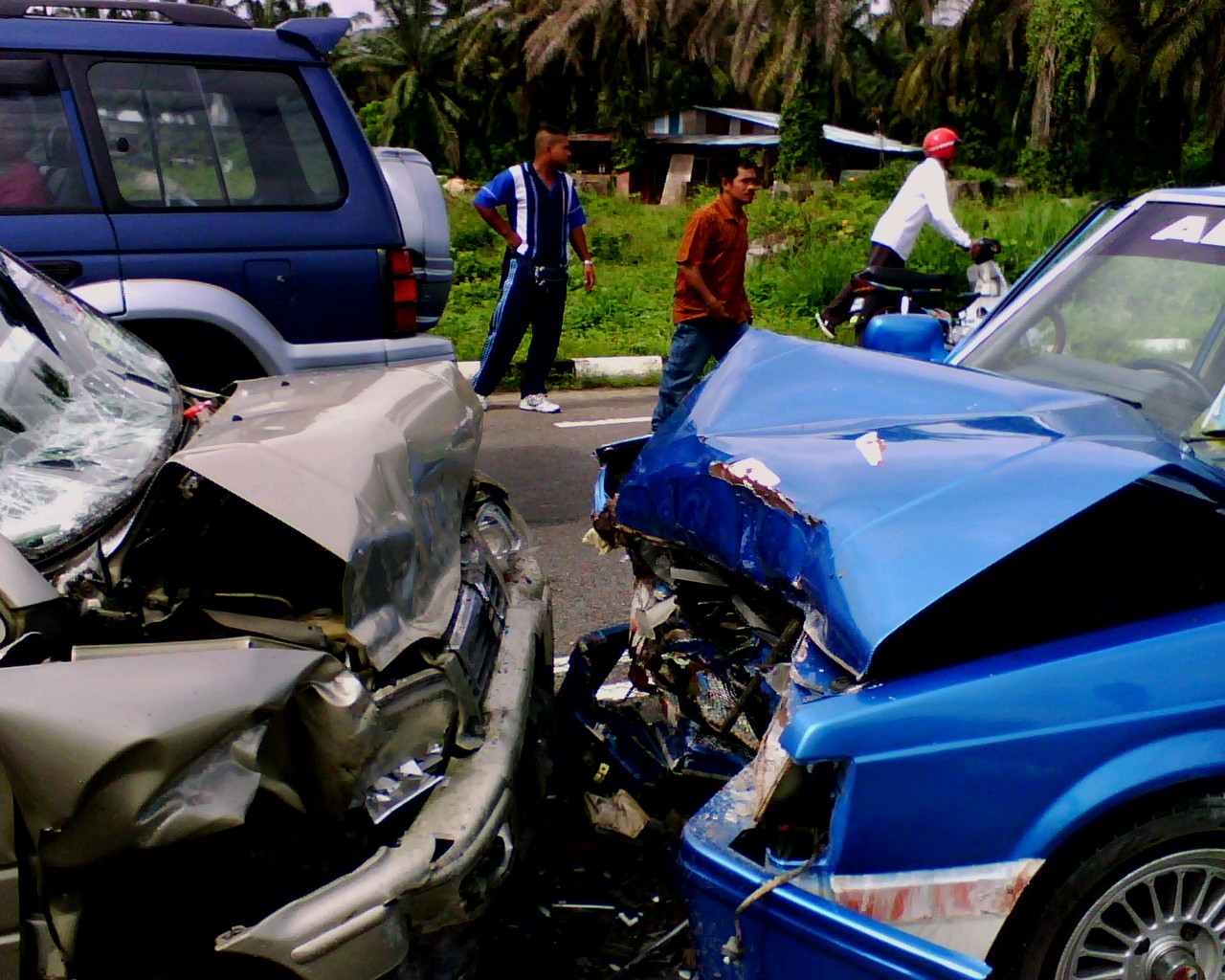
Road Traffic Collision.

BASICS members are used to provide extra skills at the scene of major incidents, or for particularly difficult patients. For this, individuals may be summoned on a case-by-case basis by the local ambulance control centre.

== Affiliated BASICS schemes ==
BASICS schemes across the country assist the ambulance service trusts where a multi-agency response is required at a local level, or additional skills and qualification levels are required. An example of this multi-agency response would be seen at an 'industrial accident' where for example a worker has become trapped in machinery. The ambulance service would work alongside the fire service to co-ordinate the rescue. Individual schemes can supplement the skill set available at scene with a medical doctor, nurse or critical care paramedics, who can provide skills outside the remit of most front-line paramedics. These supplementary skills include different methods of providing analgesia and, if necessary, surgical procedures which might be needed to extricate the patient. BASICS schemes may make use of all grades of first responder including doctors, critical care paramedics, paramedics and nurses alongside community first responders.

=== Local schemes ===
BASICS-affiliated schemes across the UK include:

- BASICS Cornwall
- BASICS Devon
- BASICS Dorset
- BASICS Essex Accident Rescue Service (BEARS)
- BASICS Gloucestershire
- Bravo Medics (Bristol and Avon)
- BASICS Northern Ireland (BASICS-NI)
- East Midlands Immediate Care Scheme
- Emergency Responders for Lancashire and Manchester (ER:LAM)
- Lincolnshire Integrated Voluntary Emergency Service
- Mercia Accident Rescue Service
- MEDSERVE Wales
- North East Immediate Care
- North Wales Emergency Doctors Service (NWEDS)
- South East Coast Immediate Care Scheme (SIMCAS)
- Suffolk Accident Rescue Service - SARS
- SWIFT Medics Wiltshire
- West Midlands CARE Team
- Yorkshire Ambulance Service BASICS
- West Yorkshire Medic Response Team

While BASICS has individual members in Scotland, BASICS Scotland takes a lead role in providing prehospital training and supporting responders in Scotland.

== Notable Individuals ==
Many of those who have worked or volunteered for BASICS have been awarded various awards or honours.

- Mr Tony Kemp, MBE MStJ. Past chairman and responder to the Shoreham Airshow disaster.
- Prof Tom Quinn, FRCN FESC. Emeritus Professor of Cardiovascular Nursing and Trustee of BASICS.
- Dr Priscilla Noble-Mathews (d.2017), a founder of SIMCAS, and Royal Humane Society award winner.
- Prof Sir Keith Porter: Honorary Officer: President

== 7/7 response 2005 ==
Following the 7 July 2005 London bombings, 17 doctors from HEMS London and BASICS London were deployed to the various attack sites to assist HEMS and London Ambulance Service paramedics. Gareth Davies was the Medical Incident Officer for the Aldgate site, with David Wise fulfilling this role at Paddington, Tim Harris and Julian Redhead at Tavistock Square.

== See also ==
- College of Paramedics
- Highland PICT Team
