= Mercia Accident Rescue Service =

- Abbreviation: MARS
- Formation: 17 July 1984
- Legal status: Active
- Purpose: The provision of immediate medical treatment to any person in need of such care, when requested to do so by a member of the emergency services
- Headquarters: Hereford
- Location: UK
- Region served: Herefordshire and Worcestershire
- Official language: English
- Chair of Trustees: Mark Worthing
- Affiliations: British Association of Immediate Care
- Budget: £72,774
- Staff: 7
- Volunteers: 16
- Website: www.marsbasics.org.uk

Mercia Accident Rescue Service (or MARS) is a BASICS affiliated charity operation based on providing a fast-response, advanced medical team to back up the emergency services of the English counties of Herefordshire and Worcestershire. The charity aims to provide an organisational framework within which practitioners can be properly trained and equipped to provide prehospital care, its work is supported by local fundraising. MARS is staffed by a team of 11 doctors and two advanced clinical practitioners.

MARS responders assist at serious incidents such as road traffic collisions, industrial accidents, drownings, assaults, and critically unwell medical patients.

== Equipment Carried ==
The typical equipment carried by a MARS responder includes:

- Basic, intermediate and advanced airway: OP, NP, iGel, endotracheal tubes, Surgical cricothyroidotomy kits.
- Ventilatory support with ETCO_{2} monitoring: Bag-Valve-Mask, pressure control, portable ventilator.
- Circulation control: IV access, EZ-IO (intraosseus access)
- Control of bleeding: Torniquets and haemostatic agents, nasal haemostats and dental blocks.
- Surgical equipment to perform; thoracostomy, thoracotomy, amputation
- Diagnostic equipment to measure: BP, ETCO2, SpO2, Blood sugar, point of care ultrasound machine
- A range of medications to provide sedation and analgesia

== Notable Individuals ==
- Prof Gavin Perkins - Consultant in Critical Care Medicine / Clinical Academic
- Mr Richard Steyn - Past chairman of BASICS / Consultant Thoracic Surgeon / Honorary Associate Professor
- Dr Malcolm Russell MBE
- Mr Andrew Thurgood - First Consultant Nurse in prehospital emergency medicine in the UK

== See also ==
- West Midlands Ambulance Service
- Midlands Air Ambulance
- West Midlands CARE Team
- MARS Twitter
