= Lincolnshire Fire and Rescue Service =

Fire and rescue service of England

Operational area
- Country: England
- County: Lincolnshire

Agency overview
- Established: 1974
- Annual calls: 10,004 (2019-20)
- Employees: 688 (2019-20)
- Annual budget: £21.9 million (2020-21)
- Chief Fire Officer: Mark Baxter

Facilities and equipment
- Divisions: 3
- Stations: 38
- Engines: 48
- Platforms: 2
- USAR: Yes
- Rescue boats: 10

Website
- www.lincolnshire.gov.uk/lincolnshire-fire-rescue

Lincolnshire Fire and Rescue (LFR) is the statutory fire and rescue service serving the non-metropolitan county of Lincolnshire in the East Midlands Region of England. This does not include North Lincolnshire and North East Lincolnshire, which are covered by Humberside Fire and Rescue Service.

The area covered is large, covering 5,921 km^{2} (2,286 square miles), and mainly rural, with LFR coming under the authority of Lincolnshire County Council. Lincoln is the only city within the area, as well as large towns such as Grantham, Boston, Skegness, Spalding and Gainsborough. The rest of the area's 751,000 inhabitants are spread over other medium-sized towns and villages.

East Coast Flooding is one of the main risks to the area, seen in the 2013 east coast tidal surge, where the town of Boston and surrounding areas of southern Lincolnshire and Norfolk were affected.

== Overview ==
The service employs 688 firefighters and staff, with around 250 full-time firefighters. The county's 38 fire stations are allocated to one of three divisions (East, West and South). The majority of Lincolnshire is covered by retained duty staff (RDS), who attend on a call-out basis. The retained staff are supported by full-time firefighters (wholetime) based at nine different stations around the county. They also offer specialist skills and equipment, such as rope/high-line rescue, water rescue, animal rescues etc. Lincolnshire firefighters have supported rescue efforts nationally, such as in the floods of 2007 and most recently the Berkshire flooding in 2014 and Cumbria/North Yorkshire floods of 2015. The headquarters are now part of a joint Police and Fire HQ based at the Lincolnshire Police Headquarters in Nettleham, just outside of Lincoln. The county boasts its Waddington Training Facility located to the south of the city using a former part of the RAF Waddington site, allowing realistic training environments used by many other fire services and organisations.

The county also has a tri-service emergency hub accommodating personnel and vehicles of Lincolnshire Fire & Rescue Service, East Midlands Ambulance Service and Lincolnshire Police service in a purpose-built £21 million building on South Park Avenue in Lincoln.

== History ==
Prior to 1974, when Lincolnshire was administratively three separate counties, there were three fire brigades for the geographic county, covering Kesteven, Holland and Lindsey, with Lindsey being the biggest, which formed in 1948. Grimsby had its own Grimsby Borough Fire Brigade. After 1974, much of the Lindsey Fire Brigade with Grimsby became part of Humberside Fire and Rescue Service, and still is today. Prior to 1974, this would have covered two large oil refineries at Immingham and other large fire risks - indeed the Flixborough disaster in June 1974, the largest civilian explosion in the UK, took place soon after the separation of counties in the new Humberside area, although the Lincolnshire Fire Service, in nearby Gainsborough, would have been called for assistance.

== Performance ==
Every fire and rescue service in England and Wales is periodically subjected to a statutory inspection by His Majesty's Inspectorate of Constabulary and Fire & Rescue Services (HMICFRS). The inspections investigate how well the service performs in each of three areas. On a scale of outstanding, good, requires improvement and inadequate, Lincolnshire Fire and Rescue Service was rated as follows:

HMICFRS Inspection Lincolnshire
Area	Rating 2018/19	Rating 2021/22	Description
Effectiveness	Good	Requires improvement	How effective is the fire and rescue service at keeping people safe and secure from fire and other risks?
Efficiency	Good	Requires improvement	How efficient is the fire and rescue service at keeping people safe and secure from fire and other risks?
People	Requires improvement	Requires improvement	How well does the fire and rescue service look after its people?

== Fire stations and appliances ==
Lincolnshire Fire and Rescue has 38 fire stations:

- Nine wholetime duty system stations crewed by full-time firefighters either on a 24/7 shift system or 'Lincs Crewing System'
- 29 retained duty system stations crewed by on-call firefighters.

Lincoln South fire station is the county's only wholetime station that works the 24/7 shift system. This station has four watches (Red, Blue, Green and White) that work two day shifts followed by two night shifts, and then have four rest days.

The other eight wholetime stations around the county now work the 'Lincolnshire Crewing System'. Each station has ten wholetime personnel which work their shifts so they are generally on duty for four days then with four rest days. The days they are on duty they provide wholetime night cover from purpose built living accommodation that is in close proximity to the station. Therefore, the first appliance is always crewed by wholetime personnel.

Each wholetime station in Lincolnshire also has an on-call attachment that crew the second appliances and support the wholetime crew.

The service operates the following fire appliances:

- 48 fire engines
- 2 aerial ladder platforms
- 4 special appliances
- 10 swift water rescue boats
- 2 high capacity pumps
- 1 high volume pump

== Co-responder / joint ambulance conveyance project ==
Lincolnshire Fire and Rescue Service works in partnership with the East Midlands Ambulance Service (EMAS) to provide emergency medical cover to select areas of Lincolnshire. The aim of a fire service co-responder team is to preserve life until the arrival of either an ambulance service rapid response vehicle (RRV) or an ambulance. As of 2018, 10 of the service's 38 fire stations operated provided co-responders. Co-responder firefighters in Lincolnshire are trained by, and operate as members of the Lincolnshire Integrated Voluntary Emergency Service whilst on-call as a co-responder. However, co-responder firefighters are still dispatched and maintain communication with the fire and rescue control room in Nettleham.

Lincolnshire Fire and Rescue are the first Fire and Rescue Service in the United Kingdom to operate actual 'Fire Ambulances'. Three ambulances were trialed at Stamford, Woodhall Spa and Long Sutton fire stations. They were used to transport the patient to hospital care, assisting EMAS with freeing up ambulance crews and allowing the patient to reach hospital care sooner than waiting for EMAS transport.

Co-responder vehicles and ambulances are equipped with equipment based from the co-responder's responder level.

== See also ==
- List of British firefighters killed in the line of duty
