= Richard Harper-Smith =

John Richard Harper-Smith MBE
- Died: 12 April 2019 (aged 88)
- Occupations: Army Doctor; Ship's Doctor; General Practitioner
- Known for: Lincolnshire Integrated Voluntary Emergency Service
- Medical career
- Profession: General Practitioner

John Richard Harper-Smith was a medical doctor in Tetford, Lincolnshire. He was most well known for being one of two founding doctors behind the Lincolnshire Integrated Voluntary Emergency Service (LIVES).

== Order of the British Empire ==
In the 2008 Birthday Honours, Harper-Smith was awarded Membership to the Order of the British Empire, for his voluntary work with LIVES.
