= Ken Easton =

British medical doctor (1924–2001)

Kenneth Charles Easton FRCGP OBE OStJ (1924 – 8 February 2001) was a British doctor who worked as a general practitioner in Catterick, North Yorkshire, United Kingdom. He is known for his work in organising immediate care schemes, increasing the provision of specialist medical help at the scene of accidents.

== Education ==
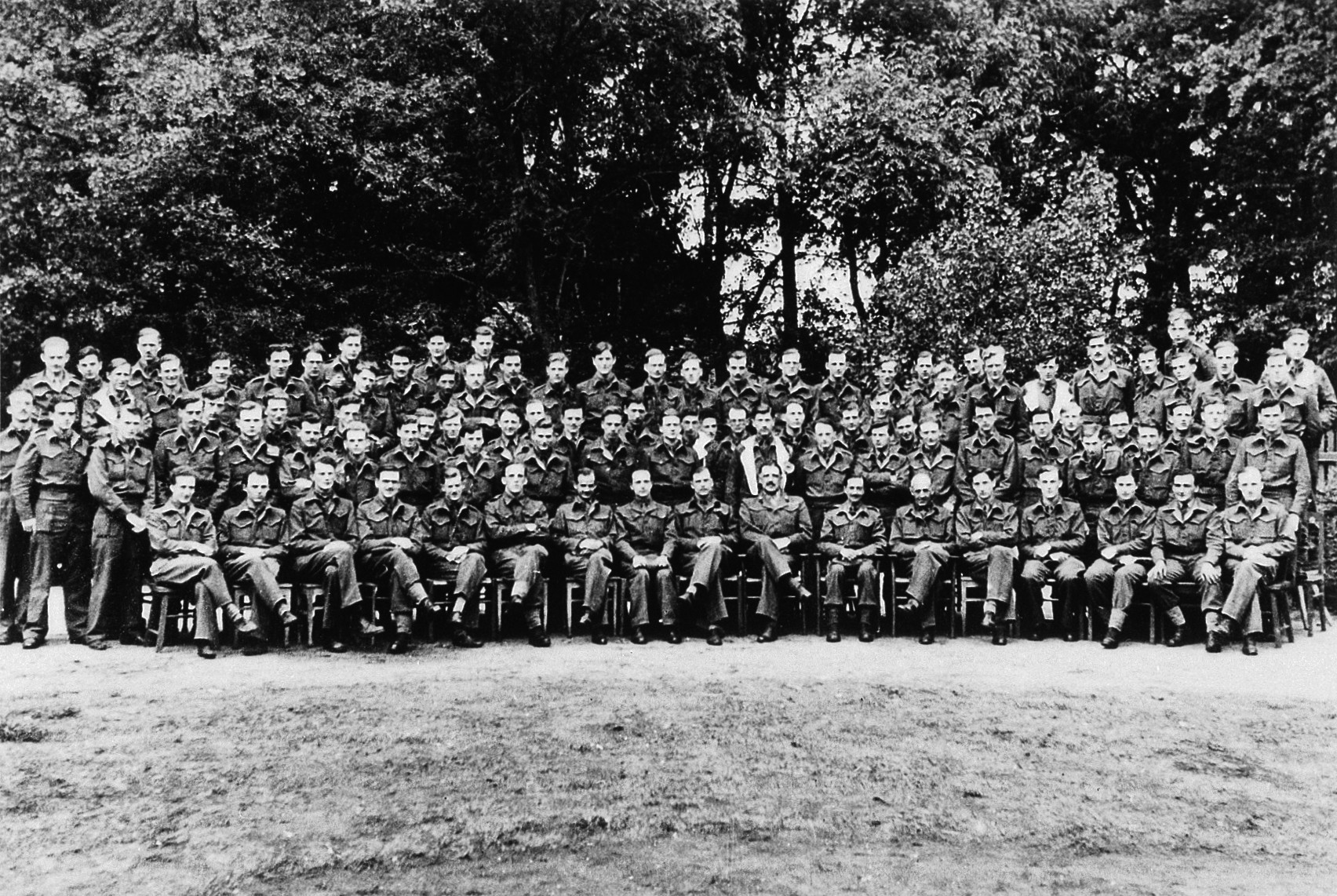
Group photo of London Medical students who went to Belsen

Easton studied at the Westminster Hospital Medical School. While studying medicine there in 1945, he assisted at Bergen-Belsen concentration camp as a voluntary medical student. His career later was focussed around the development of prehospital care and emergency medicine.

== Career ==
In 1967, Easton set up a Road Accident After Care Scheme (RAACS) in North Riding, Yorkshire.

By its first anniversary, the scheme's doctors had attended 173 accidents, in which 175 people were seriously injured – but not one died en route to hospital. Easton published recommendations for the emergency treatment of road accidents. This was an important innovation that helped provide a model for immediate care schemes that subsequently emerged in the United Kingdom.

Easton was a key figure in establishing the British Association of Immediate Care Schemes in June 1977. He was the first chairman of the organisation.

== Personal life ==
On 8 February 2001, Easton died.

== Awards and honours ==
Easton was made a member of the Order of Saint John in June 1970.

In 1972, the President of the Royal College of General Practitioners (RCGP) presented him with a Foundation Council award, which is given for special meritorious work in connection with the College.

In the 1974 New Year Honours, he was made an Officer of the Order of the British Empire (OBE).
