= Lincolnshire Integrated Voluntary Emergency Service =

- Formation: 1970
- Type: Ambulance service; Charitable organisation; Limited company
- Headquarters: Units 5-8 Birch Court, Horncastle, LN9 6SB
- Region served: Lincolnshire (As emergency responders); Nationwide (England) (Education)
- Chief Executive: Nikki Cooke
- Clinical Director: Dr. Simon Topham
- Head of Fundraising & Communications: Gemma Shaw
- Head of Sales: Kirsty Raywood
- Affiliations: East Midlands Ambulance Service; British Association for Immediate Care
- Income: £1.4 per annum
- Staff: 27 including trustees
- Volunteers: 762 Community First Responders; 61 Medical First Responders
- Website: www.lives.org.uk

Lincolnshire Integrated Voluntary Emergency Service, known commonly as LIVES, is a registered charity staffed by volunteers providing pre-hospital care services across Lincolnshire, England. LIVES operates alongside the East Midlands Ambulance Service to provide clinical and critical care skills as well as immediate medical responses in the form of community first responders. LIVES operates under the national pre-hospital care co-ordinating body, the British Association for Immediate Care. LIVES is a registered provider of healthcare with the Care Quality Commission.

== History ==
During the 1970s two doctors in Lincolnshire, Dr Michael Cooper from Nettleham and Dr Richard Harper-Smith of Tetford, devised the LIVES concept. An open meeting was convened, attended by over one hundred local doctors enthused by the idea of the service. The original objective of the scheme was to provide expert emergency medical assistance for road traffic accident victims and other trauma cases throughout Lincolnshire. Originally LIVES had no funds and joining doctors bought their own equipment. In the following years several companies and institutes gave money which was spent on establishing a radio-communication system to improve the efficiency of call-out. A mixture of telephones and two way radios were introduced with transmitters at Nettleham and Fulletby.

In 1974 Dr Mike Cooper became ill and resigned from the Chair whilst Dr Richard Harper-Smith took over, the position confirmed at the 1975 annual general meeting. Dr Mike Cooper died in 1976.

In 1980 further transmitters were installed at Barton, Boston and Sleaford employing 3 part-time operators. Communications remained limited and additional transmitters were provided by charitable contribution to a total of seven. Each transmitter was then connected to the control room at the Lincoln County Hospital by landline. These alone cost £10,000 a year in rental.

During the 1990s Lincoln County Hospital declared that as a result of a modernisation programme it was not possible to continue letting LIVES have a room at the accident and emergency department. An invitation from the Lincolnshire Ambulance Service to base LIVES Control within the ambulance control centre was accepted and LIVES control was moved to the ambulance headquarters at Bracebridge Heath. This move greatly improved the efficiency of LIVES call-out and still operates to this day as part of the computerised automatic dispatch (CAD) system.

In 1999 the Chief Executive of the Ambulance Trust invited LIVES to establish a community first responder service for suspected victims of cardiac arrest. It was envisaged that this would enable an equality of service to be extended across the rural areas within the county. LIVES saw this as an extension of their existing service and readily agreed to participate. This then became the LIVES "First Responder Scheme".

== Current ==
LIVES headquarters is situated within a dedicated office unit at Birch Court, in Horncastle, Lincolnshire. Governance, training, equipment and support is provided to First Responder Districts from Head Office. In addition the head office also provide Training packages and Event medical support .

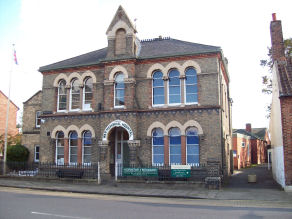
The old LIVES headquarters at the War Memorial Centre

LIVES responders attend over 1,000 incidents a month, totalling in the region of 12,000 incidents per year.

== Volunteers ==
Doctors

LIVES volunteer doctors are tasked to respond to the most serious of incidents throughout the county. LIVES doctors bring specific critical care skills to the pre-hospital environment, enhancing current roadside care. LIVES doctors employ specialist airway management as well as surgical skills. They are also able to utilise specialist drugs and resuscitation techniques. These doctors come from a variety of backgrounds but are typically from General Practice or specialties aligned with critical care medicine. Current LIVES doctors hold (whilst new recruits are encouraged to work towards) the Diploma in Immediate Medical Care.

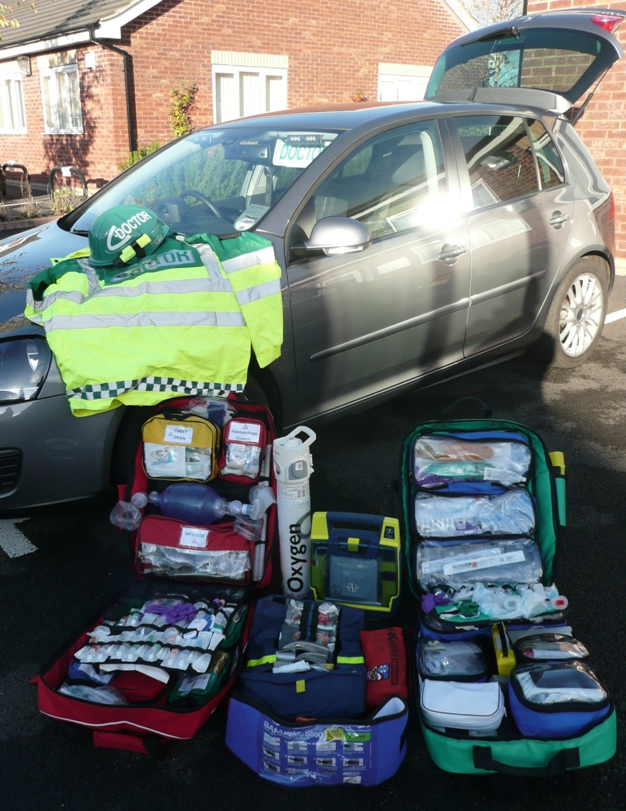
Typical of the medical equipment carried by LIVES doctors, 2010

Registered Paramedics

LIVES paramedics are drawn from operational front line positions throughout the ambulance service and volunteer in their spare time. They are typically activated to provide a response within their home locality to incidents specifically requiring paramedic skills. Some Paramedics now carry extended skills including sedation, advanced analgesia and surgical interventions such as Finger thoracostomies and Advanced airway management including surgical airways.

Registered Nurses

As well as holding specialist critical care and advanced life support skills in their own environments, LIVES nurses are expected to hold the Prehospital Emergency Care (PhEC) Certificate from the British Association for Immediate Care.

First responders

Form a large proportion of the immediate emergency response. First responders undertake accredited courses at the LIVES headquarters before going operational. Once operational and on duty they can be activated to incidents by ambulance control within a defined area, providing valuable emergency cover in otherwise hard to reach areas. There are currently three levels of trained first responder:

- Level 2 Utilising basic life support skills with airway adjuncts, oxygen use and fully automated defibrillators.
- Level 3 Further training in paediatric care. Activated to a wider scope of incidents.
- Level 4 Specific on-scene safety training. Use of nitrous oxide and other medications for prehospital immediate care.

== Operational impact ==
The 2004 School of Health and Related Research at the University of Sheffield published a report investigating the utility of the service:

- LIVES activity is increasing over time as the number of schemes also continues to increase. Up to 25% of ambulance service category A calls now receive a LIVES response and for 80% of these calls the LIVES response arrives first on scene
- LIVES improves response time performance by 35% in the rural areas where they provide a service thus contributing to the provision of an equitable service for life-threatening category A calls
- The return to spontaneous circulation rate of patients in cardiac arrest is 20% for cases attended by LIVES and receiving defibrillation. Response times to these cases are considerably shorter than the first ambulance service response
- Users of the ambulance service who receive a LIVES response show a high level of satisfaction with the LIVES service

The NHS Improvement network recognises the significant contributions made by LIVES volunteers:

"This has been an innovative way of using locally available resources, at minimal cost, to improve patient outcomes for life threatening conditions in an environment where continued annual increases in demand for emergency ambulance services produce further pressure on already stretched resources"

A 2011 independent review by the University of Sheffield speaks highly of the service:

== LIVES training ==
LIVES training is the external training arm of the LIVES charity. LIVES training offers a number of first aid and pre-hospital care courses. LIVES training is both Health and Safety Executive Approved (58/03) and IHCD (5231) registered.

== Educational Commitment ==
LIVES personnel have a strong educational commitment and ethos. In addition to regular meetings and sessions, LIVES personnel are involved in multiple educational activities, including the promotion of pre-hospital care amongst medical and nursing students. LIVES doctors and nurses have delivered lectures and presentations to local universities and at national conferences.

Two LIVES personnel hold instructor status with British Association for Immediate Care (BASICS) and teach on nationally recognised and accredited BASICS courses.
