= Anthony Kemp (historian) =

- Born: 1939; London, United Kingdom
- Died: 29 January 2018 (aged 78); Macclesfield, United Kingdom
- Education: Brighton College
- Occupation: Military historian

Anthony Kemp (1939 – 29 January 2018) was an English writer, journalist and military historian specialising in the history of World War II.

== Biography ==
Anthony Kemp was born in London in 1939, he had a clear memory of the preparations for D-Day in the Hampshire village where he lived as a child. Educated at Brighton College, after service in the Royal Air Force, he spent several years in Germany before returning to study modern history at Pembroke College, Oxford. After a short period as a university lecturer, Kemp worked for twelve years as researcher, producer, and director of documentary programmes for British television, notably Television South.

He was associated with a number of award-winning documentary productions on the Second World War, including Nan Red, the story of D-Day at Saint-Aubin-sur-Mer, Calvados. He was author of numerous books on various aspects of military and contemporary history and was a contributor to several academic journals. He lived in France in the early 1990s, where he was a writer and freelance television director. He published seven books at Éditions Gallimard, including four works in the collection "Découvertes Gallimard".

He had a keen interest in the commanders of World War II, he authored Men-at-Arms 120: Allied Commanders of World War II and Men-at-Arms 124: German Commanders of World War II, published at Osprey Publishing. In addition to works on military history, Kemp also wrote Witchcraft and Paganism Today back in 1995, and was co-author of Practical Paganism in 1996.

== Bibliography ==
- Weapons & Equipment of the Marlborough Wars, Blandford Press, 1980
- The Unknown Battle: Metz, 1944, Stein and Day, 1981
- Men-at-Arms 120: Allied Commanders of World War II, Osprey Publishing, 1982
- Men-at-Arms 124: German Commanders of World War II, Osprey Publishing, 1982
- Springboard for Overlord: Hampshire and the D-Day Landings , Milestone Publications, 1984
- The Secret Hunters, Michael O’Mara Books, 1986
- Escape from Berlin, BOXTREE, 1987
- The Maginot Line: Myth & Reality, Military Heritage Press, 1988
- Southampton at War, 1939–45, Ensign Publications, 1989
- The SAS at War, 1941–1945, John Murray Pubs Ltd, 1992
- The SAS: Savage Wars of Peace, 1947 to the Present, John Murray Pubs Ltd, 1994
- D-Day: The Normandy Landings and the Liberation of Europe, ‘New Horizons’ series. Thames & Hudson, 1994
  - D-Day and the Invasion of Normandy, "Abrams Discoveries" series. Harry N. Abrams, 1994
  - 6 juin 1944 : Le débarquement en Normandie, collection "Découvertes Gallimard" (nº 202), série Histoire. Éditions Gallimard, 1994
- Co-author with Patrice Gélinet, 6 juin 1944 : Le débarquement en Normandie – Les Français du 6 juin, collection "Découvertes Gallimard (Livre-CD)". Éditions Gallimard, 1994 (CD+Book special edition for fiftieth anniversary of D-Day)
- D-Day: The Normandy Landings and the Liberation of Europe, collection "Découvertes Gallimard Albums". Éditions Gallimard, 1994
- 1939–1945 : Le monde en guerre, collection "Découvertes Gallimard" (nº 244), série Histoire. Éditions Gallimard, 1995
- Witchcraft and Paganism Today, Brockhampton Press, 1995
- Co-author with J.M. Sertori, Practical Paganism, Robert Hale, 1996
- Metz 1944: One More River (English-French Bilingual Edition), Heimdal, 2006

Translation

- AA.VV., Battle of Normandy: The D-Day Landings and the Battle of Normandy, collection « Encyclopédies thématiques du voyage ». Éditions Gallimard, 2004
