= West Midlands CARE Team =

- West Midlands Central Accident Resuscitation and Emergency Team
- Founded: 1990
- Type: Medical charity
- Location: Birmingham, England, UK
- Key people: Prof Sir Keith Porter, President; Mr Richard Steyn, Chairman; Dr Matthew Boylan
- Affiliations: BASICS
- Website: www.wmcareteam.com

The West Midlands Central Accident, Resuscitation & Emergency (CARE) team is a charitable organisation who respond to serious medical incidents within the West Midlands, UK. Working in teams alongside West Midlands Ambulance Service, volunteer doctors, nurses and other healthcare professionals deliver enhanced critical care to seriously injured and unwell patients.

The charitable aims of the organisation are the relief of persons suffering injury or illness by the provision of immediate medical care and advancing the study of immediate medical care by the provision of training and research.

== Background and history ==
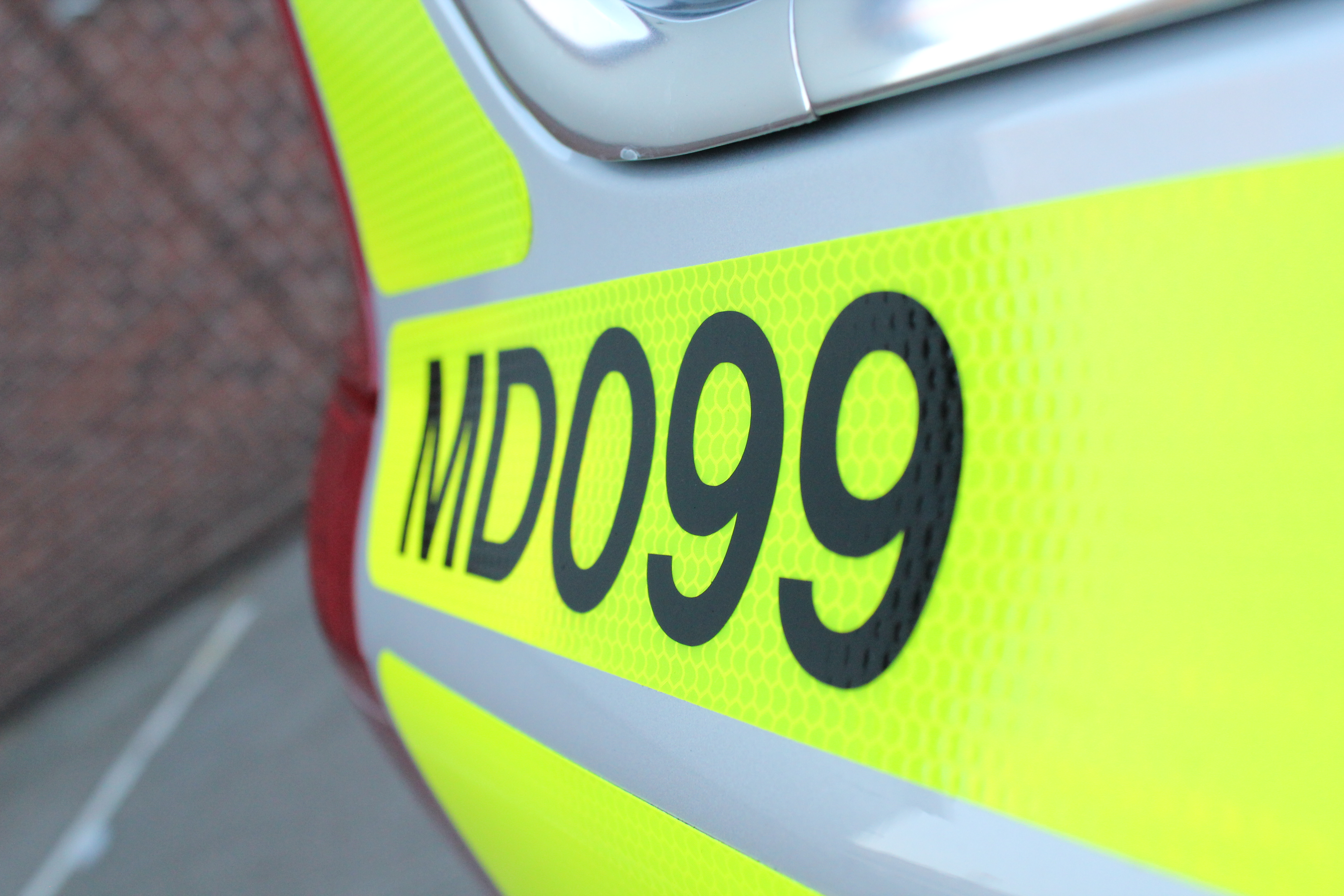
The team's callsign on its vehicle: Mike Delta 99

Founded in the late 1980s, around the time of the national ambulance strikes, the organisation evolved from a 'flying squad' originally based at the now-closed Birmingham Accident Hospital and gradually developed into the organisation seen today. One of the founding members was Prof Sir Keith Porter - the first professor of clinical traumatology in the UK.

The CARE Team is an affiliated scheme of the British Association for Immediate Care (BASICS) and responds on behalf of West Midlands Ambulance Service using the callsign MD099.

== Team structure ==
Each team responding on behalf of the West Midlands CARE Team consists of three to four personnel, all of whom are volunteers. Most personnel work in NHS hospitals in their day-to-day professional life, volunteering spare time to respond with the charity. The organisation's approach focusses on collaborative working with the doctors, nurses and paramedics all coming together as a team. They usually wear distinctive protective clothing with red shoulders, and a fluorescent yellow body and green legs with reflective stripes.

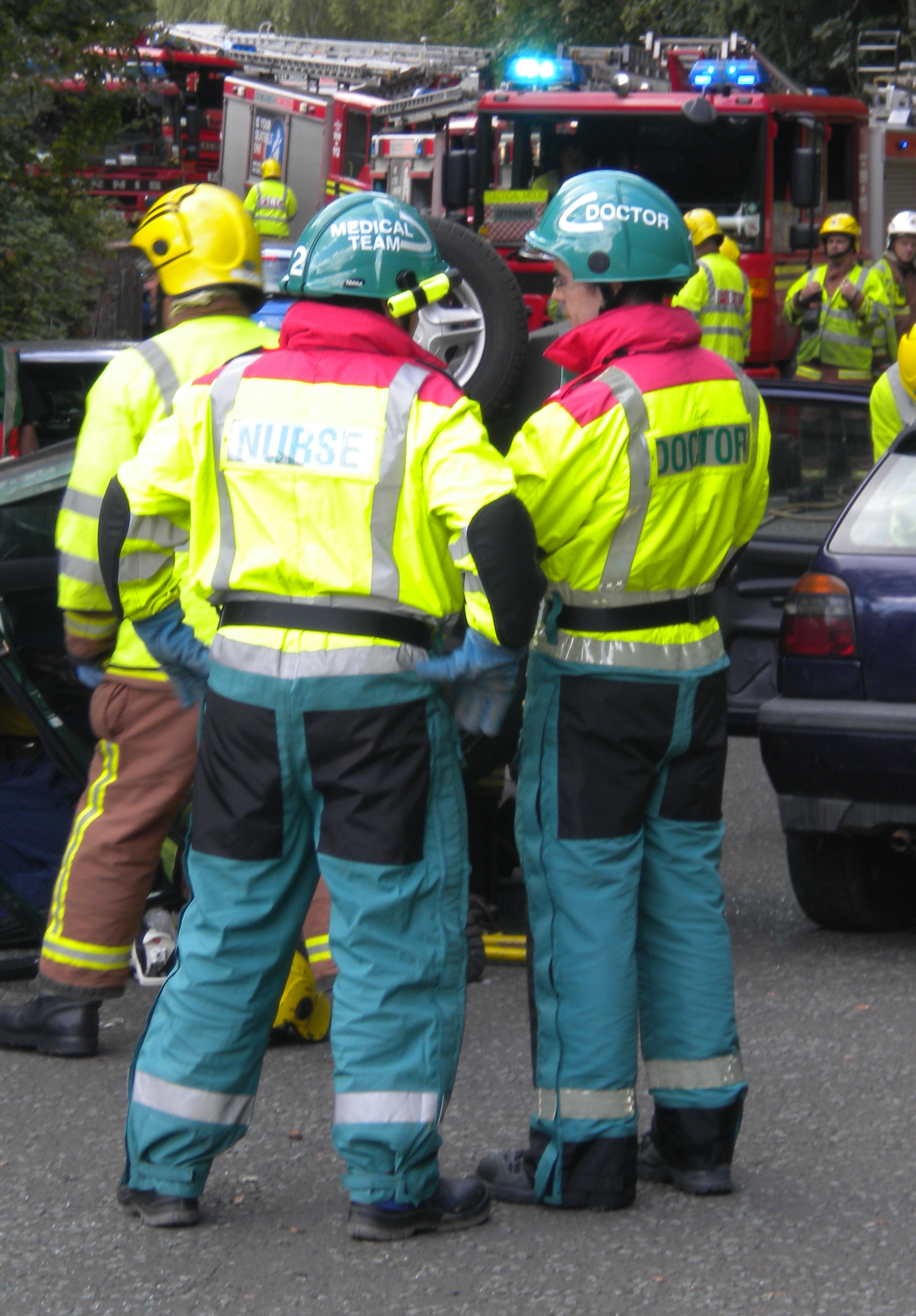
West Midlands CARE team doctor and nurse at the scene of an RTC exercise

=== Doctors ===
Team doctors come from a range of professional backgrounds: general practice, anaesthetics, emergency medicine, surgery and other specialities. All have had formal training in pre-hospital emergency medicine, and many of the team's doctors hold either the Diploma or Fellowship in Immediate Medical Care (DIMC / FIMC), awarded by the Faculty of Prehospital Care Royal College of Surgeons of Edinburgh. Many of the doctors from acute specialities will have undertaken specific in-house training and assessment in how to undertake pre-hospital rapid sequence induction of anaesthesia, as part of the management of the severely injured patient.

=== Nurses ===
All of the team's nurses have a professional background in acute care such as emergency departments or intensive care units, and all have also undertaken additional training in pre-hospital medicine. Some of the nurses on the team are MSc level advanced nurse practitioners and independent prescribers. As with the doctors, a period of mentored experience under the supervision of an experienced team nurse is mandatory before undertaking unsupervised practice. They are also encouraged to work towards the RCSEd Diploma in Immediate Care (DIMC).

=== Paramedics ===
Every team has at least one paramedic - a full-time employee of West Midlands Ambulance Service. For many years this position was filled by one of a group of experienced ambulance officers, usually paramedics. They drive the team's response vehicle and would usually fulfil the role of Ambulance Incident Officer of arrival: co-ordinating the resources on scene and liaising with the WMAS control room. They also undertook extra training related to the CARE team's skill set: having an awareness of the team's clinical procedures and specialist equipment.

In the summer of July 2013, a re-organisation of the Ambulance Service's stations resulted in a move of the CARE team's operational base. Alongside this, the paramedic officer position was replaced with paramedics from the Hazardous Area Response Team (HART). They receive additional training to support them in the CARE team role and bring with them the additional skills and experience of a HART operative. Alongside this change, it was also decided that the team could also include an appropriately skilled second paramedic, in place of a nurse or trainee.

=== Team trainees ===
Most shifts are augmented by a trainee: a fully qualified paramedic, nurse, or doctor who is undertaking their period of mentored experience upon joining the team. As part of a structured training programme, the team will teach individuals how to operate in the pre-hospital environment, with the eventual goal of them becoming a full member of the team.

=== Other health professionals ===
Professionals from other health backgrounds, such as Operating Department Practitioners or Physiotherapists are welcomed, but applicants will only be successful if they demonstrate sufficient experience in patient assessment and treatment in acute settings.

== Education and training ==
The team organises a number of educational activities and acts as a regional co-ordinator for the RCSEd Faculty of Pre-Hospital Care (FPHC). Team personnel contribute to education elsewhere, with some being examiners for the Faculty of Pre-hospital Care, or instructors for BASICS.

CARE Team educational work includes:

- Undergraduate Trauma Course: fourth year medical students at the University of Birmingham medical school undertake a two-day course introducing them to the fundamentals of pre-hospital trauma care. This course is validated by the FPHC and is a compulsory part of the curriculum. Many students continue on to careers in trauma and emergency medicine.
- FPHC (West Mids): monthly educational meetings at the Royal Orthopaedic Hospital, Birmingham. External speakers are invited to lecture on a variety of relevant topics to an open audience.
- Prehospital advanced cadaveric trauma skills course (PHACTS).
- Pre-Hospital Advanced Simulation Trauma & Emergency Resuscitation (PHASTER) Course.
- Pre-Hospital Emergency Anaesthesia - Assist (PHEA-A) Course.

== Funding ==
As a registered charity the organisation receives no government funding and relies on donations and income generated by its educational activities.

== See also ==
- West Midlands Ambulance Service
- Midlands Air Ambulance
- Emergency medical services in the United Kingdom
- Highland PICT Team
