= Tom Quinn (nurse) =

British Professor of cardiac nursing

Tom J. Quinn FRCN, FESC, FAHA, FACC was the UK's first Professor of cardiac nursing, and is a Fellow of the Royal College of Nursing (RCN) for his outstanding contribution to research and practice of cardiac nursing.

As at January 2025 he was Emeritus Professor at Kingston University covering research, development and consultancy in cardiovascular care issues, particularly emergency and critical cardiac care and policy. He was previously Professor of Cardiac Nursing at Coventry University. His NHS experience over almost three decades included periods at St Bartholomew's Hospital, the National Heart Hospital and York Hospital and at regional office, Strategic Health Authority, the Department of Health and NHS Modernisation Agency, and the ambulance service. He was clinical lead in the National Library for Health covering the cardiovascular, stroke and vascular specialist libraries.

He was instrumental in developing and writing the Department of Health's National Service Framework on heart disease and is a fellow of the European Society of Cardiology.

He has published more than 60 papers focusing on the care of patients with cardiac disease or developing nursing practice.

As well as being awarded Fellowship of the Royal College of Nursing in 2006 He was made a Fellow of the European Society of Cardiology in 1995 (Emeritus in 2022); Fellow of the American College of Cardiology (Emeritus from 2021); Fellow of the American Heart Association; and an Honorary Fellow, College of Paramedics
