= Tony Kemp (nurse) =

Anthony Edward Kemp, MBE MStJ is the Chief Officer of the British Association for Immediate Care. He is most well known for his previous role as chairman of the British Association for Immediate Care, and for his work in the 2015 Shoreham Airshow crash.

== Awards ==
Kemp was appointed a serving brother of the Order of Saint John by Queen Elizabeth II, in November 2011, for his work to nursing. He was appointed a Member of the Order of the British Empire in 2014 for "services to pre-hospital emergency care", in his role as the vice chairman of the British Association for Immediate Care. He received the Special Service Cross of the British Red Cross and a Royal Humane Society Testimonial on Vellum for his actions in rescuing a pilot in the aftermath of the 2015 Shoreham Airshow crash.

As at 2025 he was Principal Lecturer and Director of Post Qualifying Healthcare Education at the University of Bedfordshire
