= Gareth Davies (doctor) =

Dr Gareth Davies
- Born: Isle of Man
- Occupations: Emergency Medicine and Prehospital Doctor
- Known for: London HEMS
- Medical career
- Profession: Physician
- Institutions: Barts Health NHS Trust
- Research: Prehospital Care

Gareth Davies (born 10 March 1965) is a physician and consultant in emergency medicine and pre-hospital emergency medicine, working for the NHS at the Royal London Hospital, Whitechapel. He is best known for his role as lead doctor of the flight crew for the London Air Ambulance (HEMS) and has been seen many times on the BBC documentary television series Trauma, Trauma Uncut and An Hour to Save Your Life He has also made an appearance as a mentor in an episode of the CBBC series Hero Squad, and on Channel 5's Trauma Doctors.

== Early life and education ==
Davies was born and grew up in Douglas on the Isle of Man, famous for its Isle of Man TT motorcycle racing event. As a child, Davies was interested in motor sport and saw the consequences when people were injured. He would follow ambulances to the scenes of accidents to see what care was provided, noting the advanced medical care required.

On From the Top: Gareth Davies, an educational program broadcast on Channel 4, Davies recalled watching a television program from the United States at the age of 16: "It was about these firemen who delivered medical care as firemen, and they called themselves paramedics and that I thought was absolutely fantastic!" He formed a goal to become a paramedic. At that time paramedicine was in its infancy, so his options were either to join the fire service and try and do medicine, or pursue medical training. He chose the latter, hoping that one day he would be able to treat people at the roadside in a paramedic capacity.

After his A-levels, Davies completed five years of medical training at Sheffield Medical School.

== 7 July 2005 bombings ==
On the day of the 7 July 2005 London bombings, Davies was mobilised by London Ambulance Service along with the rest of the London HEMS team. He was deployed at Aldgate, where he was the Medical Incident Officer, and later re-deployed to Kings Cross.

== Management responsibilities ==
In addition to his NHS duties, he serves as the Medical Director of London's Air Ambulance Ltd (Company No. 2337239) and as a director of a number of other companies including London Air Ambulance Trading Ltd (Company No. 04836606), UK HEMS Ltd (Company No. 06491323), EMSC Ltd (Company No. 07179442) and Medical Excellence Ltd (Company No. 05668741).
