= Gareth Davies (television producer) =

Gareth Davies (fl. c. 2000) is a television producer.

His first Hollywood producing credit was the 1970 film The Juggler of Notre Dame. Since, he has produced for television, particularly series including 69 episodes of Remington Steele (two seasons each as producer and as co-executive producer) from 1982 to 1986, and 145 episodes of Buffy the Vampire Slayer from 1997 to 2003.

He should not be confused with the British television director and actor of the same name who was associated with the early work of television dramatist Dennis Potter.
