= List of EMS provider credentials =

An EMS provider's post-nominal (listed after the name) credentials usually follow his or her name in this order:

- Highest earned academic degree in or related to medicine, (e.g. "MD")
- Highest licensure or certification (e.g. "NRP")
- Further certifications (e.g. "CCEMT-P")

Generally, credentials are listed from most to least prestigious. A degree, once earned, cannot be taken away. Sometimes, licensure and certifications must be periodically renewed by examination or the completion of a prescribed number of continuing education units (CEUs).

EMS providers may also hold non-EMS credentials, including academic degrees. These are usually omitted unless they are related to the provider's job. For instance, a paramedic might not list an MBA, but a supervisor might choose to do so.

The provider's credentials are separated from the person's name (and from each other) with commas. There are usually no periods within the credentials (e.g. "EMT" not "E.M.T." or "PMD" not "Paramedic").

== A ==
- AAS - Associate of Applied Science
- ACLS - Advanced Cardiac Life Support
- ACLS-EP - Advanced Cardiac Life Support for Experienced Providers
- ACLS-I - Advanced Cardiac Life Support Instructor
- ACP - Advanced Care Paramedic (Canada)
- ACP - Advanced Clinical Practitioner (United Kingdom)
- ACP-F - Advanced Care Paramedic - Flight (Canada)
- AEMT - Advanced Emergency Medical Technician
- AEMT-I- Advanced Emergency Medical Technician - Intermediate
- AEMT-CC - Advanced Emergency Medical Technician - Critical Care
- AMLS - Advanced Medical Life Support
- AMLS-I - Advanced Medical Life Support Instructor
- ATLS - Advanced Trauma Life Support
- AWLS - Advanced Wilderness Life Support
- AEMSI - Assistant EMS Instructor

== B ==
- B.EMS - Bachelor in Emergency Medical Services
- B.S EMS - Bachelor of Science in Emergency Medical Services
- BLS - Basic Life Support
- BLS-I - Basic Life Support Instructor
- B.S EHS- Bachelor of Science in Emergency Health Services
- B.S EHS Ed.- Bachelor of Science in Emergency Health Services Education (may also have an S. for Specialist)
- BSP - Bachelor of Science in Paramedicine
- BTLS - Basic Trauma Life Support (ITLS)

== C ==
- CADS - Certified Ambulance Documentation Specialist
- CCP - Critical Care Paramedic (Canada)
- CCP-C Certified Critical Care Paramedic
- CCP-F - Critical Care Paramedic - Flight (Canada)
- CEMSO - Chief Emergency Medical Service Officer
- CFR - Certified First Responder
- CIC - Certified Instructor Coordinator
- CLI - Certified Lab Instructor
- C-NPT - Certified Neonatal & Pediatric Transport
- CP-C - Certified Community Paramedic
- CEP - Certified Emergency Paramedic
- C-EM - Certified Event Medic
- CEP-I - Continuing Education Program Instructor

== E ==
- EMA - Emergency Medical Attendant
- EMA-D - Emergency Medical Attendant - Defibrillator
- EMD - Emergency Medical Dispatcher
- EMPACT - Emergency Medical Patient: Assessment Care and Treatment
- EMR - Emergency Medical Responder
- EMSI - Emergency Medical Services Instructor
- EMT - Emergency Medical Technician
- EMT IC - Emergency Medical Technician - Instructor Coordinator
- AEMT - Advanced Emergency Medical Technician
- Paramedic - Paramedic
- Paramedic IC - Paramedic Instructor Coordinator
- EMT-AD - Emergency Medical Technician - Automatic Defibrillator
- EMT-CC - Emergency Medical Technician - Critical Care
- EMT-CT - Emergency Medical Technician - Cardiac Tech
- EMT-T - Emergency Medical Technician - Tactical
- EMT-ST - Emergency Medical Technician - Shock Trauma
- EPC - Emergency Pediatric Care
- ERT - Emergency Room Technician
- ENLS-Emergency Neurological Life Support

== F ==
- FACPE - Executive Paramedic Officer: Fellow of the College of Paramedic Executives
- FP-C - Certified Flight Paramedic (IBSC)
- FF-EMT - Firefighter Emergency Medical Technician
- FF-AEMT - Firefighter Advanced Emergency Medical Technician
- FF-Paramedic - Firefighter Paramedic
- FF-P - Firefighter Paramedic
- FF-NRP - Firefighter, Nationally Registered Paramedic
- FTO - Field Training Officer

== G ==
- GEMS - Geriatric Education for Emergency Medical Services
- GEMS-I - Geriatric Education for Emergency Medical Services Instructor

== I ==
- IC - Instructor/Coordinator
- ITLS Basic - International Trauma Life Support Basic (previously BTLS)
- ITLS Advanced - Advanced International Trauma Life Support
- ITLS Access - Access International Trauma Life Support
- ITLS Military - Military International Trauma Life Support
- ITLS Pediatric - Pediatric International Trauma Life Support

== L ==
- LI - Lead Instructor
- LP - Licensed Paramedic

== M ==
- MICP - Mobile Intensive Care Unit Paramedic
- MPH - Master's in Public Health

== N ==
- NCEE - Nationally Credentialed EMS Educator
- ENP - Emergency Nurse Practitioner
- NICP - Neonatal Intensive Care Paramedic
- NREMR - National Registry Emergency Medical Responder
- NRAEMT - National Registry Emergency Medical Technician - Advanced
- NREMT- National Registry Emergency Medical Technician
- NRP - Nationally Registered Paramedic
- NQEMT - Pre-Hospital Emergency Care Council Emergency Medical Technician
- NQEMT-P - Pre-Hospital Emergency Care Council Paramedic
- NQEMT-AP - Pre-Hospital Emergency Care Council Advanced Paramedic

== P ==
- PALS - Pediatric Advanced Life Support
- PALS-I - Pediatric Advanced Life Support Instructor
- PA-C - Physician Assistant (Certified)
- PCP - Primary Care Paramedic (Canada)
- PEPP - Pediatric Education for Pre-Hospital Professionals
- PHRN - Prehospital Registered Nurse
- PHTLS - Prehospital Trauma Life Support
- PNCCT - Pediatric and Neonatal Critical Care Transport
- PMD - Paramedic

== R ==
- RP - Registered Paramedic
- RN - Registered Nurse
- RT(R) - Registered Radiologic Technologist
- RRA - Registered Radiologist Assistant (Midlevel Provider)
- RRT - Registered Respiratory Therapist
- RRT-NPS - Registered Respiratory Therapist - Neonatal Pediatric Specialist
- RRT-ACCS - Registered Respiratory Therapist - Adult Critical Care Specialist

== S ==
- SARTECH - Search and Rescue Technician
- SEI - Senior EMS Instructor

== T ==
- TCCC - Tactical Combat Casualty Care
- TECC - Tactical Emergency Casualty Care
- TP-C - Certified Tactical Paramedic
- TR-C - Certified Tactical Responder

== W ==
- WEMT - Wilderness Emergency Medical Technician
- WFR - Wilderness First Responder
- WP-C - Certified Wilderness Paramedic

== See also ==
- List of nursing credentials
