= Emergency medical responder levels by U.S. state =

In the United States, the licensing of prehospital emergency medical providers and oversight of emergency medical services are governed at the state level. Each state is free to add or subtract levels as each state sees fit. Therefore, due to differing needs and system development paths, the levels, education requirements, and scope of practice of prehospital providers varies from state to state. Even though primary management and regulation of prehospital providers is at the state level, the federal government does have a model scope of practice including minimum skills for EMRs, EMTs, Advanced EMTs and Paramedics set through the National Highway Traffic Safety Administration (NHTSA).

While states are able to set their own additional requirements for state certification, a quasi-national certification body exists in the form of the National Registry of Emergency Medical Technicians (NREMT). The NREMT offers a national certification based on the NHTSA National Standard curriculum for the levels of EMR, EMT, Advanced EMT and Paramedic. Individual states are allowed to use NREMT certification as part of their certification process, but are not required to. As of 2011, 38 states use the NREMT examination for EMT certification and 45 states use the NREMT examination for Paramedic certification. These levels are denoted below using an asterisk (*). At present time, use of the NREMT examination for EMT-Intermediate 85 and 99 have not been included in this list.

Any provider between the levels of Emergency medical technician and Paramedic is either a form of EMT-Intermediate or an Advanced EMT. The use of the terms "EMT-Intermediate/85" and "EMT-Intermediate/99" denotes use of the NHTSA EMT-Intermediate 1985 curriculum and the EMT-Intermediate 1999 curriculum respectively. In addition, not all states use the "EMT" prefix for all levels (e.g. Texas uses EMT-Paramedic and Licensed Paramedic). Finally, some states have levels that have partially been phased out. While no new certifications are provided at this level, providers can sometimes be grandfathered in provided they meet recertification requirements. Any level that has been completely phased out (i.e. not used for new or continuing providers) is not listed.

Some states have certifications allowing other healthcare providers, such as Registered Nurses and Physician Assistants, to practice in the prehospital setting. Others require all EMS responders to obtain EMT or paramedic qualifications regardless of other licensure.

In the list, each state's certification levels are provided from most basic at the top to most advanced at the bottom.

== Alabama ==
- Emergency Medical Responder (EMR)
- Emergency Medical Technician (EMT)
- Advanced Emergency Medical Technician (AEMT)
- Emergency Medical Technician Intermediate (EMT-I) **(Alabama is no longer certifying new EMT-Is (as of 2003). However, existing providers continue to be allowed to practice under this level of certification.)
- Paramedic

== Alaska ==
- Emergency Trauma Technician (ETT) (Analogous to EMR)
- Emergency Medical Technician I (EMT-I) (Analogous to EMT via NREMT)
- Emergency Medical Technician II (EMT-II) (Analogous to EMT-I/85)
- Emergency Medical Technician III (EMT-III) (Analogous to AEMT/85)
- Advanced Emergency Medical Technician (AEMT) (Established in 2015, follows and is certified via the NREMT testing process)
- Mobile Intensive Care Paramedic (MICP) (Analogous to Paramedic via NREMT)

== Arizona ==
- EMT-Basic
- Advanced EMT
- EMT-Intermediate. Please note: Arizona is no longer certifying new EMT-Is. However, existing certifications continue to be allowed to practice under this level of certification.
- Paramedic

== Arkansas ==
- Emergency Medical Responder (Not recognized by the Arkansas Department of Health, certification issued by local EMS Authorities and/or the Arkansas Fire Training Academy)
- Emergency Medical Technician (EMT)
- Advanced Emergency Medical Technician (AEMT)
- Paramedic
- Community Paramedic

== California ==
- Public Safety (Acts as EMR but is separate from the NREMT Certification for it. Is issued to Firefighters and Police Officers, usually after their P.O.S.T. Certification or their Fire Academy if the individual chooses not to pursue EMT. It is also separate from individual BLS and CPR Certifications. It is officially recognized by the California EMS Authority.)
- Emergency Medical Technician (EMT)
- Advanced Emergency Medical Technician* (AEMT)
- Paramedic
- Critical Care Paramedic Endorsement for Paramedic Level* (It is offered in and recognized in some counties in California.)

== Colorado ==
- Emergency Medical Responder (EMR)
- Emergency Medical Technician (EMT)
  - EMT with intravenous authorization (EMT- IV is not a separate certification level but an authorization by an agency physician medical director after verification of approved education and skills competency)
- Advanced EMT (AEMT)
- EMT-Intermediate (EMT-I)
- Paramedic
  - Paramedic with Critical Care endorsement (P-CC)
  - Paramedic with Community Paramedic endorsement (P-CP)

Colorado EMS Scope of Practice and Education Standard Comparison

== Connecticut ==
- Emergency Medical Responder (EMR)
- Emergency Medical Technician (EMT)
- Advanced Emergency Medical Technician (AEMT)
- Paramedic (Paramedics are Licensed professionals in Connecticut, whereas all other levels of EMS providers are certified and must participate in bi-annual continuing education following the current NREMT NCCP)

== Delaware ==
- First Responder
- EMT-Basic
- EMT-Paramedic

== District of Columbia ==
- Emergency Medical Responder (EMR)*
- Emergency Medical Technician (EMT)*
- Advanced Emergency Medical Technician (AEMT)*
- Emergency Medical Technician-Intermediate (EMT-I) (no new licenses granted)
- Paramedic*

== Florida ==
- Emergency Medical Technician
- Paramedic

== Georgia ==
- Emergency Medical Technician-Responder (EMT-R) (similar to NREMT EMR)
- Emergency Medical Technician (EMT)
- Emergency Medical Technician-Intermediate (EMT-I) (no new licenses granted)
- Advanced Emergency Medical Technician (AEMT)
- Cardiac Technician (no new licenses granted since 1998, similar to the NREMT-I/99)
- Paramedic (at least 504 classroom hours plus 320 clinical hours)

== Hawaii ==
- EMT (analogue to Advanced EMT)
- Paramedic (also known as Mobile Intensive Care Technician or MICT)

== Idaho ==
- Emergency Medical Responder (EMR-2011)
- Emergency Medical Technician (EMT-2011)
- Advanced Emergency Medical Technician-85 (AEMT-85) (No new licenses granted)
- Advanced Emergency Medical Technician-2011
- Paramedic-2011

== Illinois ==
- Emergency Medical Responder (EMR)
- EMT-Basic
- Advanced EMT
- Paramedic
- Pre-hospital Registered Nurse (PHRN)

== Indiana ==
- Emergency Medical Responder (EMR)
- EMT (Emergency Medical Technician)
- Advanced EMT
- Paramedic

== Iowa ==
- First Responder
- EMT-Basic
- EMT-Intermediate (analogous to EMT-Intermediate/85)
- EMT-Advanced
- EMT-Paramedic (analogous to EMT-Intermediate/99)
- Paramedic Specialist (analogous to EMT-Paramedic)
- Critical Care Paramedic Endorsement for Paramedic

Transition to new levels began January 2011, and finished in March 2015.

- Emergency Medical Responder (EMR)
- Emergency Medical Technician (EMT)
- Advanced Emergency Medical Technician (AEMT)
- Paramedic
- Critical Care Paramedic Endorsement for Paramedic level certification

== Kansas ==
- Emergency Medical Responder (EMR) - Formerly known as First Responder
- Emergency Medical Technician (EMT)
- Advanced Emergency Medical Technician (AEMT)
- Paramedic (EMT-P)

== Kentucky ==
- Emergency Medical Responder (EMR)
- Emergency Medical Technician (EMT)
- Advanced Emergency Medical Technician (AEMT)
- Paramedic
- Advanced Practice Paramedic
  - Community Paramedic
  - Wilderness Paramedic
  - Critical Care Paramedic
  - Flight Paramedic
  - Tactical Paramedic

== Louisiana ==
- EMR-Emergency Medical Responder
- EMT-Emergency Medical Technician
- AEMT-Advanced EMT
- Paramedic (formerly EMT-P)

== Maine ==
- Emergency Medical Responder
- Ambulance Attendant (no new licenses granted since 1996)
- EMT
- Advanced AEMT
- EMT-Critical Care (no new licenses after 1998)
- Paramedic

== Maryland ==
- Emergency Medical Responder (EMR)
- Emergency Medical Technician-Basic (EMT)*
- Cardiac Rescue Technician-Intermediate* (CRT-I) (analogous to EMT – Intermediate/99)(MIEMMS is only recertifying current EMT-Cardiacs)
- Paramedic

== Massachusetts ==
- EMS First Responder (EFR)
- EMT-Basic
- EMT-Advanced
- EMT-Paramedic

== Michigan ==
- Emergency Medical Responder (EMR) (Also Medical First Responder)
- Emergency Medical Technician (EMT) (formerly EMT - Basic)
- Advanced Emergency Medical Technician (AEMT) (analogous to EMT-Intermediate/85)
- Paramedic (formerly EMT-Paramedic)

== Minnesota ==
- Emergency Medical Responder
- Emergency Medical Technician
- Paramedic
- Community Paramedic
- Registered Physician Assistant-EMT

== Mississippi ==
- Medical First Responder
- EMT-Basic
- EMT-Intermediate/99 (no new licenses granted at this level since 2002, however previous holders can continue to renew theirs)
- AEMT
- EMT-Paramedic

== Missouri ==
- EMT-Basic
- Advanced EMT (AEMT)
- EMT-Paramedic

== Montana ==
(Endorsements are listed below each level, are optional and can be achieved in any order and combination.)

- EMR-Emergency Medical Responder
  - Monitoring
- EMT-Emergency Medical Technician
  - Airway
  - IV and IO administration
  - IV and IO maintenance
  - Medication
- Advanced EMT
- Paramedic
  - Critical Care Transport
  - Community Integrated Healthcare Paramedic

== Nebraska ==
- Emergency Medical Responder
- EMT-Basic
- AEMT
- EMT-Paramedic

== Nevada ==
- First Responder
- EMT
- Advanced EMT
- Paramedic
- CCT-Paramedic
- EMS RN

== New Hampshire ==
- First Responder
- EMT
- Advanced EMT
- EMT-Paramedic

== New Jersey ==
- Emergency Medical Responder (EMR)
- Emergency Medical Technician (EMT)*
- Mobile Intensive Care Paramedic (MICP)
- Mobile Intensive Care Nurse (MICN)

== New Mexico ==
- EMS First Responder
- EMT-Basic
- EMT-Intermediate
- EMT-Paramedic

== New York ==
- Certified First Responder
- EMT-Basic
- Advanced EMT
- AEMT-Critical Care (discontinued)
- AEMT-Paramedic

== North Carolina ==
- Emergency Medical Responder (EMR)
- EMT
- AEMT (Advanced EMT)
- Paramedic

== North Dakota ==
- First Responder
- Advanced First Aid Ambulance (no new licenses)
- EMT (analogous to EMT-Basic; only used for providers under the age of 18 and providers requesting reciprocity from another state)
- EMT-Basic
- AEMT-Advanced EMT
- EMT-Paramedic

== Ohio ==
- Emergency Medical Responder (EMR)
- Emergency Medical Technician (EMT)
- Advanced EMT (AEMT)
- Paramedic

== Oklahoma ==
- Emergency Medical Responder (EMR)
- EMT-Basic
- EMT-Intermediate/85
- EMT-Paramedic

== Oregon ==
- Emergency Medical Responder (EMR)(National Curriculum)
- EMT (National Curriculum)
- Advanced EMT (National Curriculum)
- EMT Intermediate (State Curriculum)
- Paramedic (National Curriculum) (requires a college degree)

== Pennsylvania ==
- Emergency Medical Services Vehicle Operator (EMSVO)
- Emergency Medical Responder (EMR)
- Emergency Medical Technician (EMT)
- Advanced Emergency Medical Technician (AEMT)
- Paramedic (P)
- Prehospital Registered Nurse (PHRN)
- Prehospital Physician Extender (PHPE)
- Prehospital Physician (PHP)
- Medical Command Physician (MCP)
- EMS-Instructor (EMS-I) (Additional endorsement)

== Puerto Rico ==
- EMT-Provisional License (Student)
- EMT-Basic
- EMT-Paramedic

== Rhode Island ==
- Emergency Medical Responder (EMR)
- Emergency Medical Technician (EMT)
- Advanced Emergency Medical Technician (AEMT)
- Advanced Emergency Medical Technician Cardiac (AEMT-C) (State Specific)
- Paramedic

== South Carolina ==
- EMT-Basic
- EMT-Advanced
- EMT-Paramedic

== South Dakota ==
- Emergency Medical Responder (EMR)
- Emergency Medical Technician (EMT)
- Emergency Medical Technician - Intermediate/85
- Advanced Emergency Medical Technician (AEMT)
- Emergency Medical Technician - Intermediate/99
- Emergency Medical Technician - Paramedic

== Tennessee ==
- Emergency Medical Responder (EMR)
- Emergency Medical Technician (EMT)
- Advanced Emergency Medical Technician (AEMT)
- Paramedic
- Critical Care Paramedic (now officially endorsed by the state)

== Texas ==
- Emergency Care Attendant
- EMT
- AEMT (formerly EMT-I)
- Certified Paramedic
- Licensed Paramedic (*Degree Requirement* Requires either an associate degree in EMS -OR- a bachelor's degree in any field.)

== Utah ==
- Emergency Medical Responder (EMR)
- Emergency Medical Technician (EMT)
- Advanced Emergency Medical Technician (AEMT)
- Paramedic

Now have been phased out of the state of Utah:

- EMT-Intermediate (state specific, phased out by Sept. 30 2013 however any EMT with this certification before Sept. 30 2013 could still be an intermediate and by the next recert cycle had to switch to AEMT)
- EMT-Intermediate Advanced (analogous to EMT-Intermediate/99, phased out by Sept. 30, 2013)

== Vermont ==
- Vermont Emergency First Responder (VEFR)
- Emergency Medical Responder (EMR)
- Emergency Medical Technician (EMT)
- Advanced Emergency Medical Technician (AEMT)
- Paramedic
- Critical Care Paramedic (Requires IBSC CCP-C or FP-C certification or UBMC CCEMT-P course)

== Virginia ==
- Emergency Medical Responder (EMR)
- Emergency Medical Technician (EMT)
- Advanced Emergency Medical Technician (AEMT) (The transition from Emergency Medical Technician-Enhanced to AEMT occurred between 2013 and 2016.)
- EMT-Intermediate (EMT-I) (As of January 1, 2020 no new certifications are issued. Providers certified before 2020 may still practice under EMT-I (I/99) certification level, and renew it indefinitely with completion of CME hours each cycle.)
- Paramedic

== Washington ==
- Emergency Medical Responder (EMR)
- EMT
- AEMT (Advanced EMT)
- Paramedic

== West Virginia ==
- Emergency Medical Responder
- EMT-Mining (specialty certification)
- EMT-Basic
- Advanced Care Technician
- EMT-Paramedic
- Mobile Critical Care Paramedic

== Wisconsin ==
- EMR (Emergency Medical Responder)
- EMT (Emergency Medical Technician)
- AEMT (Advanced Emergency Medical Technician)
- EMT-Intermediate (Emergency Medical Technician Intermediate) No new EMT-Intermediates certified.
- Paramedic
- Community Paramedic
- Critical Care Paramedic Endorsement
- TEMS (Tactical Emergency Medical Service Endorsement) Primarily for SWAT teams

== Wyoming ==
- EMR (Emergency Medical Responder
- EMT (Emergency Medical Technician
- AEMT (Advanced Emergency Medical Technician
- IEMT (Intermediate Emergency Medical Technician)
- Paramedic

Wyoming has adopted the National Registry model with an addition of IEMT. The IEMT has all of the skills of an AEMT with the addition of additional medications, endotracheal intubation, cardiac drugs and skills (manual defibrillator, epi 1:10000, etc.) chest darts and pain management. National Registry is not required, and not accepted for licensing in Wyoming.
