= Advanced emergency medical technician =

Emergency medical services provider

An advanced emergency medical technician (AEMT) is a provider of emergency medical services in the United States. A transition to this level of training from the emergency medical technician-intermediate, which have somewhat less training, began in 2013 and has been implemented by most states. AEMTs are not intended to deliver definitive medical care in most cases, but rather to augment prehospital critical care and provide rapid on-scene treatment. AEMTs are usually employed in ambulance services, working in conjunction with EMTs and paramedics; however they are also commonly found in fire departments and law enforcement agencies as non-transporting first responders. Ambulances operating at the AEMT level of care are commonplace in rural areas, and occasionally found in larger cities as part of a tiered-response system, but are overall much less common than EMT- and paramedic-level ambulances. The AEMT provides a low-cost, high-benefit option to provide advanced-level care when the paramedic level of care is not feasible. The AEMT is authorized to provide limited advanced life support, which is beyond the scope of an EMT.

== Education and training ==
Advanced EMTs must be certified as EMTs prior to seeking certification as AEMTs in most states. However, in some states AEMT is the introductory level and may not require prerequisites. Certification as an AEMT involves a class lasting from three to six months, the curriculum for which is largely outlined by the NAEMT but can vary slightly from state to state. AEMT training is regulated at both the state and federal level. At the federal level, the National Highway Traffic Safety Administration (NHTSA) has developed a minimum content and hour curriculum, known as the National Standard Curriculum, but this is not binding on the states. Along with classroom time, the AEMT student is required to complete several hours of clinical experience in an advanced life support ambulance or other ALS environment such as an emergency department. During these clinical hours, the AEMT student must successfully demonstrate full practical knowledge of skills learned. Upon completion of all classroom and practical skills hours, AEMT students must successfully pass a standardized psychomotor and cognitive assessment before they can be certified.

AEMTs are trained to provide Intermediate Life Support.Some states use terms such as limited advanced life support (LALS) to differentiate between the paramedic and AEMT scope of practices.

== Historical ==
In the 1970s as EMS levels were being designated, the NREMT issued certifications at only two levels; EMT-ambulance and EMT-paramedic. During the late 1970s and early 1980s some states started their own designations at levels in-between EMT-A and EMT-P. In the early 80s, the NREMT Board of Directors adopted a new national certification; EMT-Intermediate, based on several state's recommendations. In 1985 the Department of Transportation developed the first national standard curriculum for this new level of EMT/intermediate. The 1985 course provided advanced knowledge and mainly three "advanced interventions" (at that time); IVs, MAST trouser application and use of the esophageal obturator airway. Simply stated, EMT-I care centered on trauma patients. Soon after 1985 some states started adding "enhancements" (skills) to the intermediate and others adopted a more expansive level called "cardiac care" which included some ACLS drugs. In 1994 a blue ribbon panel of EMS stakeholders gathered and endorsed the EMS Education and Practice Blueprint. That blueprint was to resolve the fragmented levels of intermediates used across the nation. In 1999 the Department of Transportation, based upon the blueprint, developed a national standard curriculum for the EMT-intermediate. Immediately it ran into political opposition and the National Association of State EMS Directors (now the National Association of State EMS Officials) asked the NREMT board to continue to offer intermediate certifications at both the former (I-85) and the new (I-99) designated levels.

== EMT-I/85 ==
EMT-I/85 is a level of EMT-I training formulated by the National Registry of Emergency Medical Technicians in 1985. This training level includes more invasive procedures than are covered at the EMT-Basic level, including IV therapy, the use of advanced airway devices, and provides for advanced assessment skills. The EMT-I/85 typically administered the same medications as an EMT-B (oxygen, oral glucose, activated charcoal, epinephrine auto-injectors (EpiPens), nitroglycerin, and metered-dose inhalers such as albuterol). However, in some states they were also allowed to administer naloxone, D50, and glucagon. Like all other EMT levels, their scope of practice was governed by the state or their medical director.

== EMT-I/99 ==
The EMT-I/99 level was the closest level of certification to paramedic, and allowed many techniques not available to the EMT-I/85 or EMT-basic. These techniques included needle decompression of a tension pneumothorax, endotracheal intubation, nasogastric tube placement, use of cardiac event monitors/ECGs, and administering medication to control certain cardiac arrhythmias.

== Advanced EMT ==
The advanced EMT or AEMT is the new mid-level EMS provider that has been introduced at the national level according to the new national EMS scope of practice model. The AEMT replaced the EMT-I/85 and EMT-I/99, however some states have continued to teach similar levels, but they are not nationally recognized. The new scope consists of all EMT level skills, basic airway management and the insertion of supraglottic airways, suctioning of an already intubated patient, usage of a CPAP device, initiation of peripheral intravenous therapy, pediatric and adult intraosseous placement and several pharmacological interventions beyond the EMT level. These pharmacological interventions include administering

- Non-medicated intravenous fluids (e.g. 0.9% normal saline)
- Sublingual nitroglycerin (service-supplied without needing medical direction)
- Epinephrine 1:1,000 for anaphylaxis and epinephrine 1:10,000 for cardiac arrest
- Dextrose 50%, dextrose 25%, and glucagon for hypoglycemia
- Naloxone for opioid overdoses
- Nitrous oxide for pain management
- Inhaled beta agonist medications (e.g. albuterol and ipratropium) for respiratory emergencies caused by asthma, COPD, etc.

Other states may use different names for the above and often have a scope of practice beyond the minimal national standards. The EMT-I/99 had a total of three recertification cycles to meet the requirements to transition to the paramedic level, while the EMT-I/85 had two recertification cycles to transition to the AEMT.

== Scope of practice ==
In addition to the standards established by the United States Department of Transportation (DOT), some states issue licenses for more specialized levels of training.

Alaska has an EMT-II, which is very similar to the I/85 standard, and the EMT-III, which is closer to the I/99 standard. A sponsoring physician can broaden the scope of an EMT-III beyond state-defined protocols by providing additional training and quality control measures. This means that additional drugs and procedures (including wound suturing) can be accomplished by an appropriately trained EMT-III. The EMT-III program is a short upgrade program, and does not generally receive reciprocity with other states.

Arkansas licenses EMS providers at the levels of EMT, AEMT, and paramedic, following the NREMT guidelines for these levels. In addition to the National Scope of Practice, AEMTs in Arkansas can start Intraosseous infusions in adults and provide CPAP to patients with pulmonary edema. AEMTs in Arkansas are becoming more commonplace, especially in areas where 911 service has been traditionally provided by BLS-level services. AEMTs and paramedics in Arkansas are allowed to provide advanced interventions when off-duty, if in their normal coverage area.

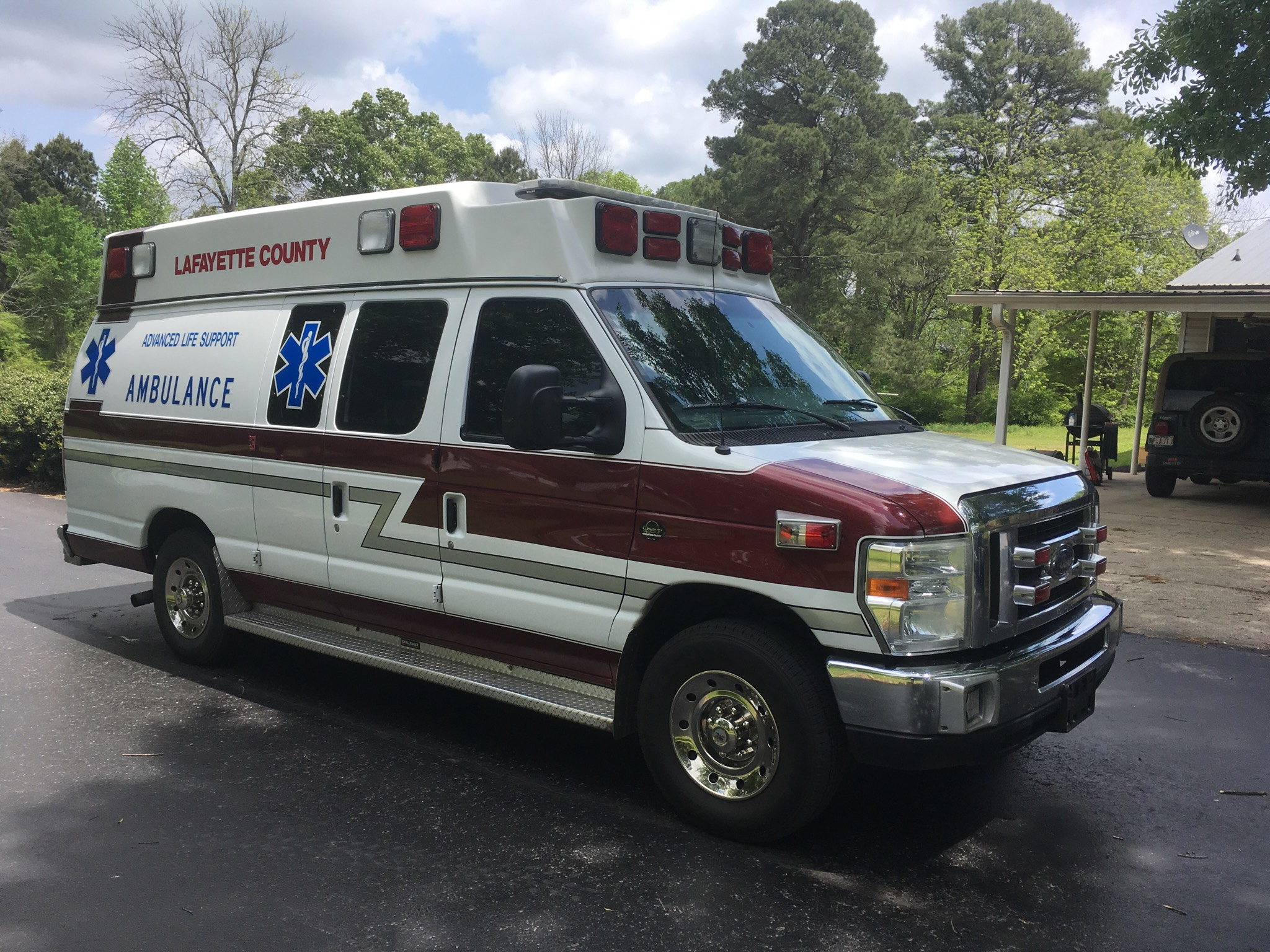
An advanced emergency medical technician ambulance with the Lafayette County Ambulance Service in Lafayette County, Arkansas

California uses an EMT designation which is equivalent to the national EMT-basic, and advanced EMT, which is the intermediate level or limited advanced life support, followed by paramedic, ALS level.

Connecticut recognizes the four levels of EMS provider, EMR, EMT, AEMT and paramedic. All four level of EMS provider are required to enter based on NREMT exams. In 2017, all "AEMTs" (which were essentially EMT intermediate 85s) were required to either complete current AEMT training and obtain NREMT certification at that level, or revert to the EMT level.

Iowa EMT-basics can administer EpiPen per protocol, insert a combitube, and set up and maintain (but not start) an IV that is non-medicated as well as all other basic skills. EMT-Intermediates can establish IVs in addition to the EMT-basic skills. An Iowa paramedic is a NREMT-intermediate/99 and is not the highest level of care in Iowa. This allows them to insert ET tubes and perform needle decompressions, manual defibrillations and medication administrations. The Iowa paramedic specialist is the NREMT-paramedic. Iowa also has a critical care endorsement for paramedic specialists.

Massachusetts recognizes the DOT levels of: EMT-basic, advanced EMT, and paramedic. EMT-intermediates in Massachusetts followed the same protocols as the EMT-basics, but were allowed to start IVs, perform fluid resuscitation, perform an ALS assessment, and insert advanced airways such as endotracheal tubes, combitubes, and laryngeal mask airways. The EMT-intermediate level in Massachusetts has been phased out and replaced by the advanced EMT; however most of the scope of practice remained the same.

Maine recognizes three levels, EMT basic, EMT-advanced, and EMT-paramedic. EMT-advanced in the state of Maine can provide many different treatments including IV therapy, EKG monitoring, 12 lead EKG placement (however, an EMT-paramedic must interpret the cardiac rhythm), dextrose (D50), glucagon, and other medications. Advanced EMTs can also place laryngeal mask airway devices and use CPAP when needed. Some treatments and medications require consultation with online medical direction.

Michigan uses the National Registry AEMT examination, but does not require continued national registration when an AEMT renews.

New York State has an AEMT-CC (advanced EMT - critical care) certification, which is unique to New York, and is more advanced than a nationally recognized AEMT. In addition to the national scope of practice, New York also authorizes its AEMT-CCs to intubate patients and do three lead ecg monitoring as well as twelve lead in certain counties, in addition to providing certain cardiac medications and cardiac care, including cardioversion. In more recent years, New York has expanded its AEMT-CC level to include the administration of certain narcotics and some additional skills. In order to transition to the national standard, NYS has introduced an additional AEMT certification that meets national standard as of 2013. It still must be recognized by its regional EMS councils in order for those regions to begin implementing its use. However, progress has been steady, with the most recent county to accept the new level of certification being Nassau County (located on Long Island). Nassau recognized this level in mid-2017. In 2018, NYS began a 10-year phase-out of its unique AEMT-CC level of certification. However, no advanced EMT certifications are recognized in New York City except at volunteer agencies such as Hatzalah EMS and Central Park Ambulance. One either functions as an EMT-B or a paramedic within FDNY and affiliated services.

North Carolina has had an expansive scope for AEMTs since 2023. AEMTs are permitted, based upon local protocol adoption (as the protocols are optional), to intubate, insert supraglottic airways, start IVs and IOs, manually defibrillate in cardiac arrest, perform chest needle decompressions in traumatic arrests, and use a range of medications such as Epinephrine, Albuterol, Atrovent, Famotidine, Toradol, Magnesium Sulfate, IV Steroids, Antibiotics, Antipsychotics like Haldol, Dextrose, Glucagon, TXA, and Antiemetics like Zofran and Reglan. Adoption of these protocols are scattered with some agencies no longer recognizing AEMTs (Like Wake County EMS in Raleigh or MEDIC Mecklenberg in Charlotte), others adopting only some of the updated scope, and some adopting the entire updated scope.

Oklahoma recognized an EMT-cardiac level until recently. However, that level has been phased out and providers in Oklahoma at the EMT-cardiac level have since been trained and certified to the paramedic level or downgraded to EMT-I.

Oregon Recognizes both the National standard AEMT as well as an EMT INTERMEDIATE level. The Oregon EMT-I practices under a heavily modified I-99 Scope and is allowed to give a number of additional meds by standing order including opioids such as morphine and fentanyl, Antiemetics like Zofran and a limited range of cardiac anti-dysrythmics including Epinephrine 1:10000, Atropine, Amiodarone and Lidocaine. They can also operate a cardiac defibrillator in manual mode, provide basic interpretation of 4 and 12 lead ECGs and use nasogastric and orogastric tubes. EMT-I certifications are still actively offered at several of the states Community Colleges.

Pennsylvania uses the National Registry AEMT examination, but does not require continued national registration when an AEMT renews. The Pennsylvania scope of practice for AEMTs is similar to the national scope except Pennsylvania adds: diphenhydramine (IV/IO/PO only), epinephrine 1:10,000 (for cardiac arrest only), ketorolac, naloxone (IN/IM/IV/IO only), and ondansetron.

Rhode Island's first-level ALS provider is EMT-cardiac, which is unique to Rhode Island. The EMT-C is a certification between the EMT-I and EMT-P, allowing the use of more cardiac drugs than the EMT-I, but fewer than the EMT-P. The time and cost of an EMT-C program is generally less than one third that of an EMT-P program. EMT-C or higher licensure may be required by Rhode Island fire departments, who provide emergency medical services in the majority of the state.

Tennessee EMTs are licensed at either the EMT-IV (intravenous therapy) level or the EMT-paramedic level. EMT-IVs are trained to the NREMT-B standard in accordance with DOT regulations, as well as receive additional training in advanced airway management, administration of epinephrine 1:1000 in anaphylaxis, administration of nebulized and aerosolized beta-2 agonists such as Xopenex and albuterol, administration of D50W and D25W, IV therapy and access, and trauma life support including the use of MAST trousers. EMT-IVs can also administer nitroglycerin and aspirin in the event of cardiac emergencies, and can give glucagon. EMT-IVs can also administer the Mark 1 auto injector kit for organophosphate poisoning and suspected nerve gas exposure. The State of Tennessee Board of EMS is currently evaluating allowing EMT-IVs to administer naloxone, nitrous oxide as well as intraosseous infusions (IOs). The board has accepted the new levels of EMR, EMT, EMT-advanced, and paramedic. Gap analysis has been completed by the state and the board has moved to allow up to four years for the EMT-IV to transition to EMT-advanced by way of an eight-hour course, choosing to let all EMT-IVs and paramedics under the current standard be renewed as usual for this cycle.

Texas has a five-tier system, consisting of emergency care attendant, EMT-basic, advanced EMT, EMT-paramedic, and paramedic.

In Virginia, the first level of ALS is advanced EMT. The AEMT certification replaced the EMT-enhanced, unique to Virginia, starting in 2013 and fully replaced in the EMT-E certification in 2016. The EMT-E was essentially equivalent to the EMT-I/85 and could start IV lines, perform dual-lumen airway insertion, and administer some medications such as D50W, glucagon, albuterol, epinephrine, and sometimes narcotics, but could not administer any cardiac medications. The next level of ALS is EMT-intermediate, which replaced the EMT-cardiac technician beginning in 2002, and is equivalent to the I/99 level of certification. In most jurisdictions, the EMT-I operates under the same protocols as a paramedic. There are a few procedures that only EMT-intermediates cannot perform, including rapid sequence intubation, surgical cricothyrotomy, and needle cricothyrotomy. In 2020, Virginia began phasing out the EMT-I. Existing EMT-intermediates may continue to practice and maintain their certifications indefinitely, but no new certifications are issued. ALS certifications are now limited to either AEMT or paramedic.

In the state of Washington, EMT-basic protocols are similar to those in Iowa. Certified EMT-B personnel can administer EpiPen per state protocols and can insert a combitube. The Washington EMT-B can set up and maintain an IV that is non-medicated, but EMT-I certification is required to start the IV.WA Office of Emergency Medical and Trauma System (May 2009) Some county protocols (such as Jefferson) accept an EMT/ILS tech which, in addition to all EMT-I and EMT-B skills, can administer D50W, naloxone, albuterol, and can now draw up epinephrine in addition to using an EpiPen.

Wisconsin offers licensure at the advanced EMT level. This allows providers to start peripheral IV lines, pediatric and adult IO lines, treat for hypovolemic shock, and administer naloxone, D50, D25, normal saline, D5W, D10W, D15W, Narcan, Tordol, Zofran, Tylenol, aspirin, glucose, glucagon, epinephrine 1:1000, and Albuterol. This level of training is often used in rural areas where hospitals may be sparse and advanced life support intercepts or aeromedical transports can take a great deal of time. Additionally, some private ambulance companies employ advanced EMTs for interfacility transports which only require IV therapy and do not necessitate the specialized advanced care of a paramedic.

== See also ==
- Emergency medical responder levels by state
- National Registry of Emergency Medical Technicians
- National Association of Emergency Medical Technicians
- Emergency Medical Services in the United States
- Wilderness emergency medical technician
- Medic
- Combat medic
- Corpsman
- 68W
- Rescue squad
- Pararescue
