= Medic =

Person involved in medicine

Star of life

A medic is a person trained to provide medical care, encompassing a wide range of individuals involved in the diagnosis, treatment, and management of health conditions. The term can refer to fully qualified medical practitioners, such as physicians, as well as individuals in training, such as medical students. It also includes emergency medical responders, such as paramedics and combat medics, who provide urgent care in pre-hospital or battlefield settings.

== Types ==
The following individuals and positions are considered medics in many jurisdictions:

- Emergency physician – A medical doctor (MD or DO) who has undergone specialized postgraduate training in emergency medicine. These professionals work in emergency departments worldwide, providing rapid diagnosis and treatment of acute illnesses and injuries.
- Physician – Physicians, especially those involved in hospitals or urgent care, are often considered medics. In countries such as the United Kingdom, the term "medic" is often used to describe physicians who follow a non-surgical medical specialty, such as cardiology or endocrinology. These specialties are typically accredited by professional bodies like the Royal College of Physicians.
- Combat medic – A military role found in many nations, referring to trained personnel who provide frontline trauma care to injured soldiers during armed conflict. The title and specific responsibilities vary by country.
- Paramedic – A civilian emergency medical responder trained to provide advanced pre-hospital care. The role of paramedics is recognized globally, although the level of training and scope of practice may vary by country or region.
- Medical student – In both civilian and military contexts, individuals studying medicine are sometimes informally referred to as medics, particularly in countries such as the UK and Ireland.
- Search and rescue medic – In some countries, specialized medics operate in mountain rescue, wilderness rescue, or disaster response teams, trained to provide care in austere or remote environments.

== See also ==
- Advanced life support
- Basic life support
- Emergency medical service
- Medical encyclopedia
- National Association of Emergency Medical Technicians
- National Registry of Emergency Medical Technicians
- Triage
