= Emergency medical responder =

Person who provides out-of-hospital care in medical emergencies

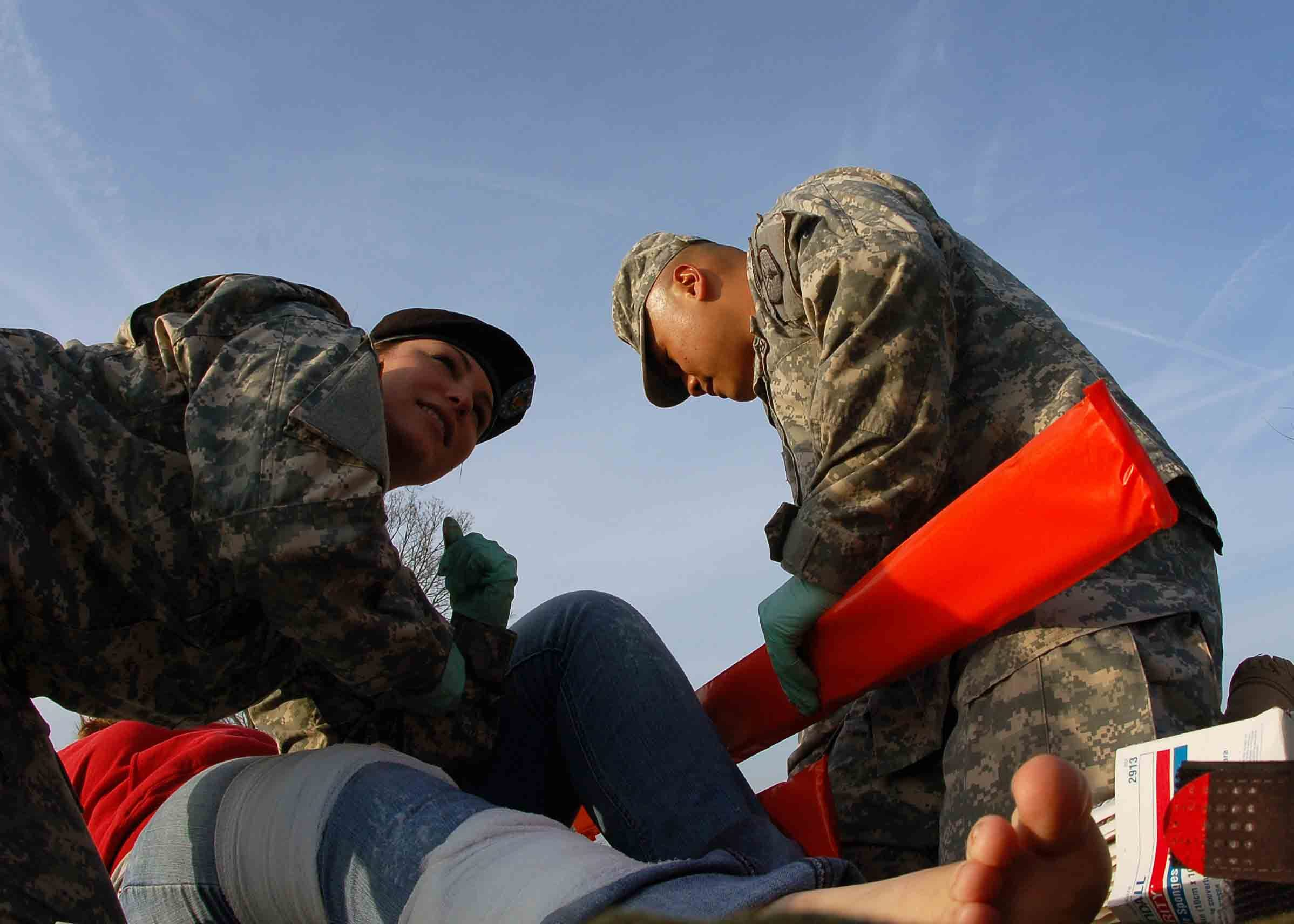
Emergency responders in the US armed forces training in how to stabilize a wounded person.

Emergency medical responders (EMRs) are people who are specially trained to provide out-of-hospital care in medical emergencies, typically before the arrival of an ambulance. Specifically used, an emergency medical responder is an EMS certification level used to describe a level of EMS provider below that of an emergency medical technician and paramedic. However, the EMR is not intended to replace the roles of such providers and their wide range of specialties.

EMRs have the knowledge and skills necessary to provide immediate lifesaving interventions while awaiting additional emergency medical services (EMS) resources to arrive, typically in rural communities or other remote environments. EMRs also provide assistance to higher-level personnel at the scene of emergencies and during ambulance transport, if needed. Broadly used, a first responder is the first medically trained personnel who comes in contact with a patient. This could be a passerby, citizen volunteer, or emergency services personnel.

== In Canada ==
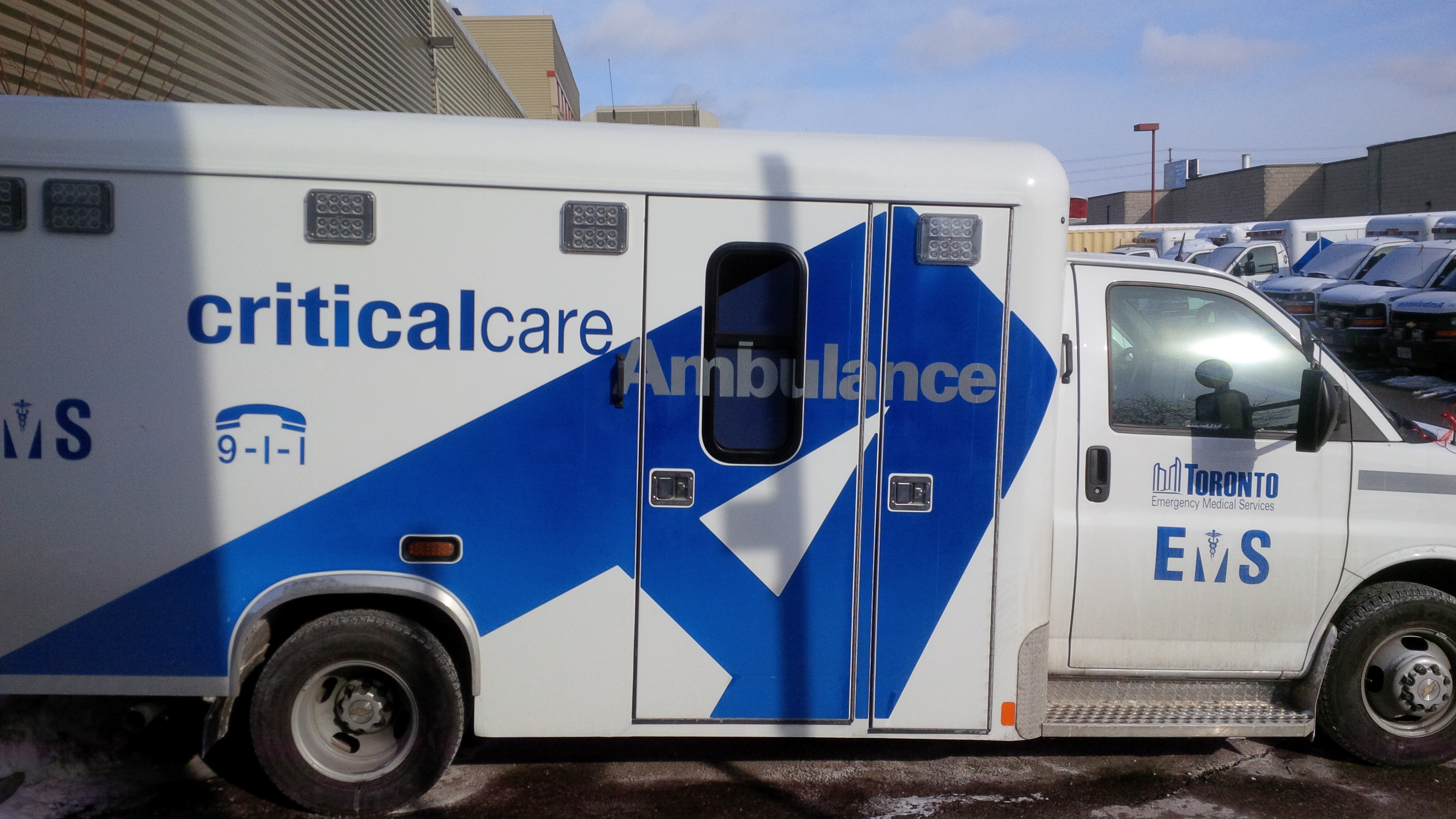
A Toronto EMS critical care paramedic

Emergency Medical Responder (EMR), Primary Care Paramedic (PCP), Advanced Care Paramedic (ACP) and Critical Care Paramedic (CCP) in Canada are the titles and levels of practitioners recognized by the National Occupational Competency Profile Paramedic Association of Canada.

Generally speaking, EMRs require 80 to 120 hours of training. PCPs, depending on province, require generally a two-year diploma of paramedicine. ACPs require an additional year of training and clinical experience totaling three years of education, and CCPs require a final year of education totaling four years of education.

Under the new NOCP, most providers that work in ambulances are identified as "Paramedics". However, in some cases, the most prevalent level of emergency prehospital care is that which is provided by EMRs. As a group, EMRs staff rural ambulance stations, community volunteer ambulance services, fire departments, police departments, industrial ambulances or mobile treatment centers. For many small communities, without this level of certification, the operation of a much-needed small community ambulance system might not be possible. EMRs across Canada contribute an important role in the chain of survival. It is a level of practice that is least comprehensive (clinically speaking), and is also generally not consistent with any medical acts beyond advanced first-aid and oxygen administration, with the possible exception of automated external defibrillation, which is still a regulated medical act in Canada, although one which is increasingly performed by members of the public under a legal exemption that allows members of the public to undertake some controlled medical acts in emergencies.

Many paramedics in Canada at all levels, are combining their diplomas of paramedicine with a bachelor's degree of paramedicine which is heading towards the standard of educational requirements in Canada. EMRs would not be eligible for these educational advances due to their limited scope of practice and education.

== In the United States ==
=== Role ===
EMRs most commonly practice in rural communities as volunteers, serving with volunteer rescue squads and fire departments. EMRs can also serve as secondary providers or drivers on ambulances with volunteer EMS services.

An EMR can be seen either as an advanced first aid provider, or as a limited provider of emergency medical care when more advanced providers have not yet arrived or are not available.

=== History ===
The U.S. Department of Transportation (DOT) recognized a gap between the typical eight hours training required for providing basic first aid (as taught by the Red Cross) and the 180 hours typical of an EMT-basic program. Also, some rural communities could not afford the comprehensive training and highly experienced instructors required for a full EMT course. The first responder training program began in 1979 as an outgrowth of the "crash injury management" course.

In 1995 the DOT issued a manual for an intermediate level of training called "first responder". This training can be completed in twenty-four to sixty hours. This training can be conducted by an EMT-basic with some field experience, which is a resource available in-house for many volunteer fire departments which do not have the resources or funds to conduct full EMT training. EMR training is intended to fill the gap between first aid and EMT.

The American Red Cross conducts a course titled "emergency medical response" that fits this definition.

In the US the term "emergency medical responder" has largely replaced the term "certified first responder" or "medical first responder" beginning in 2012.

"Emergency medical responder", or "EMR", is an EMS certification level recognized by the National Registry of Emergency Medical Technicians.

The term "emergency medical responder" is used loosely in many states, with "first responder" and "medical first responder" still being common terms.

By the year 2015, most states recognize the level of EMR.

=== Scope of practice ===
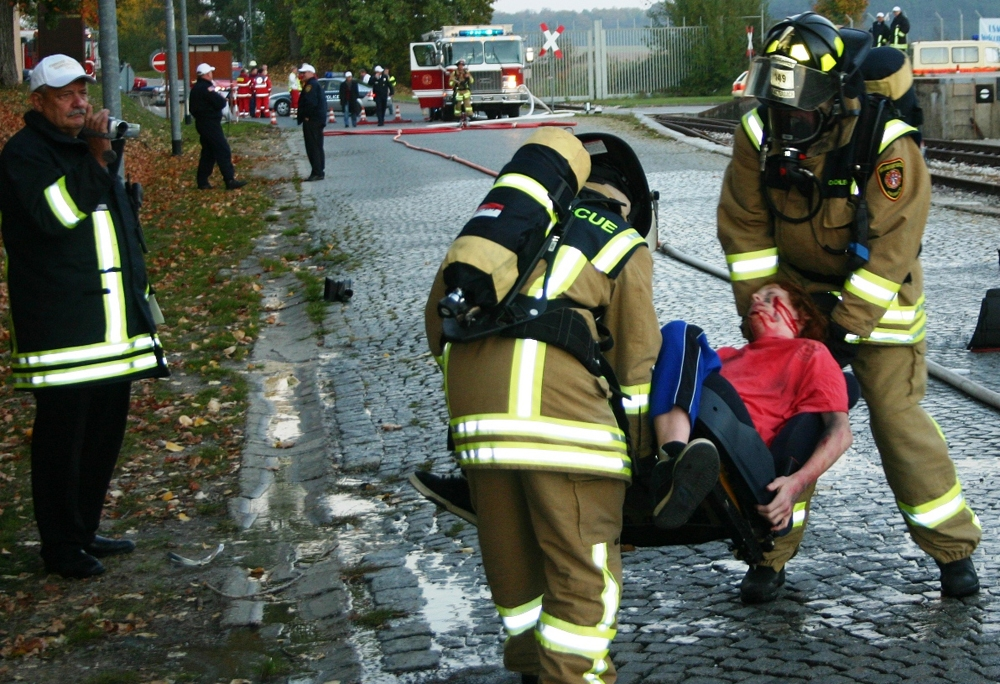
Emergency responders being tested during a training exercise

EMRs in the United States provide initial emergency care first on the scene (police, fire department, search and rescue) and support EMTs and paramedics when they arrive. The skills allowed at this level include taking vital signs, bleeding control, positive pressure ventilation with a bag valve mask, oropharyngeal airway, supplemental oxygen administration, oral suctioning, cardio-pulmonary resuscitation (CPR), use of an automated external defibrillator (AED), splinting, and assisting in the administration of basic medications such as epinephrine auto-injectors and naloxone. They are also trained in packaging, moving and transporting patients. Due to the opioid epidemic, EMRs in certain states or regions are also trained and allowed to give Naloxone and utilize supraglottic airways. Skills that EMRs are commonly not allowed to perform (that EMTs are) include insertion of administration of certain medications, traction splinting, glucometry, CPAP, or insertion of supraglottic airways. However, certain regions and states (such as Wisconsin) or medical directors may allow them to assist in or perform these skills.

=== Procedures by certification level ===
These are the minimum skills recommendations put forth by the National Highway Traffic Safety Administration and endorsed by the National Registry of Emergency Medical Technicians. Each state, region, and agencies may add to or deduct from this list as they see medically fit.

Treatment issue	Emergency medical responder
Airway and breathing	Bag valve mask; Head-tilt chin lift; Jaw thrust; Modified chin lift; Manual obstruction removal (upper airway only); Oxygen therapy via non-rebreather mask, simple O2 mask, and nasal cannula; Upper airway suctioning; Positive pressure ventilation via bag valve mask; Oropharyngeal airway
Assessment	* Manual blood pressure
Pharmacological interventions	Route of administration: Naloxone; Oral glucose; Epinephrine auto-injector; Nitroglycerin; ASA (aspirin)
Emergency trauma care	Hemorrhage control; Manual cervical stabilization; Manual extremity stabilization; Eye irrigation; Cervical collar; Direct pressure; Emergency moves for endangered patients; Tourniquet; Sager splint
Medical/cardiac care	CPR; Automated external defibrillator (AED); Assisted normal delivery (emergency childbirth)

=== Rescue ===
The National Fire Protection Association standards 1006 and 1670 state that all "rescuers" must have medical training to perform any technical rescue operation, including cutting the vehicle itself during an extrication. Therefore, in most all rescue environments, whether it is an EMS or fire department that runs the rescue, the actual rescuers who cut the vehicle and run the extrication scene or perform any rescue such as rope rescues or swift water rescue, etc., are emergency medical responders, emergency medical technicians, or paramedics, as most every rescue has a patient involved.

=== Traditional EMRs ===
EMR training is considered a bare minimum for emergency service workers who may be sent out in response to an emergency call. It is typically required as a bare minimum of medical training for firefighters, police officers and search and rescue personnel. Many EMRs have location-specific training such as water rescue or mountain rescue and must take advanced courses to be certified (i.e. lifeguard, ski patrol).

=== Other types ===
Many people who do not fall into the earlier mentioned categories seek out or receive this type of training because they are likely to be first on the scene of a medical emergency, or because they work far from medical help.

Some of these other EMRs include:

- Firefighters
- Campus police
- Lifeguards
- Ski patrollers
- Park rangers
- Event first aid staff
- Security guards
- Emergency management personnel
- HAZMAT personnel
- Community emergency response team (CERT) members
- Disaster relief personnel
- Street medics
- Athletic trainers
- SCUBA divers
- Bodyguards
- Designated industrial or corporate workers in a large facility (industrial plant or large office building) or at a remote site (oil rig, fish-packing plant, commercial vessel) (i.e. medical emergency response team (MERT) scheme)
- General aviation pilots and commercial flight attendants

== Levels of training ==
EMRs are generally trained to provide advanced first aid and basic life support. These responders may be laypeople, employees, or volunteers associated with an emergency service. Generally speaking, EMRs in the United States require 24 to 60 hours of training.

EMTs are the next level of providers. Within the United States, there are three common levels of EMS personnel, each with an increased scope of practice: EMT, advanced EMT, paramedic, and critical care paramedic. Critical care paramedics have the most training of these levels. Paramedics and critical care paramedics perform advanced life support (ALS). Advanced EMTs perform intermediate life support (ILS) or limited advanced life support (LALS). EMTs and EMRs perform basic life support (BLS).

== Remote areas ==
In the field of wilderness first aid, medical providers receive additional training relating to wilderness medicine. There are several levels of certification that parallel the aforementioned levels, which include wilderness first responder and wilderness emergency medical technician.

== See also ==
- Emergency medical services
- Emergency medical responder levels by U.S. state
