= Matt D. Talford =

American author and motivational speaker

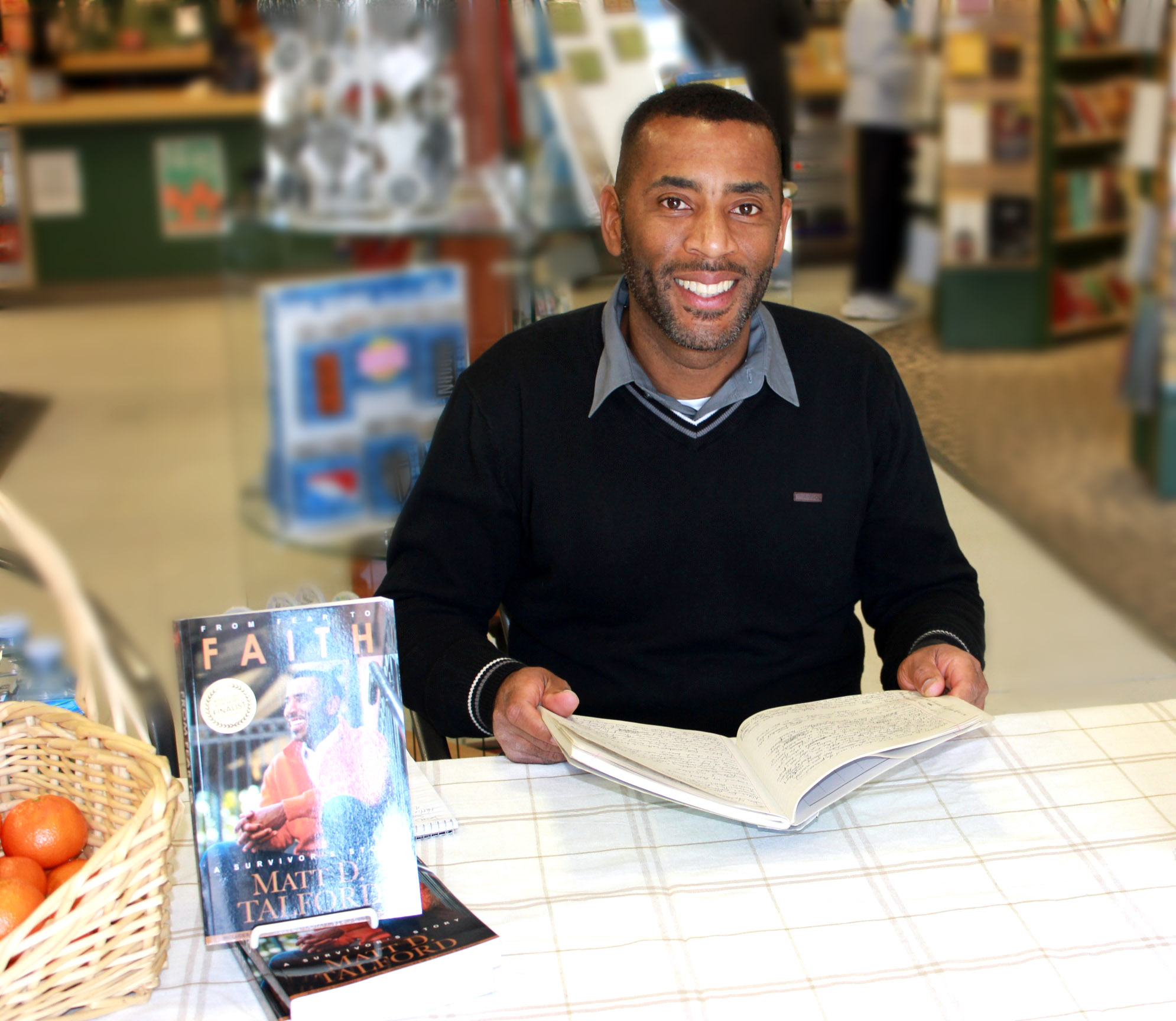
- Occupations: Novelist; journalist
- Writing career
- Period: 1998–present
- Subject: Personal development
- Notable works: From Fear to Faith: A Survivor's Story; Captain's Mate: A Practical Guide for Tennis Captains, League Players & High School Coaches; Stuck in an Elevator: A Novelette
- Notable awards: From Fear to Faith: A Survivor's Story: Canada's Book Excellence Award Winner (Best New Nonfiction) 2017; USA Book Awards Finalist (Best Nonfiction Cover Design) 2015; International Book Awards Finalist (Best New Nonfiction and Best Nonfiction Cover Design) 2015
- Website: www.mdtalford.com

Matt D. Talford is an American author and motivational speaker. He has written both non-fiction and fiction books during his tenure as an author.

== Early life ==
Talford was born in Long Island, New York and attended grade school in Long Beach, New York.

== Professional life ==
Talford served as a medic in the United States Army from 1990 to 1993. He was a member of the US Army Reserves from 1993 to 1998, and also worked as a tech in an emergency room. In 1999, he began working as a support engineer at Microsoft. From 1998 to 2004, he wrote for a local Charlotte area publication called Cultural Calendar. He is a USTA league tennis player and served as chair of the Adult Competition Committee for the United States Tennis Association (USTA) for the state of South Carolina. In 2010, he was diagnosed with a rare form of cancer. He documents in his first book From Fear to Faith: A Survivor's Story how he used his education as a medic, his experience in the ER, the technology problem solving to help him to overcome his diagnosis.

In 2017, Talford published a book entitled Captain's Mate: A Practical Guide for Tennis Captains, USTA League Players & High School Coaches, and on February 1, 2019, Talford released his first fiction work, a novelette entitled Stuck in an Elevator.

On September 22, 2025, he released a book entitled Twin Flames: Solving the "Problem" of the Avoidant/Dismissive Divine Masculine.

== Awards ==
Book title	Year	Presenter	Award	Category
From Fear to Faith: A Survivor's Story	2017	Book Excellence Awards	Winner	Best New Nonfiction
	2015	US Book Awards	Finalist	Nonfiction Cover Design
	2015	International Book Awards	Finalist	Best New Nonfiction
	2015	International Book Awards	Finalist	Non-Fiction Cover Design
Stuck in an Elevator	2019	Book Excellence Awards	Finalist	Best New Fiction
