= AEMT-CC =

Emergency medical services certification

Advanced Emergency Medical Technician - Critical Care (AEMT-CC) is a former Emergency Medical Services (EMS) certification that was unique to New York State. The curriculum for AEMT-CC's in New York was similar to that of the national standard EMT-I/99 (EMT-Intermediate - I/99) but with a broader scope of practice. EMT-CCs are fully classified as Advanced Life Support (ALS) providers within New York and are trained in advanced airway management, including intubation, IV fluid administration, cardiac monitoring, cardiac pacing, and both synchronized and unsynchronized cardioversion, and medication usage/administration in adult and pediatric patients.

In New York, AEMT-CC's are also called "Level III" providers as New York formerly recognizes four levels of Emergency Medical Technicians: EMT-Basic, Advanced EMT (AEMT), AEMT-Critical Care, and AEMT-Paramedic.

New York State will no longer approve original AEMT-CC classes beginning after January, 2018. AEMT-CC traditional refreshers will cease after August 2019. AEMT-CC may continue to refresh their certification via CME.

The Commissioner of Health rejected a proposal to sunset the CC program in 2027 during the September 2025 meeting of the State Emergency Medical Advisory Committee (SEMAC). As of this time, no official guidance has been released regarding the decision.

== Training ==
Like all ALS providers, the fundamental prerequisite is current EMT-Basic certification. Most instructors require at least one year of active experience at the EMT-Basic level. On average, students receive approximately 300-400 total hours of instruction. This instruction is broken up into 175-225 classroom and practical laboratory hours, 50-75 clinical hours and 75-100 field internship hours. At the end of the class, students must pass the state's practical skills and written exam to obtain certification. However, program requirements to obtain AEMT-CC certification vary by the institution teaching the class. While some require a set number of patient contacts rather than a set number of hours, others require tracking of individual performed skills (i.e., x number of IV sticks, x number of medication administrations), along with the tracking of patient populations (i.e., x number of pediatric patients treated, x number of adult patients, x number of geriatric patients), and call types (i.e., x number of OB/GYN patients, x number of Behavioral/Psychiatric, etc.), significantly increasing the number of clinical and field hours needed to meet the requirements to be admitted to take the state exams at the end of the class.

However, an EMT-CC's education never truly ends as continued medical education is required to maintain certification. Most agencies have a CME (Continuing Medical Education) programs where required core subjects are taught on an ongoing, usually once-a-month, basis to keep providers current. Other ways of earning required CME credits for maintaining certification include state EMS conferences, such as Vital Signs, where classes are given over the duration of a weekend.

=== Classroom ===
A wide variety of topics are covered in class with specific didactic laboratory time. These topics include:

- Foundations of the EMT-Critical Care Technician
- Overview of Human Systems/Roles and Responsibilities
- Emergency Pharmacology
- Venous Access and Medication Administration
- Airway Management And Ventilation
- Patient Assessment
  - History Taking
  - Techniques of Physical Exam
  - Clinical Decision Making
  - Communications and Documentation
- Trauma Emergencies
  - Trauma Systems and Mechanism of Injury
  - Hemorrhage and Shock
  - Burns
  - Head, Thoracic & Abdominal Trauma
  - Trauma Practical Laboratory
- Medical Emergencies
  - Respiratory Emergencies
  - Cardiovascular Emergencies
  - Diabetic Emergencies
  - Allergic Reactions
  - Poison/Overdose
  - Neurological Emergencies
  - Non Traumatic Abdominal Emergencies
  - Environmental Emergencies
  - Behavioral Emergencies
  - Gynecological Emergencies
  - Obstetrical Emergencies
  - Neonatal Resuscitation
  - Pediatrics
  - Geriatrics

=== Clinical Setting ===
A significant amount of time is spent observing and assisting health care professionals in various clinical settings such as the Emergency Department, Operating Room, Coronary Care Unit, Pediatric Intensive Care Unit, Neonatal Intensive Care Unit, Burn Unit and Medical Intensive Care Unit. The clinical time is designed to expose the student to a large volume and variety of patients in an educational setting so didactic skills and clinical knowledge can be practiced and refined.

=== Field ===
EMT-CC students participate in many EMS calls in the field that require ALS skills under an EMT-CC or Paramedic preceptor. Field clinical time represents the phase of instruction where students learn how to apply cognitive knowledge, and the skills developed in the didactic laboratories and hospital clinical time, to the EMS field environment. "Ride time" in the field usually happens in phases where the student only observes in Phase I, applies skills as directed by his preceptor in Phase II, and functions independently with oversight and input from the preceptor in Phase III. Students are generally considered "ready to function as an entry-level AEMT-CC" upon passing state practical and written exams, although individual agencies may require them to also complete in-service training and supervised probationary time once they receive their AEMT-CC card.

== Scope of Practice ==
EMT-CCs, like all EMS providers, follow a set of protocols for patient care under the guidance of a medical director. These protocols are typically listed in an algorithm format and consist of either routine standing orders or orders that require direct, on-line communication with medical control via radio or telephone. As compared to a Paramedic, an EMT-CC has fewer routine standing orders and requires more contact with medical control.

While the Advanced Life Support protocols vary slightly between the different regions in New York as to which are standing orders versus those which require on-line medical control, all protocols follow current guidelines for Advanced Cardiac Life Support (ACLS), Pediatric Advanced Life Support (PALS), Pre-hospital Trauma Life Support (PHTLS), and Basic Trauma Life Support (BTLS). Some AEMT-CC programs include both ACLS and PALS certification as part of the course of instruction. Ultimately, EMT-CC's are capable of initiating venous access, administering medications, performing endotracheal intubation, obtaining ECGs, performing electrical cardiac therapy, performing chest decompression, performing intraosseous access and comply with all state defined Basic Life Support (BLS) protocols.

Notably, the EMT-CC certification is not recognized in the City of New York. EMT-CCs operate at the Basic Life Support level in that city's 911 system.
