= National Registry of Emergency Medical Technicians =

United States EMS Certification Organization

- Formation: 1970
- Purpose: Certification of emergency medical services providers
- Headquarters: Columbus, OH
- Members: 541,928 (2024)
- Board Chair: Mike McEvoy
- Revenue: $30,932,850 (2024)
- Website: https://www.nremt.org

The National Registry of Emergency Medical Technicians (NREMT) (or colloquially as the National Registry) is a US based, non-profit, non-governmental certification organization for pre-hospital emergency medical providers that exists to ensure that emergency medical services (EMS) professionals have the knowledge and skills required for competent practice.

As an accredited national certification body, the National Registry reduces the burden of examination development for state EMS agencies. By providing a single standardized assessment, it ensures consistency across the nation, eliminating the need for multiple state-specific standards.

Through validating the knowledge, skills, and competency of EMS professionals and providing a uniform standard across states for emergency medical care, at its core, the National Registry is focused on public safety.

As the Nation’s Emergency Medical Services Certification organization, the National Registry is accredited by the National Commission for Certifying Agencies (NCCA), the accreditation body of the Institute for Credentialing Excellence. The National Registry maintains NCCA accreditation for each of the four certification programs: Emergency Medical Responder (NREMR), Emergency Medical Technician (NREMT), Advanced Emergency Medical Technician (NRAEMT), and Paramedic (NRP). Credentialing protects the public, assures consumers that professionals have met standards of practice, advances the EMS profession, and establishes standards of professional knowledge, skills, and practice.

== History ==
Established in 1970 in response to President Lyndon Johnson's Committee on Highway Traffic Safety recommendation of creating a national certification agency to set uniform standards for training and examining emergency ambulance personnel. The organization has set and maintained uniform certification and recertification requirements, actively participated in national projects, and contributed to improving EMS standards by engaging in major committees.

National Standard Curriculum as defined by the Department of Transportation - National Highway Traffic Safety Administration (NHTSA)

=== Timeline of Key Events ===
More than five decades ago, President Lyndon Johnson’s Committee on Highway Traffic Safety recommended creating a national certification agency to set uniform standards for training and examining emergency ambulance personnel. In 1966, the report Accidental Death and Disability: The Neglected Disease of Modern Society highlighted the epidemic of accidental injury, which led to the establishment of the National Registry of Emergency Medical Technicians (NREMT) in 1970.

Since its founding, the NREMT has maintained uniform certification and recertification requirements, participated in national initiatives, and contributed to improving emergency medical services (EMS) standards through national collaboration.

==== Pre-1970 ====
- 1966 – Publication of Accidental Death and Disability: The Neglected Disease of Modern Society by the National Academy of Sciences and the National Research Council, which highlighted major deficiencies in prehospital emergency care and called for national standards.
- 1969 – President Johnson’s Committee on Highway Traffic Safety recommends creation of a national certification agency. The American Medical Association Commission on EMS appoints a task force led by Oscar P. Hampton Jr., M.D., to explore formation of a national registry.

==== 1970s ====
- 1970 – The task force holds its first meeting to draft bylaws and address governance and funding. The group becomes the NREMT Board of Directors, with Roddy A. Brandes elected as first Chair.
- 1971 – Rocco V. Morando is appointed founding Executive Director. The first national EMT-Ambulance examination is administered to 1,520 candidates at 51 test sites.
- 1973 – The first recertification of a Nationally Registered EMT is processed.
- 1974 – NREMT convenes national experts to develop guidelines for the emerging paramedic curriculum.
- 1975 – Continuing education requirements established for EMT-Ambulance and EMT-Non-Ambulance personnel. NREMT assists in founding the National Association of Emergency Medical Technicians (NAEMT).
- 1978 – First NREMT-Paramedic examination administered in Minneapolis, Minnesota. NREMT joins the National Commission for Health Certifying Agencies (now the Institute for Credentialing Excellence).

==== 1980s ====
- 1981 – The NREMT dedicates its new headquarters in Columbus, Ohio.
- 1986 – The United States Department of Defense issues Directive 6000.10 requiring EMT-Ambulance certification for military technicians.
- 1988 – Executive Director Rocco V. Morando retires; the headquarters building is renamed the Rocco V. Morando Building.
- 1989 – William E. Brown Jr. becomes the second Executive Director. The new EMT-Basic category combines previous EMT-Ambulance and EMT-Non-Ambulance levels.

==== 1990s ====
- 1996 – NREMT contributes to the EMS Agenda for the Future project led by the National Highway Traffic Safety Administration (NHTSA) and the National Association of State EMS Officials (NASEMSO).
- 1998 – Launch of the Longitudinal EMT Attributes and Demographics Study (LEADS).
- 1999 – Adoption of NREMT’s first mission statement: “To certify and register EMS professionals throughout their careers by a valid and uniform process to assess the knowledge and skills for competent practice.”

==== 2000s ====
- 2003 – All five NREMT certification programs receive accreditation from the National Commission for Certifying Agencies (NCCA).
- 2007 – Transition to computer-based testing using computer-adaptive testing (CAT), improving efficiency and test security.
- 2009 – Online recertification system implemented and new practice-analysis study completed.

==== 2010s ====
- 2010 – A record 140,686 candidates complete NREMT examinations. NASEMSO formally recognizes NREMT as the national EMS certification body.
- 2013 – Executive Director William E. Brown Jr. retires; Severo Rodriguez becomes third Executive Director.
- 2017 – Georgia becomes the tenth state to join the Interstate Commission for EMS Personnel Practice through the United States EMS Compact.
- 2018 – Bill Seifarth becomes fifth Executive Director; the number of certified EMS clinicians surpasses 400,000.

==== 2020s ====
- 2020 – NREMT celebrates 50 years of national certification and launches the National EMS ID system modeled after the National Provider Identifier. Temporary provisions introduced to support EMS clinicians during the COVID-19 pandemic.
- 2023 – Certification holders exceed 500,000; scaled score reporting introduced for all cognitive examinations.
- 2024 – Updated Advanced EMT and Paramedic examinations released following the discontinuation of ALS psychomotor testing. All 50 U.S. states recognize NREMT certification as an accepted pathway for EMS clinicians.

== Scope of Practice ==
The scope of medical practice for EMTs is regulated by state law, and can vary significantly both among states as well as inside states. In general, EMTs provide what is considered basic life support (BLS) and are limited to essentially non-invasive procedures. Besides employing basic medical assessment skills, typical procedures provided by EMTs include CPR, automated external defibrillation, mechanical ventilation using a bag valve mask, placement of air way adjuncts such as oropharyngeal and nasopharyngeal airways, pulse oximetry, glucose testing using a glucometer, splinting (including spinal immobilization and traction splints), and suctioning. In addition, EMT-Bs are trained to assist patients with administration of certain prescribed medications, including nitroglycerin, metered-dose inhaler such as albuterol, and epinephrine auto injectors such as the EpiPen. EMT-Bs can typically also administer certain non-preprescribed drugs including oxygen, oral glucose, and activated charcoal (usually upon medical direction). In response to the opioid overdose epidemic, states are rapidly changing protocols to permit EMT-Bs to administer naloxone as well.

Individually, each state is free to add or subtract to their EMTs scope of practice. For example, EMTs working in California may not administer activated charcoal, an NHTSA approved intervention, under a standard certification. Local emergency medical services (EMS) systems (i.e. counties in California) can apply to the state to implement an extended scope of practice for EMTs that includes activated charcoal as well as other pharmaceutical interventions not normally allowed to be administered by EMTs.

== Standards ==
All fifty (50) states officially recognize the National Registry as an accepted pathway for EMS certification. The National Registry maintains four (4) certification programs: emergency medical responder (EMR), emergency medical technician (EMT), advanced emergency medical technician (AEMT), and paramedic (some states may have additional certifications). National Registry certification at an EMT Intermediate level may or may not be sufficient for some state EMT-I requirements. While National Registry certification may be mandatory for new state certification, it is not necessarily required for renewals. These procedures and requirements vary from state to state. In 1986, military emergency rooms were required to certify all medical technicians through the National Registry.

== Education and Training ==
EMT training is regulated at both the state and federal level. At the federal level, the National Highway Traffic Safety Administration (NHTSA) has developed a minimum content and hour curriculum, but it is not binding on the states. This is known as the National Standard Curriculum. Under the NHTSA curriculum, students receive 110 hours of lecture and lab time covering anatomy, physiology, legal aspects of medical care, assessment, and treatment of medical, trauma, behavioral, and obstetric emergencies. In addition to class time, the NHTSA recommends clinical rotations on board ambulances and in emergency departments.

Using NHTSA guidelines, the National Registry has developed and implemented certification tests for the NHTSA EMT levels, including the EMT level. As of 2024, 50 US states recognize the National Registry as an accepted pathway for EMS certification.

Once certified, Clinicians are required to obtain continuing education hours to recertify. Recertification requirements vary from state to state. Continuing education courses can cover a variety of topics, provided that they cover relevant material, including college courses covering anatomy, physiology, or psychology, to more applied courses that are either standardized, such as a Prehospital Trauma Life Support (PHTLS), or tailored to the needs of an individual EMS system or region.

Some states allow for an already certified Clinician from another state to apply for reciprocity in their state. The states that participate in this can be found by contacting the certification boards of each state or on their websites.

Levels of Certification
Certification	Abbreviaion	Scope of Practice and Education	Course Length	Seal
Emergency Medical Responder	NREMR	CPR, AED, and basic first aid. Typically reserved for non-ambulance emergency personnel, such as police officers, firefighters, and park rangers.	40-60 hours	
Emergency Medical Technician	NREMT	Basic life support, including basic trauma care (such as spinal immobilization and traction splints), basic medications such as aspirin, epinephrine, and albuterol, and basic airway management. Considered to be the minimum level of certification in most jurisdictions to operate an ambulance. Certification as an EMR is not required to begin an EMT class.	120-160 hours	
Advanced Emergency Medical Technician	NRAEMT	Introductory advanced life support care (intravenous/intraosseous access, pain management, and advanced medications. AEMT students must already be certified as an EMT before beginning their program.	120-200 hours	
Paramedic	NRP	Advanced life support, including EKG monitoring, intubation and advanced airway management, cardioversion, transcutaneous pacing, and specialized medications. Paramedic students must be certified as an EMT, and occasionally as an AEMT in some jurisdictions, before beginning their program.	1,200-2,000 hours (varies)	

== EMS-ID ==
The National Registry launched the EMS-ID system on January 23, 2020, modeled after the National Provider Identifier (NPI). The idea was that one identifier could be issued to a verified individual upon creation of a National Registry account, which could then reference all certifications for that person. The number would remain constant, even if the individual changed their name, national certification level, etc. Similar to the NPI number issued by the Centers for Medicare and Medicaid Services (CMS), the number is a 12-position, intelligence-free numeric identifier (12-digit number). The EMS-ID is not intended to replace the individual registry number.

== Controversy ==
In 2010, accusations ultimately determined to be false were made against National Registry claiming failure to prevent cheating during some of their certification examinations (administered by Pearson VUE). The Washington, D.C. Fire Department was investigated for cheating on the National Registry certification examination; however, an extensive investigation by the National Registry and Pearson VUE, with assistance from the DC Fire and EMS department as well as the DC police, revealed no evidence of cheating at Pearson VUE's LaPlata, MD testing center. Per the report, “… that all scores reported on DCFEMS members were valid.”

The National Registry works with the EMS community to implement the National EMS System including the EMS Agenda for the Future, EMS Education Agenda: A Systems Approach, and National Scope of Practice Model.

== See also ==
- Ambulance
- Combat Medic
- Emergency Medical Responder levels by state
- Emergency Medical Services
- Emergency Medical Services in the United States
- Emergency Medical Technician
- Emergency Medical Technician – intermediate
- Paramedic
- Medic
- National Association of Emergency Medical Technicians (National Registry)
- National Registry Emergency Medical Technician
- Rescue Squad
- Star of Life
- Wilderness Emergency Medical Technician
