= Intermediate Life Support =

Intermediate Life Support (ILS) is a level of training undertaken in order to provide emergency medical care outside medical facilities (prehospital care). ILS is classed as mid-level emergency medical care provided by trained first responders who receive more training than basic life support providers (EMT-Basics, Basic First Responders and First-aid providers (depending on country)), but less than advanced life support providers (such as Paramedics, Nurses and Doctors). Intermediate Life Support is also known as Immediate Life Support (ILS), Limited Advanced Life Support (LALS), Immediate Life Support, or Intermediate Advanced Life Support (IALS).

== Description ==
ILS contains skills and protocols from advanced life support. In the US, the level of training is comparable with Emergency medical technician – intermediate (EMT-I), Emergency Medical Technician II or Advanced Emergency Medical Technicians (depending on state). Intermediate Life Support was first used in the US in 1985, and is now used around the world.

ILS can be used for transporting and non-transporting EMS.

It can be run as a separate course for professionals and volunteers, or as addition to Advanced Life Support for people without training in prehospital care. Because its scope of practice, ILS can be an addition at the clinical skills for doctors, medical students, nurses, nursing students, midwives, healthcare providers such as physiotherapists, dentists and ambulance technicians. It may also be suitable for fire service technicians, police personnel and prison officers.

It provides the knowledge and skills to:

- identify the causes of cardiopulmonary arrest;
- recognise and treat the deteriorating patient using the ABCDE approach;
- undertake CPR and defibrillation (manual and /or AED) and simple airway manoeuvres;
- utilize non-technical skills to coordinate team members

Improving the quality of fast first response is the main goal of intermediate life support.

== Scope of practice ==
Intermediate life support providers are called Medicals, Advanced Medicals, EMT II, EMT-Intermediate, or Advanced Emergency Medical Technicians (depending on country and state). Mostly the Medicals and Advanced Medicals work as a Medical team. They both had the same training, but the Advanced Medical is allowed to provide the advanced medical skills. Advanced Medicals work on a daily base as nurses, anesthesiologist-assistants, medical students, paramedics, or physician assistants.

Providing a wide range of medical skills and treatment at scene allows the Medical Team to provide better medical care to their patients than regular first aid. Without the Advanced Medical at scene, the Medicals still can provide a wide range of medical care. Medicals can immobilize fractures of the extremities, stabilize the cervical spine and monitor vital signs as oxygenation (SpO_{2}), pulse, blood pressure, glucose, and consciousness. They are also trained to administer oxygen, oral glucose, ipratropium/salbutamol inhalation, fentanyl intranasal spray, valium klysma and paracetamol oral. The scope of practice of the Intermediate Life Support trained Medicals is comparable with the EMTs known in the US. No needles are required in treatment.

When an Advanced Medical is on scene, it increases the abilities to provide a wider range of emergency medical care. The Advanced life support protocols are partly integrated in the intermediate life support. Cardiac arrests and anaphylactic shock treatments can be provided in the same way as Advanced Life Support and Ambulance protocols subscribe. That means also that bag-mask ventilation and inserting an intermediate airway device (iGel or other supraglottic airway device) can be performed if the Advanced Medical has been properly trained. They also start intravenous access and administer medication in case of cardiac arrest, anaphylactic shock or hypoglycemia.

== Sources ==
- American Heart Association Guidelines
- Ambulancezorg Nederland
- National Registry of Emergency Medical Technicians (NREMT)
- UptoDate Medical Database
