= Pre-Hospital Emergency Care Council =

Irish statutory organisation

- Formation: 2000
- Legal status: Active
- Headquarters: Naas, County Kildare, Ireland
- Region served: Ireland
- Director: Richard Lodge
- Website: Official website
- Remarks: Appointment: Minister for Health

The Pre-Hospital Emergency Care Council (PHECC) is an independent statutory organisation responsible for implementing, monitoring and further developing the standards of care provided by all statutory, private and voluntary ambulance services in Ireland. It is also responsible for conducting examinations at six levels of pre-hospital care, the control of ambulance practitioner registration and the publication of clinical practice guidelines.

== Formation ==
The council was established on 10 April 2000 by order of the Minister for Health.

== Levels of Care ==
There are six skill levels obtainable. They are divided into responder and practitioner categories. As of September 2019, all practitioners working on an emergency ambulance must be trained to a minimum of paramedic, however in 2021 this minimum requirement was temporarily waived allowing an EMT to crew with a paramedic or advanced paramedic for the remainder of the COVID-19 era. A practitioner working on a non-emergency transport or intermediate care vehicle must be at least an emergency medical technician.

=== Responders ===
Practitioner licence card at EMT grade

Responder training is aimed towards workplace response, Gardaí, fire service personnel, military personnel, voluntary first aid organisations, sports clubs and security services. Voluntary first aid services such as Civil Defence, Order of Malta Ambulance Corps, Irish Red Cross and the St John Ambulance Brigade of Ireland avail of responder training to allow their members provide on-site first aid at the various events they cover. Certain remote communities have set up their own individual Cardiac First Response programmes, where various people in the area are trained to PHECC Level 1 (CFR) standard and are provided with an Automated External Defibrillator. These responders can then be called or paged to the scene of a cardiac arrest to provide CPR and defibrillation, where the increased response time of an ambulance would greatly affect the patient's outcome.

PHECC RESPONDER levels (basic life support (BLS))
Responder title	Abbreviation	Level of care
Cardiac first responder	CFR	A one-day course where you are trained in basic life support with emphasis on CPR and the use of an automated external defibrillator.
Cardiac first responder (Advanced)	CFR-A	A one-day course including CFR, with additional scope including the use of a bag valve mask (BVM) and supraglottic airway management, pulse checks and oxygen administration. CFR-A is also the minimum standard for entry into the Emergency First Responder (EFR) program. This is mandatory for all PHECC registered practitioners to keep their practitioner level and should always be kept in date (2 years).
First aid responder	FAR	A three-day course including CFR, with additional training in patient assessment, common medical emergencies, injury management and shock, burns, hyper and hypothermia as well as trauma related injuries such as the management of bleeding and fractures, etc. This course is the new standard for first aid in the workplace.
Emergency First Responder	EFR	A five-day course including the FAR course, with additional first aid and basic life support training that includes anatomy, physiology, pharmacology, cardiovascular emergencies, general medical emergencies, musculoskeletal head and spinal injuries, pediatrics and childbirth, oxygen therapy . An EFR may also assist in the giving of Nitroglycerin as a medication.
Basic Tactical Emergency Care	B-TEC	The B-TEC course is a one-day tactical course available to EFR's, EMT's and paramedics to provide medical interventions in hostile environments. This includes the use of nasopharyngeal airways, haemostatic agents and tourniquets.

=== Practitioners ===
Practitioners must maintain their place on the register annually in order to practice. Once registered, practitioners are governed by a code of conduct, care principles, regulations and various laws, (primarily tort law) when engaging with the public. As a result, practitioners are subject to professional accountability in terms of their professional practice and actions. Upon qualification and registration, a practitioner is issued with an identification number and licence card. The practitioner's PIN must be entered on all patient care records for any incident where the practitioner had contact with a patient. It is the responsibility of the licence holder to maintain an ongoing, predetermined standard of competency.

PHECC PRACTITIONER levels
Practitioner title	Abbreviation	Level of care
Emergency Medical Technician	EMT	Entry-level EMS healthcare professional, with 120 hours of classroom training followed by 40 hours clinical placement. A state-level exam needs to be completed before you are invited to register as an EMT. EMT's in Ireland do not practice on frontline emergency ambulances. Instead, they provide intermediate care. EMT's are trained in basic life support, anatomy/physiology, pathophysiology, pharmacology, ECG monitoring, advanced airway management (supraglottic airways), spinal immobilization and the administration of medication typically oral, intramuscular, inhaled, nebulised or sublingual.
Paramedic	P	This is the minimum standard for an emergency ambulance in Ireland. Paramedics are trained in additional training in advanced pharmacology, anatomy, advanced airway management (supraglottic airways), some advanced life support skills, 12 leads ECG's, administration of medication typically oral, intramuscular, inhaled, nebulised or sublingual and they are also allowed to maintain IV lines. Paramedic training in Ireland is a minimum of 2 years (including internship). In 2019, the rollout of a bachelor's degree began, which is to become the standard of education for a paramedic in Ireland.
Advanced Paramedic	AP	Trained to Paramedic level plus extensive advanced pharmacology, anatomy, physiology, Intravenous cannulation and intraosseous infusion access, a wide range of medications, tracheal intubation, manual defibrillation, etc. In 2019, the rollout of a master's degree began, which is to become the standard of education for an advanced paramedic in Ireland.

== CPG Approved Service Providers ==
All organisations and companies who are providing an ambulance service in any capacity must register with PHECC as a CPG Approved Service Provider to work to the current edition of Clinical Practice Guidelines published by PHECC. Approved Service Providers are broken down into four categories. 3rd Edition CPG Providers are the Irish Defence Forces and Event Medical Services Ltd. 3rd Edition CPG Providers are listed on the PHECC website and updated regularly.

== Citizen CPR campaign ==
In 2010, PHECC launched a poster-advertising and television-ad campaign aimed at informing the general public of what to do if they should witness an adult suddenly collapse. Its focus was to emphasise the fact that CPR can still be effective without mouth-to-mouth contact. Pocket-sized cards were distributed with instructions on the steps to take:

1. Check: check if the person is unresponsive and not breathing.
2. Call: Get someone to call 999 or 112 or call them yourself.
3. Compress: Push hard and fast in the centre of the chest. Don't stop until help arrives.

== Red Card ==
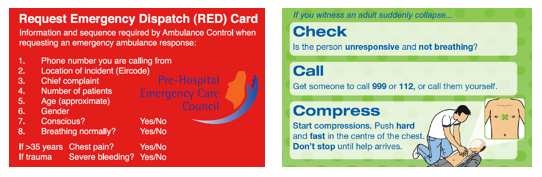
Red card used by first responders

The Red Card has been developed by PHECC to help responders prepare prior to calling an ambulance. The card will prompt appropriate information from the Garda Síochána and Fire Service personnel on-scene who require an emergency ambulance to attend.

== See also ==
- Health Service Executive
- HSE National Ambulance Service
- Dublin Fire Brigade
- Civil Defence Ireland
- Order of Malta Ambulance Corps
- St John Ambulance Ireland
- Irish Red Cross
