= Emergency medical technician =

Professional that provides emergency medical services

Emergency Medical Technician
- The Star of Life, a global symbol of emergency medical service.

Occupation
- Names: Emergency medical technician
- Synonyms: EMT
- Occupation type: Profession
- Activity sectors: Emergency services Healthcare

Description
- Fields of employment: Ambulance; hospital; pre-hospital; transport
- Related jobs: Paramedic; Emergency Medical Responder

An emergency medical technician (EMT) is a medical professional that provides emergency medical services (EMS). EMTs are most commonly found serving on ambulances and in fire departments in the US and Canada, as some departments require their firefighters to be EMT certified.

EMTs are often employed by public ambulance services, municipal EMS agencies, governments, hospitals, and fire departments. Some EMTs are paid employees, while others (particularly those in rural areas) are volunteers. EMTs provide medical care, primarily basic life support, under a set of protocols which are typically written by a physician.

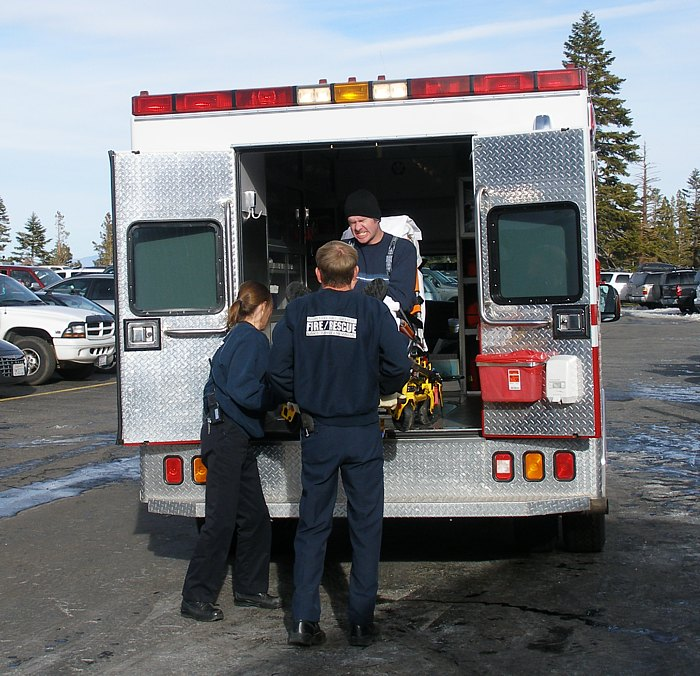
EMTs loading an injured skier into an ambulance

EMTs often work alongside other EMS professionals such as paramedics, who receive additional training and are granted a greater scope of practice.

== Hazard controls ==
EMTs are exposed to a variety of hazards such as lifting patients and equipment, treating those with infectious disease, handling hazardous substances, and transportation via ground or air vehicles. Employers can prevent occupational illness or injury by providing safe patient handling equipment, implementing a training program to educate EMTs on job hazards and proper body-substance-isolation (BSI) protocol, and supplying PPE such as respirators, gloves, and isolation gowns when dealing with biological hazards.

Infectious disease has become a major concern in light of the COVID-19 pandemic. In response, the U.S. Centers for Disease Control and Prevention and other agencies and organizations have issued guidance regarding workplace hazard controls for COVID-19. Some specific recommendations include modified call queries, symptom screening, universal PPE use, hand hygiene, physical distancing, and stringent disinfection protocols. Research on ambulance ventilation systems found that aerosols often recirculate throughout the compartment, creating a health hazard for EMTs when transporting sick patients capable of airborne transmission. Unidirectional airflow design can better protect workers.

== Canada ==
There is considerable degree of inter-provincial variation in the Canadian paramedic practice. Although a national consensus (by way of the National Occupational Competency Profile) identifies certain knowledge, skills, and abilities as being most synonymous with a given level of paramedic practice, each province retains ultimate authority in legislating the actual administration and delivery of emergency medical services within its own borders. For this reason, any discussion of paramedic practice in Canada is necessarily broad, and general. Specific regulatory frameworks and questions related to paramedic practices can only definitively be answered by consulting relevant provincial legislation, although provincial paramedic associations may often offer a simpler overview of this topic when it is restricted to a province-by-province basis.

In Canada, the levels of paramedic practice as defined by the National Occupational Competency Profile are: emergency medical responder (EMR), primary care paramedic, advanced care paramedic, and critical care paramedic.

Regulatory frameworks vary from province to province, and include direct government regulation (such as Ontario's method of credentialing its practitioners with the title of A-EMCA, or advanced emergency medical care assistant) to professional self-regulating bodies, such as the Alberta College of Paramedics. In Alberta, for instance, only someone registered with the Alberta College of Paramedics can call themselves a paramedic; the title is legally protected. Almost all provinces have moved to adopting the new titles, or have at least recognized the NOCP document as a benchmarking document to permit inter-provincial labour mobility of practitioners, regardless of how titles are specifically regulated within their own provincial systems. In this manner, the confusing myriad of titles and occupational descriptions can at least be discussed using a common language for comparison sake.

=== Emergency medical responder ===
Most providers that work in ambulances are identified as "paramedics" by the public. However, in many cases, the most prevalent level of emergency pre-hospital care is that which is provided by an emergency medical responder (EMR). This is a level of practice recognized under the National Occupational Competency Profile, although unlike the next three successive levels of practice, the high number of EMRs across Canada cannot be ignored as contributing a critical role in the chain of survival, although it is a level of practice that is least comprehensive (clinically speaking), and is also generally not consistent with any medical acts beyond advanced first-aid and oxygen therapy, administration of ASA, I.M. epinephrine and glucagon, oral glucose and administration of intranasal Narcan with the exception of automated external defibrillation (which is still considered a regulated medical act in most provinces in Canada).

=== Primary care paramedic ===
Primary care paramedics (PCP) are the entry-level of paramedic practice in Canadian provinces. The scope of practice includes performing semi-automated external defibrillation, interpretation of 4-lead ECGs, administration of symptom relief medications for a variety of emergency medical conditions (these include oxygen, epinephrine, dextrose, glucagon, salbutamol, ASA and nitroglycerine), performing trauma immobilization (including cervical immobilization), and other fundamental basic medical care. Primary care paramedics may also receive additional training in order to perform certain skills that are normally in the scope of practice of advanced care paramedics. This is regulated both provincially (by statute) and locally (by the medical director), and ordinarily entails an aspect of medical oversight by a specific body or group of physicians. This is often referred to as "medical control", or a role played by a base hospital. For example, in the provinces of Ontario, Quebec and Newfoundland and Labrador, many paramedic services allow primary care paramedics to perform 12-lead ECG interpretation, or initiate intravenous therapy to deliver a few additional medications.

=== Advanced care paramedic ===
Advanced care paramedic (ACP) is a level of practitioner that is in high demand by many services across Canada. However, Quebec only uses this level of practice in a very limited fashion as part of a pilot program in Montreal. The ACP typically carries approximately 20 different medications, although the number and type of medications may vary substantially from region to region. ACPs perform advanced airway management including intubation, surgical airways, intravenous therapy, place external jugular IV lines, perform needle thoracotomy, perform and interpret 12-lead ECGs, perform synchronized and chemical cardioversion, transcutaneous pacing, perform obstetrical assessments, and provide pharmacological pain relief for various conditions. Several sites in Canada have adopted pre-hospital fibrinolytics and rapid sequence induction, and prehospital medical research has permitted a great number of variations in the scope of practice for ACPs. Current programs include providing ACPs with discretionary direct 24-hour access to PCI labs, bypassing the emergency department, and representing a fundamental change in both the way that patients with S-T segment elevation myocardial infarctions (STEMI) are treated, but also profoundly affecting survival rates, as well as bypassing closer hospitals to get an identified stroke patient to a stroke centre.

=== Critical care paramedic ===
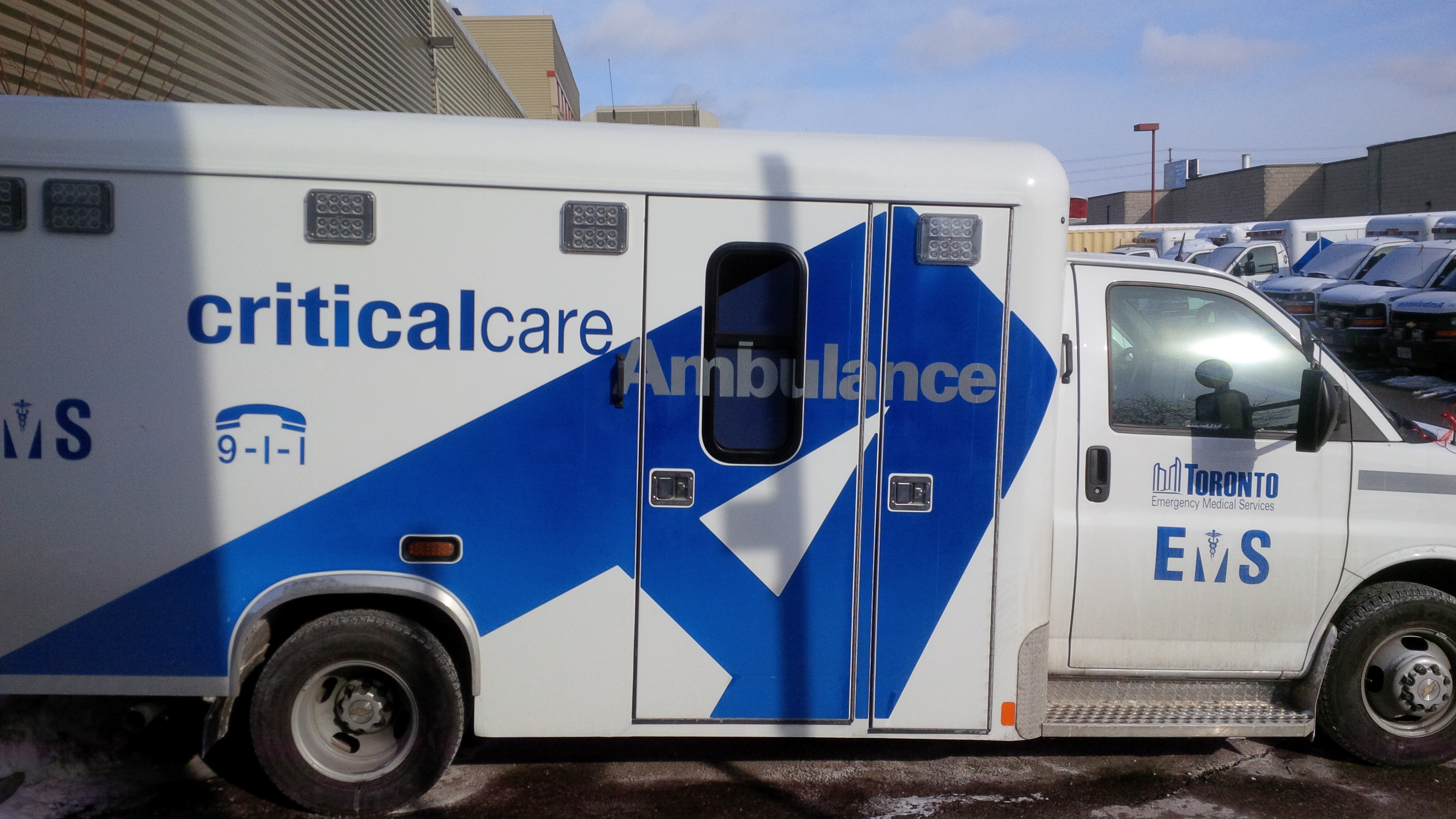
A Toronto critical care ambulance

Critical care paramedics (CCPs) are paramedics who generally do not respond to 9-1-1 emergency calls, with the exception of helicopter "scene" calls. Instead they focus on transferring patients from the hospital they are currently in to other hospitals that can provide a higher level of care. CCPs often work in collaboration with registered nurses and respiratory therapists during hospital transfers. This ensures continuity of care. However, when acuity is manageable by a CCP or a registered nurse or respiratory therapist is not available, CCPs will work alone. Providing this care to the patient allows the sending hospital to avoid losing highly trained staff on hospital transfers.

CCPs are able to provide all of the care that PCPs and ACPs provide. That being said, CCPs significantly lack practical experience with advanced skills such as IV initiation, peripheral access to cardiovascular system for fluid and drug administration, advanced airway, and many other techniques. While a PCP and ACP may run 40–50 medical codes per year, a CCP may run 1–2 in an entire career. IV/IO starts are nearly non-existent in the field and for this reason CCPs are required to attend nearly double the amount of time in classroom situations or in hospital to keep current. In addition to this, they are trained for other skills such as medication infusion pumps, mechanical ventilation, and arterial line monitoring.

CCPs often work in fixed and rotary wing aircraft when the weather permits and staff are available, but systems such as the Toronto EMS Critical Care Transport Program work in land ambulances. ORNGE transport operates both land and aircraft in Ontario. In British Columbia, CCPs work primarily in aircraft with a dedicated critical care transport crew in Trail for long-distance transfers and a regular CCP street crew stationed in South Vancouver that often also performs medevacs when necessary.

=== Training ===
Paramedic training in Canada varies regionally; for example, the length of training may be eight months in British Columbia or two to four years in Ontario, Alberta, and Quebec. The nature of training and how it is regulated, like actual paramedic practice, varies from province to province.

== Ireland ==
Emergency medical technician (EMT), paramedic (P) and advanced paramedic (AP) are legally defined and protected titles in Ireland based on the standard set down by the Pre-Hospital Emergency Care Council (PHECC). Emergency medical technician is the entry-level standard of practitioner for employment within the ambulance service. Currently, EMTs are authorized to work on non-emergency ambulances only as the standard for emergency (999) calls is a minimum of a two-paramedic crew, although this minimum requirement was relaxed to and EMT - paramedic crew during the COVID-19 crisis. EMTs are a vital part of the private, voluntary and auxiliary services where a practitioner must be on board any ambulance in the process of transporting a patient to hospital.

PHECC responder levels (basic life support (BLS))
Responder title	Abbreviation	Level of care
Cardiac first responder	CFR	A one-day course including training in basic life support with emphasis on CPR and the use of an automated external defibrillator.
Cardiac first responder (advanced)	CFR-A	A one-day course including CFR, with additional scope including the use of a bag valve mask (BVM) and supraglottic airway management, pulse checks and oxygen administration. CFR-A is also the minimum standard for entry into the Emergency First Responder Program. This is mandatory for all PHECC registered practitioners to keep their practitioner level and should always be kept in date (two years).
First aid responder	FAR	A three-day course including CFR, with additional training in patient assessment, common medical emergencies, injury management and shock, burns, hyper and hypothermia as well as trauma related injuries such as the management of bleeding and fractures, etc. This course is the new standard for first aid in the workplace.
Emergency first responder	EFR	A five-day course including the FAR course, with additional first aid and basic life support training that includes anatomy, physiology, pharmacology, cardiovascular emergencies, general medical emergencies, musculoskeletal head and spinal injuries, pediatrics and childbirth, oxygen therapy. An EFR may also assist in the giving of nitroglycerin as a medication.
Basic tactical emergency care	B-TEC	The B-TEC course is a tactical course available to EFRs, EMTs and paramedics to provide medical interventions in hostile environments. This includes the use of nasopharyngeal airways, haemostatic agents and tourniquets.

PHECC practitioner levels (ALS)
Practitioner title	Abbreviation	Level of care
Emergency medical technician	EMT	Entry-level EMS healthcare professional, with 120 hours of classroom training followed by 40 hours clinical placement. A state-level exam needs to be completed before an invitation to register as an EMT. EMT's are trained in basic life support, anatomy-physiology, pathophysiology, pharmacology, ECG monitoring, advanced airway management (supraglottic airways), spinal immobilization and the administration of medication typically oral, intramuscular, inhaled, nebulised or sublingual.
Paramedic	P	This is the minimum standard for an emergency ambulance in the Republic of Ireland. Whilst paramedics in Ireland do work on front-line ambulances the PHECC standards for are generally lower than most of the world leaders in pre-hospital care. Paramedics are trained to the EMT standard and additional training in advanced pharmacology, anatomy, advanced airway management (supraglottic airways), some advanced life support skills, 12-leads ECGs, administration of medication typically oral, intramuscular, inhaled, nebulised or sublingual, and they are also allowed to maintain IV lines.
Advanced paramedic	AP	Trained to paramedic level plus extensive advanced pharmacology, anatomy, physiology, Intravenous cannulation and intraosseous infusion access, a wide range of medications, tracheal intubation, manual defibrillation, etc.

== Philippines ==
Emergency medical technician (EMT), paramedic (P) and advanced paramedic (AP) are legally defined and protected titles in the Philippines based on the standard set down by the Department of Health.

== Spain ==
Técnico en Emergencias Sanitarias (TES) are trained a total of 2000hrs in 2 years with 3 months of internship in ambulances at the very end. It's the only level of EMS worker. BLS ambulances can be driven with a B license, ALS with a C1. ALS ambulances also carry an Emergency Physician and an Emergency Nurse.

== United Kingdom ==
Emergency medical technician is a term that has existed for many years in the United Kingdom, but has no single defined scope. They may be known as emergency medical technician or simply, ambulance technician. Most EMTs hold an Institute for Healthcare Development Ambulance Technician Certificate and are employed in private ambulance companies or in National Health Service ambulance trusts.

As of 2016, The IHCD Ambulance Technician Certificate was replaced with the FAQ Level 4 Diploma for Associate Ambulance Practitioners & QA Level 5 Diploma in First Response Emergency and Urgent Care (RQF) This provided a defined scope of practice agreed nationally by ambulance service trusts. Their role title, however, may still be defined by their employer as emergency medical technician.

They can work autonomously, making their own clinical decisions within their training and remit. They may also work as a clinical lead working alongside an emergency care assistant or as assistants themselves to a paramedic.

As the role does not have a single defined scope, the skills they have can include:

- Administration of select general sales list, pharmacy and prescription only medicines under provision of the Human Medicines Regulations 2012
- Administration of medicines by select parenteral or non-parenteral routes; typically oral, intramuscular, inhaled, nebulised or sublingual
- Intermediate life support, including manual defibrillation and supraglottic airway placement
- Ability to discharge patients to different care pathways

The term emergency medical technician is not commonly used by members of the public in the United Kingdom. Instead, it is common for all ambulance personnel to be referred to as "paramedics", although the paramedic title is protected under registration of the Health and Care Professions Council.

== United States ==
=== Certification ===
In the United States, EMTs are certified according to their level of training. Individual states set their own standards of certification (or licensure, in some cases) and all EMT training must meet the minimum requirements as set by the National Highway Traffic Safety Administration's (NHTSA's) standards for curriculum. The National Registry of Emergency Medical Technicians (NREMT) is a nonprofit organization which offers certification exams based on NHTSA education guidelines and has been around since the 1970s. Currently, NREMT exams are used by 46 states as the sole basis for certification at one or more EMT certification levels. A NREMT exam consists of skills and patient assessments as well as a written portion.

On June 12, 2019, the NREMT changed the rules regarding age limits for EMTs, AEMTs, and paramedics. There is no longer an age limit for registered personnel. However, applicants must successfully complete a state-approved EMT course that meets or exceeds the NREMT standards within the past two years of applying. Those applying for the NREMT certification must also complete a state-approved EMT psychomotor exam. It is possible for the candidate to be refused access to a state-approved course due to their age within the state.

=== Levels ===
NHTSA recognizes four levels of certification:

- Emergency medical responder (EMR)
- Emergency medical technician (EMT)
- Advanced emergency medical technician (AEMT)
- Paramedic

Some states also recognize the advanced practice paramedic or critical care paramedic level as a state-specific licensure above that of paramedic. These critical care paramedics generally perform high acuity transports that require skills outside the scope of a standard paramedic (such as mechanical ventilation and management of cardiac assist devices). In addition, EMTs can seek out specialty certifications such as wilderness EMT, wilderness paramedic, tactical EMT, and flight paramedic.

In 2009, the NREMT posted information about a transition to a new system of levels for emergency care providers developed by NHTSA with the National EMS Scope of Practice Project. By 2014, these new levels replaced the fragmented system found around the United States. The new classification includes emergency medical responder (replacing first responder), emergency medical technician (replacing EMT-basic), advanced emergency medical technician (replacing EMT-intermediate/85), and paramedic (replacing EMT-intermediate/99 and EMT-paramedic). Education requirements in transitioning to the new levels are substantially similar.

==== Emergency Medical Responder (EMR) ====
EMR is the most basic level of training, and is considered the bare minimum certification for rescuers that respond to medical emergencies. EMRs are typically on-call volunteers in rural communities, or are primarily employed as firefighters or search and rescue personnel. EMRs typically arrive quickly and assess and stabilize the patient before the transporting ambulance arrives, and then assist the crew with patient care and packaging.

EMRs provide advanced first aid-level care, CPR, semi-automatic defibrillation, basic airway management (suction/oropharyngeal airway), oxygen therapy, and administration of basic, life-saving medications such as epinephrine and naloxone.

==== Emergency Medical Technician (EMT) ====
EMT is the next level of EMS certification and is considered the most common entry level of training. The procedures and skills allowed at this level include bleeding control, management of burns, splinting of suspected fractures and spinal injuries, childbirth, cardiopulmonary resuscitation, semi-automatic defibrillation, oral suctioning, insertion of oropharyngeal and nasopharyngeal airways, pulse oximetry, blood glucose monitoring, auscultation of lung sounds, and administration of a limited set of medications (including oxygen, epinephrine, dextrose, naloxone, albuterol, ipratropium bromide, glucagon, nitroglycerin, nitrous oxide, and acetylsalicylic acid). Some areas may add to the scope of practice, including intravenous access, insertion of supraglottic airway devices, and CPAP. Training requirements and treatment protocols vary from area to area.

==== Advanced EMT ====
Advanced EMT is the level of training between EMT and paramedic. They can provide intermediate life support (ILS) care including obtaining intravenous or intraosseous access, basic cardiac monitoring, fluid resuscitation, capnography, and administration of some additional medications.

==== Paramedic ====
Paramedics typically represent the highest degree of pre-hospital medical provider, providing advanced life support (ALS) care. Paramedics perform a variety of medical procedures such as endotracheal intubation, rapid sequence induction, cricothyrotomy, fluid resuscitation, drug administration, obtaining intravenous and intraosseous access, manual defibrillation, electrocardiogram interpretation, capnography, cardioversion, transcutaneous pacing, pericardiocentesis, thoracostomy, ultrasonography, and blood chemistry interpretation.

=== Staffing levels ===
An ambulance with only EMTs is considered a basic life support (BLS) unit, an ambulance using AEMTs is dubbed an "intermediate life support" (ILS), or "limited advanced life support" (LALS) unit, and an ambulance with paramedics is dubbed an "advanced life support" (ALS) unit. Many states allow ambulance crews to contain a mix of crews levels (e.g. an EMT and a paramedic or an AEMT and a paramedic) to staff ambulances and operate at the level of the highest trained provider. There is nothing stopping supplemental crew members to be of a certain certification, though (e.g. if an ALS ambulance is required to have two paramedics, then it is acceptable to have two paramedics and an EMT). An emergency vehicle with only EMRs or a combination of both EMRs and EMTs is still dubbed a "basic life support" (BLS) unit. An EMR must usually be overseen by an EMT-level provider or higher to work on a transporting ambulance.

=== Education and training ===
EMT training programs for certification vary greatly from course to course, provided that each course at least meets local and national requirements. In the United States, EMRs receive at least 40–80 hours of classroom training and EMTs receive at least 120–300 hours of classroom training. AEMTs generally have 100–300 hours of additional classroom training beyond the standard EMT training. Paramedics are trained for 1,500–2,500 hours or more.

In addition to each level's didactic education, clinical rotations are typically also required. Similar in a sense to medical school clinical rotations, EMT students are required to spend a required amount of time in an ambulance and on a variety of hospital services (e.g. obstetrics, emergency medicine, surgery, intensive care unit, psychiatry) in order to complete a course and become eligible for the certification and licensure exams.

The number of clinical hours for both time in an ambulance and time in the hospital vary depending on local requirements, the level the student is obtaining, and the amount of time it takes the student to show competency.

In addition, a minimum of continuing education (CE) hours is required to maintain certification. For example, to maintain NREMT certification, EMTs must obtain at least 48 hours of additional education and either complete a 24-hour refresher course or complete an additional 24 hours of CE that cover, on an hour by hour basis, the same topics as the refresher course would. Recertification for other levels follows a similar pattern.

EMT training programs vary greatly in calendar length (number of days or months). For example, fast track programs are available for EMTs that are completed in two weeks by holding class for 8 to 12 hours a day for at least two weeks. Other training programs are months long, or up to two years for paramedics in associate degree programs. EMT training programs take place at numerous locations, such as universities, community colleges, technical schools, hospitals or EMS academies. Every state in the United States has an EMS lead agency or state office of emergency medical services that regulates and accredits EMT training programs. Most of these offices have web sites to provide information to the public and individuals who are interested in becoming an EMT.

=== Medical direction ===
In the United States, an EMT's actions in the field are governed by state regulations, local regulations, and by the policies of their EMS organization. The development of these policies are guided by a physician medical director, often with the advice of a medical advisory committee composed of paramedics and other health professionals.

In California, for example, each county's local emergency medical service agency (LEMSA) issues a list of standard operating procedures or protocols, under the supervision of the California Emergency Medical Services Authority. These procedures often vary from county to county based on local needs, levels of training and clinical experiences. New York State has similar procedures, whereas a regional medical-advisory council (REMAC) determines protocols for one or more counties in a geographical section of the state.

Treatments and procedures administered by paramedics fall under one of two categories, off-line medical orders (standing orders) and on-line medical orders. On-line medical orders refers to procedures that must be explicitly approved by a base hospital physician or registered nurse through voice communication (generally by phone or radio) and are generally rare or high risk procedures (e.g. vasopressor initiation). In addition, when multiple levels can perform the same procedure (e.g. AEMT-critical care and paramedics in New York), a procedure can be both an on-line and a standing order depending on the level of the provider. Since no set of protocols can cover every patient situation, many systems work with protocols as guidelines. Systems also have policies in place to handle medical direction when communication failures happen or in disaster situations. The NHTSA curriculum is the foundation Standard of Care for EMS providers in the US.

=== Employment ===
EMTs and paramedics are employed in varied settings, mainly the prehospital environment such as in EMS, fire, and police agencies. They can also be found in positions ranging from hospital and health care settings, to industrial and entertainment positions. The prehospital environment is loosely divided into non-emergency (e.g. patient transport) and emergency (9-1-1 calls) services, but many ambulance services and EMS agencies operate both non-emergency and emergency care.

In many places across the United States, the primary employer of EMRs, EMTs, and paramedics is often a fire department, with the fire department providing the primary emergency medical system response including "first responder" fire apparatus, as well as ambulances. In other locations, emergency medical services are provided by a separate, or "third-party", municipal government emergency agency (e.g. Boston EMS, Austin-Travis County EMS). In still other locations, emergency medical services are provided by volunteer agencies. College and university campuses may provide emergency medical responses on their own campus using students.

In some areas of the US, EMS agencies are run by independent non-profit volunteer first aid squads that are their own corporations set up as separate entities from fire departments. In this environment, volunteers are hired to fill certain blocks of time to cover emergency calls. These volunteers have the same state certification as their paid counterparts.

Private ambulance companies like AMR, Acadian Ambulance, and Falck also offer employment for EMT-Bs, AEMTs, and paramedics. Smaller private companies may focus on niche segments, like event medicine staffing or wildfire medical support.

== See also ==
- Combat medic
- List of EMS provider credentials
