= National Association of Emergency Medical Technicians =

Emergency medical services professional association

- Abbreviation: NAEMT
- Formation: 1975; 51 years ago
- Type: Professional association
- Tax ID no.: 04-2576267
- Legal status: 501(c)(6)
- Headquarters: Clinton, Mississippi, U.S.
- Coordinates: 32.350835°N 90.327016°W
- Members: 90,313 (15,777 Full Members) (2022)
- President: Susan Bailey
- Executive Director: Pamela Lane
- Revenue: $3,380,244 (2021)
- Expenses: $2,760,951 (2021)
- Employees: 7 (2021)
- Website: www.naemt.org

The National Association of Emergency Medical Technicians is an American professional association representing emergency medical technicians and paramedics.

== Lobbying ==
In March 2013, the association unsuccessfully lobbied for the Veteran Emergency Medical Technician Support Act of 2013, which would have amended the Public Health Service Act.
