= Basic life support =

Emergency medical care by first responder

Basic life support (BLS) is a level of medical care which is used for patients with life-threatening condition of cardiac arrest until they can be given full medical care by advanced life support providers (paramedics, certain nurses and physicians, or any trained general personnel). It can be provided by trained medical personnel, such as emergency medical technicians, qualified bystanders and anybody who is trained for providing basic and/or advanced life support.

== Background ==
The International Liaison Committee on Resuscitation (ILCOR) was formed in 1992 to coordinate the efforts of resuscitation worldwide. The ILCOR representatives come from various countries such as the United States, Canada, Australia, New Zealand, and from the European, Asian, and African continents. In 2000, the committee published the first resuscitation guideline. In 2005, the committee published International Consensus on Cardiopulmonary resuscitation (CPR) and Emergency Cardiovascular Care (ECC) Science with Treatment Recommendations. Since 2010, the committee has provided materials for regional resuscitation providers such as European Resuscitation Council and American Heart Association to write their own guidelines. Since 2015, ILCOR has used a new methodology called Consensus on Science with Treatment Recommendations (COSTR) to evaluate the quality of latest evidence available and to reach a conclusion on the best treatments available in resuscitation. Using the COSTR methodology, ILCOR also started to conduct yearly reviews and published updates on the latest evidence in resuscitation, changing it from the previous 5-yearly review on resuscitation.

CPR provided in the field increases the time available for higher medical responders to arrive and provide ALS care. An important advance in providing BLS is the availability of the automated external defibrillator or AED. This improves survival outcomes in cardiac arrest cases.

== Method ==
=== D - Danger ===
One of the first checks done in emergency response is to assess the situation for any danger. If the person does not remove themselves or others from the danger then they are liable to become a patient and require emergency assistance themselves or become unable to render assistance for the other patient. Some examples of dangerous situations which should cease before BLS is administered are electrocutions, assault, drowning, and burns.

=== R - Response ===
Checking for response is the next step in emergency situations as continuing with other forceful methods of BLS could exacerbate the patient's condition and can be seen as assault. AVPU (Alert, Verbal, Pain, Unconscious) is the commonly used acronym for quickly assessing the level of consciousness in a patient. Pain stimulus in particular should be used with caution as many methods if done incorrectly can leave bruises (sternal rub for example). Commonly used methods for central stimulus are the trapezius squeeze and for peripheral stimulus it is squeezing the side of the finger.

=== S - Send for help ===
Sending for help allows much more assistance to be rendered upon the patient and increases their chances of receiving ALS.

=== A - Airway ===
Opening of the airway via the jaw-thrust maneuver is the preferred method as the head-tilt maneuver is thought to be more risky for people with suspected spinal injury. If the person is in danger of pulmonary aspiration, then they should be placed in the recovery position, or more advanced airway management should be used.

=== B - Breathing ===
Once the airway has been opened, checking for breathing should begin, if the respiratory rate is below 12-20 breaths per minute then reassess for responsiveness and pulse, however if the patient is breathing normally then the rescuer should place them in the recovery position and summon an ambulance.

=== C - CPR ===
Cardiopulmonary resuscitation (CPR) is an emergency procedure used during cardiac or respiratory arrest that involves chest compressions, often combined with artificial ventilation, to preserve brain function and maintain circulation until spontaneous breathing and heartbeat can be restored. It is recommended for those who are unresponsive with no breathing or abnormal breathing, for example, agonal respirations.

CPR involves chest compressions for adults between 5 cm (2.0 in) and 6 cm (2.4 in) deep and at a rate of at least 100 to 120 per minute. The rescuer may also provide artificial ventilation by either exhaling air into the subject's mouth or nose (mouth-to-mouth resuscitation) or using a device that pushes air into the subject's lungs (mechanical ventilation). Current recommendations emphasize early and high-quality chest compressions over artificial ventilation; a simplified CPR method involving only chest compressions is recommended for untrained rescuers. With children, however, 2015 American Heart Association guidelines indicate that doing only compressions may result in worse outcomes, because such problems in children normally arise from respiratory issues rather than from cardiac ones, given their young age. Chest compression to breathing ratios are set at 30 to 2 in adults.

CPR alone is unlikely to restart the heart. Its main purpose is to restore the partial flow of oxygenated blood to the brain and heart. The objective is to delay tissue death and to extend the brief window of opportunity for a successful resuscitation without permanent brain damage. Administration of an electric shock to the subject's heart, termed defibrillation, is usually needed to restore a viable, or "perfusing", heart rhythm. Defibrillation is effective only for certain heart rhythms, namely ventricular fibrillation or pulseless ventricular tachycardia, rather than asystole or pulseless electrical activity, which usually requires the treatment of underlying conditions to restore cardiac function. Early shock, when appropriate, is recommended. CPR may succeed in inducing a heart rhythm that may be shockable. In general, CPR is continued until the person has a return of spontaneous circulation (ROSC) or is declared dead.

Welsh Government training video of how to perform CPR on a person in cardiac arrest.

=== D - Defibrillation ===
Once an automated external defibrillator (AED) has been acquired, it should be immediately applied to the patient and allowed to analyze the heart rhythm. The rescuer should follow the AED's prompts. Depending on whether or not the AED detects a shockable cardic arrest rhythm, the rescuer may or may not be prompted to deliver a shock; in either case, the rescuer will be directed to begin another round of CPR. AEDs will usually notify the rescuer of any impediments to continued CPR (such as a sinus rhythm), in which case the rescuer may be prompted to stop CPR.

== Indications ==
=== Cardiac arrest ===
Cardiac arrest occurs when the heart stops pumping in a regular rhythm. In this situation, early defibrillation is the key to returning the patient's heart back to a normal rhythm. When a defibrillator is not readily available, a rescuer or bystander should keep the blood flowing by performing chest compressions and rescue breaths at an age-appropriate rate until it is.

=== Respiratory arrest ===
Respiratory arrest is when there is no measurable breathing in a patient. It tends to occur in conjunction with cardiac arrest, but this is not always the case. Respiratory arrest is the most common indication of BLS in infants and toddlers. The most critical factor in restoring breathing in the patient is to provide high quality rescue breaths.

=== Shock ===
Shock, also known as Inadequate Tissue Perfusion, is a life-threatening condition that occurs as a result of the disruption to 3 major components of the cardiovascular system: Heart Function, Blood Vessel Function, and Blood Volume. Perfusion describes the process of adequate blood flow to the organs, where the waste and reactants that are involved in cellular respiration are removed or transported throughout the 3 parts of the cardiovascular system for metabolism to be processed effectively. However, if one part were to fail, important resources for cellular respiration such as oxygen would not be able to reach the organs that needs it function. In an attempt to compensate, the body diverts blood to organs that cannot tolerate the lack of blood, such as the heart and the brain, resulting in widespread vasoconstriction, or thinning of the blood vessels. Consequently, blood is prevented from reaching organs that can tolerate the lack of perfusion, or hypoperfusion, in organs such as the skin, resulting in the typical presentation of pale and clammy skin conditions during shock. Moreover, disruptions may present specifically to each component or multiple systems may be affected at the same time, which generally results in the four categories of shock: Cardiogenic, Obstructive, Distributive, and Hypovolemic. Typically, shock progresses through the compensated, decompensated, and irreversible stages.

=== Drowning ===
In cases of drowning, rescuers should provide CPR as soon as an unresponsive patient is removed from the water. In particular, rescue breathing is important in this situation. A lone rescuer is typically advised to give CPR for a short time before leaving the patient to call emergency medical services. Since the primary cause of cardiac arrest and death in drowning and choking patients is hypoxemia, it is recommended to start with rescue breaths before proceeding to chest compressions (if pulseless). If the patient presents in a shockable rhythm, early defibrillation is still recommended.

=== Choking ===
Choking occurs when a foreign body obstructs the trachea. Rescuers should only intervene in patients who show signs of severe airway obstruction, such as a silent cough, cyanosis, or inability to speak or breathe. If a patient is coughing forcefully, rescuers should not interfere with this process and encourage the patient to keep coughing. According to the 2025 American Heart Association's adult guidelines, rescuers should alternate five back blows with five abdominal thrusts for adults severely choking. The rescuer should continue until the object comes out or the person becomes unresponsive. Once unresponsive, the rescuer should perform CPR and remove any foreign object visible in the airway. Blind finger sweeps should not be performed because of its riskiness. Observational data suggest that when no object is visible, the risk of a blind finger sweep worsening the obstruction outweighs any potential benefit.

== Technique ==
=== United States ===
Basic Life Support is provided by emergency medical technicians (EMTs) prehospitally in the United Status. In the context of emergency medicine, EMTs are the highest level of certification limited to BLS; advanced clinicians, such as paramedics and emergency physicians, utilize Advanced Cardiac Life Support (ACLS) protocols in addition to BLS protocols.

BLS for Healthcare Providers Course

According to the American Heart Association, in order to be certified in BLS, a student must take an online or in-person course. However, an online BLS course must be followed with an in-person skills session in order to obtain a certification issued by the American Heart Association.

Chain of Survival

The American Heart Association highlights the most important steps of BLS in a "five-link chain of survival." The chain of survival includes early recognition of an ongoing emergency, early initiation of CPR by a bystander, early use of a defibrillator, and early advanced life support once more qualified medical help arrives. Qualified bystanders with training in BLS are encouraged to perform the first three steps of the five-link chain of survival.

High Quality CPR

High quality cardiopulmonary resuscitation (CPR) and early defibrillation using an automated external defibrillator (AED) are the most important aspects of BLS to ensure a patient survives. CPR involves a rescuer or bystander providing chest compressions to a patient in a supine position while also giving rescue breaths. The rescuer or bystander can also choose not to provide breaths and provide compression-only CPR. Depending on the age and circumstances of the patient, there can be variations in the compression to breath ratio given.

=== Europe ===
European Resuscitation Council

According to 2015 guidelines published by European resuscitation council, early initiation of resuscitation and coordination of lay people with medical personnel on helping an unconscious person is very helpful in increasing the chance of survival of the patient. When a person is unconscious and is not breathing normally, emergency services should be alerted and cardiopulmonary resuscitation (CPR) and mouth-to-mouth resuscitation (rescue breaths) should be initiated. High quality CPR is important. An adequate ratio of high quality chest compressions and rescue breaths are crucial. An automated external defibrillator (AED) machine is essential during resuscitation. Defibrillation during the first 3 to 5 minutes during resuscitation can produce survival rates as high as 50 to 70%. Placing AEDs in public places where there is one cardiac arrest in five years is cost-effective. Although the adult CPR sequence can be safely used in children, a modified sequence of basic life support that entails less forceful chest compression is even more suitable in children.

United Kingdom

Adult BLS guidelines in the United Kingdom were published in 2015 by the Resuscitation Council (UK), based on the 2015 International Consensus on Cardiopulmonary Resuscitation and Emergency Cardiovascular Care Science with Treatment Recommendations (CoSTR) published in November 2005. The newest guidelines for adult BLS allow a rescuer to diagnose cardiac arrest if the patient is unresponsive and not breathing normally. The guidelines also changed the duration of rescue breaths and the placement of the hand on the chest when performing chest compressions. These changes were introduced to simplify the algorithm, to allow for faster decision making and to maximize the time spent giving chest compressions; this is because interruptions in chest compressions have been shown to reduce the chance of survival. It is also acknowledged that rescuers may either be unable, or unwilling, to give effective rescue breaths; in this situation, continuing chest compressions alone is advised, although this is only effective for about 5 minutes. For choking, the guidelines in the United Kingdom first call for assessing the severity of the situation. If the patient is able to speak and cough effectively, the obstruction is mild. If the patient is unable to speak or cough effectively, or is unable to breathe or is breathing with a wheezy sound, the airway obstruction is severe. It is then recommended to perform back blows until the obstruction clears. If the patient becomes unresponsive, CPR is started.

=== Other countries ===
The term BLS is also used in some non-English speaking countries (e.g. in Italy) for the education of first responders. Terms with similar meanings for similar skill sets are also common.

- Spain: SVB (soporte vital básico)
- Belgium: aide médicale urgente ("emergency medical assistance")/ EHBO (eerste hulp bij ongelukken, "first aid")
- Brazil: SBV (Suporte básico de vida)
- France: PSE 1 & PSE 2 (Premiers Secours en Equipe niveaux 1 & 2), "First Aid as part of a team", level 2 includes stretchering and teamwork, (former CFAPSE before 2007 Certificat de Formation aux Activités des Premiers Secours en Equipe, "Training certificate for first aid teamwork")
- Poland: Podstawowe zabiegi resuscytacyjne/ KPP (Kwalifikowana pierwsza pomoc)
- Portugal: SBV (Suporte Básico de Vida)
- Germany: Lebensrettende Sofortmaßnahmen (basic life support)
- Romania: SVB (support vital de bază)
- Netherlands: BLS ("first aid" is referred to as EHBO (Eerste hulp bij ongelukken))
- Turkey: TYD (temel yaşam desteği, "basic life support")

== Special populations ==
When performing BLS, laypeople and medical personnel are encouraged to remember that some groups of people have certain conditions that need to be taken into considerations.

=== Pregnant women ===
To relieve choking, chest thrusts should be used instead of abdominal thrusts when the patient is in late pregnancy.

=== Obese people ===
If a patient of choking is obese and a rescuer cannot perform adequate abdominal thrusts, they are encouraged to instead perform chest thrusts.

=== Infants ===
The American Heart Association’s 2025 CPR guidelines changed the hand placement for CPR for infants. Infant guidance refers to children younger than one year but excludes newborns. Cardiac arrest in infants is usually the result of respiratory failure or shock instead of a primary heart problem. Outside the hospital, giving rescue breaths along with chest compressions improves the likelihood of the infant surviving. The guidelines removed the two-finger technique because it does not compress the chest enough. Rescuers instead use both thumbs or the heel of one hand. The guidelines state that it is reasonable to compress the chest about four centimeters, or at least one third of the infant’s front-to-back depth. They state that a rate of 100 to 120 compressions per minute is reasonable. Infants with severe choking should receive five back blows alternating with five chest thrusts. Performing abdominal thrusts on an infant risks injuring the infant’s organs. A 2025 study in Scientific Reports states that the American Heart Association’s 2020 guidelines placed the compression site for infants just below the line between the nipples. The study’s authors state that finding the lower half of the breastbone is challenging in infants. They note that the nipple line has been proposed as a reliable landmark.

=== Children ===
The American Heart Association’s 2025 CPR guidelines changed the process for children choking. Child guidance refers to children from one year up until puberty. The American Heart Association’s recommended compression site for children was based on studies from the 1980s to 2000. A 2025 study in Scientific Reports used ultrasound to locate the heart in children. The heart sat higher in the chest when the children breathed out than when they breathed in. The authors concluded that the best compression site for children receiving CPR without rescue breaths may be higher on the chest than current guidelines recommend. The guidelines state that it is reasonable to compress a child’s chest about five centimeters. If the child is choking severely, rescuers should perform five back blows and five abdominal thrusts. Management of severe choking in children now starts with back blows instead of abdominal thrusts. If the child becomes unresponsive then the rescuer should perform CPR with chest compressions.
