= Emergency medical personnel in the United Kingdom =

People engaged in the provision of emergency medical services

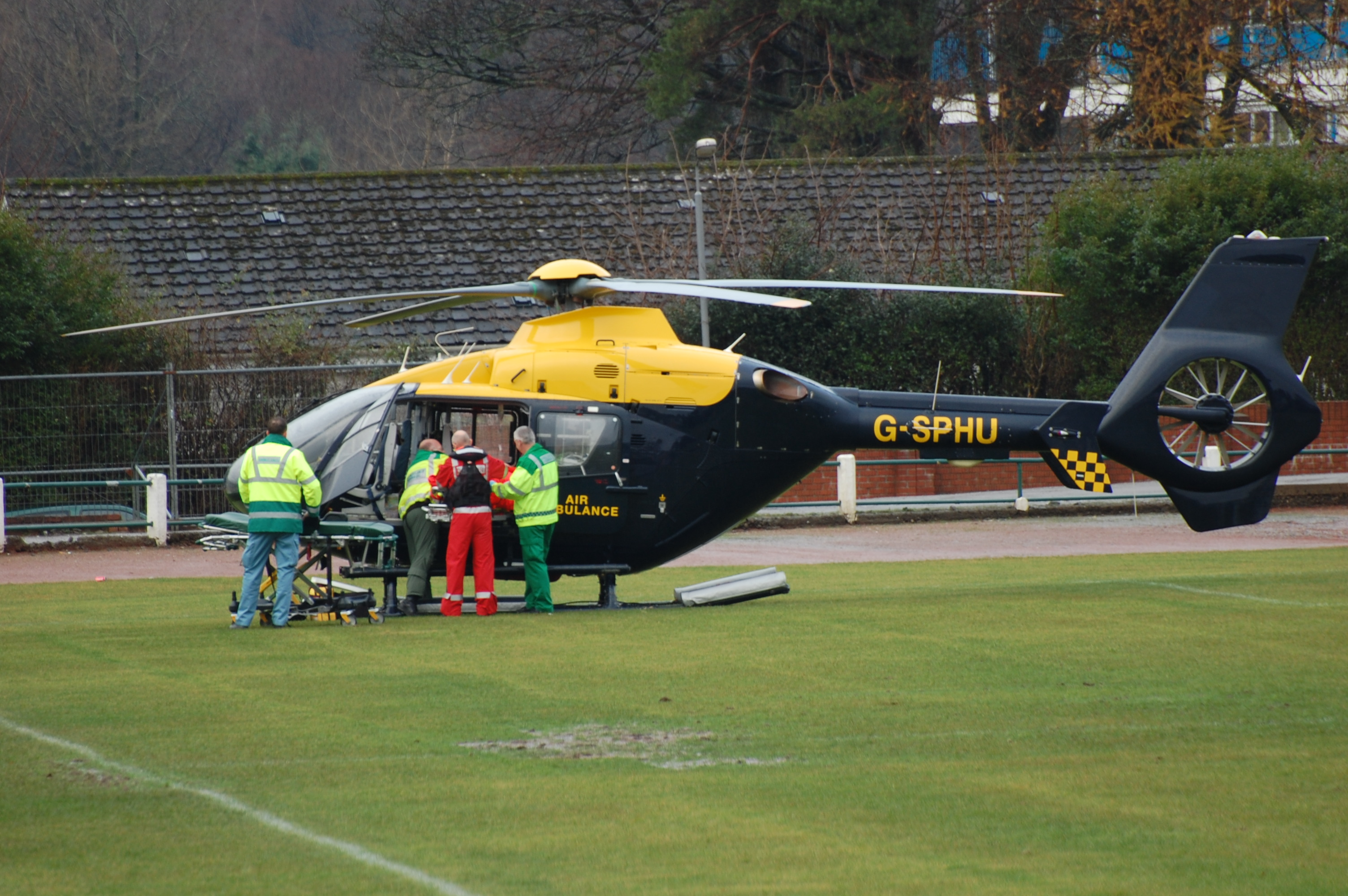
Emergency medical personnel (green uniforms) and Ambulance care assistants (Blue uniforms) help to load a patient into an air ambulance at Dunoon Stadium. Air ambulance staff are in red flight suits.

Emergency medical personnel in the United Kingdom are people engaged in the provision of emergency medical services. This includes paramedics, emergency medical technicians and emergency care assistants. 'Paramedic' is a protected title, strictly regulated by the Health and Care Professions Council, although there is tendency for the public to use this term when referring to any member of ambulance staff.

Emergency medical personnel most often work in an ambulance alongside another member of staff. Typically, an ambulance will be crewed by either a paramedic with another crew member (technician or emergency care assistant), two technicians or a technician with an emergency support worker.

The majority of emergency medical personnel are employed by the public ambulance services of the National Health Service and respond to emergency calls generated by the 999 system. Many are also employed by a growing number of private ambulance companies and voluntary aid societies such as the British Red Cross and St. John Ambulance, who provide services such as event medical cover or support to some NHS ambulance services in times of need or under contract.

Many NHS trusts are in the process of phasing out the ambulance technician / emergency medical technician (Band 5 on the Agenda for Change) role from the services and replacing it with the emergency care support worker or emergency care assistant roles (Band 3 on the Agenda for Change), and most services are no longer training staff at technician level.

All ambulance services (in England), whether public, private or voluntary, are regulated by the Care Quality Commission, who dictate the expected standard of care.

== History ==
=== The 1966 Millar Report ===
Prior to 1966, the training provided to ambulance attendants was variable. Each county ran their service differently; where some had dedicated ambulance services, some were under the aegis of the fire, police, or transport departments, and some were contracted out to parties such as St John Ambulance or the British Red Cross. In most places, the maximum training an attendant would have was a first aid certificate. In 1966, the Ministry of Health produced "A Report by the Working Party on Ambulance Training and Equipment", better known as 'The Millar Report'. Part 1 established the 'Ambulance Services Proficiency Certificate', which included training in first aid, anatomy and physiology, basic oxygen administration and suction of airways, resuscitation, splinting and handling, and operational matters. Also offered was the 'Ambulance Services Advanced Proficiency Certificate', which led the attendant to become an 'extended-care attendant' or 'Millar-Trained'. It included training on conditions of breathing and circulation, artificial airways, ventilators, control of circulation and blood pressure, surgical emergencies, and nervous system conditions. The attendant then had to complete a minimum of 20 hours practical experience in a hospital. Completion was signified by a badge worn on the sleeve of the attendant's clothing.

Those hoping to achieve Millar-Trained status joined the Association of Emergency Medical Technicians. This was an organisation run by members to promote and train Paramedics. The AEMT was supported by BASICS and large numbers of hospital doctors. Training took place at various locations with members attending off-duty and at their own expense. Trainees followed a wide academic curriculum which led to a written exam and if successful, they became Associates and entered the clinical phase of training. They then attended hospitals to receive their practical skills training. The final examination was designed to put as much pressure on the candidate as possible. The hospital consultant would sign to say that he was happy for a passing candidate to treat their family.

=== NHSTA 'Extended Ambulance Aid' ===
In the early to mid 1980s, some ambulance service training departments started offering advanced skill training. In 1986, the NHS Training Authority introduced the certificate in Extended Ambulance Aid. Existing AEMT Paramedics were forced to sit a conversion examination. The curriculum for the new qualification was substantially smaller cutting out a lot of anatomy and physiology as well as pharmacology and obstetrics. In November 1986, the examinations took place with the first certificates issued alphabetically. The candidate with highest score received certificate 177 and was the only paramedic at Huntingdon. Training was introduced the following year but due to costs the time was kept to a minimum. The AEMT folded in the 1990s as the training offered was no longer recognised by the ambulance services. Equipment owned by the branches was given to hospitals.

=== Institute for Healthcare Development ===
The NHS Training Authority became the NHS Training Directorate and then the NHS Training Division, which in turn became the Institute of Health and Care Development. The institute was acquired by the Edexcel examination board in 1998, and Edexcel was acquired by Pearson in 2004. Pearson continued to operate the IHCD 'brand' until 2016.

The IHCD Ambulance Aid Award (Technician) was established as an evolution of the Millar training. It included a course of 6 weeks training in various areas, covering a variety of medical and trauma based emergencies, including respiratory and circulatory conditions, cardiac monitoring, oxygen, airways, resuscitation, and maternity.

Also offered was the IHCD Paramedic Practice Award. This 'in-house' paramedic training was a modular programme, usually between ten and 12 weeks, followed by time spent in a hospital emergency department, coronary care centre and operating theatre, assisting the anaesthetist and performing airway management techniques such as endotracheal intubation. Completion of the course allowed the paramedic to register with the Council for Professions Supplementary to Medicine (CPSM), which was superseded by the Health and Care Professions Council (HCPC), a regulatory body.

Prior to regulation and closure of the title, the term "paramedic" was used by a variety of people with varying levels of ability. Paramedics could apply to register via a grandfather scheme which ended in 2002.

Eventually the IHCD began to accredit a few non-NHS training establishments, allowing them to teach their curriculum. In the mid-1990s, some universities started to offer para-medicine diplomas and degrees, in association with local Ambulance Trusts. By necessity these included all of the practical skills found in the IHCD curriculum and allowed applicants to apply for registration with the HPC.

Amongst the professionals regulated by the Health and Care Professions Council, paramedicine was the only one not to have an extant professional body, until the British Paramedic Association was formed in 2001. This later became the Royal College of Paramedics and now acts as a representative organisation for the paramedic profession. Unlike some other professions, membership of the college is not mandatory in order to be a registered paramedic.

==== Deprecation of the IHCD ====
There has been expansion of allied health professions who are regulated, leading to the regulatory body being re-established as the Health and Care Professions Council (HCPC). In 2010, the IHCD route (which by now was jointly badged with BTEC) which as a route to becoming a registered paramedic was largely deprecated, although is still recognised by the HCPC, and anyone successfully completing the BTEC Level 4 qualification is entitled to register as a paramedic. This leaves the university route as the primary pathway for new paramedics, with a number of universities offering qualifications which can lead to registration, both as full-time courses for new students (although they must also be accepted for the practical element of the training by an ambulance service) and part-time courses for existing ambulance staff.

By 2016, the Ambulance Aid Award and Paramedic Practice Award had both been deprecated, and Pearson ran no more courses.

Standards of proficiency which every paramedic must meet in order to become registered were first issued in 2003, with the most recent revision issued by HCPC in September 2014.

== Notable Individuals ==
- Doctor Peter Baskett was one of the world's leading figures in cardiopulmonary resuscitation and pre-hospital medical care. In the early 1970s, alongside Professor Douglas Chamberlain, Baskett developed advanced training for the ambulance personnel who then became the first paramedics in Europe.
- Professor Douglas Chamberlain, together with Baskett, pioneered the first recognisable paramedic training programme in the UK. Up until this point, only basic ambulance training had been in place nationally, having been rolled out only four years earlier.
- Professor Malcolm Woollard was a leading voice for the paramedic profession and the first UK paramedic holding a professorial role. His focus was development of the profession. He was described as "a ground-breaker for the paramedic profession." Woolard died in 2018, but has a legacy of research that lives on.

== Skill grades of staff ==
The specific skills performed by each group of emergency medical personnel is dictated by a combination of education, associated legal frameworks and the policies of their employer. The most homogeneous group are the Paramedics, as the framework of practice is largely guided by their status as healthcare professionals registered with the HCPC.

Other clinics grades such as emergency medical technicians, emergency care support workers and emergency care assistants are not registered professions nor is their job title or role protected or dictated by any national body. Therefore, their skill sets and permitted clinical interventions are governed primarily by their employer within the scope of relevant legislation. This has led to significant differences in training and skill sets between staff of these grades with different employers.

National clinical standards exist for all ambulance clinicians, written by the Joint Royal Colleges Ambulance Liaison Committee (JRCALC). This body is made up of representatives from a number of medical, nursing, allied health professional and ambulance organisations. JRCALC publishes guidance based on the principles of evidence-based medicine and best practice, but compliance with JRCALC is based on the employing organisations and the judgement of individual clinicians.

=== Emergency care assistants (ECA) or emergency care support workers (ECSW) ===
Emergency care assistants or emergency care support workers are trained to a basic level of ambulance practice. As a result, they typically work as assistants to a paramedic, technician or AAP. Their role varies widely between services and as such, their clinical knowledge is typically from that of first aid up to the FutureQuals Level 3 Diploma in Ambulance Emergency and Urgent Care Support or, in the private sector, Qualsafe FREC4.

To reduce costs, many ambulance organisations have tried to reduce the number of ambulance technicians, increasing the number of emergency care support worker or emergency care assistants. Some U.K. ambulances services have taken this one step further by hiring "emergency drivers" with no medical training.

=== Ambulance Technicians ===
Ambulance technicians, or emergency medical technicians (EMTs), form a large proportion of the workforce in emergency medical care, although the title lacks formal definition or protection. However, moves within the private sector is being made to start regulating and adding accountability to non-registered Healthcare Professionals in the Pre-Hospital Arena. Due to the lack of regulation and standardisation of the Technician Scope some private companies use First Aiders as Technicians which has given private companies a bad name which is potentially unwarranted. Generally, Ambulance Technicians can either work autonomously, making their own clinical decisions within their training and remit, or as assistants to a paramedic.

Technicians within the ambulance services have historically completed the Institute of Healthcare Development (IHCD) ambulance aid award (awarded by Edexcel, part of Pearson) which was a course lasting around six weeks in the classroom A three-week emergency driving programme was available alongside the Ambulance Aid qualification. This qualified the person as a trainee technician, and after a period (usually around a year) on the road, a plenary examination is taken to complete the training and become a qualified ambulance technician (QAT). Whilst now deprecated by the NHS services, the qualification is still available as a BTEC level 4, and can be trained by the ambulance services or a number of private training providers up until Pearson stopped running the courses in 2016. The IHCD emergency driving programme was certificated as a 'stand-alone' qualification.

Alternative qualifications exist, especially in the private sector, although there is no set standard between qualifications. Other qualifications include the QualSafe Level 5 First Response Emergency and Urgent Care and the FutureQuals Level 4 Diploma for Associate Ambulance Practitioners (L4AAP). QualSafe also run the Associate Ambulance Practitioners course covering the same topics.

The term EMT has gained some tension between NHS Trusts and some Private Providers as some of them use lower clinical grades which do not meet the FPHC PHEM Grade F standard as EMTs. The term Emergency Medical Technician is not a protected title they are allowed to do this however the scope of practice difference has caused issue, especially when time critical patients are being transported by NHS resources from an event site. This has led some companies and charities to call those with the Level 4 Diploma for Associate Ambulance Practitioners by their qualification as opposed to a job title like Ambulance Technician.

==== Similar roles ====
St John Ambulance (SJA) is the only voluntary aid society in the UK to provide emergency ambulance response at events and/or in support of the NHS. In 2020, the charity launched a new internal qualification called Emergency Ambulance Crew (EAC) specifically for its volunteer ambulance clinicians. This replaced previous ambulance roles, which were essentially ECA/ECSW roles.

The EAC course takes around five to six weeks in the classroom depending on cohort size, with a minimum Guided Learning Hours (GLH) of 160hrs, in addition to around 60 hours of on-road experience shifts. This is then followed by a 12-month preceptorship period where newly qualified crews must be suitably supervised. The classroom hours component of EAC is comparable to that of the FREUC5 delivery plan which specifies a minimum GLH of 154hrs in the classroom setting.

Importantly though, the EAC qualification does not include the 750hrs of frontline practice placement time required of FREUC5 and AAP, instead St John Ambulance has an annual revalidation / appraisal cycle and requires all EACs to deliver a minimum of 240hrs per year in their clinical role in order to be revalidated into the following year.

This appraisal includes review of a portfolio which must include:

- 6 Reflective Practice write-ups showing evidence of self-development (taken from patients attended in that calendar year)
- Evidence of completion of relevant CPD (40hrs p.a target)
- Evidence of attendance at mandatory 2 days face to face training
- Evidence of annual ILS assessments (adult, paediatric and neonate)
- Certificates for all online learning elements
- Up to date Prescription Medication Authorisations (for Salbutamol, Adrenaline etc)

The EAC role and qualification were developed to meet the specification for a national ambulance auxiliary for NHS England, which required a large cohort of ambulance clinicians capable of deploying to all categories of 999 call, which SJA was formally commissioned for in 2022.

The EAC scope of practice has been designed to incorporate all required skills and interventions within FPHC Skills Descriptor F and includes all competencies required of an EMT/AAP. When working for St John Ambulance on events, EACs and AAPs carry the same medications & equipment and work to the same scope of practice.

When describing the skills and competencies of an EAC on their website, the charity says;

Our Emergency Ambulance Crew (EACs) are trained and equipped to modern pre-hospital standards. They support our First Aid volunteers on events, work on specialist NHS contracts, and provide additional capacity to NHS 999 services. Competencies include:

- Comprehensive patient assessment skills including obtaining 12 lead ECG and recognition of gross abnormalities.
- Intermediate life support including airway management with i-gels and capnography.
- Administration of analgesic and lifesaving medications such as adrenaline, Penthrox, salbutamol, glucagon and more.
- Assessment and management of obstetric, medical, surgical and trauma patients including management of catastrophic haemorrhage.
- Assisting Healthcare Professionals to provide advanced life support and enhanced patient care.
- Selecting appropriate treatment pathways for patients in their care, discharging or referring to a variety of NHS care providers and specialist centres, including providing blue light emergency transport when required.

The EAC qualification itself is currently unregulated and lacks transparency, which has caused speculation and confusion both with customers and with NHS ambulance trusts. When working on the ambulance auxiliary contract, EACs were deployed in some areas at the level of a technician, while several trusts restricted EACs to the role of ECA. This was most likely a consequence of utilising an unregulated qualification rather than any deficiency in the scope of practice or training. The CQC inspected services where EACs worked at both of these levels & they found that deployment of EACs in either of these settings was both safe and effective and rated SJA's ambulance services as 'Good' across the board.

=== Associate Ambulance Practitioners (AAP) ===
Associate ambulance practitioners work as non-registered healthcare professionals, similar in scope of practice to the now discontinued IHCD technician qualification. The role was established in 2015, after a nationally recognised standard was agreed between the national ambulance trusts and is defined by the FutureQuals Level 4 Diploma for Associate Ambulance Practitioners. Generally, AAPs can either work autonomously, making their own clinical decisions within their training and remit, or as assistants to a paramedic.

The training standards were written with the NHS National Education Network for Ambulance Services (NENAS), which included consultation with the Association of Ambulance Chief Executives and the College of Paramedics. The idea of having the NENAS involved in the creation of the scope and abilities of an AAP and to create a qualification which is portable and accepted everywhere within the UK.

The role is commonly known within NHS Trusts and beyond as Emergency Medical Technicians, Ambulance Technicians, Technicians, or Associate Ambulance Practitioners (AAP). The range of titles come from when the IHCD copyrighted the title Emergency Medical Technician which only allowed those who had completed the IHCD Ambulance Aid qualification to be called an Emergency Medical Technician. The title of the role being an Associate Practitioner brings the naming of Ambulance Roles inline with the NHS Career Framework and helps to identify responsibilities amongst the mass of titles across the health services. AAPs are trained to a minimum of FPHC PHEM Grade F like the IHCD Technicians, many NHS Ambulance Trusts train their AAPs with some more advanced skills such as advanced ECG recognition and wound closure on top of the national standard.

Some companies and charities call those who hold the Level 4 Diploma for Associate Ambulance Practitioners by their qualification as opposed to a job title like ambulance technician to make it clearer they hold the portable Level 4 Diploma.

=== Paramedics ===
==== Clinical grades of paramedic ====
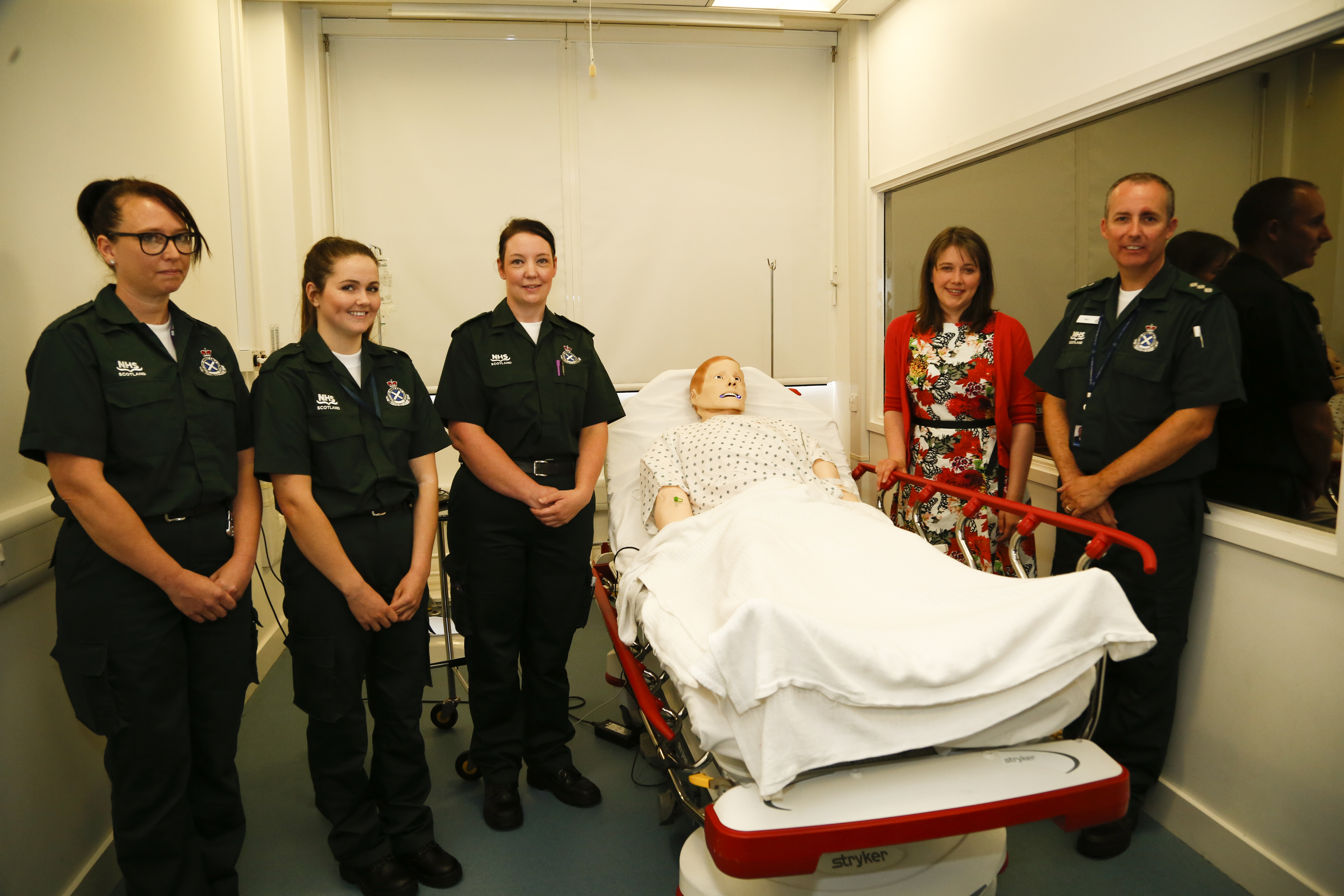
Scottish Student Paramedics

The Royal College of Paramedics has published a framework for paramedic education which details the attainable clinical grades of UK paramedics as below:

- Paramedic (BSc Honours)
- Specialist paramedic (PgDip)
- Advanced paramedic (MSc)
- Consultant paramedic / Director / Professor (Doctorate)

===== Consultant paramedic controversy =====
While the Royal College of Paramedics is clear that a doctorate is required to work at consultant paramedic grade, there are many paramedics employed with this job title who do not hold, and are not working towards, a doctorate degree.

Some UK ambulance services are open that they may employ consultant paramedics without the necessity for them to hold a doctorate. When directly questioned about this issue, NWAS admitted that out of their 8 consultant paramedics only 1 had a doctorate degree.

Although the College of Paramedics stipulates a doctorate degree being required in its career framework to be considered a consultant paramedic, the college accepts consultant paramedics onto their register with only a master's level degree.

==== Academic paramedicine ====
Paramedics in the UK are involved in academic research and education. There are now a number of paramedics in post as professors, associate professors and senior lecturers across the United Kingdom. There is also a monthly peer-reviewed UK paramedic journal in the form of the Journal of Paramedic Practice, which publishes primary research and other articles of interest to UK paramedics and prehospital care clinicians.

The College of Paramedics has delineated a post-graduate career pathway for paramedics in academia and education, although this varies by institution and is only a guide.

- Research paramedic / Practice educator (AFHEA)
- Research fellow / Lecturer (FHEA)
- Reader / Principal lecturer (SFHEA)
- Professor (PFHEA)

==== Other paramedic grades ====
Some paramedics undertake further training or higher educational programs in order to work as advanced practitioners. These may be known as community paramedics, advanced clinical practitioners, paramedic practitioners, critical care paramedics and emergency care practitioners.

Across the country the scope of practice of each advanced paramedic varies, however many can be found offering unscheduled care in situations where the patient does not need to travel to hospital, when the practitioner decides care can be provided without needing to see a GP. Some of these roles are very similar to those carried out by specialist nurses, thus, blurring professional boundaries. Some roles like advanced practitioner courses and the emergency care practitioner courses are offered to both professions as interchangeable skills are present.

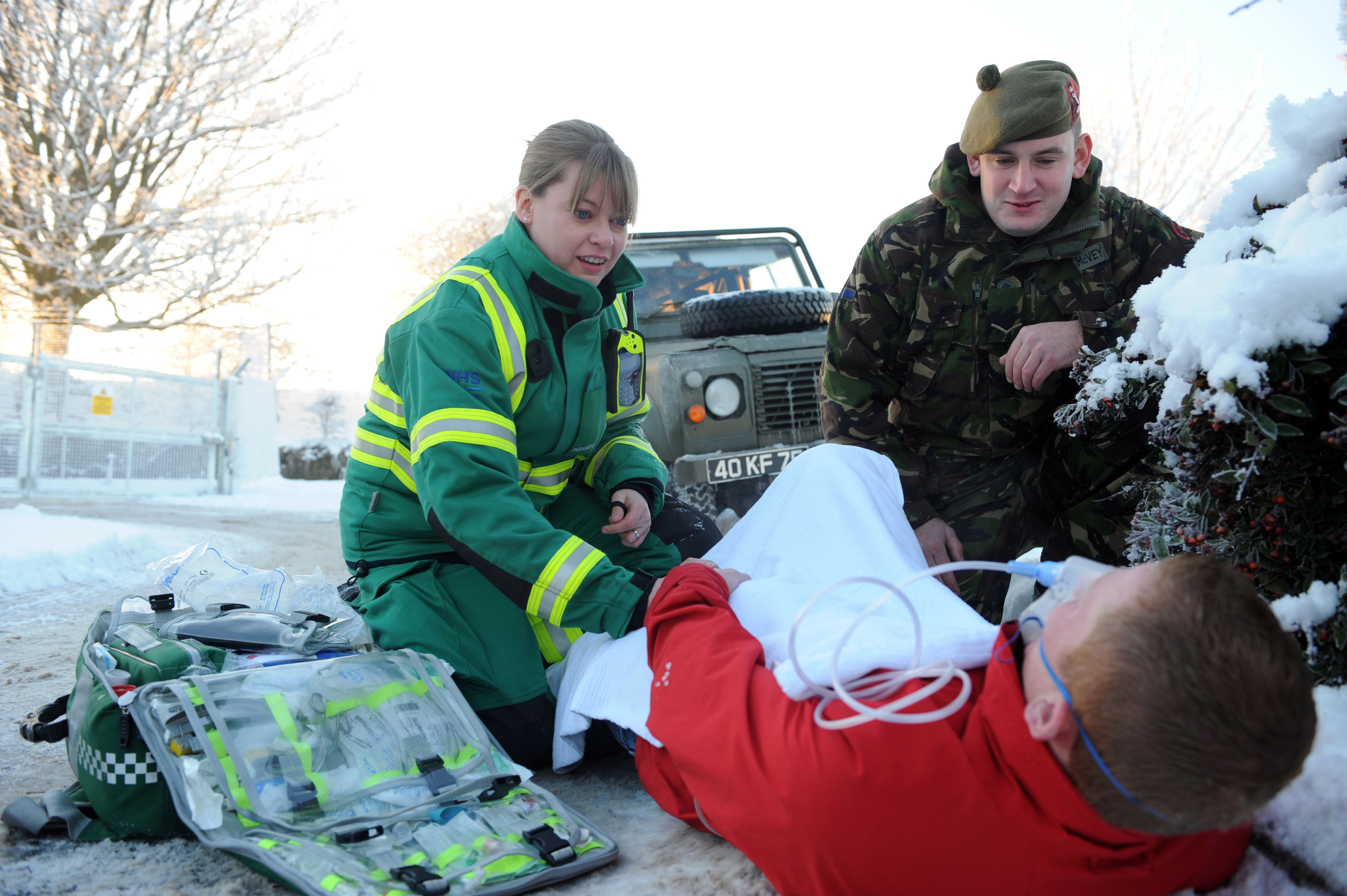
SORT Paramedic with military colleague during a training exercise

Many paramedics choose to progress their career by qualifying to further levels, such as by undertaking additional diplomas or higher degrees.

Paramedics or pre-hospital care providers in the UK may also use other titles such as:

- Critical care paramedic
- HEMS paramedic
- Advanced paramedic practitioner
- USAR paramedic - Urban Search and Rescue
- HART paramedic - Hazardous Area Response Team

== Scope of practice ==
=== Ambulance technicians or associate ambulance practitioners ===
The drugs administered by technicians, AAPs & St John Ambulance EACs are given under provision of The Human Medicines Regulations 2012, and under direction of the JRCALC Clinical Practice Guidelines. They include general sales list (GSL), Pharmacy Only (P) and Prescription Only (POM) medicines under schedule 19 of the regulation.

Medicines typically carried and administered by technicians/AAPs & St John Ambulance EACs include:

- Adrenaline 1:1000 (for anaphylaxis)
- Glucagon
- Naloxone
- Hydrocortisone
- GTN
- Salbutamol
- Ipratropium bromide
- Over-the-counter medicines (eg. oral paracetamol, aspirin)
- Oxygen
- Entonox
- Some services (such as St John Ambulance) also allow administration of Penthrox for pain relief

Procedures carried out by technicians or AAPs can include:

- Intermediate Life Support, including manual defibrillation and supraglottic airway placement
- Chest palpation, auscultation and percussion
- Manual or mechanical suctioning
- Traction and pelvic splinting
- 12-lead ECG Placement and ST-Elevation Myocardial infarction interpretation (with the ability to admit directly to a hospital with percutaneous coronary intervention)
- Abdominal palpation, auscultation and percussion
- Catastrophic haemorrhage management
- Non-pharmacological analgesic strategies (TWEED-SASH)
- Ability to discharge patients to different care pathways

=== Paramedics ===
The drugs paramedics are allowed to administer are regulated in UK law and include controlled drugs (CD). The Joint Royal Colleges Ambulance Liaison Committee provide clinical guidelines on when they should be used.

Other drugs are given by paramedics with advanced training, either by utilising a patient group direction (PGD) or simply because they are classified as over the counter (OTC) medicines which are available to anyone.

Procedures carried out by paramedics include that of technicians/AAPs as well as potentially:

- Patient assessment
- Cannulation
- Advanced life support
- Endotracheal intubation
- Needle cricothyroidotomy
- Needle thoracocentesis
- 12 Lead ECG interpretation
- Wound closure
- Otoscopy
- Laryngoscopy
- Autonomous recognition of life extinct (death) in specific circumstances
- Cardiac auscultation
- Autonomous thrombolysis
- Capnography
- Cranial nerve and neurological examination

In some parts of the country, paramedics and EMTs are able to bypass accident and emergency departments for specialist units for patients having a stroke. Currently the FAST test is used to determine a patient's suitability to be transported directly to a specialist unit. On admission to the specialist hospital the patient should rapidly receive a CT scan of their head, to guide treatment.

=== Advanced paramedics ===
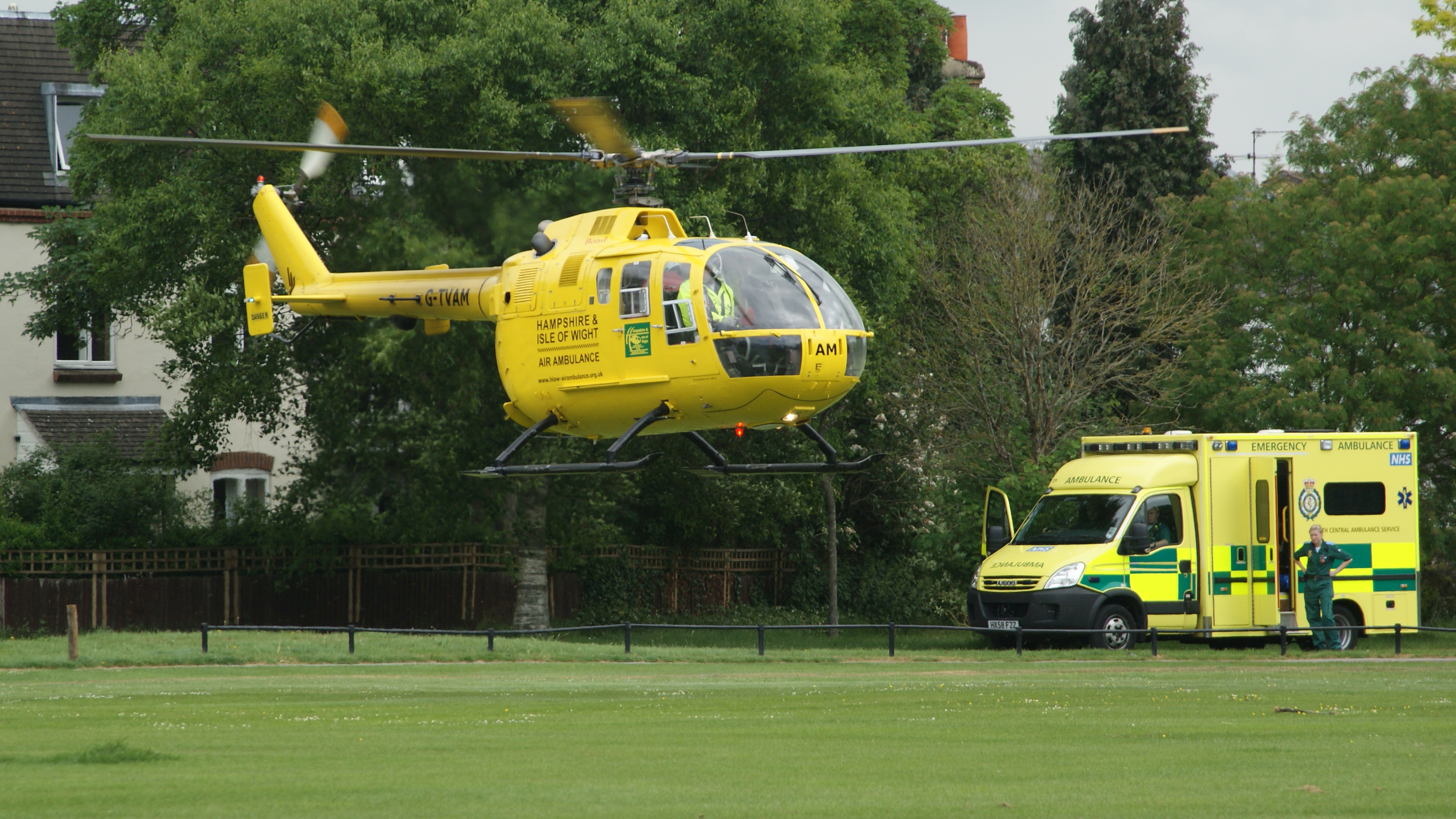
Air ambulance staffed with advanced paramedics

Advanced paramedics typically hold a master's level degree in Paramedic Science or Advanced Practice, many are non-medical prescribers and can deliver care in a pre-hospital environment that has traditionally only been performed by doctors.

Procedures carried out by advanced paramedics can include:

- Thoracostomy
- Mechanical ventilator and CPAP
- Fracture/dislocation manipulation
- Ultrasound
- Sedation/anaesthesia

== Driver skills ==
The majority of NHS, private, and voluntary providers, who undertake emergency response, provide training in the form of FutureQuals Level 3 Certificate in Emergency Response Ambulance Driving. This replaced the IHCD D1 (Non emergency driving), IHCD D2 (Emergency driving) and BTEC Level 3 in Emergency Response Driving.

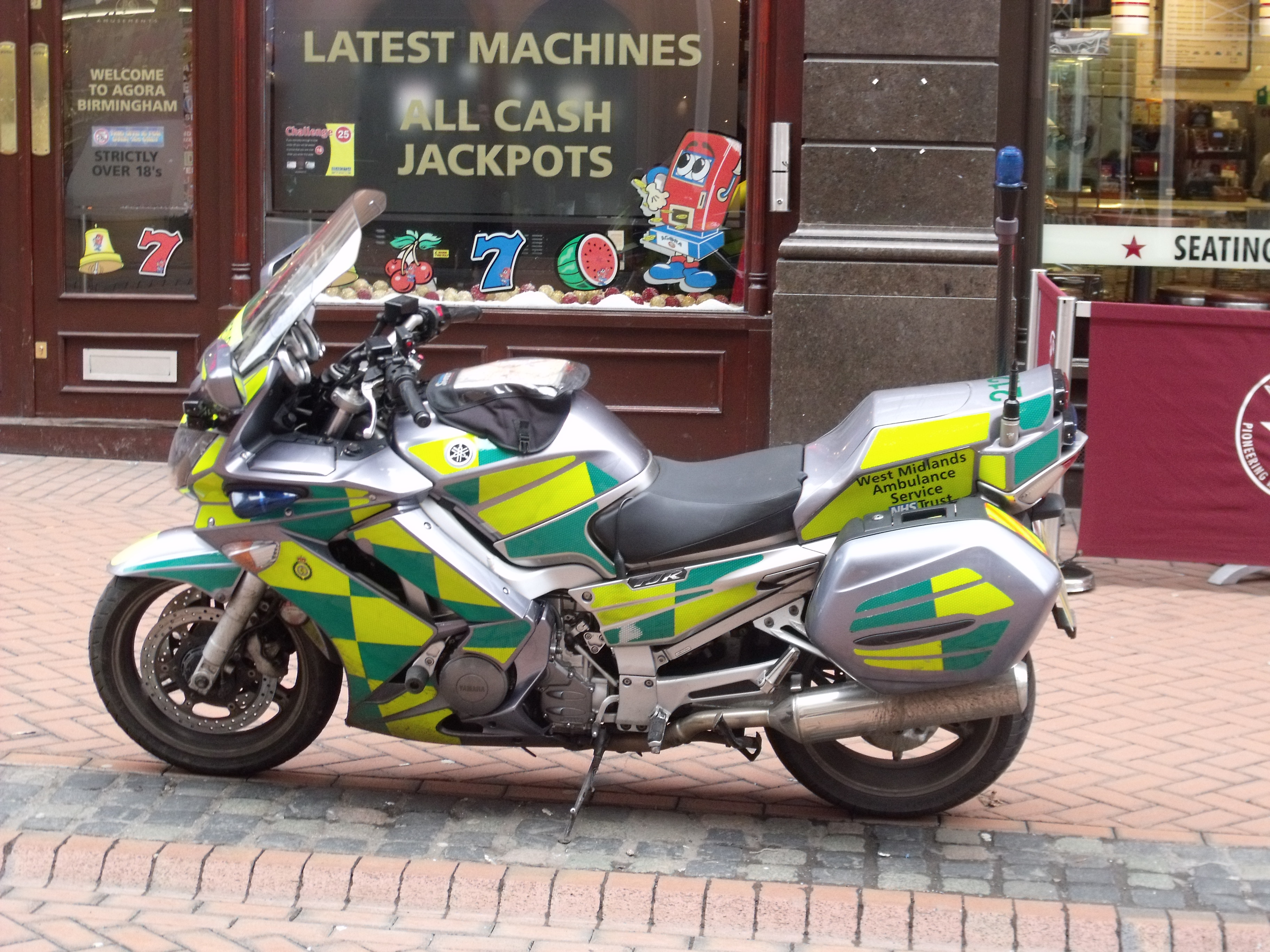
Ambulance response vehicle

There is currently no legal requirement for emergency response drivers to undergo any additional training to claim exemptions such as use of blue lights, exceeding the speed limit, or passing through red traffic lights. However vehicles must be insured to take blue light exemptions, with most insurance vendors requiring some certification of training. A proposed change to Section 19 of The Road Safety Act 2006 will require a person to have completed a training course in the driving of vehicles at high speed in order to exceed speed limits.

== See also ==
- BASICS Scotland
- Highland PICT Team
- British Association for Immediate Care (BASICS)
- Cycle responder
- Air ambulances in the United Kingdom

== Sources ==
- "Health and Care Professions Council".
- "IHCD".
- "Ambulance Service Association" (PDF). Archived from the original (PDF) on 9 May 2006.
- "College of Paramedics". Archived from the original on 26 April 2013.
