= Paramedic =

Healthcare professional working outside of hospitals

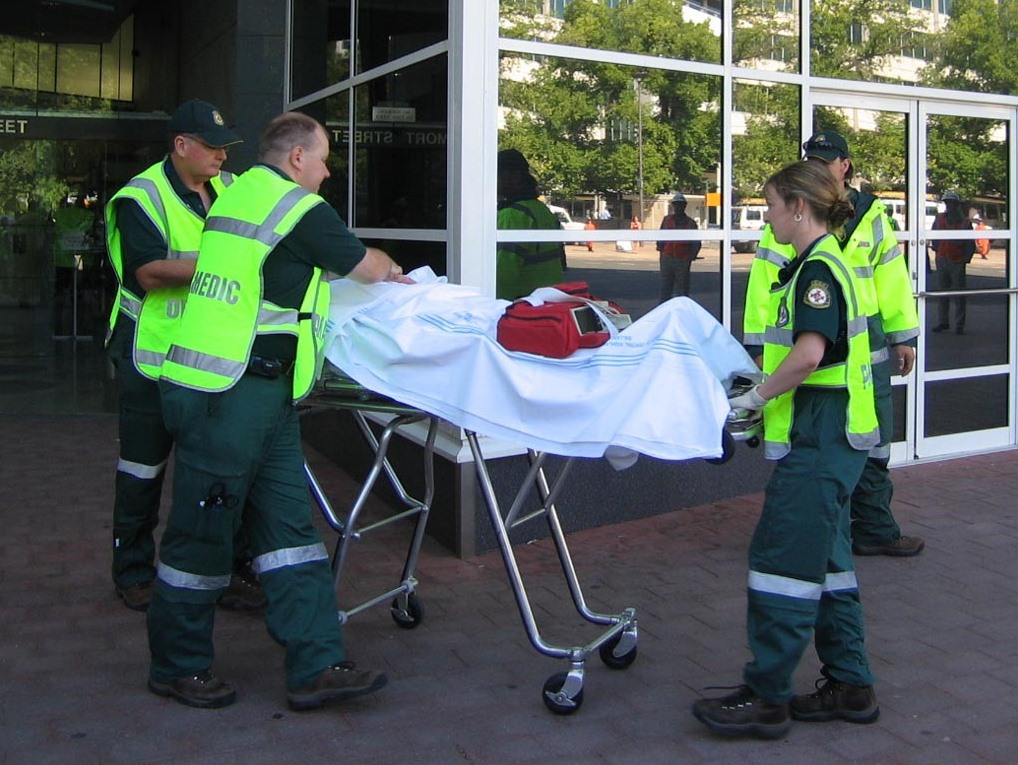
- Paramedics of the Australian Capital Territory Ambulance Service during training

Occupation
- Names: Paramedic
- Occupation type: Profession
- Activity sectors: Health care

Description
- Fields of employment: Ambulance; hospital; pre-hospital; transport
- Related jobs: Emergency medical technician, emergency physician

A paramedic is a healthcare professional trained in the medical model, whose main role has historically been to respond to emergency calls for medical help outside of a hospital. Paramedics work as part of the emergency medical services (EMS), most often in ambulances. They also have roles in emergency medicine, primary care, transfer medicine and remote/offshore medicine. The scope of practice of a paramedic varies between countries, but generally includes autonomous decision making around the emergency care of patients.

Not all ambulance personnel are paramedics, although the term is sometimes used informally to refer to any ambulance personnel. In some English-speaking countries, there is an official distinction between paramedics and emergency medical technicians (or emergency care assistants), in which paramedics have additional educational requirements and scope of practice.

== Functions and duties ==
The paramedic role is closely related to other healthcare positions, especially the emergency medical technician, with paramedics often being at a higher grade with more responsibility and autonomy following substantially greater education and training. The primary role of a paramedic is to stabilize people with life-threatening injuries and transport these patients to a higher level of care (typically an emergency department). Due to the nature of their job, paramedics work in many environments, including roadways, people's homes, and depending on their qualifications, wilderness environments, hospitals, aircraft, and with SWAT teams during police operations. Paramedics also work in non-emergency situations, such as transporting chronically ill patients to and from treatment centers and in some areas, address social determinants of health and provide in-home care to ill patients at risk of hospitalization (a practice known as community paramedicine).

The role of a paramedic varies widely across the world, as EMS providers operate with many different models of care. In the Anglo-American model, paramedics are autonomous decision-makers. In some countries such as the United Kingdom and South Africa, the paramedic role has developed into an autonomous health profession. In the Franco-German model, ambulance care is led by physicians. In some versions of this model, such as France, there is no direct equivalent to a paramedic. Ambulance staff have either the more advanced qualifications of a physician or less advanced training in first aid. In other versions of the Franco-German model, such as Germany, paramedics do exist. Their role is very similar to the role of paramedics in the Anglo-American model with an advanced scope of autonomy and practice, and the added element of emergency physician backup, either virtually (Tele-Notarzt) or on scene with a rapid response vehicle / helicopter. The role of paramedics in Germany has evolved from support to physicians in the field to the central role in pre-hospital emergency care.

The development of the profession has been a gradual move from simply transporting patients to hospital, to more advanced treatments in the field. In some countries, the paramedic may take on the role as part of a system to prevent hospitalization entirely and, through practitioners, are able to prescribe certain medications, or undertaking 'see and refer' visits, where the paramedic directly refers a patient to specialist services without taking them to hospital.

== Occupational hazards ==
Paramedics are exposed to a variety of hazards such as lifting patients and equipment, treating those with infectious disease, handling hazardous substances, and transportation via ground or air vehicles. Employers can prevent occupational illness or injury by providing safe patient handling equipment, implementing a training program to educate paramedics on job hazards, and supplying PPE such as respirators, gloves, and isolation gowns when dealing with biological hazards.

Infectious disease has become a major concern, in light of the COVID-19 pandemic. In response, the U.S. Centers for Disease Control and Prevention and other agencies and organizations have issued guidance regarding workplace hazard controls for COVID-19. Some specific recommendations include modified call queries, symptom screening, universal PPE use, hand hygiene, physical distancing, and stringent disinfection protocols. Research on ambulance ventilation systems found that aerosols often recirculate throughout the compartment, creating a health hazard for paramedics when transporting sick patients capable of airborne transmission. Unidirectional airflow design can better protect workers.

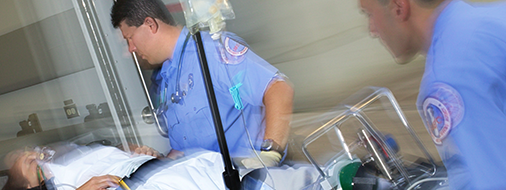
Emergency medical services (EMS) personnel deliver emergency medical treatment before hospital arrival.

=== Physical injuries ===
Paramedics are widely recognized to face high risks of physical injuries in their line of work. More than 22,000 EMS providers visit the emergency room each year for work-related injuries. Some physical injuries encountered when providing healthcare services include lifting injuries, back strains, and needlestick incidences. Injuries such as sprains and strains mostly occur in the back and neck, and injuries are most prevalent while responding to 911 calls, which include patient care and transport. These injuries are prevalent but not impossible to overcome; they require preventive measures to minimize the chance of them happening. Safe lifting techniques and patient-handling equipment are major factors in reducing paramedics' physical injury risk. Workers with less than 10 years' experience are most at risk, pointing to the need for targeted prevention strategies for newer employees. By employing the proposed measures to reduce physical injuries, it will be possible to mitigate the hazards faced by paramedics, to help paramedics stay safe while rendering the most needed services.

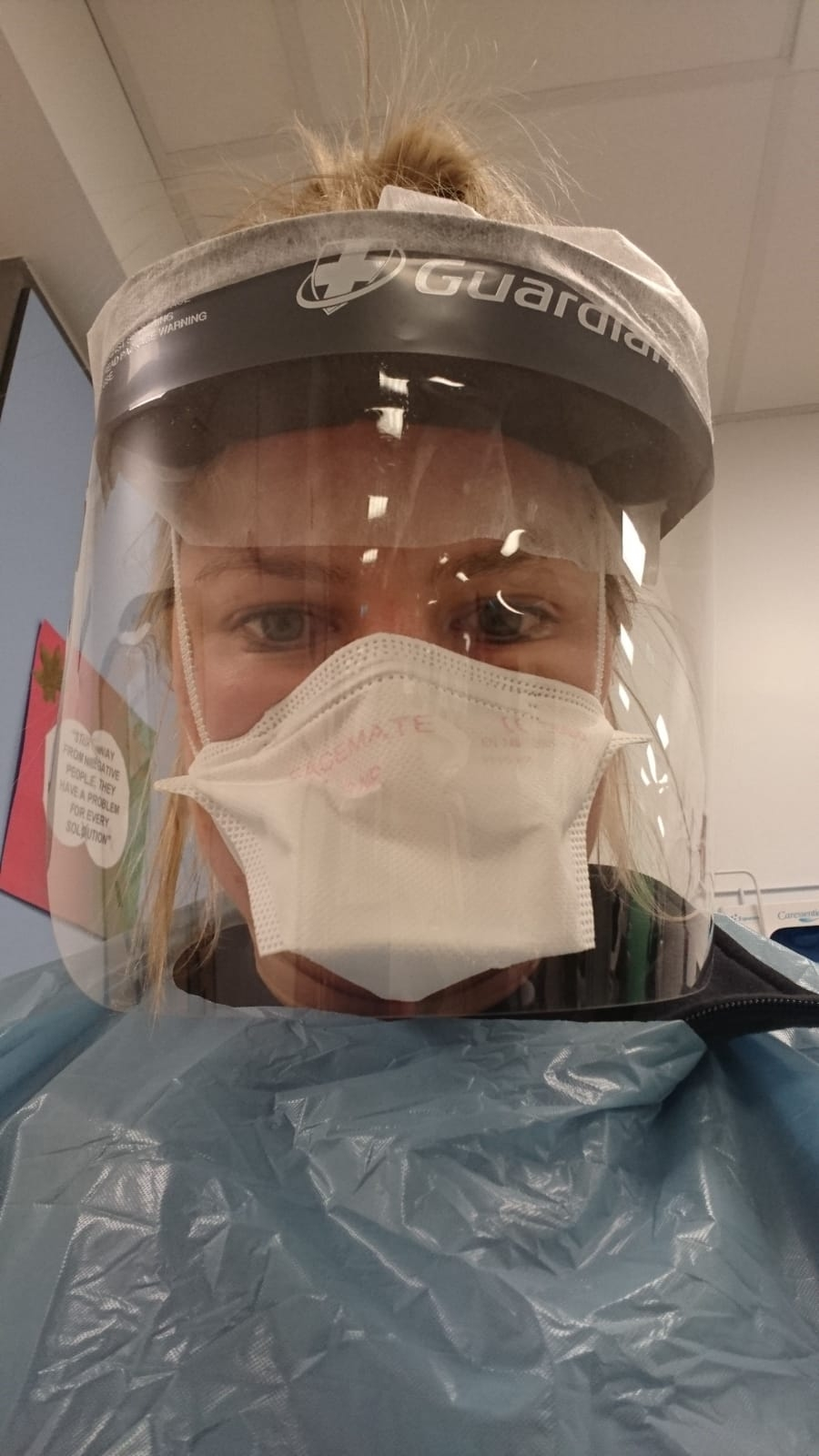
A paramedic wearing PPE

=== Infectious diseases ===
The risk of contracting infectious diseases is common in the paramedic profession. The COVID-19 pandemic strengthens the necessity of following safety protocols. Preventive measures for healthcare workers from needlestick injuries and infectious disease is critical. Including, the immediate disposal of sharps in puncture-resistant containers and wearing appropriate personal protective equipment (PPE) and strict adherence to post-exposure protocols, enhances safety. Additionally, staying updated with vaccinations, including those for flu, COVID-19, Hepatitis B. Furthermore, adhering to infection control practices, such as hand hygiene, environmental cleaning, and specialized control programs, are vital for preventing infections like MRSA, TB, and COVID-19. Personal Protective Equipment (PPE) usage in implementation and vaccination compliance are effective transmission reduction measures for infectious diseases among paramedics. Exposures to blood pathogens and body fluids through incidents, for example, needlestick injuries which jeopardizes paramedics at risk of infectious diseases such as Hepatitis B, and Hepatitis C, and HIV affecting around 6,000 EMS workers. This realization strengthens the need for science-based methods in preventing the occupational risks posed by infectious diseases with a foregrounding of the role of preventative measures geared towards protecting the health of paramedic professionals and, at the same time, the community.

=== Chemical exposures ===
Paramedics encounter daily risks associated with handling hazardous chemicals. As a result, they must understand how to deliver care safely to remain protected in the service provision. They need to remain cautious for them to stay safe in the process of providing care. There are numerous associated risks from chemical exposures in prehospital settings. The use of PPE and standard precautions are necessary to prevent harmful exposures for paramedics. Desirable implementation of the ordered processing of hazardous material and the proper decontamination process are effective strategies in combating hazard risk. Such steps are necessary to ensure fewer cases of health hazards to paramedics.

=== Environmental and operational hazards ===
Paramedics are confronted with many challenges exhibited in the form of environmental and operational risks, primarily during transportation. These transportation-related hazards should be considered and addressed in prehospital care. Slips, trips, and falls; motor vehicle incidents; and violence or assaults have huge impact on paramedics' occupational hazards, resulting to thousands of paramedics impacted annually. Vehicle safety features need to be known by paramedics, and so must undergo exhaustive emergency driving training, which looks into curbing the provisions that are the peril of transportation. Paramedics are frequently assaulted by patients or bystanders affecting around 2,000 EMS workers annually, which further hammers the need for training on de-escalation. NIOSH and the Department of Homeland Security have conducted ambulance crash testing, resulting in the development of 10 test methods published by the Society of Automotive Engineers (SAE) to reduce and eliminate crash-related injuries to EMS workers. Through effective training, the threat cases are more likely to be mitigated, and the paramedics will have a better chance to provide services as required.

== Protective measures and equipment ==
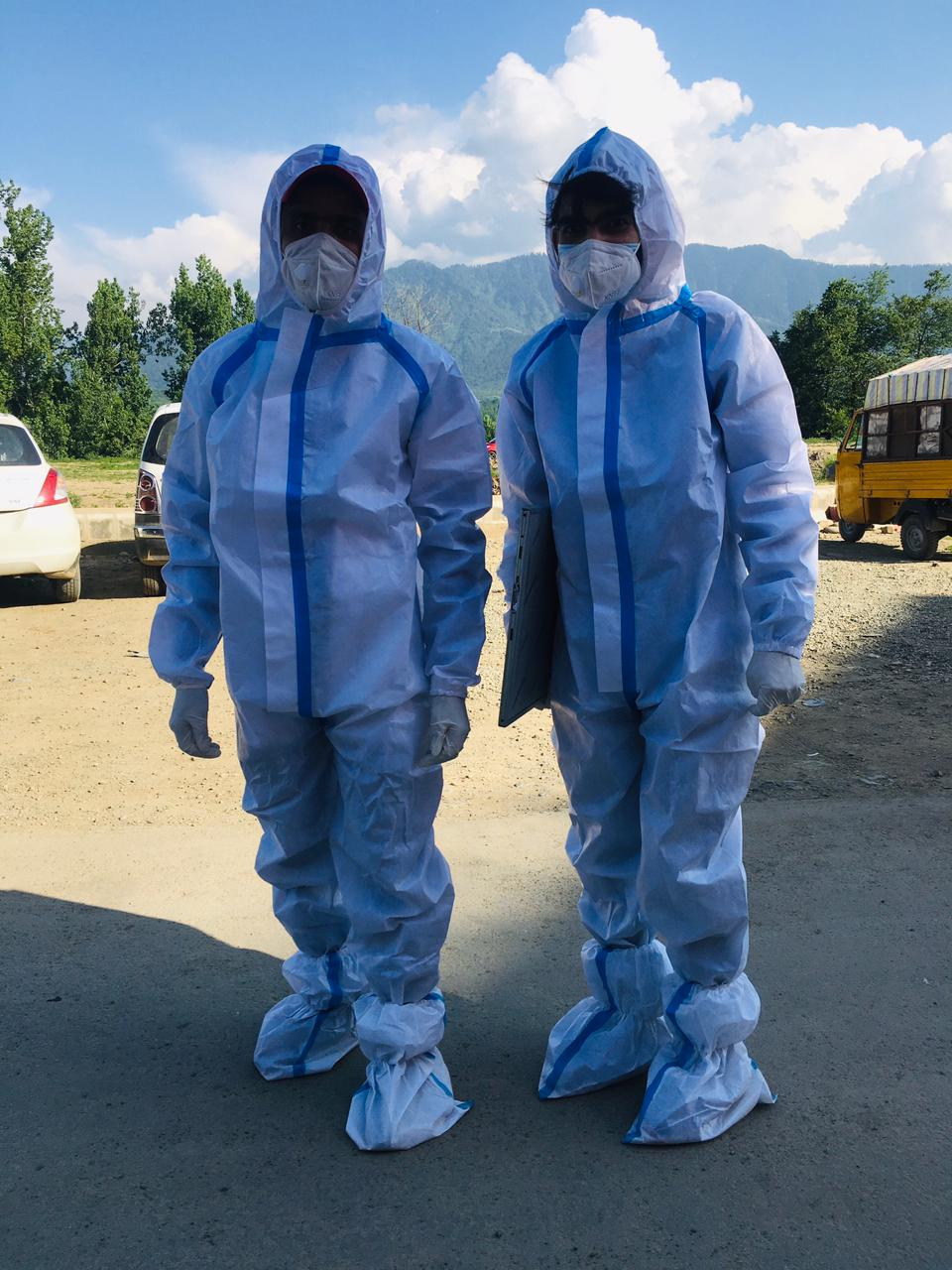
EMS workers wearing PPE

One way of ensuring paramedics work at optimal efficiency is to provide them with protective equipment and gear to mitigate the possible risks when executing their duties. PPE keeps paramedics' occupational risks low. Examples of PPEs include gloves, masks, and gown or specific clothing; they protect workers from physical, biological, and chemical hazards. The different types of PPE include respiratory, eye, face, and hand protection. Under respiratory protection, paramedics can use N95 masks to filter airborne contaminants. Chemical splashes are also a common hazard faced by paramedics, where safety goggles can be used for eye protection. Underhand protection, paramedics can employ gloves mainly to curb burns. One of the principles of PPE is that choices should be guided by specific risks associated with various emergencies, which warrant different PPE requirements.

=== Mental health and stress management ===
Paramedic are involved in challenging professions and can be subject to different kinds of psychological stress, for instance, post-traumatic stress disorder, depression, or severe burnout. The psychological aspect is intertwined with the nature of the paramedics' work. Exposure to traumatic events such as accidents, medical emergencies, and violence are some of the factors undermining the psychological health of paramedics. Mental health issues, including depression, anxiety, and substance abuse, are some of the mental health issues paramedics are likely to get exposed to due to their nature of work as compared to the general population. Stable support systems that may include peer counselling and the availability of mental health resources become essential in building the resilience of paramedic professionals. Peer counselling programs appear to be an effective stress management strategy for paramedics. Taking part in open discussions with other peers who understand what the employee is going through determines the necessary supportive grounds that facilitate managing and processing feelings related to this work.

=== Health risks and monitoring ===
The long-term health risks that need to be observed by the paramedics are post-traumatic stress disorder (PTSD), cardiovascular diseases (CVDs), and cancer risk. There are a variety of challenges paramedics encounter, including PTSD, which should provide a compelling reason to implement preventive mental health measures within this profession. Moreover, there is an extra risk for CVDs because of the heaviness of emergency response operations. There is a need to emphasize cancer risk and the importance of constant exploration and individualized prevention patterns. Besides, there is the cumulative effect of fatigue, violence, and trauma on the health of paramedics. As a result, there is a need for systematic monitoring and preventive measures in health among paramedics. It is necessary to study long-term health risks for paramedics and apply a prophylactic approach to maintaining the health state of healthcare professionals.

=== Regulatory guidelines and recommendations ===
The regulatory guidelines are fundamental in eliminating occupational risk in paramedicine; authoritative bodies like the Occupational Safety and Health Administration (OSHA) and the World Health Organization (WHO) provide specific guidelines. For example, in United States, physical, chemical, and biological hazards are managed by operating under the guidelines and recommendations offered by National Institute for Occupational Safety and Health (NIOSH) and OSHA, targeting the healthcare industry especially. These include properly using PPE, handling hazardous substances, and adequately managing workplace violence. Moreover, the WHO provides global views by laying international standards to protect the well-being of the staff involved in the healthcare provided, irrespective of whether it is an emergency or routine operation. Such regulatory bodies, as the ones promoting national and global safety standards, ensure that evidence-based approaches reinforce adherence to their occupational health being safeguarded.

== History ==
=== Early history ===
Throughout the evolution of pre-hospitalization care, there has been an ongoing association with military conflict. One of the first indications of a formal process for managing injured people dates from the Imperial Legions of Rome, where aging Centurions, no longer able to fight, were given the task of organizing the removal of the wounded from the battlefield and providing some form of care. Such individuals, although not physicians, were probably among the world's earliest surgeons by default, being required to suture wounds and complete amputations. A similar situation existed in the Crusades, with the Knights Hospitaller of the Order of St. John of Jerusalem filling a similar function; this organisation continued, and evolved into what is now known throughout the Commonwealth of Nations as the St. John Ambulance and as the Order of Malta Ambulance Corps in the Republic of Ireland and various countries.

=== Early ambulance services ===
While civilian communities had organized ways to deal with prehospitalisation care and transportation of the sick and dying as far back as the bubonic plague in London between 1598 and 1665, such arrangements were typically ad hoc and temporary. In time, however, these arrangements began to formalize and become permanent. During the American Civil War, Jonathan Letterman devised a system of mobile field hospitals employing the first uses of the principles of triage. After returning home, some veterans began to attempt to apply what they had seen on the battlefield to their own communities, and commenced the creation of volunteer life-saving squads and ambulance corps.

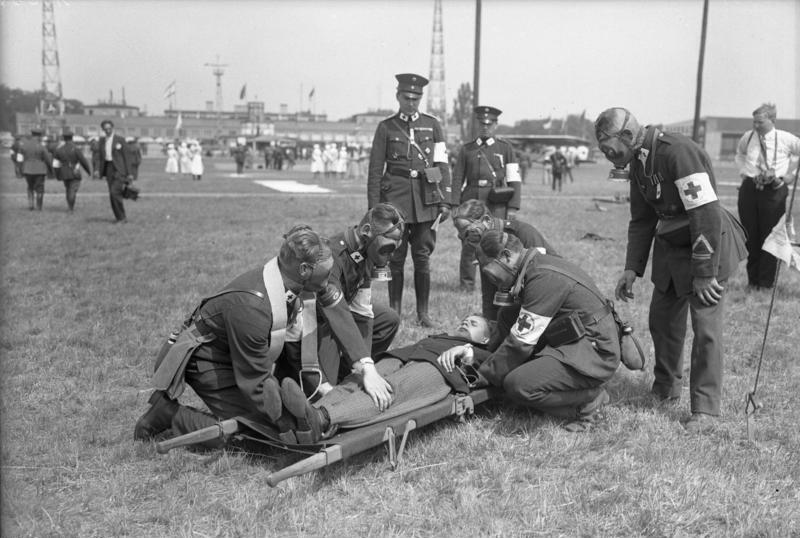
German Red Cross paramedics training in 1931

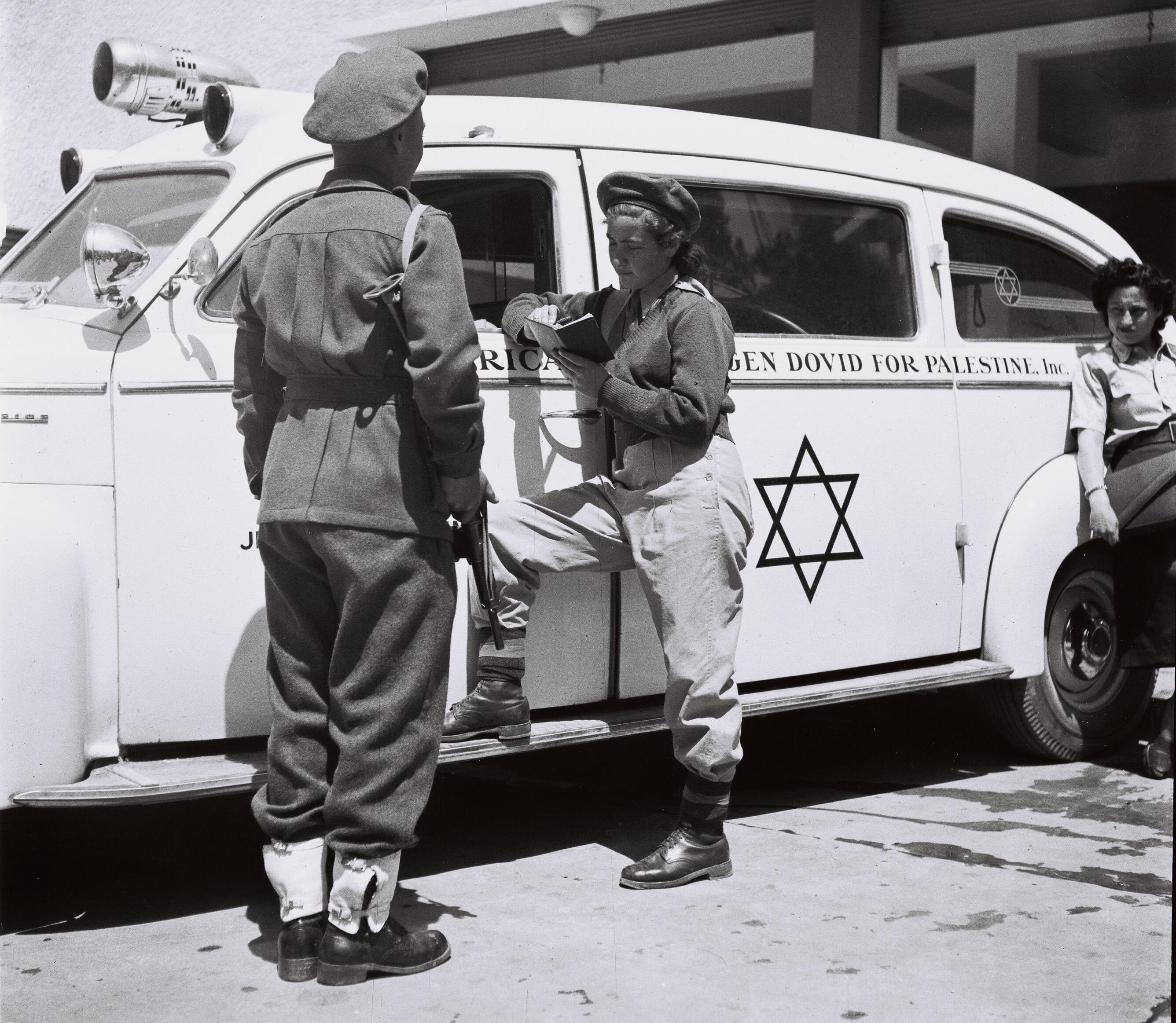
Ambulance of the Magen David Adom in Israel, 6 June 1948

These early developments in formalized ambulance services were decided at local levels, and this led to services being provided by diverse operators such as the local hospital, police, fire brigade, or even funeral directors who often possessed the only local transport allowing a passenger to lie down. In most cases these ambulances were operated by drivers and attendants with little or no medical training, and it was some time before formal training began to appear in some units. An early example was the members of the Toronto Police Ambulance Service receiving a mandatory five days of training from St. John as early as 1889.

Prior to World War I motorized ambulances started to be developed, but once they proved their effectiveness on the battlefield during the war the concept spread rapidly to civilian systems. In terms of advanced skills, once again the military led the way. During World War II and the Korean War battlefield medics administered painkilling narcotics by injection in emergency situations, and pharmacists' mates on warships were permitted to do even more without the guidance of a physician. The Korean War also marked the first widespread use of helicopters to evacuate the wounded from forward positions to medical units, leading to the rise of the term "medevac". These innovations would not find their way into the civilian sphere for nearly twenty more years.

=== Pre-hospital emergency medical care ===
By the early 1960s experiments in improving medical care had begun in some civilian centres. One early experiment involved the provision of pre-hospital cardiac care by physicians in Belfast, Northern Ireland, in 1966. This was repeated in Toronto, Canada in 1968 using a single ambulance called Cardiac One, which was staffed by a regular ambulance crew, along with a hospital intern to perform the advanced procedures. While both of these experiments had certain levels of success, the technology had not yet reached a sufficiently advanced level to be fully effective; for example, the Toronto portable defibrillator and heart monitor was powered by lead-acid car batteries, and weighed around 45 kilograms (99 lb).

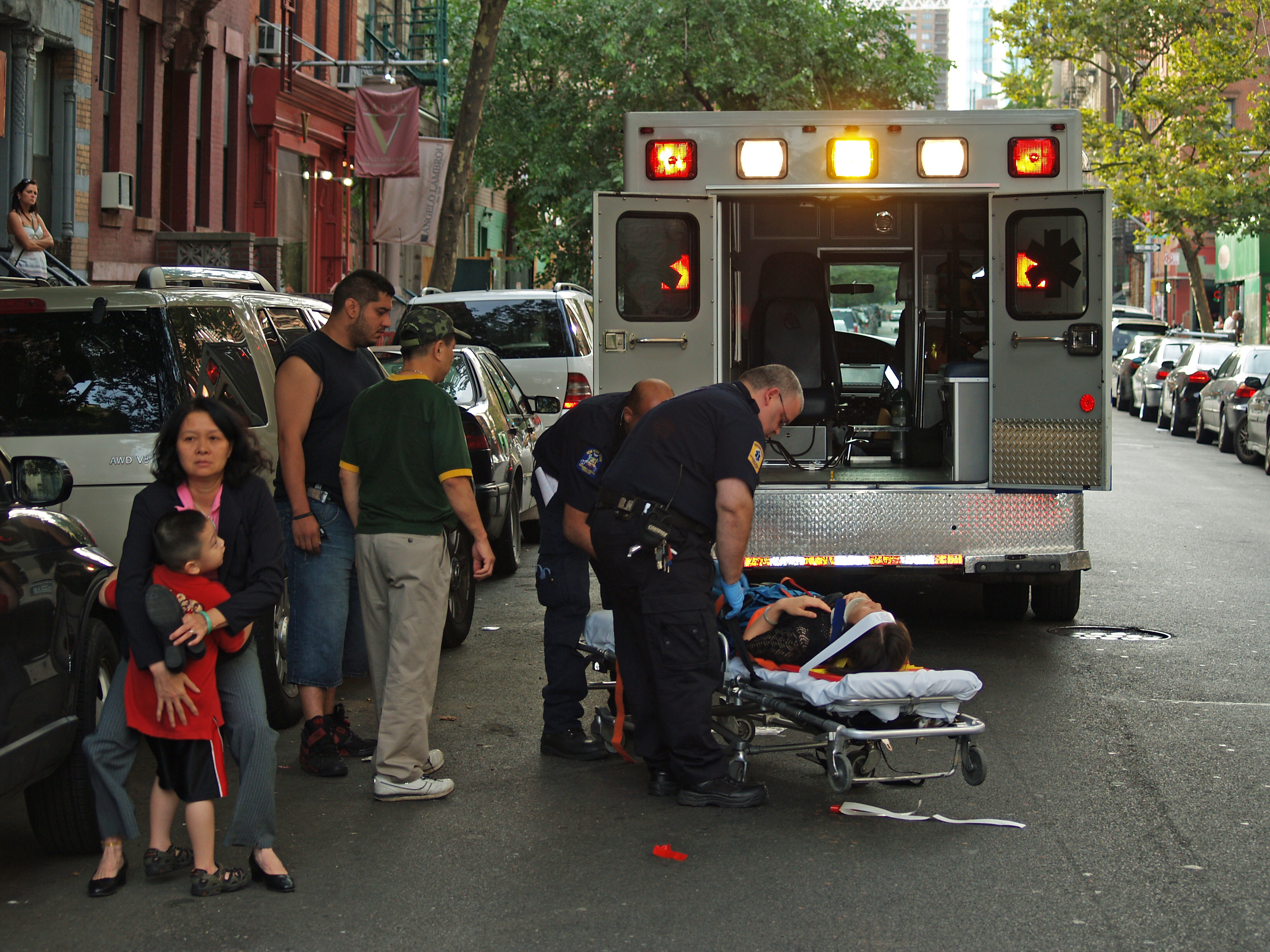
EMTs caring for a collapsed woman in New York

In 1966, a report called Accidental Death and Disability: The Neglected Disease of Modern Society—commonly known as The White Paper—was published in the United States. This paper presented data showing that soldiers who were seriously wounded on the battlefields during the Vietnam War had a better survival rate than people who were seriously injured in motor vehicle accidents on California's freeways. Key factors contributing to victim survival in transport to definitive care such as a hospital were identified as comprehensive trauma care, rapid transport to designated trauma facilities, and the presence of medical corpsmen who were trained to perform certain critical advanced medical procedures such as fluid replacement and airway management.

As a result of The White Paper, the US government moved to develop minimum standards for ambulance training, ambulance equipment and vehicle design. These new standards were incorporated into Federal Highway Safety legislation and the states were advised to either adopt these standards into state laws or risk a reduction in Federal highway safety funding. The "White Paper" also prompted the inception of a number of emergency medical service (EMS) pilot units across the US including paramedic programs. The success of these units led to a rapid transition to make them fully operational.

Founded in 1967, Freedom House Ambulance Service was the first civilian emergency medical service in the United States to be staffed by paramedics, most of whom were Black. New York City's Saint Vincent's Hospital developed the United States' first Mobile Coronary Care Unit (MCCU) under the medical direction of William Grace, MD, and based on Frank Pantridge's MCCU project in Belfast, Northern Ireland. In 1967, Eugene Nagle, MD and Jim Hirschmann, MD helped pioneer the United States' first EKG telemetry transmission to a hospital and then in 1968, a functional paramedic program in conjunction with the City of Miami Fire Department. In 1969, the City of Columbus Fire Department joined with the Ohio State University Medical Center to develop the "HEARTMOBILE" paramedic program under the medical direction of James Warren, MD and Richard Lewis, MD. In 1969, the Haywood County (NC) Volunteer Rescue Squad developed a paramedic program (then called Mobile Intensive Care Technicians) under the medical direction of Ralph Feichter, MD. In 1969, the initial Los Angeles paramedic training program was instituted in conjunction with Harbor General Hospital, now Harbor–UCLA Medical Center, under the medical direction of J. Michael Criley, MD and James Lewis, MD. In 1969, the Seattle "Medic 1" paramedic program was developed in conjunction with the Harborview Medical Center under the medical direction of Leonard Cobb, MD. The Marietta (GA) initial paramedic project was instituted in the Fall of 1970 in conjunction with Kennestone Hospital and Metro Ambulance Service, Inc. under the medical direction of Luther Fortson, MD. The Los Angeles County and City established paramedic programs following the passage of The Wedsworth-Townsend Act in 1970. Other cities and states passed their own paramedic bills, leading to the formation of services across the US. Many other countries also followed suit, and paramedic units formed around the world.

In the military, however, the required telemetry and miniaturization technologies were more advanced, particularly due to initiatives such as the space program. It would take several more years before these technologies drifted through to civilian applications. In North America, physicians were judged to be too expensive to be used in the pre-hospital setting, although such initiatives were implemented, and sometimes still operate, in European countries and Latin America.

=== Public notability ===
While doing background research at Los Angeles' UCLA Harbor Medical Center for a proposed new show about doctors, television producer Robert A. Cinader, working for Jack Webb, happened to encounter "firemen who spoke like doctors and worked with them". This concept developed into the television series Emergency!, which ran from 1972 to 1977, portraying the exploits of this new profession called paramedics. The show gained popularity with emergency services personnel, the medical community, and the general public. When the show first aired in 1972, there were just six paramedic units operating in three pilot programs in the whole of the US, and the term paramedic was essentially unknown. By the time the program ended in 1977, there were paramedics operating in all fifty states. The show's technical advisor, James O. Page, was a pioneer of paramedicine and responsible for the UCLA paramedic program; he would go on to help establish paramedic programs throughout the US, and was the founding publisher of the Journal of Emergency Medical Services (JEMS). The JEMS magazine creation resulted from Page's previous purchase of the PARAMEDICS International magazine. Ron Stewart, the show's medical director, was instrumental in organizing emergency health services in southern California earlier in his career during the 1970s, in the paramedic program in Pittsburgh, and had a substantial role in the founding of the paramedic programs in Toronto and Nova Scotia, Canada.

=== Evolution and growth ===
Throughout the 1970s and 1980s, the paramedic field continued to evolve, with a shift in emphasis from patient transport to treatment both on scene and en route to hospitals. This led to some services changing their descriptions from "ambulance services" to "emergency medical services".

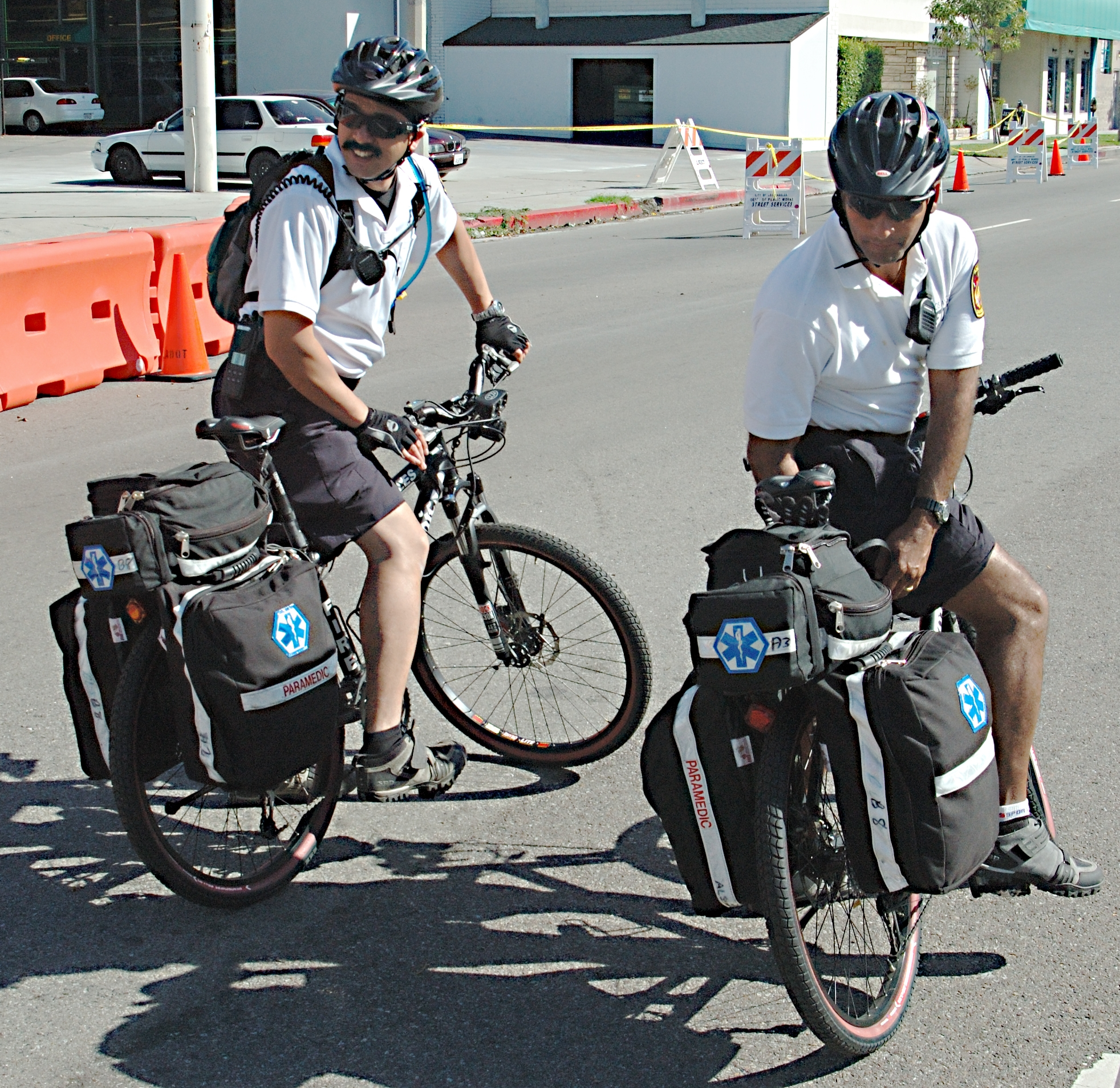
Bicycle paramedics in Los Angeles indicate the changing nature of the job.

The training, knowledge-base, and skill sets of both paramedics and emergency medical technicians (EMTs) were typically determined by local medical directors based primarily on the perceived needs of the community along with affordability. There were also large differences between localities in the amount and type of training required, and how it would be provided. This ranged from in-service training in local systems, through community colleges, and up to university level education. This emphasis on increasing qualifications has followed the progression of other health professions such as nursing, which also progressed from on the job training to university level qualifications.

The variations in educational approaches and standards required for paramedics has led to large differences in the required qualifications between locations—both within individual countries and from country to country. Within the UK training is a three-year course equivalent to a bachelor's degree. Comparisons have been made between paramedics and nurses; with nurses now requiring degree entry (BSc) the knowledge deficit is large between the two fields. This has led to many countries passing laws to protect the title of "paramedic" (or its local equivalent) from use by anyone except those qualified and experienced to a defined standard. This usually means that paramedics must be registered with the appropriate body in their country; for example all paramedics in the United Kingdom must by registered with the Health and Care Professions Council (HCPC) in order to call themselves a paramedic. In the United States, a similar system is operated by the National Registry of Emergency Medical Technicians (NREMT), although this is only accepted by forty of the fifty states.

As paramedicine has evolved, a great deal of both the curriculum and skill set has existed in a state of flux. Requirements often originated and evolved at the local level, and were based upon the preferences of physician advisers and medical directors. Recommended treatments would change regularly, often changing more like a fashion than a scientific discipline. Associated technologies also rapidly evolved and changed, with medical equipment manufacturers having to adapt equipment that worked inadequately outside of hospitals, to be able to cope with the less controlled pre-hospital environment.

Physicians began to take more interest in paramedics from a research perspective as well. By about 1990, the fluctuating trends began to diminish, being replaced by outcomes-based research. This research then drove further evolution of the practice of both paramedics and the emergency physicians who oversaw their work, with changes to procedures and protocols occurring only after significant research demonstrated their need and effectiveness (an example being ALS). Such changes affected everything from simple procedures such as CPR, to changes in drug protocols. As the profession grew, some paramedics went on to become not just research participants, but researchers in their own right, with their own projects and journal publications. In 2010, the American Board of Emergency Medicine created a medical subspecialty for physicians who work in emergency medical services.

Changes in procedures also included the manner in which the work of paramedics was overseen and managed. In the early days medical control and oversight was direct and immediate, with paramedics calling into a local hospital and receiving orders for every individual procedure or drug. While this still occurs in some jurisdictions, it has become increasingly rare. Day-to-day operations largely moved from direct and immediate medical control to pre-written protocols or standing orders, with the paramedic typically seeking advice after the options in the standing orders had been exhausted.

==== Canada ====
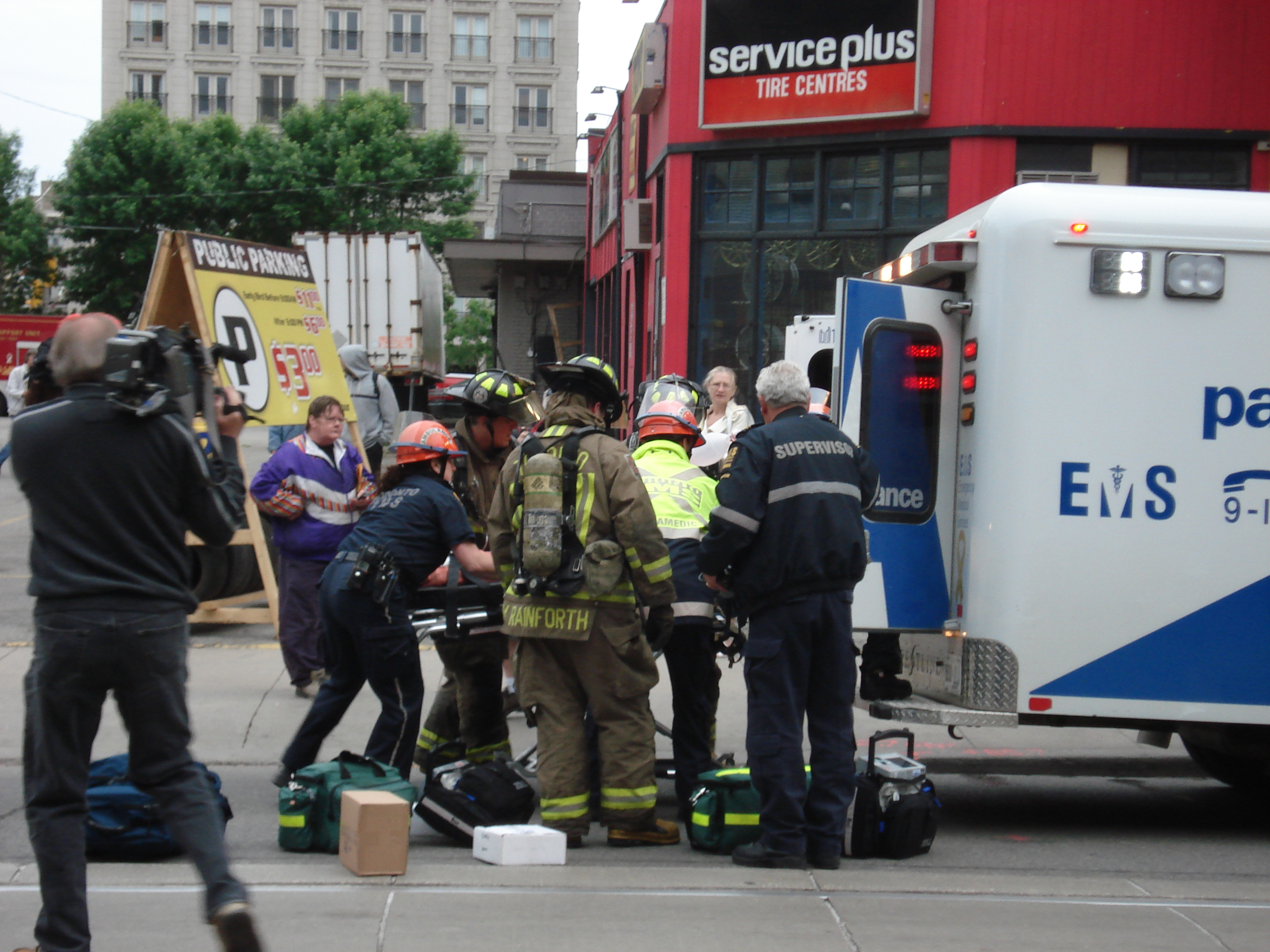
Firefighters assist while paramedics from the Toronto Paramedic Services load a patient into an ambulance.

While the evolution of paramedicine described above is focused largely on the US, many other countries followed a similar pattern, although often with significant variations. Canada, for example, attempted a pilot paramedic training program at Queen's University, Kingston, Ontario, in 1972. The program, which intended to upgrade the then mandatory 160 hours of training for ambulance attendants, was found to be too costly and premature. The program was abandoned after two years, and it was more than a decade before the legislative authority for its graduates to practice was put into place. An alternative program which provided 1,400 hours of training at the community college level prior to commencing employment was then tried, and made mandatory in 1977, with formal certification examinations being introduced in 1978. Similar programs occurred at roughly the same time in Alberta and British Columbia, with other Canadian provinces gradually following, but with their own education and certification requirements. Advanced Care Paramedics were not introduced until 1984, when Toronto trained its first group internally, before the process spread across the country. By 2010 the Ontario system involved a two-year community college based program, including both hospital and field clinical components, prior to designation as a Primary Care Paramedic, although it is starting to head towards a university degree-based program. The province of Ontario announced that by September 2021, the entry level primary care paramedic post-secondary program would be enhanced from a two-year diploma to a three-year advanced diploma in primary care paramedicine. Resultantly, advanced care paramedics in Ontario will require a minimum of four years of post-secondary education and critical care paramedics will require five years of post-secondary education.

==== Israel ====
In Israel, paramedics are trained in either of the following ways: a three-year degree in Emergency Medicine (B.EMS), a year and three months IDF training, or MADA training. Paramedics manage and provide medical guidelines in mass casualty incidents. They operate in MED evac and ambulances. They are legalized under the 1976 Doctors Ordinance (Decree). In a 2016 study at the Ben Gurion University of the Negev it was found that 73% of trained paramedics stop working within a five-year period, and 93% stop treating within 10 years.

==== United Kingdom ====
In the United Kingdom, ambulances were originally municipal services after the end of World War II. Training was frequently conducted internally, although national levels of coordination led to more standardization of staff training. Ambulance services were merged into county-level agencies in 1974, and then into regional agencies in 2006. The regional ambulance services, most often trusts, are under the authority of the National Health Service and there is now a significant standardization of training and skills. The UK model has three levels of emergency ambulance staff. In increasing order of clinical skill these are: emergency care assistants, emergency medical technicians, and paramedics.

Today, university qualifications are expected for paramedics, with the current entry level being a Bachelor of Science degree in Pre-Hospital Care or Paramedic Science. As the title "paramedic" is legally protected, they must be registered with the Health and Care Professions Council (HCPC), Additional qualifications, such as a masters degree in Advanced or Paramedic Practice, are a pre-requisite for paramedic prescribing, which has been permitted since government legislation was introduced in 2018.

Paramedics work in various settings such as NHS and independent ambulance providers, air ambulances and emergency departments. Some paramedics have gone on to become paramedic practitioners, a role that practices independently in the pre-hospital environment in a capacity similar to that of a nurse practitioner. This is a fully autonomous role, and such senior paramedics are now working in hospitals, community teams such as rapid response teams, and also in increasing numbers in general practice, where their role includes acute presentations, complex chronic care and end of life management. Critical care paramedics specialise in acute emergency incidents.

==== United States ====
In the United States, the minimum standards for paramedic training is considered vocational, but many colleges offer paramedic associate degree or bachelor's degree options. Paramedic education programs typically follow the U.S. NHTSA EMS Curriculum, DOT or National Registry of EMTs. While many regionally accredited community colleges offer paramedic programs and two-year associate degrees, a handful of universities also offer a four-year bachelor's degree component. The national standard course minimum requires didactic and clinical hours for a paramedic program of 1,500 or more hours of classroom training and 500+ clinical hours to be accredited and nationally recognized. Calendar length typically varies from 12 months to upwards of two years, excluding degree options, EMT training, work experience, and prerequisites. It is required to be a certified Emergency Medical Technician prior to starting paramedic training. Entry requirements vary, but many paramedic programs also have prerequisites such as one year required work experience as an emergency medical technician, or anatomy and physiology courses from an accredited college or university. Paramedics in some states must attend up to 50+ hours of ongoing education, plus maintain Pediatric Advanced Life Support and Advanced Cardiac Life Support. National Registry requires 70 + hours to maintain its certification or one may re-certify through completing the written computer based adaptive testing again (between 90 and 120 questions) every two years.

Paramedicine continues to grow and evolve into a formal profession in its own right, complete with its own standards and body of knowledge, and in many locations paramedics have formed their own professional bodies.

The early technicians with limited training, performing a small and specific set of procedures, has become a role beginning to require a foundation degree in countries such as Australia, South Africa, the UK, and increasingly in Canada and parts of the U.S. such as Oregon, where a degree is required for entry level practice.

==== Ukraine ====
As a part of Emergency Medicine Reform in 2017 Ministry of Healthcare introduced two specialties — "paramedic" and "emergency medical technician".

== Structure of employment ==
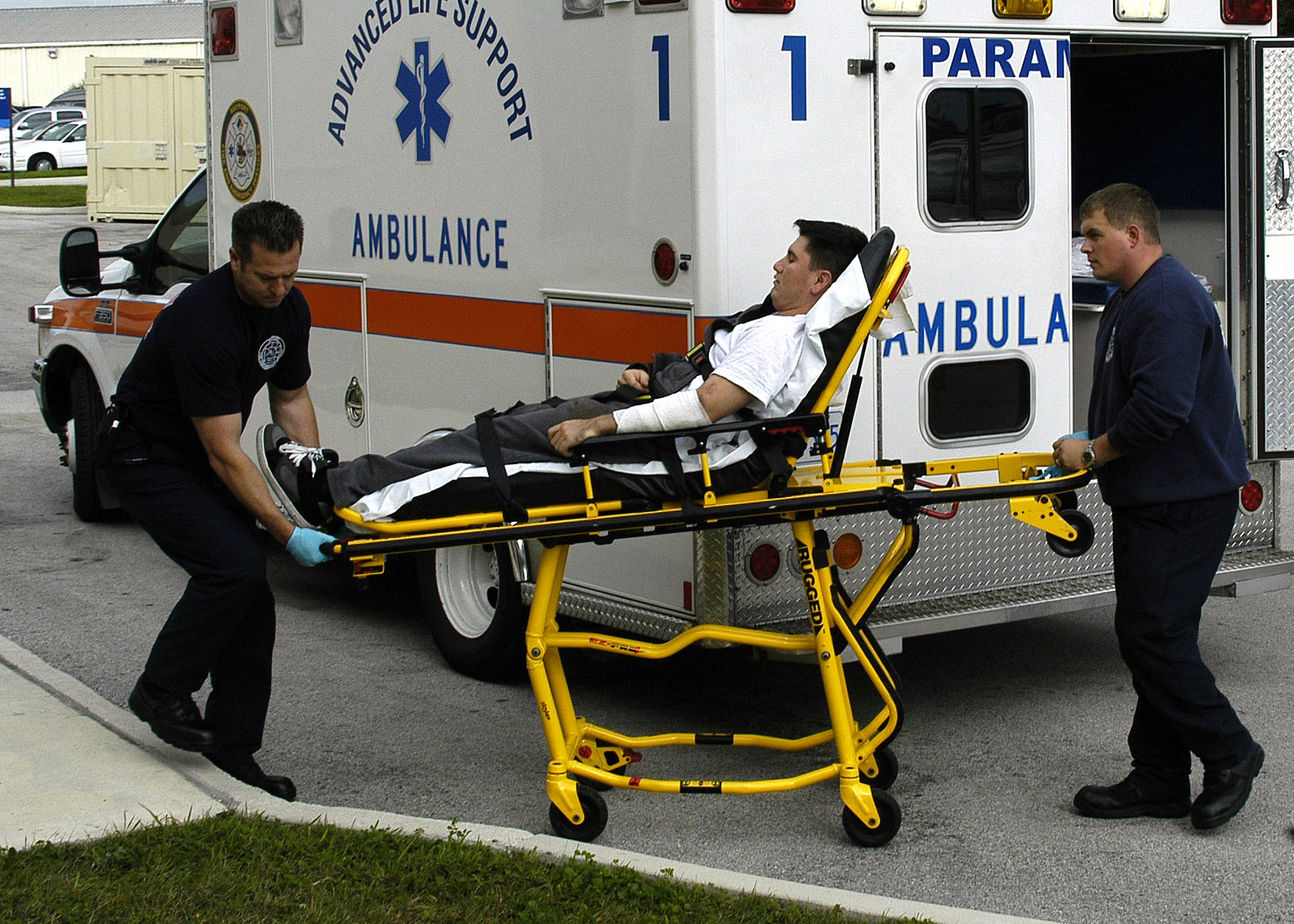
Firefighter paramedics assist a simulated burn victim during a US Navy mass casualty drill.

Paramedics are employed by a variety of different organizations, and the services they provide may occur under differing organizational structures, depending on the part of the world. A new and evolving role for paramedics involves the expansion of their practice into the provision of relatively basic primary health care and assessment services.

Some paramedics have begun to specialize their practice, frequently in association with the environment in which they will work. Some early examples of this involved aviation medicine and the use of helicopters, and the transfer of critical care patients between facilities. While some jurisdictions still use physicians, nurses, and technicians for transporting patients, increasingly this role falls to specialized senior and experienced paramedics. Other areas of specialization include such roles as tactical paramedics working in police units, marine paramedics, hazardous materials (Hazmat) teams, Heavy Urban Search and Rescue, and paramedics on offshore oil platforms, oil and mineral exploration teams, and in the military.

The majority of paramedics are employed by the emergency medical service for their area, although this employer could itself be working under a number of models, including a specific autonomous public ambulance service, a fire department, a hospital based service, or a private company working under contract. In Washington, firefighters have been offered free paramedic training. There are also many paramedics who volunteer for backcountry or wilderness rescue teams, and small town rescue squads. In the specific case of an ambulance service being maintained by a fire department, paramedics and EMTs may be required to maintain firefighting and rescue skills as well as medical skills, and vice versa. In some instances, such as Los Angeles County, a fire department may provide emergency medical services, but as a rapid response or rescue unit rather than a transport ambulance.

The provision of municipal ambulance services and paramedics, can vary by area, even within the same country or state. For instance, in Canada, the province of British Columbia operates a province-wide service (the British Columbia Ambulance Service) whereas in Ontario, the service is provided by each municipality, either as a distinct service, linked to the fire service, or contracted out to a third party.

== Scope of practice ==
=== Common skills ===
While there are varying degrees of training and expectations around the world, a set of skills practised by paramedics in the pre-hospital setting commonly includes:

- Advanced cardiac life support, or ACLS, including cardiopulmonary resuscitation, defibrillation, cardioversion, transcutaneous pacing, and administration of cardiac drugs
- Patient assessment, including acquisition of vital signs, physical exam, chest auscultation, history taking, electrocardiogram acquisition and interpretation, capnography, pulse oximetry, point-of-care ultrasound and basic blood chemistry interpretation (glucose, lactate)
- Airway management techniques including tracheal intubation, cricothyrotomy, rapid sequence induction, supraglottic airway insertion, manual repositioning, sterile suctioning, use of oropharyngeal and nasopharyngeal airway adjuncts, and manual removal of obstructions via direct laryngoscopy and use of magill forceps
- Thorocostomy and pericardiocentesis to relieve pneumothorax and pericardial tamponade
- Intravenous (IV) and intraosseous (IO) cannulation
- Oxygen administration and positive pressure ventilation via bag-valve-mask, CPAP device, or ventilator
- Fluid resuscitation
- Administration of emergency drugs/medications (see section below)
- Bleeding control and management of shock
- Spinal injury management, including immobilization and safe transport
- Fracture management, including assessment, splinting, and dislocation reduction
- Obstetrics, including assessment, childbirth, and recognition of and procedures for obstetrical emergencies such as breech presentation, cord presentation, and placental abruption
- Management of burns, including classification, estimate of surface area, recognition of more serious burns, and treatment
- Triage of patients in a mass casualty incident
- Surgical procedures such as field amputation, escharotomy, or thorocotomy (if trained and credentialed)

=== Emergency pharmacology ===
Paramedics carry and administer a wide array of emergency medications. The specific medications they are permitted to administer vary widely, based on local standards of care and protocols. For an accurate description of permitted drugs or procedures in a given location, it is necessary to contact that jurisdiction directly. A representative list of medications may commonly include:

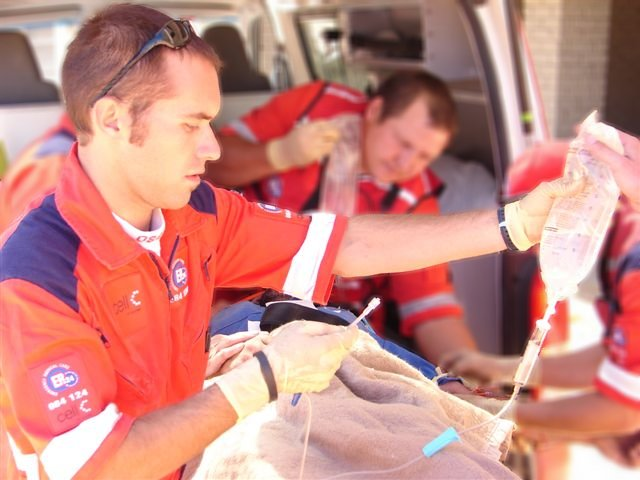
A paramedic preparing an intravenous infusion for a patient

- Analgesic medications such as aspirin, ketorolac and paracetamol (acetaminophen), used to relieve pain or decrease nausea and vomiting
- Narcotics like morphine, pethidine, fentanyl, and methoxyflurane, used to treat severe pain.
- Beta and calcium channel blockers such as diltiazem, metoprolol and verapamil used to slow down excessively high heart rates or severe hypertension
- Parasympatholytic drug such as Atropine, also known as anticholinergic drugs, used to speed up slow bradycardic heart rates
- Sympathomimetics such as dopamine, dobutamine, norepinephrine, and epinephrine used for cardiac arrest, severe hypotension (low blood pressure), shock and sepsis. These are often known as "vasoactive" agents.
- Dextrose (often D50W, a solution of 50% dextrose in water), used to treat hypoglycemia (low blood sugar)
- Sedatives like midazolam, lorazepam, etomidate, and ketamine used to reduce the irritability or agitation of patients, to relieve symptoms of seizure, or provide procedural sedation
- Paralytics such as succinylcholine, rocuronium, and vecuronium, used when an emergency procedure such as rapid sequence intubation (RSI) is required
- Antipsychotics like haloperidol or ziprasidone, used to sedate combative patients
- Respiratory medications such as albuterol and ipratropium bromide used to treat conditions such as asthma and acute bronchitis
- Steroids such as hydrocortisone and methylprednisolone used to treat inflammatory respiratory conditions and adrenal crisis
- Cardiac medications such as nitroglycerin and aspirin are used to treat cardiac ailments such as angina and myocardial infarctions
- Diuretic medications such as furosemide to treat congestive heart failure and severe hypertension
- Antiarrhythmics such as amiodarone, adenosine, lidocaine and magnesium sulfate used to treat abnormal heart rhythms such as ventricular tachycardia and ventricular fibrillation
- Antiemetics such as promethazine or ondansetron used for nausea and vomiting
- Antidotes for a variety of toxins such as naloxone (opioids), pralidoxime (organophosphates), sodium bicarbonate (tricyclic antidepressants), and hydroxocobalamin (cyanide).
- Blood products and tranexamic acid in cases of hemorrhagic shock
- Broad spectrum antibiotics such as ceftriaxone or vancomycin for cases of sepsis
- Hormones like oxytocin to control post-partum bleeding

=== Skills by certification level ===
As described above, many jurisdictions have different levels of paramedic training, leading to variations in what procedures different paramedics may perform depending upon their qualifications. Three common general divisions of paramedic training are the basic technician, general paramedic or advanced technician, and advanced paramedic. Common skills that these three certification levels may practice are summarized in the table below. The skills for the higher levels automatically also assume those listed for lower levels.

Treatment issue	Basic Life Support (BLS) Provider Emergency Medical Technician – United States (120–200 hours education) Emergency Medical Responder – Canada (80 hours education)	Intermediate Life Support (ILS) Provider Advanced EMT – United States (3–6 months education) Paramedic – Australia (Bachelor's Degree) Primary Care Paramedic – Canada (2–3 year education)	Advanced Life Support (ALS) Provider Paramedic – United States (1–2 year education) Intensive Care Paramedic – Australia (Master's Degree) Advanced Care Paramedic – Canada (4 year education)
Airway management	Assessment, manual repositioning, oropharyngeal and nasopharyngeal airway adjuncts, manual removal of obstructions, suctioning	Use of supraglottic airway devices such as the I-Gel or King-LT airway	Endotracheal intubation, cricothyrotomy (surgical airway), delayed and rapid sequence induction (in some jurisdictions), use of magill forceps, airway suctioning.
Breathing	Assessment (rate, effort, symmetry, skin color), obstructed airway maneuver, supplemental oxygen administration by nasal cannula, rebreathing and non-rebreathing mask, positive pressure ventilation by bag valve mask (BVM).	CPAP	Decompression of tension pneumothorax by needle or incision thoracostomy, BIPAP, use of mechanical transport ventilators.
Circulation	Control of hemorrhage using direct and indirect pressure, tourniquets, wound packing and hemostatic agents, basic shock management and hypothermia prevention, pelvic binding.	IV fluid resuscitation.	Intraosseous (IO) cannulation (placement of needle into marrow space of a large bone), central venous access (using central venous catheter by way of external jugular or subclavian), pericardiocentesis.
Cardiac arrest	Cardiopulmonary resuscitation, basic airway adjuncts, suctioning, BVM ventilation, semi-automatic defibrillation.	Expanded resuscitation skills including supraglottic airway placement, monitoring of capnography, administration of epinephrine/adrenaline (in some jurisdictions).	Expanded drug therapy options (epinephrine, anti-arrhythmics), ECG interpretation, manual defibrillation, intubation, ultrasound.
Cardiac Monitoring	Placement of ECGs electrodes and ability to transmit to hospital for interpretation.	Twelve lead ECG monitoring and interpretation	Advanced ECG interpretation
Drug administration	Oral, nebulized, and intramuscular injection of a limited list of drugs	limited list of drugs for intramuscular, subcutaneous, intravenous injection (bolus), intravenous drip, and transdermal.	Infusion pump and intraosseous access.
Drug types permitted	Low-risk and immediate requirements, e.g., aspirin and nitroglycerin (chest pain), oral glucose and glucagon (hypoglycemia), epinephrine (anaphylaxis or respiratory failure), albuterol (asthma), and naloxone (narcotic overdose).	Intravenous fluids, dextrose infusion (hypoglycemia), and symptom relief medications such as ondansetron (nausea), dipenhydramine (pruritus), and non-narcotic pain management (nitrous oxide, methoxyflurane, ketorolac, acetaminophen).	Significantly expanded drug list, most commonly narcotics, sedatives, vasopressors, antidotes, neuromuscular blockers, and advanced cardiac and respiratory medications. In some jurisdictions, paramedics may also permitted to administer blood products, tranexamic acid, and antibiotics.
Patient assessment	Basic physical assessment, vital signs, history taking, lung auscultation, pulse oximetry.	More detailed physical assessment and history, capnography.	Advanced assessment, 4 and 12-lead ECG interpretation, ultrasound, point-of-care blood chemistry interpretation (glucose, lactate, hemoglobin, troponin).
Other procedures	Splinting of bone fractures, uncomplicated and complicated childbirth.		Wound closure (butterfly stitches, suturing), fracture/dislocation reduction, umbilical venous access, chemically facilitated extrication, emergency surgical procedures such as escharotomy or field amputation (in some jurisdictions).

== Medicolegal authority ==
The medicolegal framework for paramedics is highly dependent on the overall structure of emergency medical services in the territory where they are working.

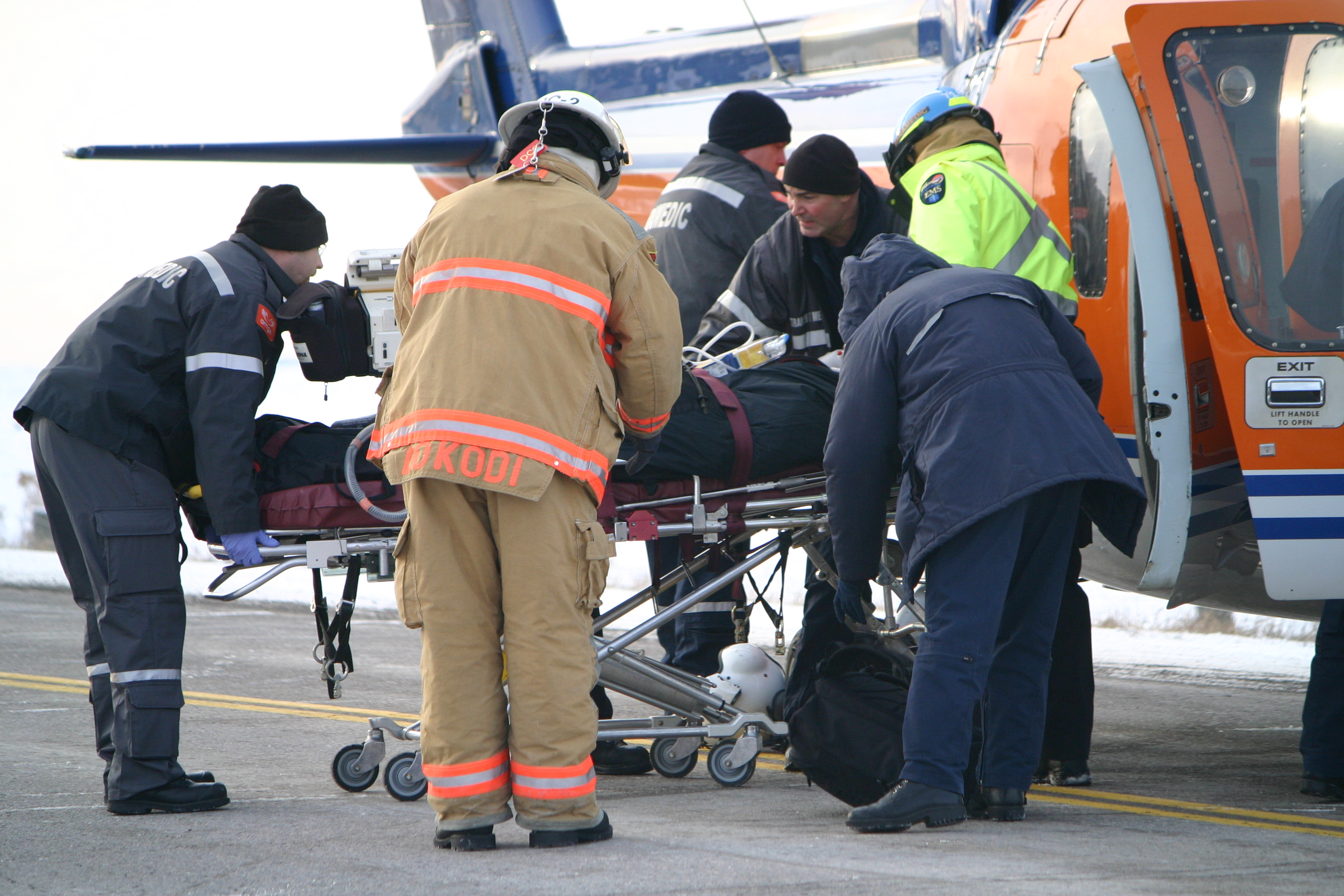
Paramedics load an injured woman into an air ambulance after a head-on collision in the Kawartha Lakes region of Ontario, Canada.

In many localities, paramedics operate as a direct extension of a physician medical director and practice as an extension of the medical director's license. In the United States, a physician delegates authority under an individual state's Medical Practice Act. This gives a paramedic the ability to practice within limited scope of practice in law, along with state DOH guidelines and medical control oversight. The authority to practice in this manner is granted in the form of standing orders (protocols) (off-line medical control) and direct physician consultation via phone or radio (on-line medical control). Under this paradigm, paramedics effectively assume the role of out-of-hospital field agents to regional emergency physicians, with independent clinical decision.

In places where paramedics are recognised health care professionals registered with an appropriate body, they can conduct all procedures authorised for their profession, including the administration of prescription medication, and are personally answerable to a regulator. For example, in the United Kingdom, the Health and Care Professions Council regulates paramedics and can censure or strike a paramedic from the register.

In some cases paramedics may gain further qualifications to extend their status to that of a paramedic practitioner or advanced paramedic, which may allow them to administer a wider range of drugs and use a wider range of clinical skills.

In some areas, paramedics are only permitted to practice many advanced skills while assisting a physician who is physically present, except for immediately life-threatening emergencies.

== See also ==
Paramedics by country

- Paramedics in Australia
- Paramedics in Canada
- Paramedics in France
- Paramedics in Germany
- Paramedics in Ireland
- Paramedics in South Africa
- Paramedics in the United Kingdom
- Paramedics in the United States

Related fields

- Biophone
- Field medic
- Flight Paramedic
- Health care providers
- National Association of Emergency Medical Technicians
- National Registry of Emergency Medical Technicians

Other

- Feldsher
- List of EMS provider credentials
