= Emergency Care Practitioner =

An Emergency Care Practitioner (ECP) generally come from a background in paramedicine and most have additional academic qualifications, usually at university, with enhanced skills in medical assessment and extra clinical skills over and above those of a standard paramedic or qualified nurse. It has been recommended by the College of Paramedics that ECPs be trained to PgDip or MSc level, although not all are. Evidence of the best way to target Emergency Care Practitioners is limited with utilisation of traditional Ambulance dispatch codes not always being shown to be most effective and referrals from GPs also potentially failing to deliver management of demand that would be appropriate for this different level of practitioner. Evidence however clearly demonstrates that in discreet groups of patients the use of these extended role staff responding to emergency calls can reduce admissions and thus improve patient outcomes as well as delivering a clear cost saving to the NHS.

== Employment ==
ECPs may be employed in a range of areas of care such as emergency medical services, primary care centres, hospitals, prisons, walk-in centres, or out-of-hours medical centres. The majority of ECPs work autonomously. Many are employed by Primary Care Trusts or Ambulance Services. The work of the ECP appears to be recognised as a valuable asset in many care arenas with the current trend of employment within primary care practices becoming more prevalent.

== Education and training ==
=== United Kingdom ===
ECPs in the United Kingdom are educated to different levels. In some areas a BSc or Post Graduate Certificate (PgC) makes one an ECP while in other areas an MSc may be needed. ECP's are educated to provide less comprehensive services than a physician, physician associate or nurse practitioner, however are ideal for acute non urgent situations.

More recently, as the role of the paramedic has developed, and advanced practice in the NHS has become more widely recognised and standardised, the role of Emergency Care Practitioner has evolved and been replaced. Allied healthcare professionals (such as nurses and paramedics) are now able to undertake postgraduate training to become Advanced Clinical Practitioners, working in NHS emergency departments and primary care settings. Paramedics choosing to remain in the ambulance service can train to become Advanced Paramedics, specialising in Urgent Care or Critical Care.

=== South Africa ===
ECPs in South Africa are educated from the level of BHSc EMC (Bachelor of Health Science in Emergency Medical Care; B.EMC (Bachelor of Emergency Medical Care) or the older BTech EMC (Bachelor of Technology in Emergency Medical Care) - each of which requires 4 years full-time study or an additional 1-2 year part-time study for those already in possession of a National Diploma in Emergency Medical Care - (N.Dip EMC) up to the level of PhD EMC by thesis. The only four institutions offering the qualification are:

- Nelson Mandela University, Port Elizabeth
- Durban University of Technology, Durban
- Cape Peninsula University of Technology, Cape Town
- University of Johannesburg, Johannesburg

== Skills ==
=== United Kingdom ===
Additional skills which UK ECPs may perform include:

- Administration and supply of a wide range of medications for conditions encountered in the urgent and emergency care setting. Some ECP's can independently prescribe, allowing for greater autonomy.
- Suturing, Steri-Strips (adhesive skin closure strips), and tissue adhesive wound closure (gluing of wounds)
- Minor surgical procedures in the field (such as removal of skin flaps)
- Urinary catheterization (placing a Foley catheter.)
- Full diagnostics assessment (Otoscopy, ophthalmoscopy, urinalysis, reflexes, system based assessments)
- Requesting X-rays and requesting further investigations
- Interpreting X-ray and blood results
- Thrombolysis

=== South Africa ===
ECP skills in South Africa include:

- Full South African, adult and paediatric, advanced life support skills
- Full diagnostics assessment (Otoscopy, ophthalmoscopy, urinalysis, system based assessments)
- Thrombolysis, fibrinolysis
- Rapid Sequence Intubation (RSI)
- On-scene discharge
- Administration of emergency medications
- Ordering X-rays and requesting further investigations
- Specialised intensive care unit transport of adults and paediatrics

South African ECPs are also required to complete several medical rescue training modules during their studies such as high angle rescue, light motor vehicle rescue and aquatic rescue.

=== Emerging roles and opportunities ===
Since around 2008, the role of the ECP has become more popular around the world as the demonstrable benefits of the role become apparent.

As a result, the role has now expanded to parts of New Zealand and Australia. All of these are largely based on the UK model.

== See also ==
- Clinical officer
- Emergency medical services in the United Kingdom
- Emergency medical services in South Africa
- Emergency medical services
- Paramedic
