= East Midlands Ambulance Service =

UK public sector ambulance service for the East Midlands region of England

- EMAS

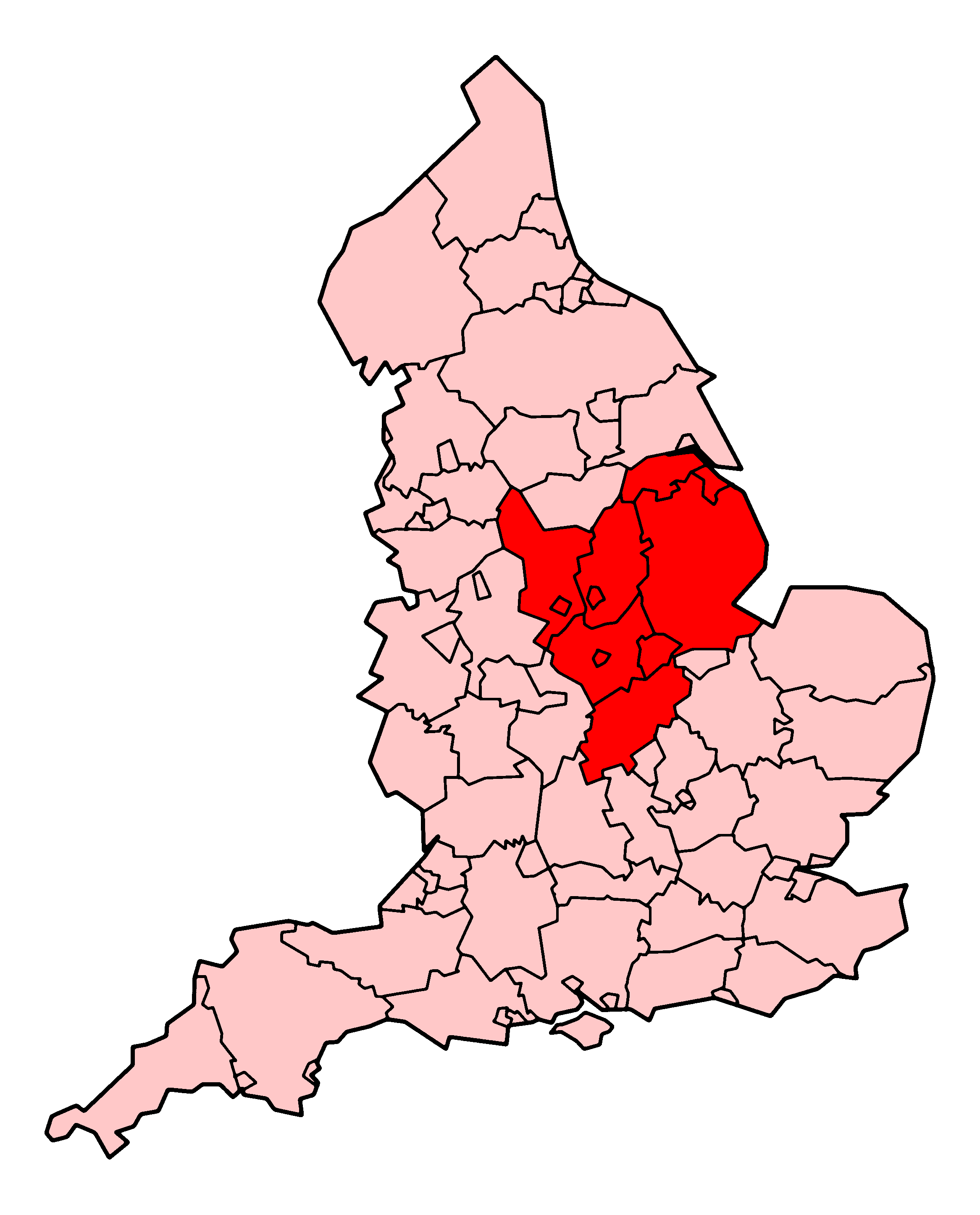
- Area served by East Midlands Ambulance Service NHS Trust
- Type: Ambulance services trust
- Established: 1999
- Headquarters: Nottingham, Nottinghamshire
- Region served: Nottinghamshire, Derbyshire (excluding northern areas of the High Peak district), Leicestershire, Rutland, Lincolnshire and Northamptonshire
- Area size: 6,425 sq miles
- Population: 4.8 million
- Establishments: 70 sites including two control rooms
- Budget: £158 million (2017/18)
- Chair: Jeff Worrall
- Chief executive: Richard Henderson
- Website: www.emas.nhs.uk

The East Midlands Ambulance Service NHS Trust (EMAS) provides emergency medical services, urgent care and patient transport services for the 4.8 million people within the East Midlands region of the UK - covering Nottinghamshire, Derbyshire (except Glossop, Hadfield and Tintwistle in the High Peak district), Leicestershire, Rutland, Lincolnshire (including North Lincolnshire and North East Lincolnshire) and Northamptonshire. It was formed in 1999 by amalgamating several county ambulance services, and in July 2006 was dissolved and reformed under the same name as part of a nationwide reorganisation of ambulance service provision.

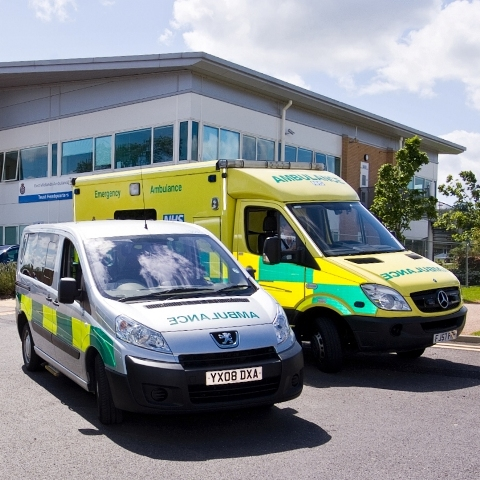
Two of the vehicles operated by the East Midlands Ambulance Service NHS Trust

== Performance ==
In 2016–17, EMAS received over 938,837 emergency 999 calls with ambulance clinicians dispatched to 653,215 incidents.

EMAS employs about 3,290 staff at more than 70 locations, including two control rooms at Nottingham and Lincoln - the largest staff group are those who provide accident and emergency responses to 999 calls.

In 2013, EMAS took on 140 new emergency care assistants. In 2014, EMAS announced they were bringing back the ambulance technician role.

In 2010–11, EMAS missed key performance targets after a cold spell brought snow and ice. By June 2015, EMAS had failed to meet their category 1 response times for the fifth successive year.

In December 2019, ambulance staff spent 13,057 hours waiting at hospitals for the pre-handover of patients, more than double the time spend in December 2018.

=== CQC performance rating ===
In its last inspection of the service in April 2019, the Care Quality Commission (CQC) gave the following ratings on a scale of outstanding (the service is performing exceptionally well), good (the service is performing well and meeting our expectations), requires improvement (the service isn't performing as well as it should) and inadequate (the service is performing badly):

Inspection Reports
Area	2016 Rating	2017 Rating	2019 Rating
Are services Safe?	Inadequate	Requires improvement	Good
Are services Effective?	Requires improvement	Requires improvement	Good
Are services Caring?	Outstanding	N/A	Outstanding
Are services Responsive?	Good	N/A	Good
Are services Well-led?	Requires improvement	Requires improvement	Good
Overall rating	Requires improvement	Requires improvement	Good

== Funding ==
EMAS previously provided patient transport services until contracts worth £20 million per year were taken over in 2012 by two private sector companies. In 2012−13, EMAS had a budget of £148M. The trust spent £4.3M on voluntary and private ambulance services in 2013–14 for support in busy periods.

In 2015, the service also faced a drop in annual funding of around £6M.

In October 2014, the trust decided to spend £88,000 on upgrading its computer equipment.

In 2018, the trust said it would need an extra £20M a year to meet the new ambulance performance standards.

== Controversy ==
In 2022 "demoralised and downtrodden" staff strike.

In 2023, the service were criticised for quoting a 6 hour wait time for an emergency response for an unwell child who went into cardiac arrest.

== See also ==
- Emergency medical services in the United Kingdom
