= Emergency care assistant =

Type of emergency medical service worker in the United Kingdom

An emergency care assistant (ECA) is a member of the ambulance crew in the United Kingdom who works alongside paramedics to respond to emergency incidents. The scope of their duties varies by ambulance service, but typically involves supporting the paramedics both on scene and during transport. ECAs are trained in emergency response driving to reach the scene quickly and safely. They may perform basic clinical tasks under the direct supervision of a paramedic. The College of Paramedics does not expect ECAs to make independent clinical decisions.

This frontline staff role was introduced in 2006 to modernise NHS ambulances and to lower costs. By 2011 there were 2000 people working as ECAs in the United Kingdom.

== Implementation ==
Each regional ambulance service determines its own criteria around what is needed to become an ECA. They are amongst the lowest paid front line staff in the NHS, typically being paid at AfC band 3 or 4.

Ambulance crew unions and a range of healthcare professionals have expressed reservations about having ambulance services employ a large number of ECAs, both before and after the change. Unions representing ambulance workers had fears that the workforce changes could lead to an increase in the risk to patients as well as adding to the workload of paramedics and had written to East Midlands Ambulance Service to ask for the reintroduction of the technician role.

Another issue is the amount of driving an ECA has to do during a 12-hour shift, as driving time regulations do not apply to emergency services. Whilst either of the crew members may drive when responding to an emergency case, the paramedic is more likely to attend a patient during an emergency transport, meaning that the ECA is likely to do more driving.

The Emergency Ambulance Crew (St John Ambulance) qualification is regarded to be equivalent to an Emergency Care Assistant. They can render initial aid and assist with the management of a patient, but cannot make clinical decisions in the context of 999 work. They are permitted more autonomy on events which are not regulated or overseen by the NHS.

In December 2014, after a steep rise in the number of paramedics on long term sick leave suffering stress, Yorkshire Ambulance Service said they would be bringing back the technician role.

== Career development ==
There is a route for some ECAs to progress to Technician level. A training programme is run by the East of England Ambulance NHS Trust (EEAST) which aims to help ECAs progress to technician within 1 year of their basic training; by November 2015, most ECAs working for the East of England Ambulance Service NHS Trust (EEAST) have made the transition from ECA to Technician on this programme.

ECAs who wish to progress to become a paramedic will need to complete a University degree, Some employers do provide structured training to support this, with an expectation that it would take at least two and a half years for an ECA to complete this on a part-time basis.
