= Emergency medical services in South Africa =

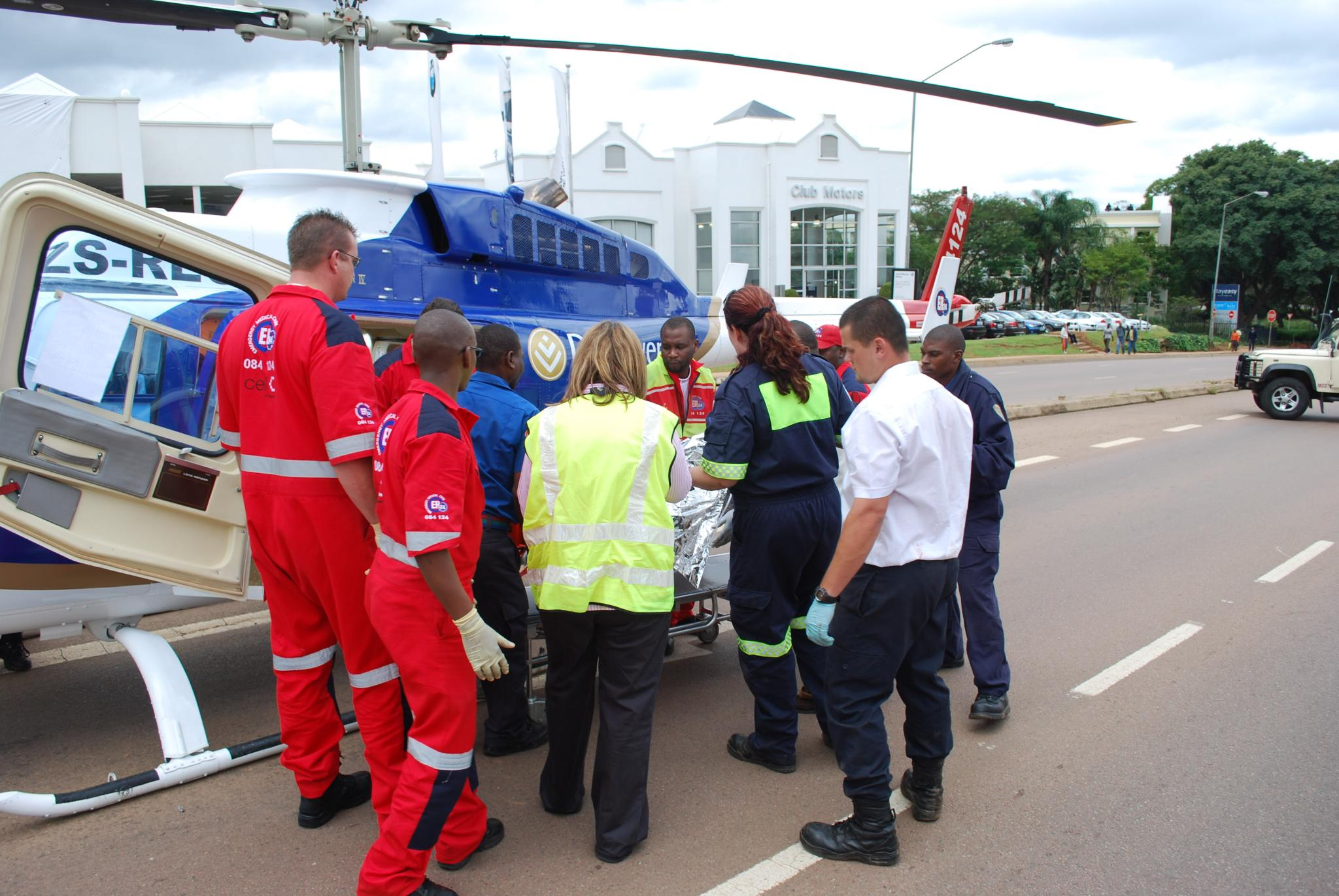
Paramedics loading a patient into an air ambulance after a train crash in Pretoria

Emergency medical services in South Africa are a public/private system aimed at the provision of emergency ambulance service, including emergency care and transportation to hospital.

== Organization ==
=== Land Ambulance ===
Emergency ambulance service is provided by each South African province. The government-operated ambulance system, also known in the Western Cape as METRO (Medical Emergency Transportation and Rescue Operations) provides emergency medical care as well as various rescue options (land, air and sea) to the public. In addition to the paid responders, the government system is supplemented in many areas by volunteers. In cases where volunteers are used, the standards for operation are set by the provincial Health Department, which also provides vehicles, equipment, and operating expenses. Operations are normally administered at the local level through the Emergency Management Service, which oversees police and fire protection as well. The co-location of ambulances with fire apparatus is common in South Africa, although they are two independent services. The national emergency number for ambulances in South Africa is 10 177.

These publicly operated services are supplemented by multiple private-for-profit ambulance companies, NetCare 911 and ER24, of which operate locally and nationally. The statutory services and private companies are further supplemented by voluntary ambulance services, including the South African Red Cross, and St. John Ambulance. All are required to meet the same standards as the public services with respect to staff qualifications. These services are self-dispatching and do not participate in the national emergency number scheme.

=== Air Ambulance ===
Public and Private air ambulance service is provided by the multiple private aircraft charter companies throughout the country.

The system operates both helicopters and fixed wing turboprop aircraft.

These contracts(Tenders) is provided by each Province on a yearly basis to all respective service providers.

=== Rescue ===
Technical Rescue services is for the most part provided by the local Fire Service of each municipality. However, due to the reduction in service, much of this has been taken over by volunteer organizations who work alongside the South African Air Force, since the high altitude dictates the use of military specification helicopters. In conjunction, volunteers and the South African Air Force carry out the technical rescue needs in each province in collaboration with the South African Police Service Search and Rescue Division.

== Standards ==
=== Training ===
In South Africa there are currently 3 different levels of proficiency in Short course training:

- BAA or Basic Ambulance Assistant – This is a Basic Life Support (BLS) certification, and approximately the equivalent of the US EMT. This is the minimum qualification to be a crew member of an ambulance in South Africa. Training includes a 160-hour course consisting of lectures and practical simulations. The lectures cover basic anatomy and physiology, basic life support (including both CPR and first aid), emergency care, the use of ambulance equipment, including Automated External Defibrillators (AED), and various medico-legal issues. This qualification is no longer offered in the country since 2017. Existing Practitioners are allowed to continue their supervised practise.

This qualification has now been changed to:

- ECA or Emergency Care Assistant – a One year Full-Time study at college or University This is currently a Basic Life Support (BLS) certification containing the scope of the Ambulance Emergency Assistant qualification with a few additions. Excluding the ability to Practise Emergency Medicine Independently. This qualification is Registered as Supervised practise and Graduates register under the ECA register with the HPCSA.

- AEA or Ambulance Emergency Assistant – This is an Intermediate Life Support (ILS) certification, and generally close to the same scope of the US AEMT in most skills but the South African counterparts have more training, with some added skills. To apply for this training, candidates must have a minimum of 1,000 hours of practical experience as a qualified Basic Ambulance Assistance and they must pass an entrance exam to be eligible for entry on the course. As an alternative route to certification, those completing the more advanced tertiary qualifications may challenge the examination and be certified as an AEA after successfully completing their first or second year of training. Training at this level consists of a 470-hour course, consisting of 240 hours of lectures and practical simulations, and 230 hours of experiential learning. AEAs are qualified to practice various invasive techniques such as IV therapy, needle Cricothyroidotomy and needle Thoracocentesis, as well as Electrocardiogram interpretation, manual external defibrillation, and are allowed to administer various drugs. This qualification is no longer offered. Existing Practitioners are allowed to continue to practise independently.

- CCA or Critical Care Assistant and the "National Diploma" – These Advanced Life Support (ALS) candidates must complete a 1,200-hour course to qualify as a CCA in addition to their prior Basic Ambulance Assistant and Ambulance Emergency Assistant qualifications. This level usually takes more than four years to complete.

The National Diploma (NDIP) is a three-year NQF 7, full-time study at a college or university. This qualification is no longer offered. Existing practitioners are allowed to continue to practise independently. And is now changed to a Diploma in Emergency Medical Care (DIPEMC) a two-year NQF 6 full-time study at a college or university.

CCA, DIPEMC and NDIP are all registered as a Paramedic - Ambulaans Nood Tegnikus (ANT) with the Health Professions Council South Africa and they can continue to do an additional 2 year Bachelours (B-Tech) now formally changed to Bachelours in Emergency Medical Care (BEMC) a four-year full-time degree.

- ECT or Emergency Care Technician – This mid-level course is of two years duration, and exits on a level just above what many know as Intermediate Life Support (ILS), but similar to Advanced Life Support (ALS), yet without advanced airway management manoeuvres. Students who pass this course are eligible to apply to the HPCSA to be registered in the category of Emergency Care Technician (ECT). This qualification is no longer offered, Existing Practitioners are allowed to continue to practise independently.

ECT and NDIP has been merged into the now known DIPEMC or Paramedic category

- BTech/BEMC or The bachelor's degree Technology or bachelor's degree in Emergency Medical Care – This is a four-year professional degree, and students who complete this degree are eligible to be registered with the HPCSA as Emergency Care Practitioner (ECP), which has an additional scope of practice over the Critical Care Assistant and the National Diploma and Diploma qualifications. The two additions in stand-alone capabilities are Thrombolysis and Rapid sequence induction. ECPs are also trained in the rescue disciplines offered by their institutions, normally up to the level of Advanced Rescue Practitioner. Example: High Angle II, Motor Vehicle, Fire Search and Rescue, Aviation, Confined Space, Structural Collapse, Industrial and Agricultural, Trench, Aquatic Rescue, etc. The advantage of the Btech qualification is that it is a university qualification that is consistent with the international industry trend.

Further opportunities for educational advancement exist for the ECP, as they are able to articulate into various Masters (M.EMC)(Mphil.EM)(MSc.EM) and Doctorate (DEMC)(PhD) programmes.

All EMS personnel in South Africa are required to meet the standards of the governing body, the Health Professions Council of South Africa. A formal register is maintained for each type of EMS certification. All health practitioners in The Republic of South Africa are regulated by the Health Professions Council of South Africa (HPCSA) as set out in the Health Professions ACT. To confirm a practitioner's qualification and Valid license, one can check the i-Register

=== Future training ===
Recently, the Health Professions Council of South Africa (HPCSA), has begun steps to change the system of education in the Emergency Services and they hope to change the EMS training system by 2010. These steps would involve limiting short course ( BAA ) and only having a 2-year nCert (Intermediate level qualification) and B-Tech (ALS level qualification). Given the economics of the system and its current reliance on volunteers in some communities and locales, it remains unclear whether it will be either possible or practical to eliminate the BAA certification for anyone other than paid staff in the near future.

The mid-level course is 2 years in duration, and exits on a level slightly above Ambulance Emergency Assistant (AEA), but below Advanced Life Support (ALS). They are placed on the Emergency Care Technician (ECT) register. The clinician qualification is a four-year professional degree in Emergency Medical Care (Bachelor Emergency Medical Care), and is placed on the Emergency Care Practitioner (ECP) register. The five institutions in the country currently presenting the ECP qualification are the:

- University of Johannesburg
- Central University of Technology
- Durban University of Technology
- Cape Peninsula University of Technology
- Nelson Mandela Metropolitan University

=== Medical oversight ===
Under the old system, all levels of EMS personnel essentially functioned as an extension of their Medical Director's license to practice medicine. Under the new system, Emergency Medical Practitioners are permitted considerable latitude with respect to independent practice. Standing orders or protocols do exist, and consultation with a physician (particularly for all levels of qualifications) is ticean option, but for the most part the AEA, ECP, CCA, ECT, DIP and NDIP functions as a fully independent practitioner, similar to the Paramedic Practitioners in the UK. Protocols are currently as of 2016, being referred to and replaced by: Clinical Practice Guidelines; and will thus phase out the terminology of "protocols"

=== Staffing ===
Currently, ambulances are staffed by the BLS and ILS practitioners, usually working paired together (BAA & AEA). In many volunteer services, however, a crew of two BAAs is not uncommon. The ALS providers normally work on rapid response vehicles to improve response times. ALS is required to be dispatched in support of the ambulance crew to all Priority 1 (Code Red) patients (those with high-acuity conditions or injuries). The national objective is to have one staffed emergency ambulance for every 10,000 population by 2010; however, in some parts of the country this ratio is currently approximately 1 ambulance for every 60,000.

=== Vehicles ===
The vehicles used by EMS in South Africa can vary greatly across a broad range. They may be large or small, new or quite old, often driven by local economics. There is no specific current standard for ambulance design in South Africa. Some vehicles comply with either the European standard CEN 1789 or the US standard, KKK-1822, but many meet neither standard. There are even examples of motorcycles with stretcher-carrying sidecars.

=== Dispatch ===
In the past, EMS dispatch has occurred from a variety of sources, and in many cases, has involved self-dispatch, which the currently operating private companies still do. The evolution of EMS is a national priority, and the government has created a National Emergency Medical Service Strategic Framework, complete with goals and timelines. The current objective calls for centralised dispatch to be available from at least two call centres, located in major centres, in each South African province by 2010. A national emergency telephone number for EMS has been established. This number is 10–177.

=== Response times ===
There are currently no official "response time" standards in the South African system. However, response times of fifteen minutes for high-acuity calls in urban areas are considered acceptable, By Private Emergency Medical Services. As for the State Owned Services response times vary between 1 Hour - 3 Hours for high-acuity calls and in rural areas, response times of 60 minutes by Private Emergency Medical Services for similar calls are not uncommon. For state owned Services never arriving is not uncommon.

== See also ==
- Healthcare in South Africa
