= Joint Royal Colleges Ambulance Liaison Committee =

- Joint Royal Colleges Ambulance Liaison Committee
- JRCALC
- Founded: 1989
- Location: United Kingdom
- Website: www.jrcalc.org.uk

JRCALC is the Joint Royal Colleges Ambulance Liaison Committee. The clinical guideline producer combines expert advice with practical guidance to help paramedics in their challenging roles and supports them in providing patient care. The guidelines cover an extensive range of topics, from resuscitation, medical emergencies, trauma, obstetrics and medicines, to major incidents and staff wellbeing.. The first meeting of JRCALC was in 1989 and was hosted by the Royal College of Physicians, London.

== Operations ==
The guidelines, endorsed by the committee, aim to support ambulance service personnel in the prehospital environment by defining best practice in managing a wide variety of patients. The committee is not without its critics: the College of Paramedics have previously criticised the committee for poor reference to available evidence.

JRCALC have produced a number of systematic reviews on various topics in coordination with the Royal Colleges in the United Kingdom. Available evidence is researched and discussed by a team of academics and clinicians three times per year. The guidelines are officially distributed by publisher Class Professional Publishing, and new editions have been released every three years since 2013
