= Royal College of Paramedics =

UK professional body

- Founded: 2001
- Headquarters: Bridgwater
- Location: United Kingdom
- Members: 20,750 (2025)
- Patron: The Prince of Wales
- Key people: President: Jon Price, Chief Executive: Tracy Nicholls, Chief Operating Officer: Lewis Andrews
- Website: Official website

The Royal College of Paramedics is the recognised professional body for paramedics in the United Kingdom. The role of the College is to promote and develop the profession across England, Scotland, Wales and Northern Ireland.

The college represents the paramedic profession across key organisations such as the Health and Care Professions Council (HCPC), the Department of Health and the Joint Royal Colleges Ambulance Liaison Committee (JRCALC).

== History ==
Paramedicine in the UK began with regional schemes in the 1970s, the AEMT oversaw examinations and registration. A pass rate of 5% due to the wide syllabus and negatively marked high standards prevented the NHS from adopting the scheme, it would have cost too much and taken too long. Individuals had been self funding up to then and using days off as well as leave to undertake hospital training. The NHS introduced a national course in 1988 for 'extended care ambulance staff.' Existing Paramedics sat a conversion examination in November 1986 with the first certificates being awarded alphabetically. Courses began in the following year. The introduction of professional national registration of paramedics in 2000 led to a demand for the formation of a new professional body.

Paramedics were the only professional group in the initial registration to not have clear representation by a central professional body. Two members of staff from the then Essex Ambulance Service, Stephen Dolphin and Richard Lane, established a professional association to represent the paramedic profession and undertake the self-regulation of paramedic standards and education required by the HPC. The name of British Paramedic Association (BPA) was agreed at an inaugural meeting held at AMBEX in 2001. In 2009 the organisation's name was changed to the College of Paramedics. This reflected the association's ambitions to be the professional voice of pre-hospital ambulance clinicians, and also to act as the driving authority for increasing the quality of prehospital clinical care education, training, proficiency and continuous professional development.

In November 2015, the college was awarded registered charity status. As of June 2017, the college had a total membership of 12,700 – around 35% of registered UK Paramedics.

In October 2025, it was announced that the college had been granted permission to use the title "royal". On 1 January 2026, the college’s name officially became the Royal College of Paramedics.

== Objectives ==
- To strengthen and develop the profession and represent the interests of paramedics
- To raise awareness of the paramedic profession's contribution to patient care
- To encourage and share good clinical practice and high standards of care
- To develop and expand the potential of the profession in its contribution to patient care
- To represent the views of the profession, employers and other important and influential external bodies
- To encourage high standards of professional education and development
- To commission, report and analyse research in out-of-hospital patient care

== College governance ==
The board of trustees is appointed to ensure the college serves the interests of its members and the paramedic profession. It is responsible for the governance, oversight of business and the setting of the strategic direction for the profession.

The board is supported by an executive team and staff.

== Notable Individuals ==
On 15 January 2025, it was announced that the Prince of Wales had become patron of the college.

== Membership ==
There are three levels of membership available within the college:

- Full – available to Paramedics (registered with the HCPC).
- Student – available to those who are currently undertaking a Health and Care Professions Council approved course leading to eligibility to apply to the register.
- Associate – available to anyone with an interest in the paramedic and pre-hospital care profession.

== Post-nominals and fellowships ==
The college authorises the use of the following post-nominals by members:

- MCPara – Member of the Royal College of Paramedics
- FCPara – Fellow of the Royal College of Paramedics. The title of Fellow of the Royal College of Paramedics is awarded to Paramedics who have made outstanding contributions to either the development of Paramedic education; improving professional practice; or outstanding contributions towards the objectives of the Royal College of Paramedics.

No update has been provided regarding any change to the post-nominals, following the change of name to the Royal College of Paramedics.

== Publications ==
The college has published policy, including;

- A Curriculum Framework for Ambulance Education (2006) (newer versions have been produced but are not open access or freely available to the public)
- Position statement on intubation (2008)
- Administration of drugs by Paramedics and Student Paramedics (2011)

The college are active participants of a range of groups, including the Joint Royal College Ambulance Liaison Committee and the AACE Clinical Practice Guidelines. The college is also a member of the Royal College of Physicians hosted Intercollegiate Stroke Working Party and Guidelines Development Group, leading the pre-hospital guidelines development sub-group. The college has been the key partner in the development of the Professional Guidance on the Content of Ambulance Clinical Records.

== Representation ==
The college represents the views and interests of the paramedic profession on various groups:

  - Higher Education Ambulance Development Group (HEADG)
  - National Heads of Ambulance Education Group
  - Joint Royal College Ambulance Liaison Committee (JRCALC)
    - JRCALC Clinical Guidelines Group
  - UK Stroke Forum
  - Allied Health Professions Federation (AHPF)
  - Department of Health
  - Ambulance Workforce Forum
  - Connecting for Health (CfH)
  - National Ambulance Education & Development Forum
  - Faculty of Forensic and Legal Medicine
  - Ambulance Infection Control Group
  - Health & Care Professions Council (HCPC)
  - The Trauma Care Council
  - The National Ambulance Research Steering Group
  - The Faculty of Pre-hospital Care Board
  - The 999 EMS Research Forum Board
  - Cardiovascular, Stroke and Vascular Specialist Collections of NHS Evidence (formerly the National Electronic Library for Health)

== See also ==
- British Association for Immediate Care
- BASICS Scotland
- Highland PICT Team
- Emergency medical personnel in the United Kingdom
