= Thoracostomy =

Creation of an opening in the chest cavity for drainage

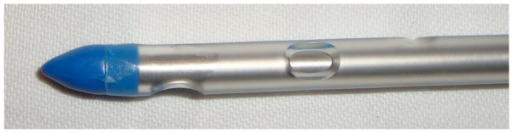
- A tube thoracostomy unit
- Specialty: Pulmonology
- ICD-10-PCS: Z46.82
- MeSH: D006468
- MedlinePlus: 002947
- eMedicine: 80678

A thoracostomy is a small incision of the chest wall, with maintenance of the opening for drainage. It is most commonly used for the treatment of a pneumothorax. This is performed by physicians, paramedics, or other practitioners usually via needle thoracostomy or an incision into the chest wall with the insertion of a thoracostomy tube (chest tube) or with a hemostat and the provider's finger (finger thoracostomy).

== Medical uses ==
When air, blood, or other fluids accumulate in the pleural cavity it may be drained by thoracostomy. Whereas air in this space (pneumothorax) may be released by needle thoracostomy, other substances require drainage with a thoracostomy tube.

== Contra-indications ==
There are no absolute contraindications to thoracostomy. There are relative contraindications (such as coagulopathies); however, in an emergency setting these are outweighed by the necessity to re-inflate a collapsed lung by draining fluid/air from the space around the lung.

== Technique ==
The standard location for thoracostomy is the triangle of safety. This is an anatomical triangle. The borders of which are; the anterior border of the latissimus dorsi, the lateral border of the pectoralis major muscle, a line superior to the horizontal level of the nipple (or 5th intercostal space), with the apex being below, or at, the axilla. A primary skin incision is made superiorly to the rib to avoid the neurovascular supply that runs inferiorly to the rib. This should be around 4–5 cm long. The clinician will tunnel through the subcutaneous tissue and muscle using forceps to reach the pleural. Further blunt dissection is used to carefully penetrate the pleural cavity. A finger is then inserted into this hole, the finger is swept to feel for lung adhesions to the rib cage and to feel for an inflating lung. This cavity is where a hemothorax or pneumothorax would accumulate. A finger thoracostomy as described here can be the first step in inserting an intercostal chest drain. At this point, a chest tube can be inserted and connected to a one way wale to allow continuous drainage. A Roman sandal tie and U-Stitch are done to secure the chest tube and to ensure that removal of the tube will not produce another pneumothorax. Chest x-ray is performed post-procedure to confirm placement and to check for resolution of the pneumothorax/hemothorax.

== Risks and complications ==
Rare complications are mostly due to placement technique, inexperience of the interventionist, and emergent vs. elective circumstances. The most common complications are recurrent pneumothorax (incomplete recovery, but an expected course), infection, and organ injury (due to mechanical damage).

Esophageal injury is rare. If saliva and chyme contents drain from the chest tube, that should raise suspicion of esophageal injury. The main treatment of esophageal injury is surgical repair. The stomach is also rarely injured. Proper technique and not using a trocar during the procedure decreases the risk of this from occurring.
