= Paramedics in the United States =

Star of Life

In the United States, the paramedic is an allied health professional whose primary focus is to provide advanced emergency medical care for patients who access Emergency Medical Services (EMS). This individual possesses the complex knowledge and skills necessary to provide patient care and transportation. Paramedics function as part of a comprehensive EMS response under physician medical direction. Paramedics often serve in a prehospital role, responding to Public safety answering point (9-1-1) calls in an ambulance. The paramedic serves as the initial entry point into the health care system. A standard requirement for state licensure involves successful completion of a nationally accredited Paramedic program at the certificate or associate degree level, though states like New York rely on their own state-administered testing and certifications for paramedic licensure rather than requiring completion of nationally accredited programs.

== History ==
The earliest ambulances were usually accompanied by a physician on emergency call. However, by the 1960s, ambulance services, while becoming ubiquitous, were poorly supported and staffed and unevenly trained. 50% of the ambulance services were provided by morticians, primarily because their hearses were able to accommodate patients on litters. In the best cases, ambulances were staffed with advanced first-aid level responders who were frequently referred to as "ambulance attendants," but there was little regulation or standardized training for those staffing these early emergency response vehicles or the required equipment carried inside, and active care during transportation was not possible in the vehicles of the time.

In September 1966 the National Academy of Sciences published a report titled "Accidental Death and Disability: The Neglected Disease of Modern Society". The report noted that soldiers who were seriously wounded on the battlefields of Vietnam had a better survival rate than those individuals who were seriously injured in motor vehicle accidents on California freeways. Early research attributed these differences in outcome to a number of factors, including comprehensive trauma care, rapid transport to designated trauma facilities, and a new type of medical corpsman; one who was trained to perform certain critical advanced medical procedures such as fluid replacement and airway management, which allowed the victim to survive the journey to definitive care.

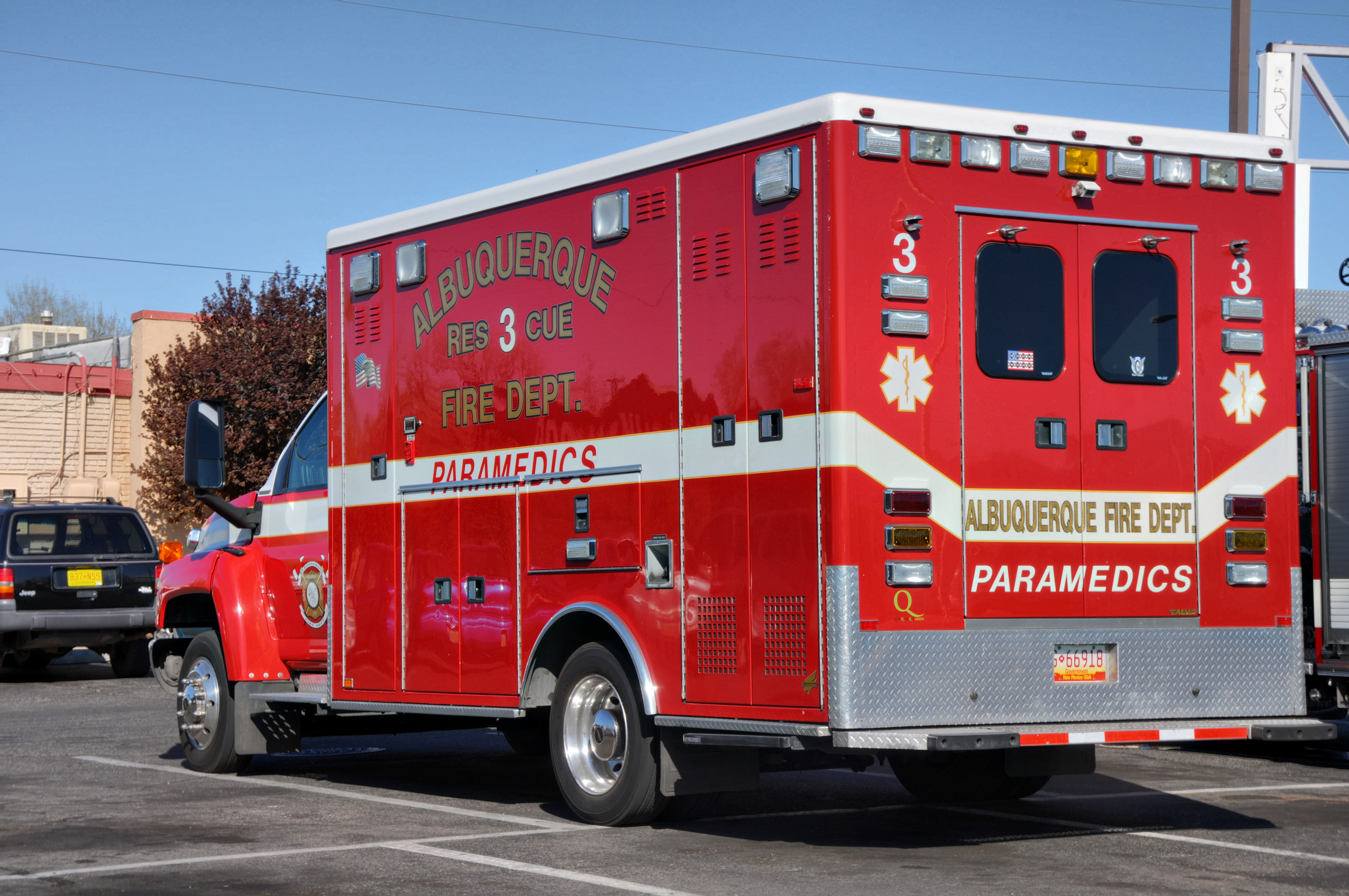
Paramedics traveling to a patient in an ambulance

=== Initial pilot projects ===
Several communities began experimenting with more advanced emergency medical care in the late 1960s and early 1970s:

- Pittsburgh's branch of Freedom House paramedics are credited as the first emergency medical technician (EMT) trainees in the United States. Pittsburgh's Peter Safar is referred to as the father of CPR. In 1967, he began training unemployed African-American men in what later became Freedom House Ambulance Service, the first paramedic squadron in the United States.
- Dr. Eugene Nagel trained city of Miami firefighters as the first U.S. paramedics to use invasive techniques and portable defibrillators with telemetry in 1967.
- In 1969, Los Angeles cardiologist Walter S. Graf created a "mobile critical care unit" to provide skilled medical care to coronary patients during emergency transportation to a hospital. The unit, a Chevrolet van equipped with a portable defibrillator, was staffed by a registered nurse. The same year his patient Kenneth Hahn, a member of the Los Angeles County Board of Supervisors, persuaded the Supervisors to approve a pilot program to train county firefighters as "Mobile Intensive Care Paramedics". A change in state law was necessary to allow personnel other than doctors and nurses to render emergency medical care. Hahn recruited two state legislators who wrote the Wedworth-Townsend Paramedic Act of 1970, signed into law by Governor Ronald Reagan on July 15, 1970, despite opposition from doctors, nurses, and attorneys. Paramedic training began the next month at the Freeman Memorial Hospital under Graf's direction. It was the first nationally accredited paramedic training program in the United States.
- Portland's Leonard Rose, M.D., in cooperation with Buck Ambulance Service, instituted a cardiac training program and began training ambulance personnel in ECG interpretation, CPR, and defibrillation in 1969.
- Baltimore's R Adams Cowley, who had founded the first trauma center in the US in 1958, devised the concept of integrated emergency care, negotiating to have first military helicopters and later state police helicopters brought to his Center for the Study of Trauma in 1969. Later, in 1973, Cowley would lead the first state-wide Division of Emergency Medical Services.
- In Seattle, the Medic One program at Harborview Medical Center and the University of Washington Medical Center, started by Leonard Cobb, M.D., began training firefighters in CPR in 1970.
- In 1972 the first standing civilian emergency medical helicopter transport service, Flight for Life opened in Denver, Colorado. Emergency medical helicopters were soon put into service elsewhere in the United States.

=== Popularization in culture ===
A television producer, working for producer Jack Webb, of Dragnet and Adam-12 fame, was in Los Angeles' UCLA Harbor Medical Center, doing background research for a proposed new TV show about doctors, when he happened to encounter these 'firemen who spoke like doctors and worked with them'. This novel idea would eventually evolve into the Emergency! television series, which ran from 1972 to 1977, portraying the exploits of a new group called 'paramedics'. The show captured the imagination of emergency services personnel, the medical community, and the general public. When the show first aired in 1972, there were only 6 full-fledged paramedic units operating in 3 pilot programs (Miami, Los Angeles, Seattle) in the whole of the United States. No one had ever heard the term 'paramedic'; indeed, it is reported that one of the show's actors was initially concerned that the 'para' part of the term might involve jumping out of airplanes. By the time the program ended production in 1977, there were paramedics operating in every state. The show's technical advisor was a pioneer of paramedicine, James O. Page, then a Battalion Chief responsible for the Los Angeles County Fire Department 'paramedic' program, but who would go on to help establish other paramedic programs in the U.S., and to become the founding publisher of the Journal of Emergency Medical Services.

=== Evolution and maturity ===
Throughout the 1970s and 1980s, the field continued to evolve, although in large measure, on a local level. The term 'ambulance service' was replaced by 'emergency medical service' to reflect the change from a transportation system to a system that provides actual medical care. The training, knowledge base, and skill sets of both paramedics and emergency medical technicians (both competed for the job title, and 'EMT-Paramedic' was a common compromise) were typically determined by what local medical directors were comfortable with, what it was felt that the community needed, and what could actually be afforded. There were also tremendous local differences in the amount and type of training required, and how it would be provided. This ranged from in-service training in local systems, through community colleges, and ultimately even to universities. Dr. Jonathan Wasserberger helped create a teaching curriculum for emergency medical care in 1973.

During the evolution of paramedicine, a great deal of both curriculum and skill set was in a state of constant flux. Permissible skills evolved in many cases at the local level, and were based upon the preferences of physician advisers and medical directors. Treatments would go in and out of fashion, and sometimes, back in again. The use of certain drugs, Bretylium for example, illustrate this. In some respects, the development seemed almost faddish. Technologies also evolved and changed, and as medical equipment manufacturers quickly learned, the pre-hospital environment was not the same as the hospital environment; equipment standards that worked fine in hospitals could not cope well with the less controlled pre-hospital environment.

Physicians began to take more interest in paramedics from a research perspective as well. By about 1990, most of the 'trendiness' in pre-hospital emergency care had begun to disappear, and was replaced by outcome-based research and evidence-based medicine; the gold standard for the rest of medicine. This research began to drive the evolution of the practice of both paramedics and the emergency physicians who oversaw their work; changes to procedures and protocols began to occur only after significant outcome-based research demonstrated their need. Paramedics became increasingly accountable for their errors as well, and these too led to changes in procedure. Such changes affected everything from simple procedures, such as CPR, to changes in drug protocols and other advanced procedures. As the profession of paramedic grew, some of its members actually went on to become not just research participants, but researchers in their own right, with their own projects and journal publications.

== Education ==
The education and skills required of paramedics vary by state. The U.S. National Highway Traffic Safety Administration (NHTSA) designs and specifies a National Standard Curriculum for EMT training. Most paramedic education and certifying programs require that a student is at a minimum educated and trained to the National Standard Curriculum for a particular skill level. The National Registry of Emergency Medical Technicians (NREMT) is a private, central certifying entity whose primary purpose is to maintain a national standard. NREMT also provides certification information for paramedics who relocate to another state.

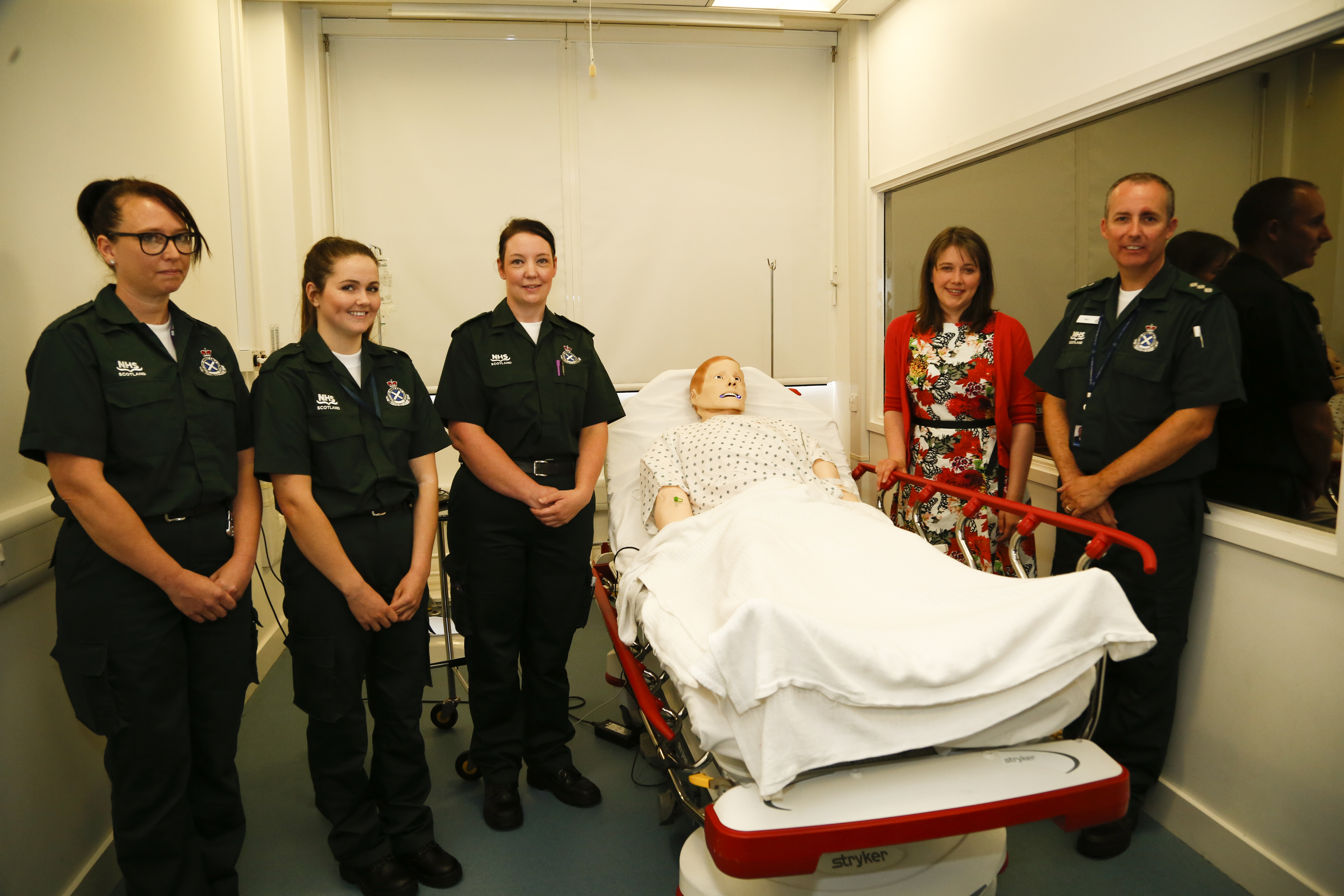
Paramedics in training

Paramedic education programs can be as short as six months or as long as four years. An associate degree program is two years, often administered through a community college. Degree programs are an option, with two-year associate degree programs being most common, although four-year bachelor's degree programs exist. In contrast to Commonwealth countries such as Canada, the United Kingdom, Australia and New Zealand, generally the minimum education is a two- to three-year degree at an accredited college or university for the entry-level paramedic, with four-year or even graduate degrees becoming the preferred credential in such jurisdictions. Many paramedic programs in the United States are through adult career and technical schools that provide a certificate of completion upon completion of the program. All programs must meet the current national standard curriculum. The institutions offering such training vary greatly across the country in terms of programs and requirements, and each must be examined by the prospective student in terms of both content and requirements where they hope to practice.

Regardless of education, all students must meet the same state requirements to take the certification exams. Most states also require passing the National Registry exam, which use Computer Based Testing (CBT).

Most locales and the national registry require that paramedics attend ongoing refresher courses and continuing medical education to maintain their license or certification.

In addition to state and national registry certifications, most paramedics are required to be certified in pediatric advanced life support, pediatric prehospital care or pediatric emergencies for the prehospital provider, prehospital trauma life support; international trauma life support, and advanced cardiac life support. These additional requirements have education and certification from organizations such as the American Heart Association.

== Credentialling and oversight ==
In the U.S., the community college training model remains the most common, although some university-based paramedic education models exist. These variations in both educational approaches and standards has led to tremendous differences from one location to another. There may be situations in which a group of people with 120 hours of training, and another group (in another jurisdiction) with university degrees, were both calling themselves 'paramedics'. There were some efforts made to resolve these discrepancies. The National Association of Emergency Medical Technicians (NAEMT) along with National Registry of Emergency Medical Technicians (NREMT) attempted to create a national standard by means of a common licensing examination, but to this day, this has never been universally accepted by U.S. States, and issues of licensing reciprocity for paramedics continue, although if an EMT obtains certification through NREMT (NREMT-P, NREMT-I, NREMT-B), this is accepted by 40 of the 50 states in the United States. This confusion was further complicated by the introduction of complex systems of gradation of certification, reflecting levels of training and skill, but these too were, for the most part, purely local. To clarify, at least at a national level, the National Highway Traffic Safety Administration (NHTSA), which is the federal organization with authority to administer the EMS system, defines the various titles given to prehospital medical workers based on the level of care they provide. They are EMT-P (Paramedic), EMT-I (Intermediate), EMT-B (Basic), and First Responders. While providers at all levels are considered emergency medical technicians, the term "paramedic" is most properly used in the United States to refer only to those providers who are EMT-P's. Apart from this distinction, the only truly common trend that would evolve was the relatively universal acceptance of the term 'emergency medical technician' being used to denote a lower level of training and skill than a 'paramedic'.

Changes in procedures also included the manner in which the work of paramedics was overseen and managed. In the earliest days of the field, medical control and oversight was direct and immediate, with paramedics calling into a local hospital and receiving orders for every individual procedure or drug. This still occurs in some jurisdictions, but is becoming very rare. As physicians began to build a bond of trust with paramedics, and experience in working with them, their confidence levels also rose. Increasingly, in many jurisdictions day-to-day operations moved from direct and immediate medical control to pre-written protocols or 'standing orders', with the paramedic typically only calling in for direction after the options in the standing orders had been exhausted. Medical oversight became driven more by chart review or rounds, than by step by step control during each call.

== Scope of practice ==
In the United States there are no federal rules or regulations for the scope of practice for any level of EMS provider, though there is a noncompulsive scope of practice model. In the field, paramedics follow a set of pre-approved procedures and interventions for particular scenarios, which may be known as protocols or guidelines. These protocols or guidelines are usually specific to a region or individual medical service, though some states have statewide protocols. For example, all fifty states allow for the administration of some form of anti-convulsive. In the state of Massachusetts a paramedic may administer the anti-convulsant, midazolam, up to a maximum of 6 mg, while in Maine paramedics are allowed to administer midazolam in upwards of 10 mg boluses. These pre-approved procedures are known as standing orders. Standing orders cannot surpass a provider's scope of practice. Scopes of practice represent the degree to which providers are trained. As well as standing orders, there are also verbal orders, which require the paramedic contact an emergency physician by radio, cell phone, or telemedicine to receive permission to administer the medication or perform the procedure. Typically, the physician in question will be either at the hospital which will likely receive the patient, or a specific hospital which the service contacts. This is known as on-line medical direction or on-line medical control.

The following is derived NHTSA's "National EMS Scope of Practice model". Without federal mandate, each state's office of emergency medical services may alter their respective standing orders. The purpose of the model is to provide a guide toward standardization in patient care that both improves patient outcomes but allows for reciprocity between states. Prior to certification as a paramedic, candidates must be a certified EMT. Traditionally, a paramedic is allowed to perform all skills an EMT may perform.

Below are some of the key skills and procedures expected of a paramedic in the United States.

=== Key skills and procedures ===
- Assessment and evaluation of general incident scene safety.
- Triage of patients in a mass casualty incident.
- Patient primary and secondary assessments.
- Effective verbal and written reporting skills (documentation).
- Carrying/Lifting/Extrication of patients.
- Peripheral intravenous cannulation.
- Cardiac monitoring and manual defibrillation.
- ECG acquisition and interpretation.
- Orotracheal intubation.

=== Medications ===
One of the primary differences between emergency medical technicians and paramedics includes the breadth and number of medications paramedic ambulances typically carry. Due to the variation between each state EMS office it would be cumbersome and unrealistic to list each and every single medication paramedics carry across the United States. Instead, different medications are carried to serve similar patient-care scenarios. Most services carry medications like albuterol or ipratropium to alleviate bronchospasm during an acute asthma attack. They carry cardiac medications to reverse deadly heart rhythms like amiodarone and lidocaine. They can also use medications like atropine, adenosine and different types of beta-blockers as heart rate controls. Paramedics may also utilize a number of other medications for analgesia, such as antiemetics and anti-convulsants. In the setting of inter-facility transfers providers may continue the administration of other medications that are not typically carried in the field (Heparin, Blood products, Potassium).

=== Variations in scope ===
The aforementioned skills and medications are often standing orders in state protocols. The expectations and responsibilities of providers varies across state lines. There are instances where special waivers granted by states allowing paramedic services to go beyond their protocols. For example, some paramedics in New Hampshire may be allowed to perform a surgical cricothyrotomy, medics in Virginia are allowed to use ultrasound as a diagnostic technique and paramedics in Arizona are allowed to perform rapid-sequence intubation utilizing paralyzing and sedating medications to completely control a patient's airway. These techniques are not unique to these states, however, and are provided only as examples.

== Employment ==
Paramedics are employed by various public and private emergency service providers. These include private ambulance services, fire departments, public safety or police departments, hospitals, law enforcement agencies, the military, and municipal EMS agencies in addition to and independent from police or fire departments, also known as a 'third service'. Paramedics may respond to medical incidents in an ambulance, rescue vehicle, helicopter, fixed-wing aircraft, motorcycle, bicycles, or fire suppression apparatus.

Paramedics may also be employed in medical fields that do not involve transportation of patients. Such positions include offshore drilling platforms, phlebotomy, blood banks, research labs, educational fields, law enforcement and hospitals.

Aside from their traditional roles, paramedics may also participate in one of many specialty arenas:

- Critical care transporters move patients by ground ambulance or aircraft between medical treatment facilities. This may be done to allow a patient to receive a higher level of care in a more specialized facility. Registered Nurses with training in Emergency Nursing may work with paramedics in these settings. Paramedics participating in this role generally also provide care not traditionally administered by Paramedics who respond to 911 calls. Examples of this are blood transfusions, intra-aortic balloon pumps, and mechanical ventilators.
- Tactical paramedics work on law enforcement teams (SWAT). These medics, usually from the EMS agency in the area, are commissioned and trained to be tactical operators in law enforcement, in addition to paramedic duties. Advanced medical personnel perform dual roles as operator and medic on the teams. Such an officer is immediately available to deliver advanced emergency care to other injured officers, suspects, innocent victims and bystanders. The advantage to having dual role paramedics is that medical care is provided almost immediately.
- Hospital paramedics are sometimes employed in either of the outpatient and inpatient areas. Emergency departments employ the largest number of paramedics working inside of hospitals. Considered ambulatory care, emergency departments are classified as an outpatient area of a hospital. Depending on their scope of practice and job description within the emergency department, paramedics are allowed to triage and assess incoming patients, provide analysis and interpretation of both labs and EKGs, intravenous therapy, drug administration, transportation of emergency department patients to diagnostic testing or their inpatient rooms. Paramedics are also employed indirectly in the inpatient areas of hospitals as well. Paramedics are utilized in intensive care units assisting other licensed staff with ICU patients and they are utilized on high risk transport teams by providing transportation, continuation of care and assisting in sedation of patients during minimally invasive and invasive procedures at the bedside and in diagnostic areas. Because of the nature and purpose of these teams, paramedics work closely with radiology, interventional radiology, nuclear medicine and anesthesiology.

In addition, there are other newer paramedic specialties. One is Community Paramedic, who care for patients at home or in other non-urgent settings to provide access to basic healthcare services which may be difficult for patients to access. Another is Wilderness Paramedic, who receives special training to address the unique challenges of providing emergency medical care in remote and austere environments.

== Salary ==
The salary of a paramedic in the US varies. The average is $63,000, with the top 10% earning over $117,000, considerably less than the salaries of paramedics in Canada. Factors such as education and location of the paramedic's practice influence the salary. Paramedic supervisors and managers may make between $60,000- $140,000, depending on location.

== See also ==
- Flight Paramedic
- Emergency medical responder levels by state
- United States Air Force Pararescue
- Emergency medical services in the United States
