= Emergency medical services in the United States =

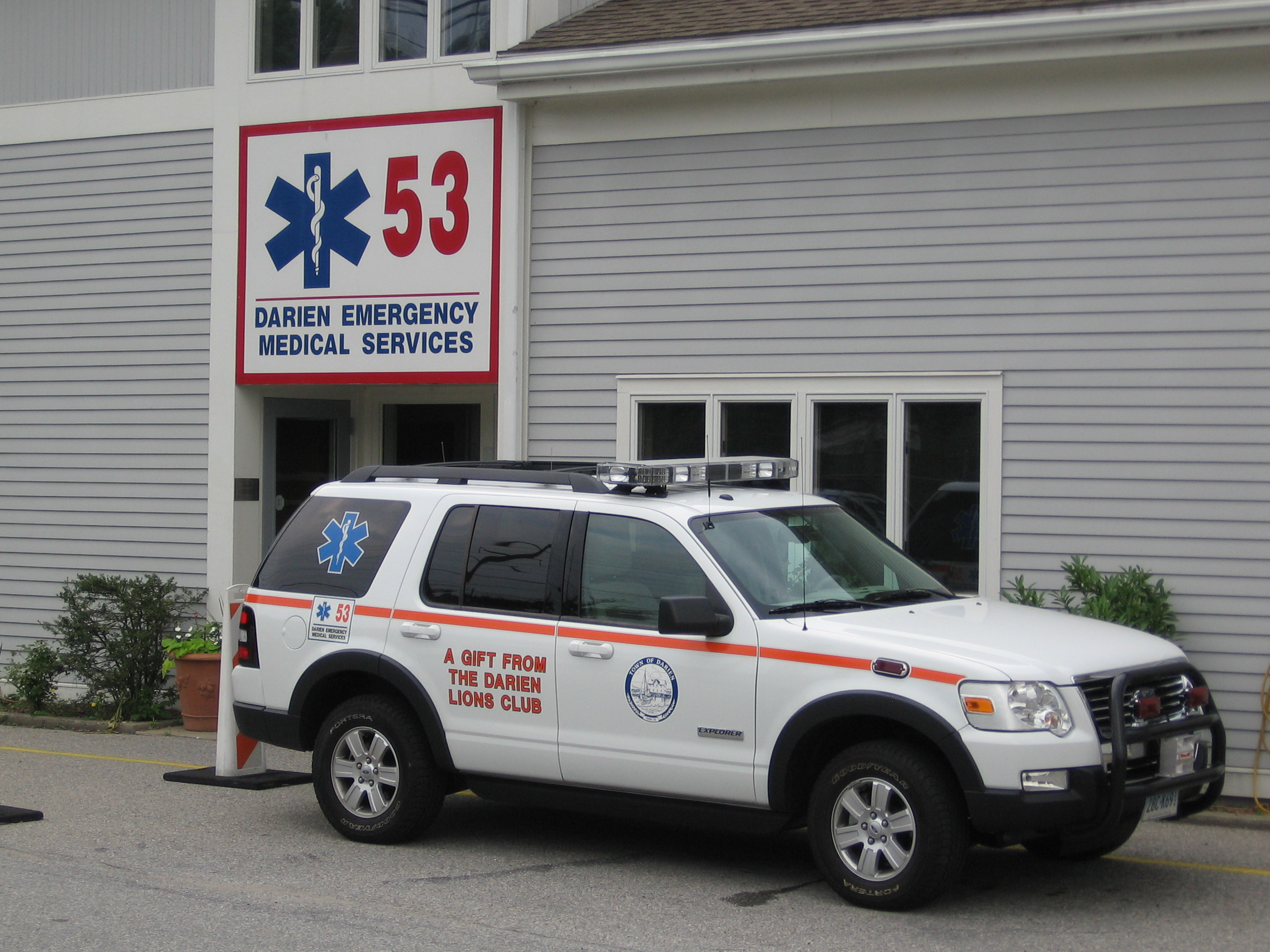
This medical services headquarters in Darien, Connecticut has an emergency vehicle outside ready to respond immediately in case of need.

In the United States, emergency medical services (EMS) provide out-of-hospital acute medical care and/or transport to definitive care for those in need. They are regulated at the most basic level by the National Highway Traffic Safety Administration (NHTSA), which sets the minimum standards that all states' EMS providers must meet, and regulated more strictly by individual state and tribal governments, which often require higher standards from the services they oversee. In some states, county and municipal governments also regulate services in their jurisdictions.

People in the US most frequently request EMS for emergencies by contacting 911, North America's emergency telephone number. In 2018, EMS responded to over 28 million 911 requests, constituting more than half of all EMS calls for service. Including other services such as event standbys, air medical transport, and community paramedicine, EMS responded to over 42 million service requests.

Wide differences in population density, topography, climate and other conditions can call for different types of EMS systems; consequently, there is often significant variation between the Emergency Medical Services provided in one state and those provided in another.

== Organization and funding ==
=== Funding models ===
While most services are, to some degree, publicly funded, the factor which often differentiates services is the manner in which they are operated. EMS systems may be directly operated by the community, or they may fall to a third-party provider, such as a private company.

A 2018 report by Haverford College found that most EMS agencies (41%) are overseen by fire departments, followed by private companies (25%), non-fire government services (21%), and then by hospitals (6%). Other types of ownership accounted for 6% of agencies.

==== Publicly operated EMS ====
In one of the more common publicly operated models, an EMS system is operated directly by the municipality it services. The services themselves may be provided by a local government, or may be the responsibility of the regional (or state) government. Municipality-operated services may be funded by service fees and supplemented by property taxes. In many such cases, the EMS system is considered to be too small to operate independently, and is organized as a branch of another municipal department, such as the Public Health department. In small communities that lack a large population or tax-base, such a service may not be able to operate unless it is staffed by community volunteers. In these cases, the volunteer squad may receive some funding from municipal taxes, but is generally heavily reliant on voluntary donations to cover operating expenses. This provides a significant challenge for volunteer groups, since the training standards for staff must be met, and the vehicle and equipment standards adhered to, while the group does all or most of its own fundraising. Without the presence of dedicated volunteers, however, many small communities in America might be without local EMS systems and would either have no service at all or be forced to rely on service from more distant communities.

Another operating model for publicly operated EMS is what is generally referred to in the industry as the "third service" option. In this option, rather than being an integral part of (or in some cases, an "add-on" to) one of the traditional "emergency" services (fire and police), the service is organized as a separate, free-standing, municipal department, with organization that may be similar to, but operated independently from, either the fire or police departments. In a variant of this model, the EMS system may be recognized as a legitimate third emergency service, but provided under a contractual agreement with another organization, such as a private company or a hospital, instead of direct operation. This model is sometimes referred to as the "public utility" model. This may be a cost-saving measure, or it may be because the community feels that they lack the resident expertise to deal with medical oversight and control issues, and the legal requirements that typically surround an Emergency Medical Service.

In yet another model for publicly operated EMS, the system may be integrated into the operations of another municipal emergency service, such as the local fire department or police department. This integration may be partial or complete. In the case of partial integration, the EMS staff may share quarters, administrative services, and even command and control with the other service. In the case of full integration, the EMS staff may be fully cross-trained to perform the entry-level function of the other emergency service, whether firefighting or policing. Many communities perceive this as providing "added value" to the community, since municipal workers are fulfilling more than one function, and are less likely to be idle.

==== Private/for profit EMS ====
Ambulance services operating on a private/for profit basis have a long history in the U.S. Often, particularly in smaller communities, ambulance service was seen by the community as a lower priority than police or fire services, and not an agency using public funding. Until the professionalization of emergency medical services in the early 1970s, one of the most common providers of ambulance service in the United States was a community's local funeral home. This occurred essentially by default, as hearses were the only vehicles at the time capable of transporting a person lying down. Funeral home ambulance operations were sometimes supplemented by "mom and pop" operations, which were not affiliated with funeral homes but rather operated on much the same basis as a taxi service. There were no national standards for ambulance services and staff generally had little, if any, medical training or equipment, leading to a high pre-hospital mortality rate. Such companies continue to operate this way in some locations, providing non-emergency transport services, fee-for-service emergency service, or contracted emergency ambulance service to municipalities, as in the public utility model. During the late 1970s and early 1980s, more than 200 private ambulance companies in the U.S. were gradually merged into large regional companies, some of which continue to operate today. As this trend continued, the result was a few remaining private companies, a handful of regional companies, and two very large multinational companies which currently dominate the entire industry. These services continue to operate in some parts of the U.S., either on a fee-for-service basis to the patient, or by means of contracts with local municipalities. Such contracts usually result in a fee-for-service operation which is funded by the municipality on a supplementary basis, in exchange for formal guarantees of adequate performance on such issues as staffing, skill sets, resources available, and response times.

==== Model of care ====
The Emergency Medical Service system in the United States typically follows the Anglo-American service delivery model (bringing the patient to the hospital), as opposed to the Franco-German model (bringing the hospital to the patient). Apart from a handful of doctors who work on Medevac aircraft or perform training or medical quality assurance, it is extremely uncommon to see a physician deliberately responding to the scene of an emergency.

==== Air ambulance ====
Air ambulance services in the United States can be operated by a variety of sources. Some services are hospital-operated, while others may be operated by Federal, State or local government; or through a variety of departments, including local or State police, the United States National Park Service, or fire departments. Such services may be operated directly by any of these EMS systems, or they may be contracted to a third-party provider, such as an aircraft charter company. In addition, it is not uncommon for U.S. military helicopters to be pressed into service providing air ambulance support. The vast distances covered by the U.S. mean that while helicopters may be the preferred form of service delivery for "on-scene" emergencies, fixed wing aircraft, including small jets, are often used for transfers from rural hospitals to tertiary care sites. These aircraft are typically staffed by a mix of personnel including physicians, nurses, and paramedics, and in some cases, by all three. Publicly operated air ambulance service is supplemented by emergency and non-emergency air transport service, which may be provided by dedicated air ambulance companies, or by aircraft charter companies as a secondary business operation. 3

Air Ambulance in the United States

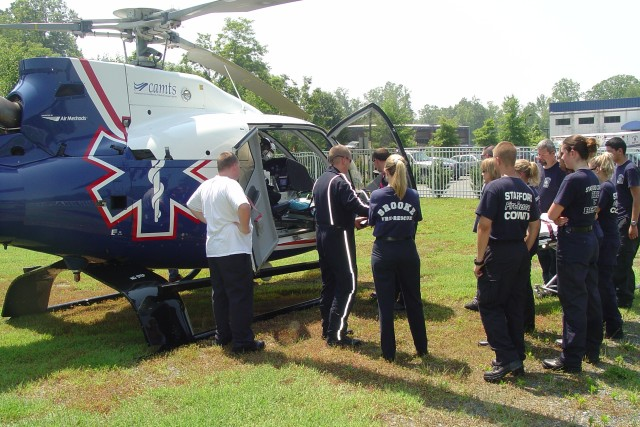
Training with LifeEvac II

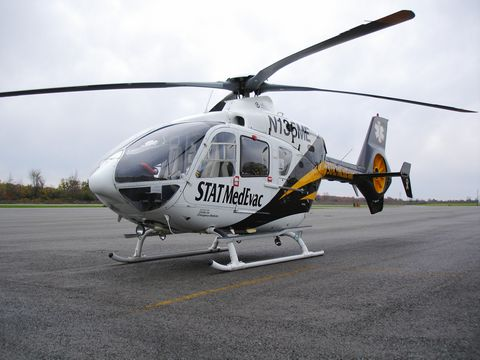
STAT MedEvac

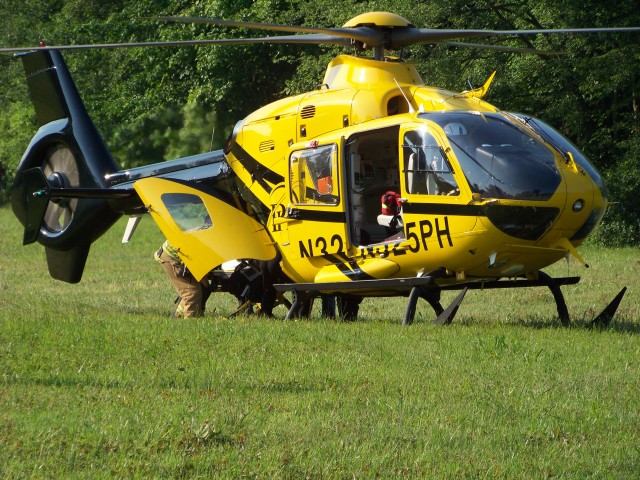
PHI AirMedical AirCare 2

== History ==
=== Pre-modern ===
Grady ambulance service in the United States began in Atlanta, Georgia in 1869. Grady Memorial Hospital staff rode in horse-drawn carriages designed specifically for transporting the sick and injured.

The first volunteer rescue squads organized around 1920 in Roanoke, Virginia, Palmyra, New Jersey, and along the New Jersey coast. Gradually, especially during and after World War II, hospitals and physicians faded from prehospital practice, yielding in urban areas to centrally coordinated programs. These were often controlled by the municipal hospital or fire department. Sporadically, funeral home hearses, which had been the common mode of transport, were being replaced by fire department, rescue squad, and private ambulances.

Prior to the 1970s, ambulance service was largely unregulated. While some areas ambulances were staffed by advanced first-aid-level responders, in other areas, it was common for the local undertaker, having the only vehicles in town in which a person could lie down, to operate both the local furniture store (where he would make coffins as a sideline) and the local ambulance service.

=== Development of modern practices ===
The 1966 release of the National Academy of Sciences' study, "Accidental Death and Disability: The Neglected Disease of Modern Society", (known in the EMS trade as the White Paper) prompted a concerted effort was undertaken to improve emergency medical care in the pre-hospital setting. The study found many unnecessary deaths could be prevented through a combination of community education, stricter safety standards, and better pre-hospital treatments.

Austrian-born Peter Safar, a University of Pittsburgh anesthesiologist was a CPR pioneer who helped create the modern hospital Intensive Care Unit (ICU). His daughter died in 1966 from an asthma attack during transport from her home to the hospital. In response, he designed an ambulance with the necessary medical equipment and a paint scheme. He also designed the first comprehensive regimen for training paramedics. Safar's Freedom House Ambulance Service was the first emergency medical service in the United States to be staffed by paramedics with medical training beyond basic first aid. Freedom House medical director Nancy Caroline authored an EMS training textbook that was accepted as the national standard.

In the late 1960s, Dr. R Adams Cowley was instrumental in the creation of the country's first statewide EMS program, in Maryland. The system was called the Division of Emergency Medical Services (now known as the Maryland Institute for Emergency Medical Services and Systems). Also in 1969, Cowley obtained a military helicopter to assist in rapidly transporting patients to the Center for the Study of Trauma (now known as the R Adams Cowley Shock Trauma Center), a specialized hospital that he had started for the purpose of treating shock. This service was not only the first statewide EMS program, but also the beginning of modern emergency medical helicopter transport in the United States.

The first civilian hospital-based medical helicopter program in the U.S., Flight For Life Colorado, began in 1972 with a single Alouette III helicopter, based at St. Anthony Central Hospital in Denver, Colorado.

National EMS standards for the US are determined by the U.S. Department of Transportation and modified by each state's Department of EMS (usually under its Department of Health), and further altered by Regional Medical Advisory Committees (usually in rural areas) or by other committees, or even individual EMS providers. In addition, the National Registry of Emergency Medical Technicians an independent body, was created in 1970 at the recommendation of President Lyndon B. Johnson in an effort to provide a nationally accepted certification for providers and a nationwide consensus on protocols. Currently, National Registry certification is accepted in some parts of the U.S., while other areas still maintain their own, separate protocols and training curricula.

In particular, in the US state of California, in Seattle, Washington state (Medic One), and in Miami, projects began to include paramedics in the EMS responses in the early 1970s. Groups in Pittsburgh, Pennsylvania, Charlottesville, Virginia and Portland, Oregon were also early pioneers in pre-hospital emergency medical training. Despite opposition from firefighters and doctors, the program eventually gained acceptance as its effectiveness became obvious.

Furthermore, such programs became widely popularized around North America in the 1970s with the NBC television series, Emergency! which, in part, followed the adventures of two Los Angeles County Fire Department paramedics as they responded to various types of medical emergency. James O. Page served as the series technical adviser and went on to become integral in the development of EMS in the U.S. The popularity of this series encouraged other communities to establish their own equivalent services.

=== Shortages ===
In the 21st century, rural communities with declining populations have had more problems finding EMS volunteers, as the local population skews older and has more health problems. From 2005 to mid-2019, 160 rural hospitals closed, many in states that did not expand Medicare as part of the Affordable Care Act, leading to longer drive times for EMS.

The COVID-19 pandemic in the United States caused a major increase in job danger, job stress, and employee turnover, causing a national shortage of EMS workers. Compounding the problem was a temporary shutdown of training, recruitment by hospitals for nursing staff, and increased pay in other occupations experiencing a labor shortage and not subject to government reimbursement limits.

== Occupational health hazards ==
=== Common risks ===
Emergency Medical Service workers face numerous occupational hazards due to frequent activity and setting changes throughout their work day. These risks are usually very similar to health professionals. EMS typically arrives before the environment has been cleared of chemical, biological, and physical hazards. This puts workers at more risk than if they were in a more controlled environment such as a hospital. The most common injuries for EMS workers are sprains and strains. Providers lift several of heavy objects, including people and equipment. High-stress situations can result in injury from violence towards EMS workers. In an examination of occupational hazards to EMS workers, almost two-thirds of EMS workers had experienced some type of violence on the job in 12 months. Most of these incidents involved cursing, punching, and spitting. While all of these are physical health risks, spitting can also be a biological hazard, spreading communicable diseases. Contact with patient blood can also be a serious and common biological hazard for emergency medical staff. Blood can carry pathogens that spread diseases like HIV/AIDS and Hepatitis. These hazards can range from toxic substances from spills or broken glass and sharp metals from explosions or vehicle crashes. Workers use disinfectants like bleach or alcohol-based products when they are cleaning and using proper safety protocols, which can have negative health impacts.

=== Consequences ===
Due to the exposure to pathogens in EMS, providers are at risk for disease. Some of which are Hepatitis C and B, HIV, Smallpox, and Influenza. Not only are they at risk of illness, but physical injuries, whether it be from altercations with patients or from heavy lifting, can result in necessary time off from work. This puts workers at risk of financial crisis or being fired. The stressors that emergency medical staff face, like watching human suffering/death and the job's unpredictable nature, can cause long-term consequences for their mental health as well. Stress on the job can lead to numerous psychological disorders, heart issues, and weakened immune systems. Stress can also develop into PTSD, which can contribute to high suicide rates. The COVID-19 Pandemic exacerbated these mental health issues in EMS workers due to increased field stress and limited resources.

=== Mitigation strategies ===
Fortunately, there are a lot of proven ways to help mitigate EMS worker injury and occupational hazard exposures. Hazard mitigation for EMS in the USA is primarily regulated by the United States Department of Labor. OSHA regulations are commonly grounded in research that is generated or endorsed by NIOSH, an agency that is part of the CDC. Twenty-one US states have state-specific guidelines that are more specific and comprehensive than the federal requirements and are therefore endorsed by OSHA.

A division of the Federal Emergency Management Agency (FEMA), The US Fire Administration, has published guidelines targeted toward reducing occupational hazards in EMS.

The NHTSA, a facet of the federal DOT, has also published the results of many EMS-specific studies, Infographics, and guidelines through their Office of EMS.

Advisory bodies agree on mitigation strategies.

- Providing workers with clear roles and responsibilities can reduce the likelihood of workers partaking in behavior that presents high levels of risk.
- Safe lifting form, use of technology/ergonomic equipment, and additional personnel can minimize sprains and strains from lifting.
- PPE, specialized hazmat units, and decontamination practices can minimize hazardous exposures.
- De-escalation strategies, patient restraints, and allowing law enforcement to secure scenes of violence can minimize the risk of physical violence toward EMS.
- Having a healthy lifestyle, a social support system, and seeking peer support can minimize the traumatic stress from emergencies.
- Thorough training, reduction of unnecessary lights and sirens usage, and increased usage of personal restraints can minimize the risk of injury from vehicle collisions or crashes.

== Standards ==
=== Training and certification ===
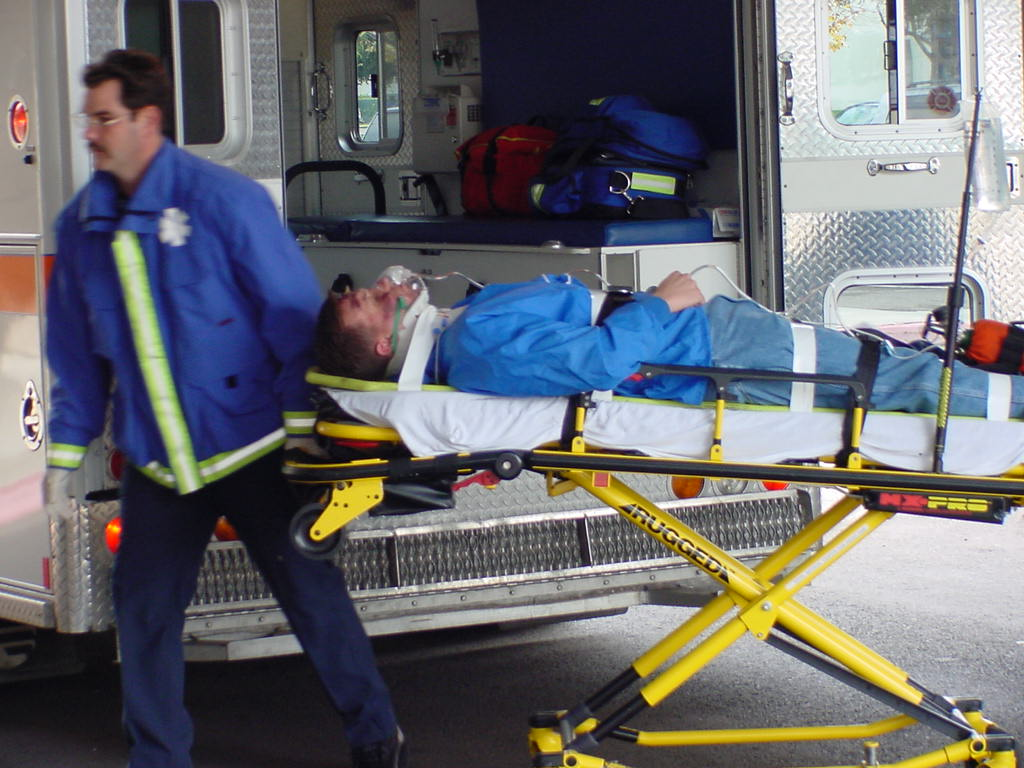
Arriving at hospital

Throughout the United States, there is variation in scope of practice between levels of care. 25/50 states in the US are part of the EMS Compact, following NREMT standards for certification. In addition to statewide variations, some agencies, counties, and regions under the direction of a medical director allow for additions to scope of practice. Typically, this is an addition of a medication, device, or other intervention. An example of this is the addition of an RSI credential to Paramedics.

A basic listing of qualification levels:

- Emergency Medical Responder (EMR): EMRs, provide basic, immediate care including bleeding control, CPR, AED, and emergency childbirth. EMRs, in general, are not permitted to transport patients, and act as first responders only. They can, however, transport to assist with an EMT or higher.
- Emergency Medical Technician (EMT): EMT includes all EMR skills, advanced oxygen and ventilation skills, pulse oximetry, noninvasive blood pressure monitoring, and administration of certain medications.
- Advanced Emergency Medical Technician (AEMT): AEMT includes all EMT skills, advanced airway devices, intravenous and intraosseous access, blood glucose monitoring, and administration of additional medications, typically basic crystalloid fluids and ACLS medications.
- Paramedic (see Paramedics in the United States): Paramedic is specialist health care provider, autonomous practitioner, providing advanced assessment and management skills, various invasive skills, and extensive pharmacology interventions, Paramedic is the highest level in EMS and its extension to the emergency physician .

Reciprocity - that is, recognition of one state's EMT certification being valid in another state - between states is somewhat limited, and after 30 years of operation by the National Registry of Emergency Medical Technicians, only about 40 states provide unlimited recognition of the NREMT certifications. In reality, there are at least 40 types of certification for EMS personnel within the United States, and many of these are recognized by no more than a single state. This creates significant challenges for the career mobility of many EMS providers, as they must often re-sit certification examinations each time they move from one state to another.

Medics in the United States

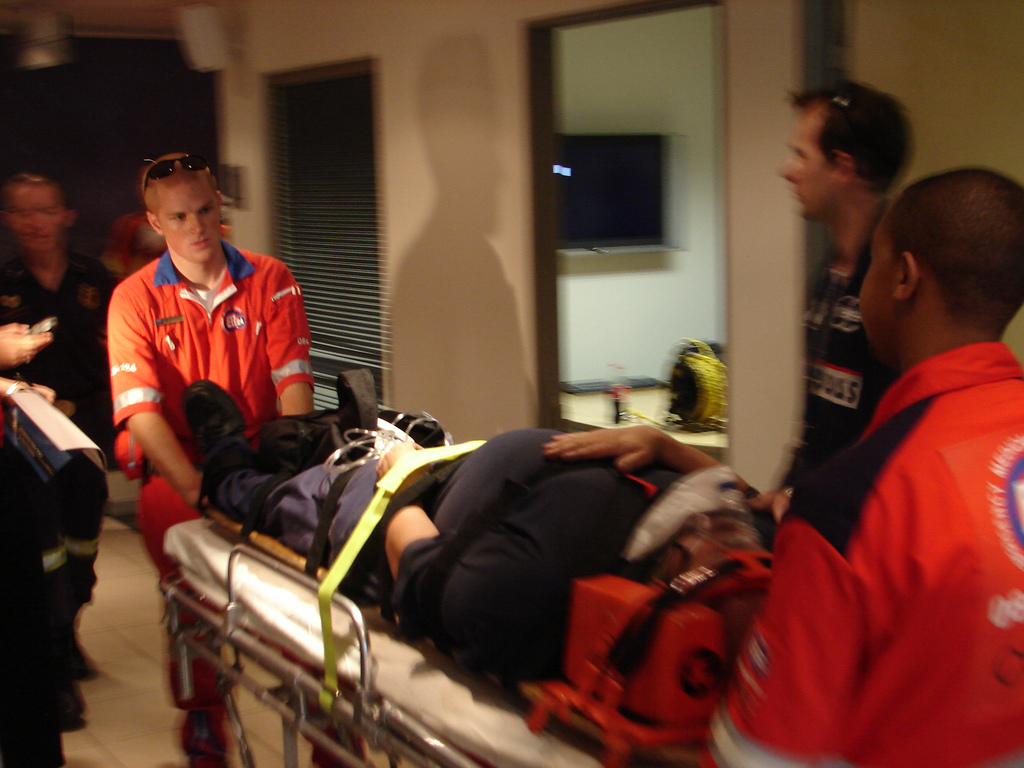
Safe at the hospital

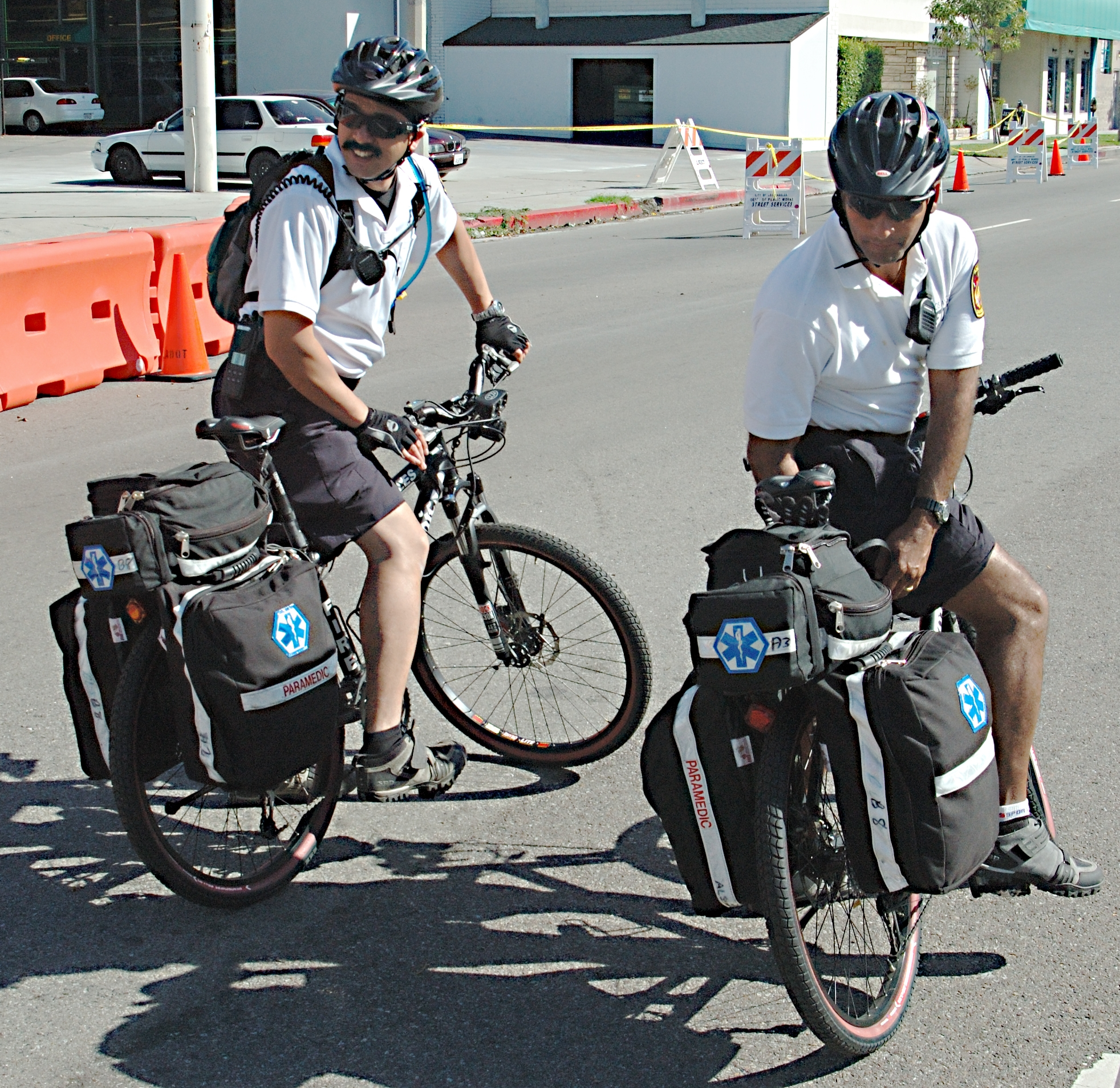
Special Events

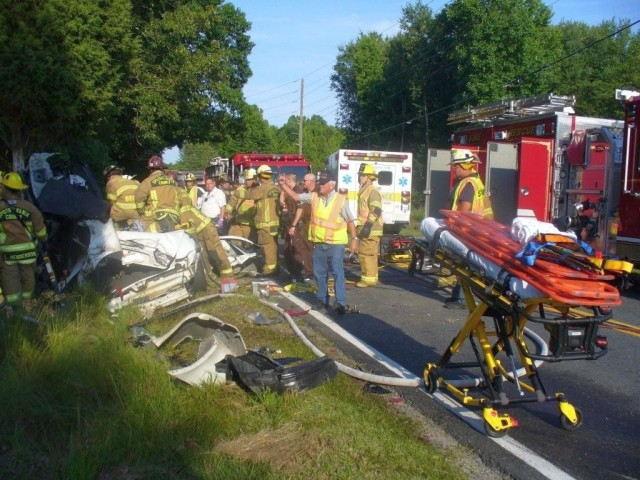
Trauma Care

=== Staffing ===
Ambulances in the United States must be staffed with a minimum of 2 personnel. The level of crew certification varies depending on the jurisdiction the ambulance is operating in. In most areas, the bare minimum is an EMT to provide patient care and an EMR to assist and drive the unit. This set-up would be classified as a Basic Life Support Unit (BLS) due to the fact that the highest ranking provider cannot perform Advanced Life Support (ALS) interventions. If patient condition warrants, an ALS provider may be summoned to assist and meet the ambulance en route to the hospital. Other staffing combinations include one EMT and one paramedic (the most common arrangement), or two Paramedics, which are classified in most areas as an Advanced Life Support Unit (ALS). Unlike in Europe, Emergency Physicians do not regularly practice in the field, and only crew ambulances for specialty situations, such as extreme-low-weight infant transports, extracorporeal membrane oxygenation (ECMO), or cardiac bypass transports, or unusual situations such as crush injuries necessitating field amputation, or mass casualty/disaster situations.

==== Funding and manpower models ====
EMS is sometimes provided by volunteers. Agencies that were once strictly volunteer have begun supplementing their ranks with compensated members in order to keep up with booming call volumes. As of 2004, the largest "Private Enterprise" provider of contract EMS services in North America was American Medical Response, based in Greenwood Village, Colorado. The second-largest US EMS provider is Rural/Metro Corporation, based in Scottsdale, Arizona; Rural/Metro Corporation also provides EMS services to parts of Latin America. Like AMR, Rural/Metro provided other transportation services, such as non-emergency transport and "coach", or wheelchair, transportation. On October 28, 2015, AMR announced that it had finalized the acquisition of Rural/Metro, forming the largest EMS organization in the United States and employing nearly 25,000 individuals.

Many colleges and universities now also have their own EMS agencies. Collegiate EMS programs vary somewhat from university to university; however, most agencies are fully staffed by student volunteers. Agencies might operate what is called a Quick Response Service (which does not transport patients but acts as a first responder to scenes) providing initial patient assessment and care, or they might operate certified ambulance services staffed with EMTs or Paramedics. Some groups limit services to within their campus, while others extend services to the surrounding community. Services provided by college and university agencies may include ambulance services, mass-casualty incident response, aero-medical services, and search-and-rescue teams.

While fire service in the US is rated based on ISO classes, and fire insurance rates (casualty insurance) are based on those classes, EMS does not receive ratings, nor are there corresponding monetary savings in health or life insurance policies. Unlike fire and police protection, which are recognize as an essential services by the Federal Government, it has been left to local governments to determine if emergency medical services are necessary for their communities. This lack of federal recognition as an essential service has left emergency medical services grossly underfunded throughout the United States, leading to service closures and gaps in coverage for citizens throughout the country.

=== Medical control ===
EMS providers work under the authority and indirect supervision of a medical director, or board-certified physician who oversees the policies and protocols of a particular EMS system or organization. Both the medical director and the actions they undertake are often referred to as "Medical Control".

Equipment and procedures are necessarily limited in the pre-hospital environment, and EMS professionals are trained to follow a formal and carefully designed decision tree (more commonly referred to as a "protocol") which has been approved by Medical Control. This protocol helps ensure a consistent approach to the most common types of emergencies the EMS professional may encounter. Medical Control may take place on-line, with the EMS personnel having to contact the physician for direction delegation for all Advanced Life Support (ALS) procedures, or off-line, with EMS personnel performing some or all of their ALS procedures on the basis of protocols or "standing orders". The NHTSA curriculum remains the Standard of Care for EMS organizations in the US.

=== Vehicles ===
==== Ground ambulances ====
Ambulances in the United States are defined by federal KKK-1822 Standards requirements, which define several categories of ambulances. In addition, most states have additional requirements according to their individual needs.

- Type I Ambulances are based on the chassis-cabs of light duty pickup-trucks,
- Type II Ambulances are based on modern passenger/cargo vans, referred to in the industry as Vanbulances.
- Type III Ambulances are based on chassis-cabs of light duty vans,

AD (Additional Duty) versions of both Type I and Type III designs are also defined. They include increased GVWR, storage and payload capacity.

Large American cities like New York and Los Angeles tend to have many distinct ambulance services, each with its own paint scheme and using all of the ambulance types mentioned above. Pedestrians and drivers in such cities must be alert for ambulances of many shapes, sizes, and colors. Most ambulances certified for emergency response in the U.S. are marked with the Star of Life for ready identification by the public.

EMS in the United States

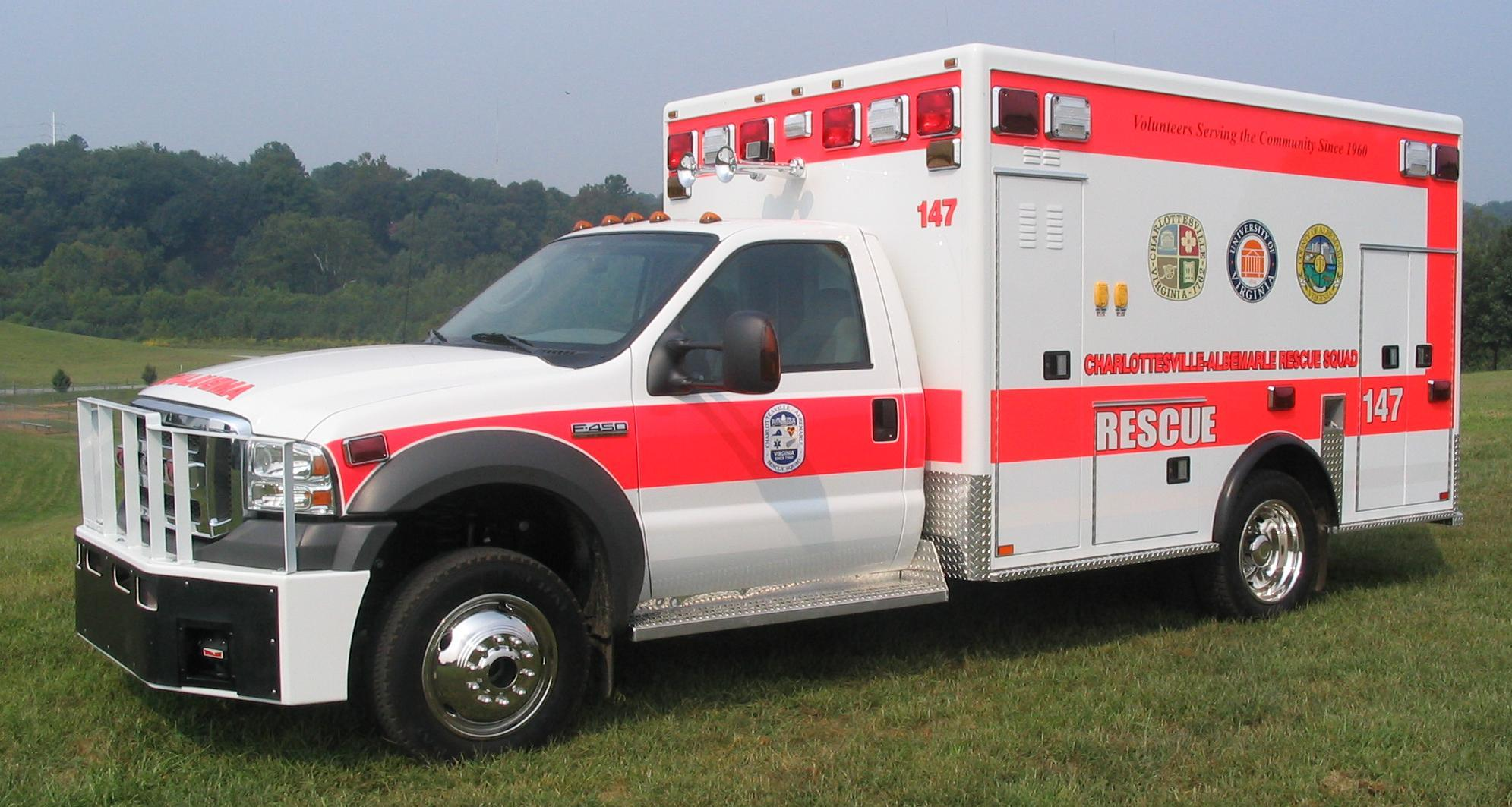
A typical Type I ambulance

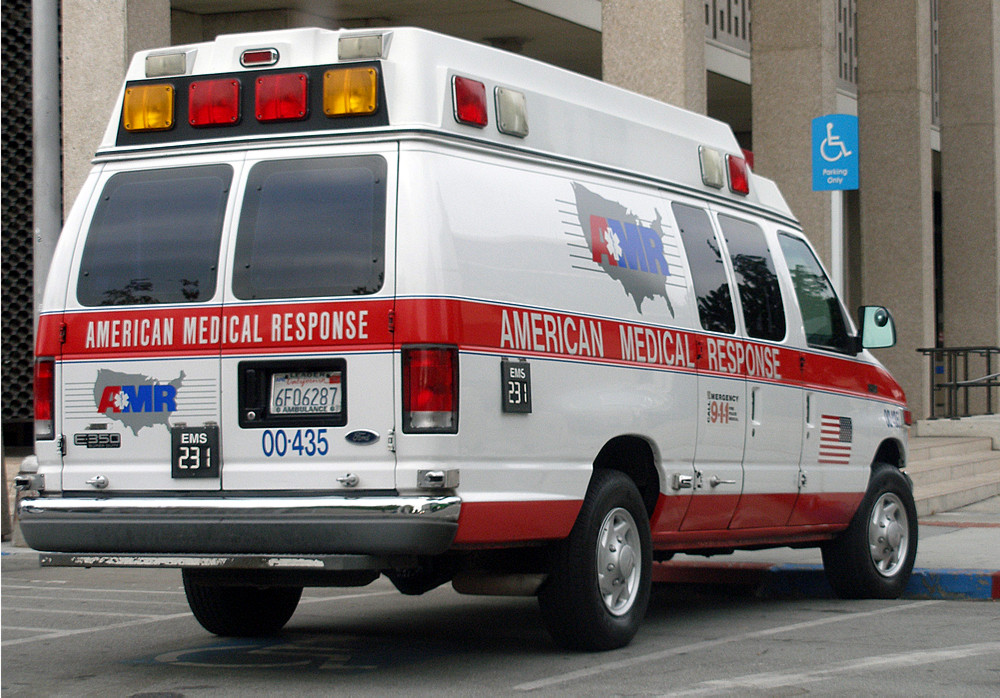
A typical Type II ambulance

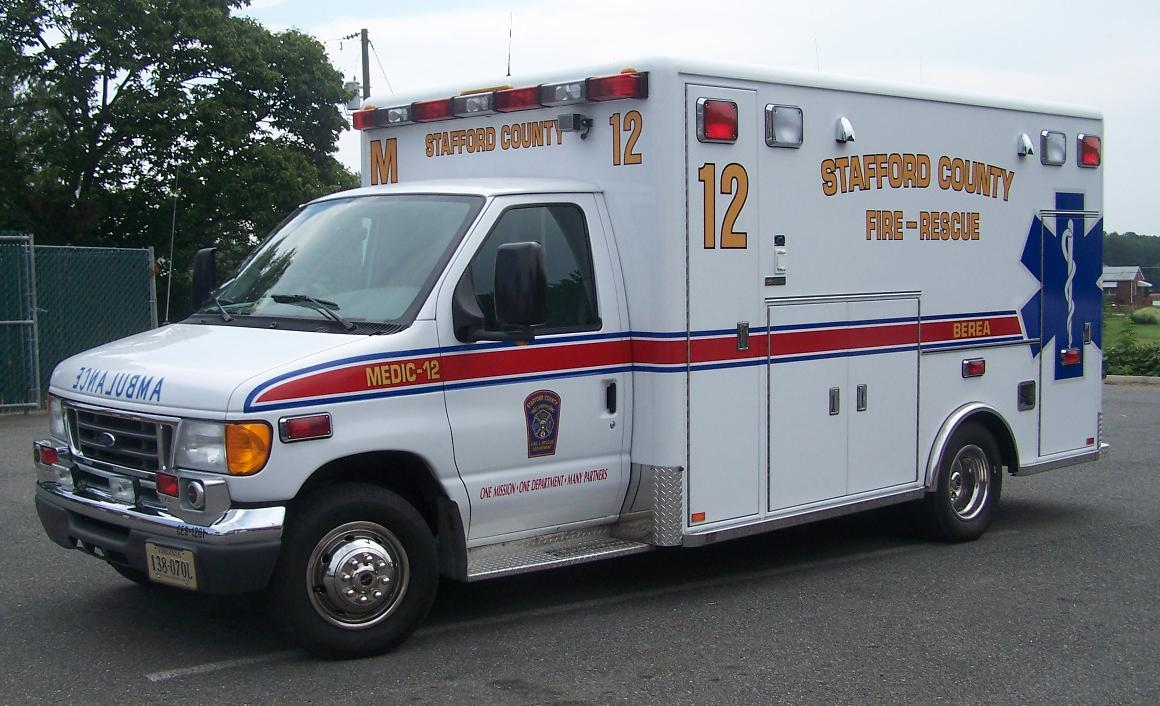
A typical Type III ambulance

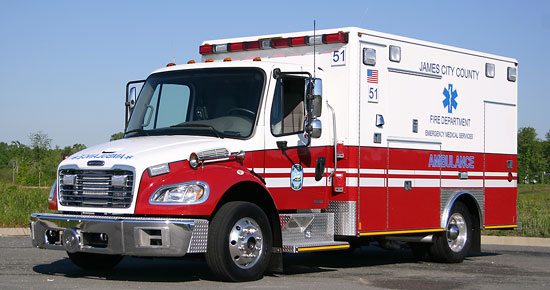
A typical Medium-Duty ambulance with commercial truck chassis

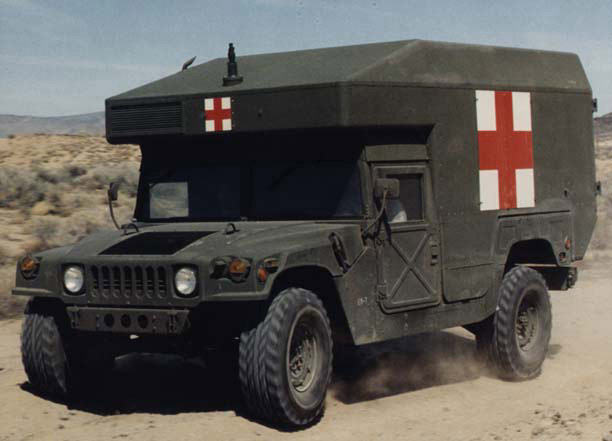
A typical Military Ambulance (US) based on HMMWV chassis

Medium-Duty combination Rescue/Ambulance

Ambulances may be supplemented or supported by vehicles that lack the capacity to transport a patient. The most common of these vehicles is known by several names, including "response car". Response cars are often equipped with much of the same equipment carried by an ambulance, but, since they are SUVs or large cars, they are often faster and nimbler. Response cars are staffed by one or more medical providers, and are used variously as a source of additional (or more skilled) manpower, as a supervisor's vehicle, or as a first response vehicle, enabling medical treatment to begin before the arrival of the ambulance.

Support Vehicles in the United States

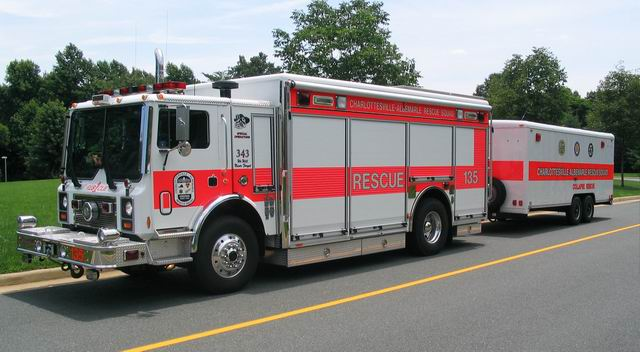
Typical Heavy Rescue Unit

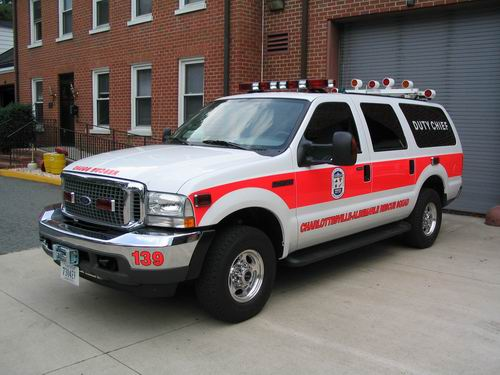
A typical SUV-based Paramedic, known as a First Responder Unit, Chase car or Fly-car

=== Dispatch ===
In the United States, there are as many methods of dispatching EMS resources as there are approaches to providing EMS service. In some larger communities, EMS may be self-dispatching. Where EMS is operated as a division of the Police or Fire Departments, it will generally be dispatched by those organizations. Dispatching may occur through state-licensed EMS dispatch centers, which are operated by one service but provide dispatch to several counties. In large centers, such as New York City, the statutory EMS provider (in the case of NYC, the FDNY) will dispatch not only their own vehicles, but also EMS resources belonging to hospitals, private companies, and even volunteers, within their own community. The national emergency number in the United States is 9-1-1. The number works for all three emergency services. In most cases, a 9-1-1 call will be answered at a central facility, usually referred to as a Public Safety Answering Point, and operated, in most cases, by the police. The needs of the caller are identified, and the call is routed to the dispatcher for the emergency service(s) required.

While some small communities continue to use "low-tech" approaches to dispatch, in many places in the U.S. the technology is quite advanced. Advanced technologies in use may include electronic mapping, Global Positioning System (GPS) or its first cousin Automatic vehicle location (AVL). The use of decision support software such as AMPDS is also common, as are surveillance "add-ons". As a result, many dispatchers are trained to a high level in their own right, triaging incoming calls by severity, and providing advice or medical guidance by telephone prior to the arrival of the ambulance or rescue squad on the scene. Some are certified as EMTs or paramedics in their own states, and increasingly, are becoming certified as Emergency Medical Dispatchers.

=== Response times ===
There is no official Federal or State standard for response times in the United States. Response time standards frequently do exist in the form of contractual obligations between communities and EMS provider organizations, however. As a result, there is typically considerable variation between standards in one community and another. New York City, for example, mandates a 10-minute response time on emergency calls, while some communities in California have moved response time standards to 12–15 minutes. It is generally accepted within the field that an "ideal" response time for emergency calls would be within eight minutes, ninety-percent of the time, but this objective is rarely achieved, and current research results question the validity of that standard. As call volumes increase and resources and funding fail to keep pace, even large EMS systems such as Pittsburgh, Pennsylvania struggle to meet these standards. Individuals who live in rural areas far from emergency services also may expect a longer wait due to the distance involved. This issue is further complicated by differing performance measurement methodologies. Some services count response time beginning at the moment that the telephone call is answered and running until an ambulance or response resource arrives at the scene, while others measure only the time from the notification of EMS personnel of the call, which is considerably shorter. Another issue which arises in urban areas is that the response time "clock" almost universally stops when the unit arrives in front of the address; in large office or apartment buildings, actually accessing the patient may take several minutes longer, but this is not considered in response time calculation or reporting.

== See also ==
- 9-1-1
- Ambulance
- Certified first responder
- List of EMS provider credentials
- Emergency medical services
- Emergency medical dispatcher
- Emergency medical technician
- Emergency medical responder levels by state
- Emergency medicine
- Friendly caller program
- Paramedics in the United States
- Paramedic
- Urgent care center § In the United States
