= Pittsburgh Bureau of Emergency Medical Services =

Medical rescue and ambulance service

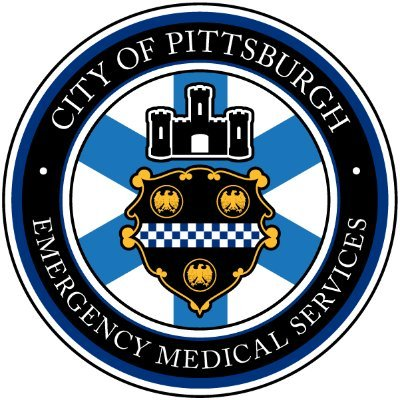
- Seal of the Pittsburgh Bureau of EMS

Operational area
- Country: United States
- State: Pennsylvania
- City: Pittsburgh

Agency overview
- Established: October 15, 1975; 50 years ago
- Employees: 211 (2019): Uniformed Providers: 209; Civilian staff: 2
- Annual budget: $22,910,271 2019
- Staffing: Career
- Bureau Chief: Amera Gilchrist
- EMS level: ALS/BLS
- Motto: "The Best Care Anywhere"

Facilities and equipment
- Divisions: 3
- Stations/Facilities: 16
- ALS Medic Units: 13 – normal staffing (scheduled 24/7); 11 – reserve/emergency
- BLS Ambulances: 3 – normal staffing (scheduled 24/7); 2 – reserve/emergency
- HAZMAT: 1
- Heavy Rescue: 3
- Special/Technical Rescues: 3
- River Rescue boats: 4
- Other boats (inflatables): 5
- Hovercraft: 1
- TEMS Units: 2
- Infectious Disease response: 3
- Swift Water/Flood Response units: 4
- ALS Motorcycles: 4
- Bicycle units: 4
- Mass Casualty Unit: 1
- ATV/Carts: 4
- Prehospital Physician response: 3

Website
- Official website
- Union website (FAPP)

The Pittsburgh Bureau of Emergency Medical Services (PEMS) provides emergency medical services and medically directed rescue services for the City of Pittsburgh, Pennsylvania. It is a bureau of the Department of Public Safety (DPS), along with the Bureaus of Police, Administration, Fire, and Animal Care and Control. The department is responsible for 55.5 square miles (144 km^{2}) with a population of 305,841 as of the 2013 Census estimation. The Bureau was founded in 1975 by the then current city administration, absorbing Freedom House Ambulance. In addition, the Bureau of EMS was one of the first EMS agencies in North America.

== History ==
Prior to any formal prehospital care system in the United States, the Pittsburgh Bureau of Police and local funeral homes provided "scoop and run" transportation services, entirely lacking any resemblance of modern medical care; instead, they provided only the 'run' portion. The PBP commonly utilized their "paddy waggons" due to their versatility, and the funeral homes doubled hearses as ambulances to transport the sick and dying to the hospital, and more than likely, later to the funeral home. In 1968, Freedom House Ambulance was born out of an existing organization, Freedom House Enterprises, a nonprofit dedicated to establishing and supporting black-run businesses in the city. Freedom House Ambulance provided emergency care and some rescue services in the city's Hill District and other predominantly black neighborhoods, as the police already covered responses to the rest of the city, composed mostly of affluent white communities.

On October 15, 1975, the Pittsburgh Bureau of Emergency Medical Services began coverage and delivery of prehospital care and rescue services to the City of Pittsburgh.

== Organization ==
The Bureau of EMS is separated into three divisions: the Ambulance Division, Rescue Division and Training Division, each of which are commanded by a Division Chief.

=== Ambulance Division ===
The Ambulance Division of the Pittsburgh Bureau of EMS is the main arm of the EMS Bureau and consists of the city's 13 frontline medic units (staffed by two paramedics), three frontline ambulances (staffed by two EMTs). The Medic Units and Ambulances are responsible for answering calls for medical assistance within the city limits.

=== Rescue Division ===
The Rescue Division consists of the city's two frontline rescue trucks, fully equipped with heavy rescue equipment for every heavy rescue response. These units also have a full complement of Advanced Life Support (ALS) equipment. They are stationed with medic units and are staffed by three Rescue Paramedics. The Rescue Division is responsible for answering calls for medical and rescue assistance within the city limits, from possible jumper/suicide/psych calls for service to automotive or boat collisions to hazardous materials responses. To respond to these requests for service, the Division uses many resources and specialty units available such as some of the following: River Rescue, Hazmat Team, TEMS Medics, Swiftwater Rescue and Flood Response units, and staff contribution to the regional or federal (FEMA) US&R and DMAT units.

=== Training Division ===
The Training Division is overseen by the Patient Care Coordinator who also typically holds the rank of Division Chief. The Training Division provides all annual training requirements for the Bureau's personnel, including but not limited to AHA ACLS, PALS and NRP, NREMT clinical care requirements, PHTLS and AMLS. The division also provides quarterly trainings for all providers consisting of continuing education classes for the implementation of new treatment modalities, rescue medicine training, clinical quality assurance training, and occasional lectures from any of the city's medical directors. The Training Division, located in the Strip District, also coordinates or provides the training required for the Bureau's specialty units, whether coordinating with the other DPS Bureaus or outside entities.

The Division Chief responsible for Training, is also responsible for Special Events and Emergency Preparedness. The Division Chief coordinates with the city's Special Event Office of the DPS Administration Bureau to provide Advanced Life Support (ALS) coverage for all permitted events within the city limits. This can include staffing venues such as PNC Park and Heinz Field, homes to the Pittsburgh Pirates and Steelers respectively, providing coverage for the Pittsburgh Marathon and many 5K and 10K races around Pittsburgh (including the nationally recognized Richard S. Caliguiri City of Pittsburgh Great Race), and the annual regatta. To facilitate these requests the EMS Bureau will sometimes utilize different assets to bring ALS care to the residents and visitors of the City of Pittsburgh including but not limited to ALS equipped motorcycles, bicycles, carts or ATV's, and river boats. In addition to Special Events, the Division Chief also coordinates disaster and MCI planning with the Office of Emergency Management.

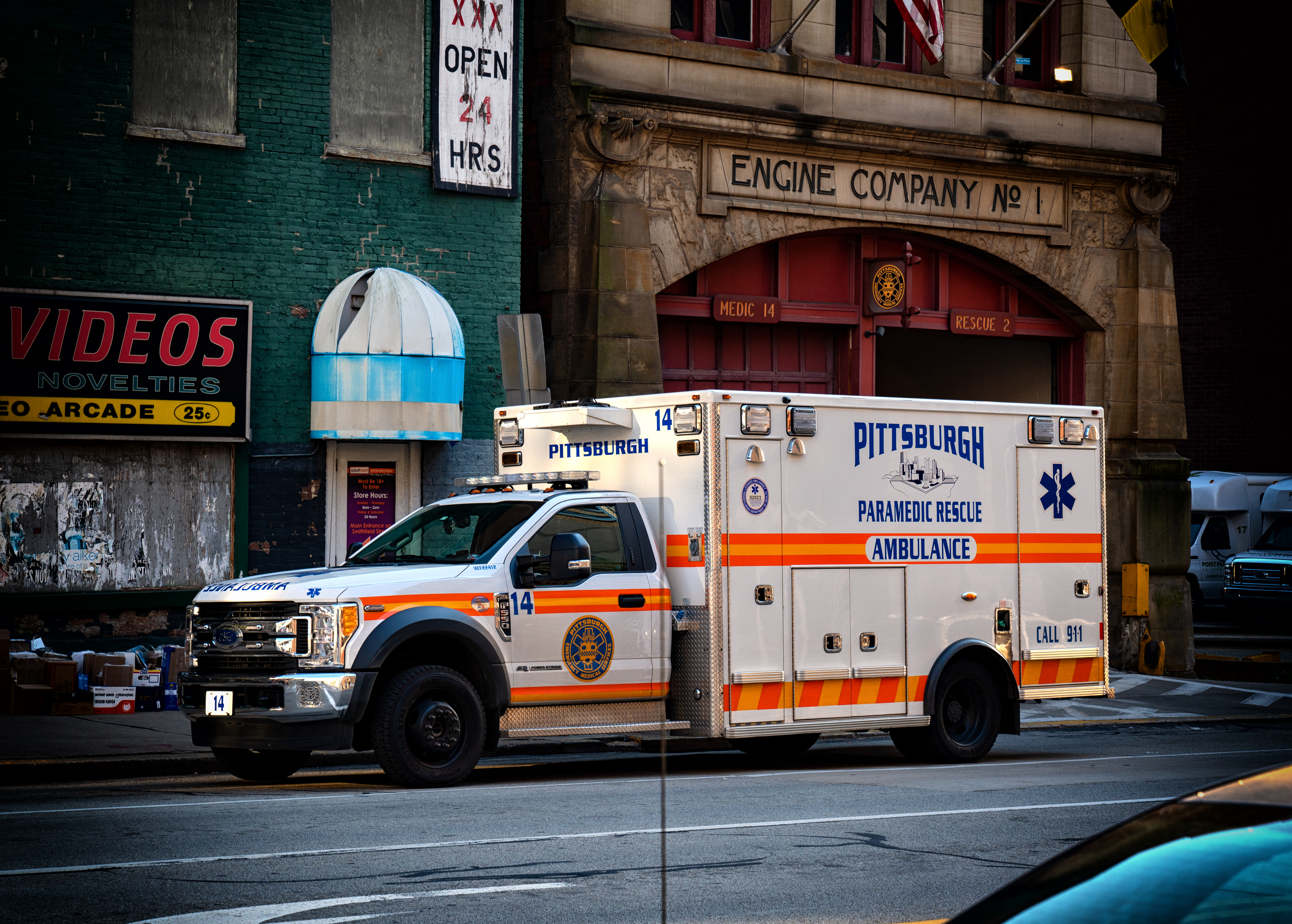
Medic 14 in downtown Pittsburgh

== Specialty units ==
=== River Rescue ===
Pittsburgh EMS contributes to the city's joint EMS and Police River Rescue unit, which is staffed by two PEMS Paramedic/Public Safety Rescue Divers, and a PBP Officer/Helmsman. River Rescue operates a multitude of equipment including a new river boat recently delivered (2020) from Lake Assault Boats out of Michigan, two Boston Whalers, a fan boat that allows River Rescue to operate in and above ice in the winter, and a plethora of inflatable craft, some of which are stored on the Bureau's rescue trucks. Out of the water the Rescue Division operates a dive rescue truck that is used to aid River Rescue with prolonged river dive operations, or transport divers from their station in PNC Park to water rescue/recovery details not accessible from the rivers. River Rescue responds to request for service on the three rivers with the Commonwealth of Pennsylvania Fish and Boat Commission and the United States Coast Guard. River Rescue as a joint DPS asset with Police and EMS allows River Rescue to provide a police presence on the water in the region, as well as to the Port of Pittsburgh, the nation's second largest inland port. Upon assignment to River Rescue, the paramedic divers complete an extremely rigorous initial training, as well as vast hours of refresher training throughout the year, in both the classroom and under the water. River Rescue also has the only ALS Licensed boats in the Commonwealth of Pennsylvania.

=== US&R/DMAT ===
Assigned to the Rescue Division is the Bureau's trench rescue truck, which carries additional equipment for trench rescue and structural collapse to be used in addition to the equipment from the first arriving rescue truck. Many personnel from any division are members of the FEMA or NDMS units that are based out of the region.

=== Hazmat ===
A joint City unit that the division participates in is the Hazmat team, of which the EMS Bureau houses the City Hazmat truck and supplies the team with all of its Paramedic/Hazardous Materials Technicians. As Hazmat is a joint DPS operation, all of the Hazmat units being owned by the Office of Emergency Management, with personnel contribution from the Police and Fire Bureaus as well.

=== Flood Response and Swiftwater Rescue ===
On the water, the Rescue Division responds to all water rescue details within the city limits, when off of the three rivers, with Swift Water Rescue assets. At the request of the Director of Public Safety, all three Bureaus, EMS, Police and Fire have flood response units which are composed of Bureau personnel trained to the Pennsylvania Fish and Boat Commission Swift Water Rescue Operations level. Above the Operations level, the Bureau of EMS provides Swift Water Rescue units staffed with Paramedic/SWR Technicians, trained to Fish and Boat's Technician level. All River Rescue divers complete their Fish and Boat Commission SWR training when they attend their initial dive training.

=== Tactical Emergency Medical Services (TEMS)/SWAT Paramedics ===
The EMS Bureau contributes Tactical Paramedics to the Bureau of Police's SWAT Team. These TEMS paramedics are members of the SWAT Team, selected by Police after completion of a rigorous SWAT qualifying course, that have completed their additional tactical training, firearms qualifications and additional trauma care training. The SWAT Team has its own medical director that permits its members to provide advanced high-quality care under fire, and is an elite group of personnel that serve proudly on the PBP SWAT Team.

=== Cycle Unit ===
The PEMS Cycle Unit operates four Harley Davidson Electra Glide motorcycles. Paramedics that successfully bid the Cycle Unit complete and initial 80 hour training program with the PBP Motor Unit. All Cycle paramedics complete an annual 40 hour safety refresher also hosted by and completed with the Police Motor Unit. These assets are typically utilized for coverage of special events throughout the City including but not limited to Heinz Field football games, races and the annual regatta.

=== Infectious Disease Unit ===
In response to the Ebola outbreak in 2014 and COVID-19 (SARS-CoV-2) crisis, the division coordinated with the Training Division and the Infectious Disease and Epidemiology Unit (created during the and dubbed the 'ECHO' Team due to the E in epidemiology and the citywide unit identification system) to stand up Infectious Disease units, referred to as ECHO Units.

== Rank structure ==
There are many ranks that a provider can hold within Pittsburgh EMS. Recruits graduate from the Training Division after a number of months, receiving training in operational policies, procedures and standards of care. Before training can be completed, recruits are assigned to units throughout the city for a field training period. Paramedic grades 1 through 5, a pay grade being achieved for each year of service up to five years. After two years of service in rank, an employee with the rank of Paramedic is eligible to sit for the Crew Chief exam, similar to that of a Sergeant or Lieutenant exam, which is administered by the Department of HR and Civil Service. Promotions above the rank of Crew Chief are completed through an interview and selection process, where the final succeeding candidate is promoted at the recommendation of the Director of Public Safety. The highest-ranking official is the EMS Bureau's Chief followed by the rest of his/her command staff.

On April 5, 2023, Amera Gilchrist was sworn in as the 8th Chief of the Bureau of Emergency Medical Services. She is the first African-American and first woman to lead the bureau.

Title	Insignia	Sleeve stripes	Badge color
Chief		One bold gold stripe	Gold
Deputy Chief		One bold gold stripe	Gold
Assistant Chief		One bold gold stripe	Gold
Division Chief		One bold gold stripe	Gold
District Chief		One bold gold stripe	Gold
Crew Chief		Two thin gold stripes	Gold
Paramedic (PM1-5)	None	One strip - black braid	Silver
Senior EMT	None	None	Gold
EMT	None	None	Silver
