= Walter S. Graf =

American cardiologist (1917–2015)

Walter Samuel Graf
- Born: July 15, 1917; New York City, New York
- Died: October 18, 2015 (aged 98); Los Angeles, California
- Occupation: Cardiologist
- Known for: A pioneer in establishing the paramedic emergency care system

Walter Samuel Graf (July 15, 1917 – October 18, 2015) was an American cardiologist. He was a pioneer in establishing paramedic emergency care, "one of a handful of doctors who created the modern paramedic emergency system".

== Early life and education ==
He was born in New York City, the son of a high-end jewelry designer, and raised in The Bronx. He attended the City College of New York and received his medical degree from the University of California, San Francisco in 1942. During World War II he served as an Army physician in Europe and North Africa.

== Career ==
He had a private practice in Los Angeles as a cardiologist, primarily at the Daniel Freeman Memorial Hospital in Inglewood, California, and also at Los Angeles County Hospital, both of which he served as chief of staff. He was a clinical professor for Loma Linda University and the University of Southern California, and chaired both the State Commission on Emergency Medical Services and the California Medical Association Committee on Emergency Medicine.

== Emergency medical care ==
During the 1960s he created a dedicated coronary care unit at Daniel Freeman Memorial Hospital, thought to be the first such unit on the West Coast. He became concerned about the lack of actual medical care being given to coronary patients during emergency transportation to a hospital. In 1969, while serving as president of the Los Angeles Chapter of the American Heart Association, he created a "mobile critical care unit", consisting of a Chevrolet Van, a registered nurse, and a portable defibrillator. He was inspired in part by the work of Frank Pantridge, inventor of the portable defibrillator, who had established a mobile coronary critical care unit in Belfast, Northern Ireland.

Also in 1969 his patient Kenneth Hahn, a member of the Los Angeles County Board of Supervisors, persuaded the Supervisors to approve a pilot program to train county firefighters as "Mobile Intensive Care Paramedics". A change in state law was necessary to allow personnel other than doctors and nurses to render emergency medical care. Graf helped to write the Wedworth-Townsend Paramedic Act of 1970, which was signed into law by Governor Ronald Reagan on July 15, 1970, despite opposition from doctors, nurses, and attorneys. Reagan first sought assurance from Hahn that paramedics would be allowed to cross city lines freely within Los Angeles County, recalling that his father had died in 1940 of a heart attack after a Los Angeles-based ambulance was restricted from entering Beverly Hills to attend to him.

Paramedic training began the next month at the Freeman Hospital under Graf's direction. It was the first nationally accredited paramedic training program in the United States. A 1973 follow-up study of transported cardiac patients indicated that trained paramedic firefighters performed as well as nurses; that trained personnel performed equally well whether using the special coronary response van or a regular ambulance; and that response time was twice as fast when paramedics were called compared to when a physician was called. The program he started at Freeman Hospital merged with the UCLA Center for Prehospital Care in 1999. Paramedic training was carried out at the old Freeman Hospital location, in a building known as the Walter S. Graf Center, before moving to 5220 Pacific Concourse Drive in 2015.

== Personal life ==
Graf was married four times and had nine children and stepchildren. He died in Los Angeles on October 18, 2015, at the age of 98. He is buried at the Hillside Memorial Park in Los Angeles.
