= Tom Lynch (BMX rider) =

M.B.E. Tom Lynch
- Born: 1970 (age 55–56)
- Employer: NHS London Ambulance Service

Tom Lynch had the idea for the first London Ambulance Cycle Response Unit (CRU), with the aim of providing emergency response by bicycle in areas which would be difficult or impossible to get to in a traditional ambulance.

== Early life ==
Tom Lynch rode bikes in the hills where he grew up, progressing to motocross bikes and then to BMX in the early 1980s. He had an accident at school when he was 11 years old and remembers the calmness of the ambulance crew.

== Careers ==
=== BMX ===
Lynch started winning BMX competitions at the age of 16 and over a period of nearly 15 years won many British and international championships, including in the elite superclass. He was the first official British BMX cycling coach.

=== London Ambulance Service ===
In the early 1990s, following his BMX career, Lynch trained with the patient transport services at the London Ambulance Service. He then also trained as an Emergency Medical Technician. He now works as Cycle Response Unit (CRU) Operations Officer at London Ambulance Service HQ in Waterloo (Cycle Team Hub).

== Cycle Response Unit (CRU) ==
=== Initial Trial ===
A trial of the idea for a CRU was set up in 1999 in the West End of London.

Lynch's connections to the bicycle industry enabled him to contribute to the design of the bikes used in the trial, an example of which can be seen in the Medicine Wellcome Galleries at the Science Museum, London.

=== Trial Expansion ===
The trial was a success and the London CRU expanded to Heathrow Airport in 2004, the City of London in 2006 and Kensington and Knightsbridge, Croydon town centre, Canary Wharf and the area around St Pancras International station in 2008. Since then other cities in the UK have also set up CRUs.

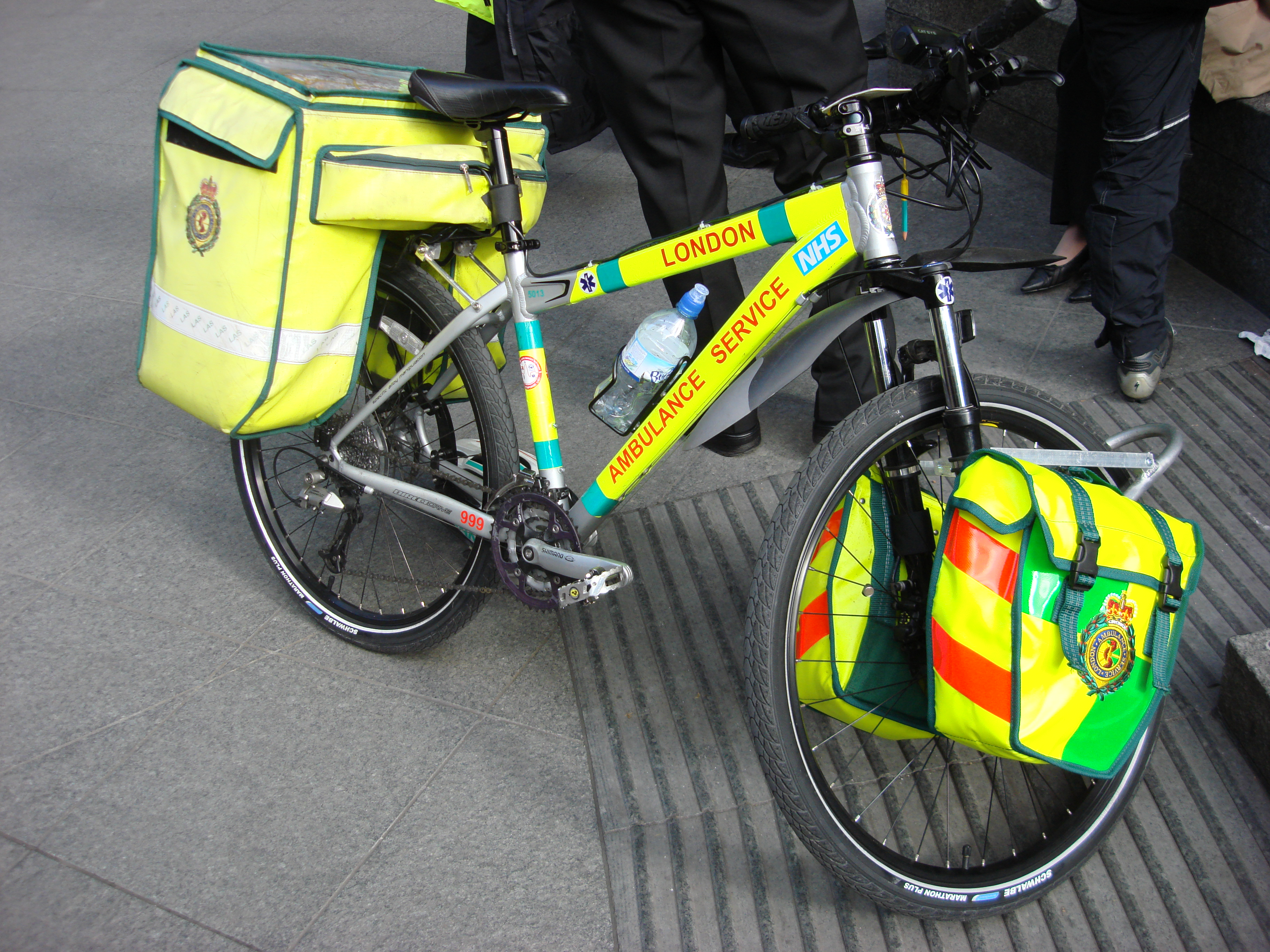
An NHS Bicycle Ambulance

=== Cycle Response Bicycles ===
Cycle Response Units originally used cycle response bicycles based on a mountain bike, painted bright yellow and fitted with blue lights and a siren. Now the service is starting to use e-bikes, which are heavier but are more efficient.

=== Cycle Responders ===
Cycle responders carry life saving equipment on the bike, weighing a total of about 23kgs.They wear specialist clothing and usually have special bike training. The BMX helmet, used by Lynch as part of his CRU uniform, together with a bicycle and associated equipment, can be seen in the Medicine Wellcome Galleries at the Science Museum, London.

Cycle responders resolve over 50 per cent of all incidents at the scene, their average response time to calls is six minutes and they can cycle 100km in a single 10/12-hour shift.

== Awards ==
Lynch was awarded an MBE in the 2007 New Years Honours for services to Bicycle Moto Cross (BMX) racing and Ambulance Service Cycling.
