= Accidental Death and Disability: The Neglected Disease of Modern Society =

1966 report by the National Academy of Sciences

Accidental Death and Disability: The Neglected Disease of Modern Society is a 1966 report by the National Academy of Sciences. It is considered a landmark in the development of the emergency medical services system in the United States.

In the research report, the National Academy of Sciences—National Research Council Committees on Trauma and Shock, a federally funded department of the government, concluded, in part, that both the public and government were "insensitive to the magnitude of the problem of accidental death and injury" in the U.S.; that the standards to which ambulance services were held were diverse and "often low"; and that "most ambulances used in this country are unsuitable, have incomplete ... equipment, carry inadequate supplies, and are manned by untrained attendants."

The report led to the design and implementation of the first federally qualified ambulance services and personnel in the US. The reforms inaugurated by the publication of "The White Paper" led to higher quality care provided on-scene and in-transit by trained paramedics and emergency medical technicians (EMT)s.

== See also ==
- Freedom House Ambulance Service
