= Cycle responder =

Medical emergency response via bicycle

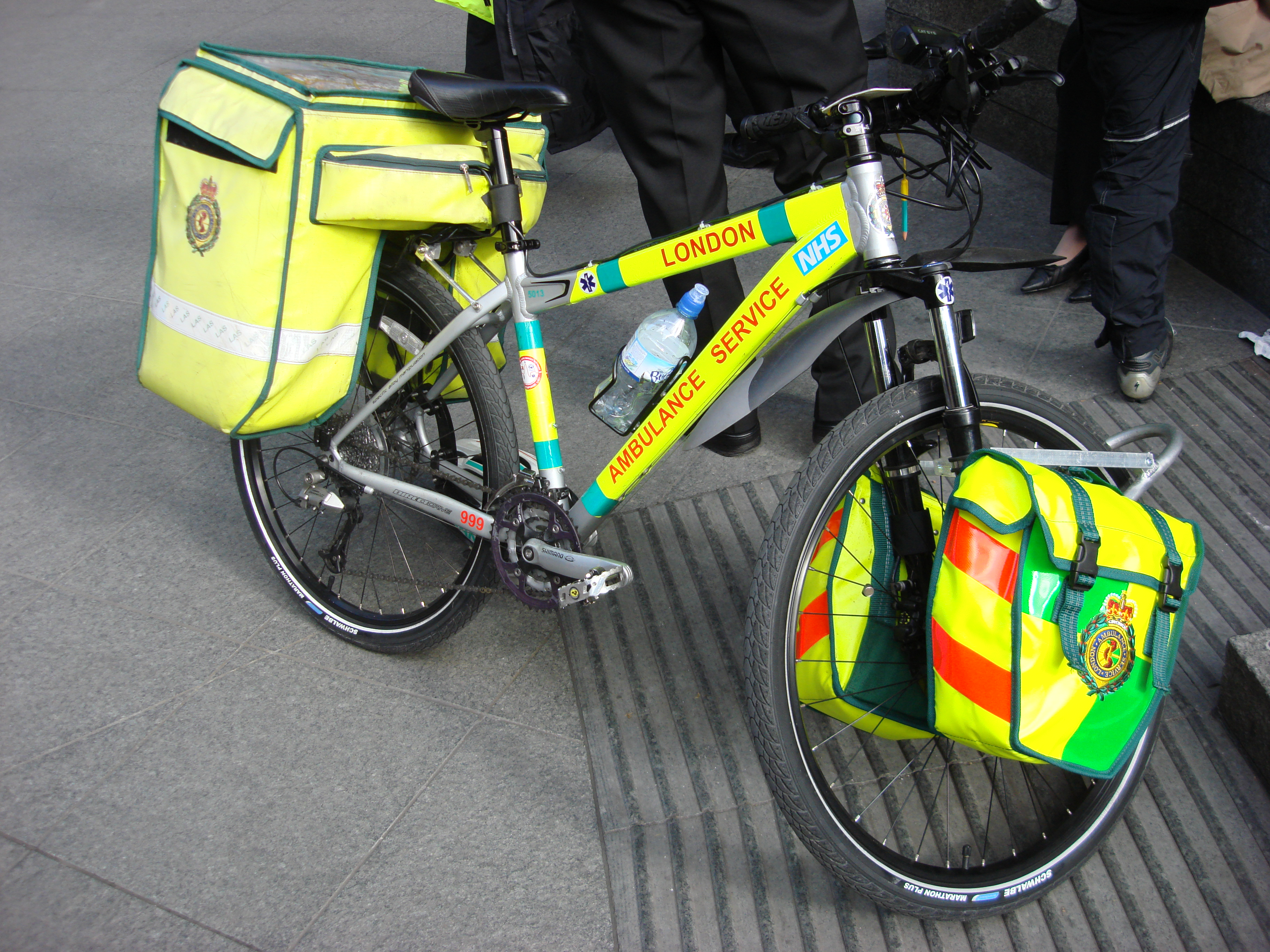
Response bicycle of the London Ambulance Service

A cycle responder is a medically trained responder, such as a paramedic or first aider that uses a bicycle to respond to a medical emergency. They are used by professional ambulance services to respond to emergency calls and also by private and voluntary providers of medical cover at events.

Cycle responders are provided in order to provide fast, effective medical assistance to patients in areas in which a traditional road ambulance or response car would have a delayed response time, and where responders on foot may not be fast enough, or cannot provide sufficient cover over an area.

This means that they are primarily deployed in areas of high traffic congestion, such as city centres, with large cities such as London and Manchester making extensive use of them. They are also used in specialist applications such as inside large shopping precincts and airport terminals, and for covering first aid at events.

== History ==
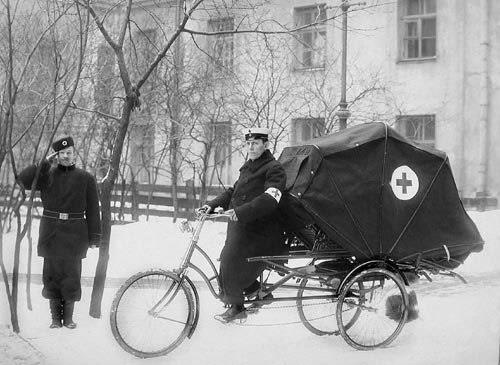
Bicycle ambulance service in Russian Empire

First aid response on bicycles has been used by event first aid organisations since at least the 1990s, to provide rapid response over an event site.

Cycle responders for ambulance work were piloted by London Ambulance Service in 2000, as the idea of paramedic Tom Lynch, based at the Waterloo ambulance station. The trial successfully demonstrated that response times to pedestrianised areas were reduced, and with the responder able to deal with a number of illnesses and injuries, the single cycle saved over 250 hours of ambulance availability per 6 months.

St John Ambulance operate the largest fleet of cycles in the country.

== Equipment ==
The equipment carried by cycle responders will vary depending upon role and the level to which the rider is trained. Typically the responder will carry oxygen and a defibrillator as these are primary basic life support items for dealing with conditions such as cardiac arrest. They may also carry additional equipment including airway management equipment (such as airways or bag valve masks) and drugs appropriate to their skill level. They are also likely to carry first aid equipment such as bandages and dressings.

The equipment can be carried on the bike (in panniers), or on the responder's body (using a rucksack or modified utility jacket).

== Training ==
Some organisations operating cycle responders offer specific training to staff or volunteers undertaking the role. They may use their own training, or conform to an external standard, such as Bikeability or the International Police Mountain Bike Association (IPMBA).

Training may cover areas such as hazard avoidance, observation, how to manoeuvre in low speed areas, traffic, safety and crowds.

== See also ==
- Motorcycle ambulances have an overlapping role.
- Police bicycle, used by police forces to patrol areas inaccessible to police cars or wider than by foot
