= James O. Page =

American firefighter

James O. Page JD (August 7, 1936 – September 4, 2004) was recognized as a leading authority on United States emergency medical services (EMS). James was born in Alhambra, California, and frequently moved between California and Kansas as a youth. After holding a number of jobs, including an ambulance attendant in East Los Angeles, he received his first job in the fire service with Monterey Park Fire Department. After failing a medical clearance with Los Angeles City Fire Department Page served in the Los Angeles County Fire Department for 16 years rising to the rank of Battalion Chief. While working with the department, he began his studies in law at Southwestern Law School. Recognizing an opportunity, management in the Los Angeles County Fire Department placed problematic firefighters under Page's supervision hoping that his litigious training would hasten their dismissal. However, Page refused to serve as the department's "executioner."

In 1973 he was appointed as the first director of North Carolina's statewide EMS system. North Carolina gained a national reputation for excellence in pre-hospital care during his tenure. In 1975, he was appointed as Executive Director of Lakes Area Emergency Medical Services in Buffalo, NY and spearheaded the development and implementation of the 8-county western New York EMS system.

During the early 1970s Jim Page served as a technical advisor for NBC Television's popular show Emergency! Co-creator Jack Webb initially intended to use Page's name for a character in the show but Page declined, stating that he was already "too visible". Thus, the character "Jim Page" became "John Gage", paramedic. This program captured the US public's imagination and created a public demand for quality pre-hospital care. In 1976, Page took the leadership reins of the ACT Foundation, becoming a popular public speaker, advisor, and author of topics in emergency medicine.

In 2000, Page co-founded the law firm, Page Wolfberg & Wirth, with a practice focused on Emergency Medical Services law.

Page published several books and magazines about the EMS community.

Page died suddenly on September 4, 2004, at the age of 67 while swimming at a health club in Carlsbad, California. A memorial service was held in Carlsbad on September 16, 2004, attended by hundreds of EMS and fire service professionals. Eulogists included Chief Alan Brunacini, William Atkinson and Douglas Wolfberg, Esq.
