= Freedom House Ambulance Service =

First American emergency medical service staffed by paramedics

- Successor: Pittsburgh Bureau of Emergency Medical Services
- Established: 1967; 59 years ago
- Founders: Phil Hallen, Peter Safar
- Founded at: Hill District (Pittsburgh)
- Defunct: October 15, 1975; 51 years ago
- Purpose: Humanitarian
- Location: Pittsburgh, Pennsylvania, United States
- Products: Ambulance design, later adopted by the National Highway Traffic Safety Administration
- Services: Paramedics staffed emergency medical services
- Medical Director: Dr. Nancy Caroline
- Key people: Dr. Ron Stewart, Dr. Paul Paris
- Parent organization: Freedom House Enterprises
- Affiliations: The Maurice Falk Medical Fund

Freedom House Ambulance Service was the first emergency medical service in the United States to be staffed by paramedics with medical training beyond basic first aid. Founded in 1967 to serve the predominantly Black Hill District of Pittsburgh, Pennsylvania, it was staffed entirely by African Americans. Freedom House Ambulance Service broke medical ground by training its personnel to previously unheard-of standards of emergency medical care for patients en route to hospitals. The paramedic training and ambulance design standards pioneered in the Freedom House Ambulance Service would set the standard for emergency care nationally and even internationally. Despite its successes, the ambulance service was closed eight years after it began operating.

== Background ==
Prior to the mid 1960s, ambulance service in the US was typically provided by either the police or a local funeral home. Such services provided, at most, basic first aid and rapid transportation to a hospital. In police-operated ambulances, the ambulance crew would typically load the patient into the back of a police van, and rush to the hospital. The U.S. medical system had yet to incorporate advances in emergency care made in battlefield medicine. Suburbanization in the U.S. following World War II led to more car accidents and more injuries far from hospitals, exacerbating this lack of medical care provided en route to hospitals.

In 1966, the National Academy of Sciences published a white paper titled "Accidental Death and Disability: The Neglected Disease of Modern Society." The paper stated that up to 50,000 deaths each year were the result of inadequate ambulance crews and lack of suitable hospitals within range, drawing attention to the need for improved pre-hospital care. The severity of the situation in Pittsburgh was brought home when the former Governor of Pennsylvania and former mayor of Pittsburgh, David L. Lawrence, suffered a heart attack and was transported to a local hospital by police. Lawrence had no brain activity when he arrived at the hospital and died after being removed from life support, a death that could have been avoidable with adequate pre-hospital care, in the view of the physician who treated him, Peter Safar.

In Pittsburgh, the city police handled ambulance service within the city, transporting patients via paddy wagon while funeral homes provided ambulance service in the suburbs. Wait times were often longer for service in predominantly Black neighborhoods, especially in the economically depressed Hill District. Additionally, tension between police and the community made many reluctant to call the police.

== Inception ==
The program received its initial funding from Lyndon Johnson's War on Poverty and the Maurice Falk Fund. The Falk Fund was headed by Phil Hallen, a former ambulance driver, who was seeking to improve responses to medical emergencies as well as create employment opportunities for African-American men in Pittsburgh.

Upon hearing that Hallen was working to improve ambulance service in Pittsburgh, Dr. Peter Safar reached out to him. Safar's daughter had died of an asthma attack following transportation to the hospital without provision of care en route, and he had previously worked on emergency pre-hospital care, including the development of cardiopulmonary resuscitation and advocating its use by laypeople. He offered his ideas on how a new standard of care could be provided by the new ambulance service. His ideas included intense paramedic training and improved ambulance design.

Hallen contacted Freedom House Enterprises to help recruit paramedics for the new ambulance service. At that time, Freedom House Enterprises worked on civil rights projects including voter registration and organizing NAACP meetings as well as offering job training and assistance with job searches to Black Pittsburghers. Freedom House agreed to partner on the ambulance program.

== Recruitment and training ==
The first cohort of Freedom House Ambulance Service recruits consisted of 25 Black men recruited from The Hill District, a low income, predominantly Black neighborhood. At the time, local media referred to residents of the neighborhood as the "unemployables," and the recruits included men who had suffered long-term unemployment. Half of the recruits had not graduated high school. Some had criminal records, including felonies. The recruits also included veterans of the Vietnam War.

Dr. Safar designed and implemented the paramedics' training, a 32-week, 300-hour course that included anatomy, physiology, CPR, advanced first aid, nursing, how to defibrillate patients, and defensive driving. Their education was in hospitals as well as on the streets. Those who had not completed high school were helped in completing their GEDs.

Dr. Safar worked with Dr. Ron Stewart and Dr. Paul Paris to create a training curriculum that would soon shape paramedicine across the globe. Dr. Safar would soon meet a young and ambitious Dr. Nancy Caroline who while completing her medical schooling, would assist Safar, Stewart and Paris in compiling the new curriculum for Freedom House paramedics. This was Emergency Care in the Streets, and Caroline eventually became Freedom House's first medical director. Stewart and Paris were also in the process of attempting to create a place that people in the Pittsburgh region could come to study emergency medicine.

== Operation and legacy ==
The Freedom House Ambulance Service program began in 1967, and started officially operating in 1968 with two ambulances.

Prior to receiving their own ambulances, the Freedom House paramedics were pressed into service to help people injured during the King assassination riots in 1968, riding along with police on ambulance duty. The city contracted Freedom House Ambulance Service to handle emergency transportation in the downtown area and some predominantly Black neighborhoods.

They came to be known for the high standard of care they provided and were frequently requested by callers over the police. Freedom House Ambulance Service responded to almost 5,800 calls in their first year, and transported more than 4,600 patients, primarily in African-American neighborhoods in Pittsburgh. According to data collected by Dr. Safar, the paramedics saved 200 lives in their first year of operations. Where slow service to Black neighborhoods by the police had been a point of tension, the Freedom House paramedics had a response time of less than ten minutes in most neighborhoods.

In 1974, Dr. Nancy Caroline became the medical director of Freedom House upon being recruited by Dr. Safar. She arranged ongoing training for the paramedics in such unprecedented areas as intubation, cardiac care, and I.V. drug administration. The training Dr. Caroline provided would become the basis for the first paramedic curriculum, written by Caroline and adopted by the federal government in 1975. The data and studies conducted by Dr. Caroline shaped EMS practices for Magen David Adom.

The Freedom House paramedics' relationships with the communities they served also aided in their effectiveness. According to one documentary maker who chronicled their history:

Freedom House [paramedics] had compassion for the community .... They told me when you walk into a person’s home, you’re a guest. That’s the No.1 thing they brought to the table: They cared. They addressed everybody by their names. They respected them and asked permission before providing treatment.

During a deadly surge in heroin use, the paramedics were able to contact local drug dealers and provide information on identifying signs of an overdose. The paramedics also notified them that they would provide medical assistance in case of emergencies without legal repercussions for those who sold or used the drugs. This effort was followed by a dramatic drop in fatal overdoses in the city.

Freedom House Ambulance Service became a model across the U.S. and internationally, and was awarded a major grant to develop the first national standards for paramedics. Miami, Los Angeles, and Jacksonville would all follow the Freedom House model. Additionally, the ambulance model designed by Dr. Safar and proved through use by Freedom House paramedics was adopted by the National Highway Traffic Safety Administration as the official ambulance standard.

Despite these successes, the Freedom House paramedics faced racism from hospital staff and patients, as well as discrimination by the city government. The paramedics were sometimes assumed by hospital staff to be orderlies and were asked to mop the floor. White patients were often surprised by or resentful of Black paramedics, and would sometimes refuse to be touched or helped by them.

== Conflict with the mayor ==
Opponent of the Freedom House Ambulance Service, Peter F. Flaherty became Mayor in 1970. The mayor opposed public/private partnerships, believing services paid for by the city should be directly overseen by it. Phil Hallen of the Falk Fund stated that he believed racism was also a factor in Flaherty's opposition to the service. Op-eds printed at the time accused the mayor of trying to eliminate the ambulance service to pander to the police union. Dr. Safar echoed this view, stating "racial prejudices with white police officers eager to maintain control of ambulances city-wide" were the cause of efforts to end Freedom House's ambulance services in the city.

Freedom House Ambulance Service's request to expand their contract with the city to cover additional parts of the city was denied by the mayor, despite their strong record. This denied them the chance to serve more affluent neighborhoods in which they would likely have been more able to collect the fees they charged for ambulance service. During Flaherty's time as Mayor, the city began providing payment for the ambulance contract late, and cut its portion of the ambulance service's operating budget by 50%.

Flaherty also signed an ordinance barring the use of ambulance sirens in the downtown area, with noise complaints given as the reason. This slowed the paramedics when transporting patients to hospitals as well as their response time, allowing the police to reach more calls before them.

In 1974, the Mayor announced plans for a citywide ambulance system to be staffed by police officers trained as paramedics. Faced with resistance from city council member Eugene DePasquale, the mayor agreed to fund the Freedom House Ambulance Service contract for one more year. At the end of the year, the Mayor then announced the creation of a citywide ambulance service to be staffed by non-police paramedics and the end of the contract with Freedom House.

== Closure ==
The Freedom House Ambulance Service closed on October 15, 1975.

All of the paramedics initially hired to staff the new city ambulance service which succeeded it were white. Then the previous medical director of the Freedom House Ambulance Service, Dr. Nancy Caroline, accepted a position as medical director of the new city ambulance service on the conditions that the Freedom House paramedics and dispatchers also be hired and that Freedom House ambulance crews be kept together.

While the Freedom House paramedics were hired, their crews were broken up, in violation of the agreement. Those with criminal records were fired. Pass/fail exams were instituted, covering materials the Freedom House paramedics had not been taught, resulting in the dismissal of many. Most of those remaining were reassigned to non-medical or non-essential work. Many were placed in positions overseen by white employees with less experience. Of the 26 Freedom House employees who joined the city ambulance service, only half remained a year later. Ultimately, only five remained with the city ambulance service, and only one was promoted into a leadership position. In the late 1990s, 98% of the Pittsburgh Bureau of Emergency Medical Services were white.

== Media ==
There are two documentaries about the Freedom House. In January 2023, Pittsburgh local television station WQED released a documentary called, "Freedom House Ambulance: the FIRST Responders." The documentary, "Heroes On Call," began showing on February 4, 2025 by the streaming service Very Local, a subsidiary of Hearst Television broadcasting company.

In the television show The Pitt, a patient featured in season 1 episode 8 was a former Freedom House Ambulance medic. The show is set in the ER of the fictional Pittsburgh Trauma Medical Center. The patient, Willie Alexander, is an 81-year-old man with dementia whose pacemaker is discovered to be detached. Despite his dementia Alexander demonstrates some familiarity with medical terms. The audience later learns that Alexander has extensive medical knowledge from his time as a Freedom House Ambulance medic. The character of Dr. Robby, the attending physician in the show, describes the Freedom House medics as "the first paramedics in the country," and credits Freedom House with inspiring the modern 911 (emergency telephone number) system.

The movie Mother, Jugs & Speed humorously portrays the struggle of competing ambulance services before 911. The main characters compete against a Black-owned ambulance company and are forced to unite in the end. The title character starts as the radio dispatcher and becomes the first female Emergency medical technician.
