= Ranger Assessment and Selection Program =

U.S. Army Rangers selection and training course

75th Ranger Regiment insignia

Ranger Assessment and Selection Program (RASP) is an 8-week course held at Fort Benning, Georgia, for the U.S. Army's 75th Ranger Regiment. In 2009, RASP replaced both the Ranger Indoctrination Program (RIP) for enlisted Soldiers and Ranger Orientation Program for officers, both commissioned and noncommissioned.

RASP is designed to prepare soldiers, many of whom have just graduated Basic Training and Advanced Individual Training and are still considered "fresh" recruits, for assignment to the 75th Ranger Regiment. Soldiers from other units attempting to transfer to the 75th Ranger Regiment also attend the course, but are less common than new soldiers.

After completing RASP, Rangers must complete additional training for their role. This includes Airborne School, for those not already airborne-qualified, and training specific to their military occupational specialty (MOS). Ranger medics (MOS 68W), for example, attend training like the Special Operations Combat Medic (SOCM) course. Graduates are in jeopardy of losing all affiliation with the Ranger regiment if they fail to complete their follow-on training. Unsuccessful trainees will be reassigned to another unit.

== History ==
After 1st Ranger Battalion was reformed in 1974, selections were held directly by them. When 2nd Ranger Battalion was formed shortly thereafter, they began hosting their own selection as well. The RIP program was first started by three hand-selected NCOs in the 1st Battalion in 1975 while that Battalion was still located at Fort Stewart, Georgia. It was then adopted by the 2nd Battalion. In 1986, when the Regimental Headquarters was fully formed, a new consolidated RIP was started at Fort Benning, beginning in February 1985, where it was held until 2009 when it was changed to RASP.

In 2017 it was reported in Army Times that an unidentified woman was the first to pass the 21-day Ranger Assessment & Selection Program II (RASP II). This woman became the first to graduate from the selection program of a special operations unit. Previously in June 2016, a female noncommissioned officer had attempted to pass the test, but dropped out.

== Course ==
The training curriculum was specifically designed to "smoke" the trainees through endless punishment via constant physical training. In the second and fourth week of RASP, the class is sent to Cole Range; a remote training area of Fort Benning. It is designed to test the individual to their breaking point both physically and mentally; trainees sleep on average 4 hours total throughout Cole Range as they spend their nights doing tedious tasks such as the "hitting the wood line" for being incapable of meeting the given time standards. Although training such as patrolling and land navigation is taught at Cole Range, the main focus is to mentally and physically break down the individual. For classes held in the winter; it is not uncommon for 30–49% of the starting class to quit during the first night of Cole Range.

RASP is broken down into two levels of training: RASP 1 for junior noncommissioned officers and enlisted soldiers (pay grades E-1 through E-5) and RASP 2 for senior noncommissioned officers, officers and warrant officers. Candidates will train on physical fitness, marksmanship, small unit tactics, medical proficiency and mobility. Training is fast-paced and intense, ensuring Ranger candidates are prepared to employ their skills in both continued training and worldwide operations upon reaching their assigned Ranger unit. Throughout the course all candidates will be screened to ensure that only the best soldiers are chosen for service in the Ranger Regiment. Regardless of the course, all candidates must meet the course requirements in order to serve in the Ranger Regiment.

As of January 2010, the 4-week Ranger Indoctrination Program (RIP) became RASP (Ranger Assessment and Selection Program) and extended to 8 weeks long. There are two separate phases in the RASP program.

Phase 1 primarily consists of day-to-day, week-to-week physical and mental toughness training, and includes rigorous "smoke" sessions (blocks of time specifically geared toward using physical training as a tool for corrective training and instruction) that are used to train the group if a particular task, condition, or standard is not met, and also incorporate a necessary environment of the unknown to each soldier. Phase 2 training includes marksmanship and baseline breaching abilities. Ranger history is also the subject of training.

== Graduation ==
Upon successful completion of RASP, the new Rangers graduate at the Ranger Memorial, or in the event of inclement weather, Freedom Hall where they will don the tan Ranger beret and will have the scroll of the battalion they will be assigned to put on their shoulder.

== See also ==
- U.S. Army Rangers
- 75th Ranger Regiment
- Ranger School
- Parachutist Badge
- Marksmanship Badge
- Tabs of the United States Army
- U.S. Army Special Forces
- US Army Special Forces Assessment and Selection
