= 68W =

United States Army Military Occupational Specialty

68W (pronounced as sixty-eight whiskey using the NATO phonetic alphabet) is the Military Occupational Specialty (MOS) for the United States Army's Combat Medic. 68Ws are primarily responsible for providing emergency medical treatment at point of wounding on the battlefield, limited primary care, and health protection and evacuation from a point of injury or illness. 68Ws are certified as Emergency Medical Technicians (EMT) through the National Registry of Emergency Medical Technicians (NREMT). However, 68Ws often have a scope of practice much wider than that of civilian EMTs. This specialty is open to males and females with minimum line scores of 107 GT and 101 ST on the Armed Services Vocational Aptitude Battery (ASVAB).

== Description ==
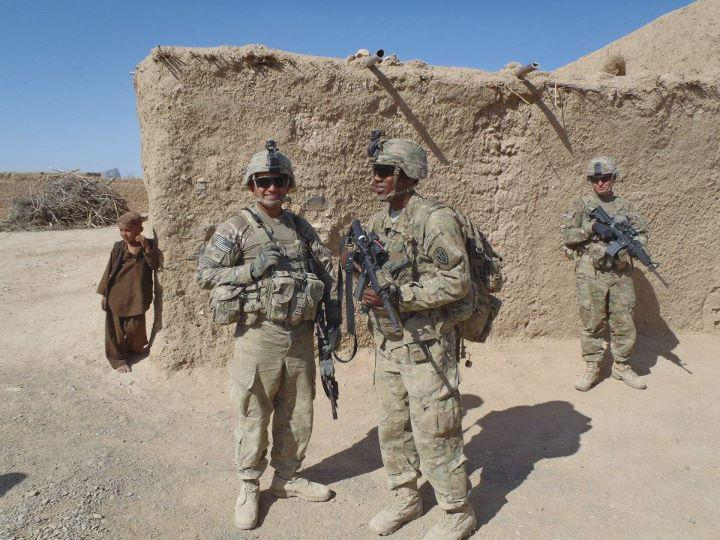
A U.S. Army 68W "Combat Medic Specialist" (center-left, viewers right) in Afghanistan. Note that the only distinguishing feature is the medical pack on his back.

Known administratively as "Combat Medic Specialist" (formerly "Health Care Specialist"), the primary role of combat medics in the U.S. Army is to provide medical treatment and, if necessary, combat casualty care to injured soldiers and their dependents. 68Ws serve as the first echelon of care, accompanying units as small as platoons and as large as battalions during training and deployments. 68Ws provide initial emergency medical care, medical evacuation, and supervision to other soldiers with medical training (such as those trained as Combat Lifesavers) as well as provide medical advice to the unit's chain of command. In addition to emergency medical support, 68Ws provide paraprofessional medical care in military medical treatment facilities to soldiers, military dependents, and authorized civilian personnel. In this capacity, 68Ws work under the supervision and purview of physician assistants and physicians, while working alongside other medical professionals.

68Ws are initially trained as Nationally Registered Emergency Medical Technicians (at the EMT-B level) with additional training in trauma and U.S. Army specific techniques and procedures. Maintenance of civilian accreditation is currently required, and further education is commonly offered, including the opportunity to add additional skill training through military and civilian education. Currently, only the U.S. Army requires their medics to maintain civilian accreditation in order to graduate from training and continue working as a 68W. Civilian equivalents are difficult to assess given the broad range of skills and training 68Ws may have but most, without additional specialized training, are trained in or work in areas overlapping civilian EMTs, medical assistants, patient administration personnel, office managers, schedulers, pharmacy technicians, phlebotomists, patient care assistants, and others. Senior 68Ws who have been promoted as non-commissioned officers generally assume more administrative duties in treatment facilities while training and supervising junior 68Ws.

== Skill Identifiers ==
Additional Skill Identifiers (ASI) are awarded to personnel with additional training in a particular specialty and affects what positions a soldier holding the skill identifier may be assigned to. These are tacked on to a 68W's MOS code. For example, a 68W trained as a Flight Paramedic would be known as a 68WF2. Majority of the previously used ASIs were changed to become entirely different MOS codes with their own specific training.

=== Currently used ASIs ===
- F2 is a U.S. Army Flight Paramedic.
- W1 is a 68W who completed the Special Operations Combat Medic course.
- Y8 is an Allergy and Immunology Specialist.
- P3 is a Nationally Registered Paramedic.
- 1P is a 68W who has completed the United States Army Airborne School E4 and below.
- 2P is a 68W who has completed the United States Army Airborne School for E5.
- 3P is a 68W who has completed the United States Army Airborne School for E6.
- 4P is a 68W who has completed the United States Army Airborne School for E7.

=== Previously used ASIs ===
- P1 is an Orthopedic Specialist. P1 is now Identified as MOS 68B.
- M6 is a Practical Nursing Specialist. M6 is now identified as MOS 68C.
- N9 is a Physical Therapy Specialist. N9 is now identified as MOS 68F.
- N3 is an Occupational Therapy Specialist. N3 is now identified as MOS 68L.
- Y6 is a Cardiovascular Specialist. Y6 is now identified as MOS 68N.
- P2 is an Ear, Nose and Throat (ENT) Specialist. P2 is now identified as MOS 68U.
- P3 is an Optometry Specialist. P3 is now identified as MOS 68Y.

== History ==
Currently known as 68W, the Army's basic medical MOS was changed, effective October 1, 2006. During the Vietnam War era, the MOS code was 91A.

The Department of the Army Deputy Chief of Staff for Personnel issued a notice for future change for the MOS 91B and 91C (Licensed Practical Nurse) in September 1999. The notice established the transition of personnel holding both MOSs to 91W to begin on 1 October 2001 and end on 30 September 2007. The 91W MOS required additional training and the maintenance of civilian EMT certification, which was previously optional for soldiers. U.S. Army personnel holding the MOS 91C would become 91Ws (and later 68Ws) with an additional skill identifier of M6. During the transitory period, all 91B and 91C classified soldiers were given the Y2 identifier until completion of additional training to become 91W, reclassification to a different MOS, or discharge from the U.S. Army.

The administrative title of 68W has also undergone minute changes. Previously known simply as the Combat Medic, it was changed to Health Care Specialist to assist soldiers in obtaining civilian equivalency when comparing skills learned in the U.S. Army to their civilian counterparts. It was changed into the more familiar Combat Medic Specialist to preserve the name and reputation that has already been established by the MOS. Colloquially, 68Ws are referred to as "Doc" when they have garnered the trust and confidence of the infantrymen they are assigned to take care of.

=== Medal of Honor Recipients ===
Notable Medal of Honor recipients who served as combat medics include Desmond Doss, Joseph G. LaPointe Jr., Lawrence Joel, Thomas W. Bennett, Gary M. Rose, Edgar Lee McWethy Jr., Clarence E. Sasser, and David B. Bleak.

== Training and assignment ==
After the completion of Basic Combat Training (BCT), soldiers training for the MOS 68W ship to Fort Sam Houston, Texas for Advanced Individual Training (AIT). Training typically lasts for 16 weeks and includes a combination of lectures and practical exercises conducted both in the field and the classroom. The first two months of the course focuses on Cardiopulmonary Resuscitation (CPR), Basic Life Support (BLS), and EMT skills and concludes with written and practical examinations. Prospective 68Ws must pass the NREMT certification exam (with a maximum of six attempts) in order to proceed into the U.S. Army specific course known as the "Whiskey Phase." Soldiers unable to pass the NREMT are reclassified into a different MOS according to the needs of the U.S. Army.

Whiskey Phase comprises the final two months of the 68W's training and consists of military emergency medicine, dismounted patrols, military operations in urban terrain (MOUT), and military-specific medical evacuation procedures. 68Ws are trained in additional medical skills that they are only authorized to perform in a military setting, as their EMT scope of practice more is limited. These additional skills are centralized on Tactical Combat Casualty Care (TCCC) guidelines and include emergency cricothyroidotomy, fluid resuscitation, medication administration (intraosseous, intravenous, and intramuscular), treatment of puncture wounds, treatment of arterial bleeding, and use of tourniquets for severe lacerations and/or amputations.

After assignment to a unit, 68Ws may, at the discretion of their unit's Physician Assistant (PA), learn any number of advanced skills. Topics are generally prescribed per each unit's functional role. For example, 68Ws assigned to an infantry unit (known colloquially as a line medic) may learn about advanced trauma treatments including venous cutdowns, placement of chest tubes, or use of special hemorrhage control methods. Oftentimes, the 68W is responsible for an entire platoon's medical readiness, which is reported to the senior medic or the company command team directly.

In the case of those attached to medical units, they may learn to administer medications which result in more definitive treatment than their civilian counterparts are allowed to. Brigade support battalions (BSB), in particular, can have an entire company staffed with 68Ws referred to as a "Charlie Med," as the Charlie Company is the definitive medical unit in this type of battalion. In line with the BSB's mission, the 68W's primary mission will fall under treatment and/or evacuation roles in order to support the brigade. 68Ws working in a BSB can also expect themselves to be trained in extensive vehicle maintenance as well as supply and logistics or be swapped to infantry companies within the brigade when 68Ws for that unit are lacking. In a combat support hospital or smaller medical treatment facility (such as the garrison clinic or battalion aid station), 68Ws can also be quickly cross trained in-patient administration, medical laboratory skills, and even medical logistics. Unlike civilian hospitals, combat support hospitals do not have a large number of 68C (Practical Nursing Specialist) and instead use the 68W who is readily available and partially trained. Some 68Ws can request additional training as paramedics. U.S. Army flight paramedics are trained in this manner upon successful submission of a packet, although slots are limited and the school can be highly competitive.

68Ws completing a minimum of 60 semester hours with required science prerequisites and shadowing hours may apply for the Interservice Physician Assistant Program (IPAP). The intensive two-year program results in a Master of Physician Assistant Studies degree from the University of Nebraska Medical College, an officer's commission to First Lieutenant, and the opportunity to sit for civilian certification.

68Ws also serve as a source for recruiting for special operations medics, such as MOS 18D (Special Forces Medical Sergeant), MOS 38BW4 (Civil Affairs Medical Sergeant), 160th Special Operations Aviation Regiment Flight Medic and 75th Ranger Regiment Ranger Medic. The former two require a complete MOS change alongside their training, while the latter two remain as 68Ws for the duration of their assignment. Those completing the assessment course for Special Forces, 160th SOAR, or the 75th Ranger Regiment are required to complete the Special Operations Combat Medic (SOCM) course (ASI W1), an intensive 10-month course located at Fort Bragg, North Carolina. Qualified medics are assigned to the direct support positions of these United States Army Special Operations Command (USASOC) assignments. SOCM medics work independently within specific protocols and the scope of practice may be expanded during the absence of a medical officer. SOCM medics assigned to special operations units regularly attend advanced medical and military training after the SOCM course to maintain interoperability with special operations forces.

=== Common workplace settings ===
68W's can often find themselves working in a multitude of different workplaces. Most units in the U.S. Army need medics, so they have a lot of options of where to go. 68W's will either find themselves working in a general practice clinic, hospital, or in the field.

Some units 68W's may be assigned to out of Advanced Individual Training (AIT) are:

- Armored Brigades - Brigades whose personnel specialize in tactics evolving armored vehicles including, but not limited to tanks and armored personnel carriers (APC's).
- Artillery Brigades - Brigades that specialize in the use of Artillery.
- Combat Aviation Brigades - Typically a unit composed of assets and personnel that support operations related to helicopters. 68W's will work in a Battalion Aid Station or a clinic on the ground. However, if they attend Flight Medic School, they will be assigned to these units as a Flight Medic.
- Infantry Brigades - Brigades typically composed of soldiers that maneuver on foot, in 4-wheeled vehicles, or jumping from aircraft.
- Medical Brigades - Brigades typically composed mostly of medical assets and personnel.
- Military Entrance Processing Stations - Locations where recruits are screened to enter military service.

This list is not all inclusive, as there are many different types of units in the U.S. Army.

=== Combat Lifesaver ===
A Combat Lifesaver (CLS) is non-68W soldier with minimal emergency medical training to provide care at the point of injury. It is a requirement that all Initial Entry Training soldiers complete the CLS (Combat Lifesaver) course and pass the CLS exam during Basic Combat Training. IET Soldiers who fail to complete the course or pass the exam are recycled to another class that is beginning the CLS Course. Combat Lifesaver skills are intended for use in combat; however, the skills may be applied to soldiers in non-combat situations. The Combat Lifesaver is instructed in various techniques to treat and stabilize injuries related to combat. The Combat Lifesaver doctrine was developed as an effort to increase survivability in combat environments where the combat medic may not be readily available. The Combat Lifesaver is a bridge between self-aid or buddy aid and the 68W. The Combat Lifesaver can augment the 68W, as needed.

== Recognition ==
Combat Medical Badge

Expert Field Medical Badge

68Ws may be awarded the Combat Medical Badge (CMB) and Expert Field Medical Badge (EFMB), if they meet qualification requirements. The CMB is awarded to medical personnel assigned or attached to, or under operational control of any ground combat arms or combat aviation units of brigade or smaller size, who satisfactorily perform medical duties while the unit is engaged in active ground combat, provided they are personally present and under fire. In contrast, the EFMB is awarded following successful completion of an intensive two week-long validation of field medical skills. Only one badge may be worn on their uniform at a time, although 68Ws are allowed to earn both.

== See also ==
- 68 Whiskey
- Combat Medical Technician (British Army & Royal Air Force)
- Enlisted Medic (U.S. Air Force)
- Hospital Corpsman (U.S. Navy)
- List of United States Army careers
- Army Medical Department (United States)
- Military medicine
- Battlefield medicine
- Medical Assistant (Royal Navy)
- Ambulance § Military use
