= Special Operations Combat Medic =

Military medical training course

Special Operations Combat Medic Course
- A student in the Special Operations Combat Medic Course at the U.S. Army John F. Kennedy Special Warfare Center and School checks an intravenous bag during field training at Fort Bragg, North Carolina March 24, 2020.
- Active: Late 1980s–present
- Country: United States
- Type: Military training
- Role: Initial training of special operations medics
- Garrison/HQ: Fort Bragg, North Carolina

The Special Operations Combat Medic (SOCM) course is the foundational medical training course for enlisted medics in the United States special operations community. It is taught at the Joint Special Operations Medical Training Center (JSOMTC) at Fort Bragg, North Carolina, an Army-run school with a Navy Special Warfare component. The course lasts about 36 weeks and takes students with little or no medical background through emergency medical technician (EMT) training, medical fundamentals, trauma care, and clinical rotations at civilian hospitals. Graduates are certified by the National Registry of Emergency Medical Technicians (NREMT) and serve in units such as Army Special Forces, the 75th Ranger Regiment, and Navy special warfare commands.

SOCM is the first half of the Army's 18D Special Forces Medical Sergeant pipeline, and graduates must periodically return to JSOMTC for sustainment training to keep the credential required to deploy as a special operations medic.

== History ==
=== Origins of special operations medical training ===
Before the creation of a joint school, medical training for Army Special Forces was done in stages. A medic attending the Special Forces Qualification Course in the early 1980s first completed the Army's 91B combat medic course (now 68W), then a first phase of medical training (course 300F1) at Fort Sam Houston, Texas, followed by hospital rotations and a "Med-lab" at Fort Bragg. In the mid-1980s, Med-lab training was temporarily halted over concerns about the procedures being taught and the lack of certification by recognized accrediting bodies; much of the training had been based on mission needs and instructor experience.

=== Consolidation at Fort Bragg ===
Preliminary talks on consolidating all enlisted special operations medical training at Fort Bragg took place in 1986. In 1991 the commander of USSOCOM sought funding for an institution to train all special operations health care providers, designated the U.S. Army Institute for Special Operations Medical Training; Congress allocated $17.5 million for its construction two years later. Construction was completed in May 1996 at a final cost of $27 million, and the facility was renamed the Joint Special Operations Medical Training Center.

=== A special operations credential ===
After the Gulf War, USSOCOM leaders questioned whether a standard civilian paramedic certification fit the work of special operations medics. In 2002 USSOCOM formally asked the NREMT to create a military certification category, and the NREMT declined. In April 2003 the USSOCOM Surgeon's office established a Department of Emergency Medical Services and Public Health, which created a Requirements Board and a Curriculum and Examination Board. The result was the Advanced Tactical Practitioner (ATP) certification, designed to certify the skills needed to care for a critically injured patient for up to 72 hours; a 2007 account says the ATP critical task list was derived from more than 1,445 medical tasks.

=== Navy component and later developments ===
The Naval Special Operations Medical Institute (NSOMI), the Navy detachment within JSOMTC, was established on 1 October 2006. Fort Bragg was renamed Fort Liberty in 2023, and in February 2025 the Army restored the Fort Bragg name, now honoring Pfc. Roland L. Bragg.

== Organization ==
JSOMTC is regulated by the Army's Training and Doctrine Command. According to Navy Medicine, it is the sole source of medical training for special operations medics under USSOCOM and the only center approved to grant the ATP credential, which must be renewed every two years through a sustainment course (SOCMSSC).

== Students ==
The target audience is Army and Navy enlisted service members who hold, or are designated for, a special operations medical position. Attendees include Army Special Forces (18D), Ranger and SOAR medics, civil affairs medics, and Navy SEAL, SWCC, and SARC medics.

== Curriculum ==
=== Structure ===
The course consists of seven blocks of instruction, each lasting 25 working days, progressing students from no medical background to performing acute life-saving interventions in 36 weeks; eight classes of 87 students are taught each year. The first phase is a five-week EMT course, and medical fundamentals include anatomy, physiology, pathophysiology, medical terminology, documentation, pharmacology, pharmaceutical calculations, and physical examination. Students also learn to treat diagnosed disease according to the Tactical Medical Emergency Protocols (TMEPs), written for remote environments where evacuation is delayed.

=== Certification ===
Graduates are certified as NREMT Basic-level EMTs and are qualified in basic life support, Pediatric Education for Pre-Hospital Providers, and advanced cardiac life support.

=== Changes in length ===
One Defense Media Network article described a 26-week course, and a 2012 university release described about nine months in total, including eight at Fort Bragg. Current course pages describe 36 weeks.

== Clinical training ==
VCU Medical Center said in 2012 that it was one of three civilian institutions in the program and had trained its 1,000th student. Capital Health Regional Medical Center provides rotations in the emergency department, trauma, surgical intensive care, the operating room, and anesthesia.

== Graduates and follow-on training ==
Army Special Forces 18D medics complete a second half of their pipeline, adding areas such as dive medicine. Active duty Navy corpsmen and selected reservists attend the Special Operations Independent Duty Corpsman (SOIDC) course after SOCM.

== See also ==
- Tactical combat casualty care
- Combat medic
- Naval Special Warfare Command
