= SABC (disambiguation) =

SABC is the South African Broadcasting Corporation, it can also refer to:

- Société Anonyme des Brasseries du Cameroun
- Self Aid Buddy Care Training (SABC), in the United States Air Force military training
- Shrewsbury and Atcham Borough Council, in the United Kingdom
- South Asian Bible College
