= Combat lifesaver course =

US Army medical training course

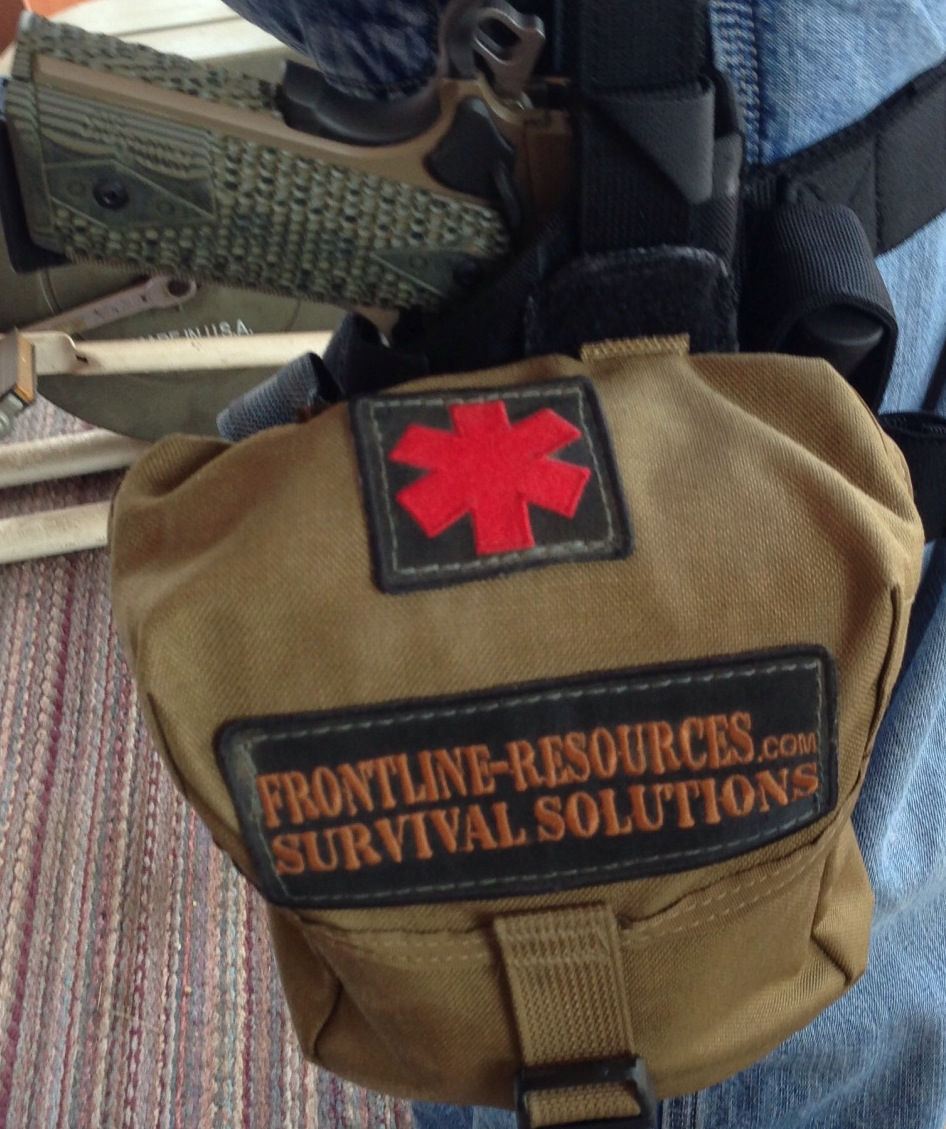
Individual Aid Kit

The U.S. Army Combat Lifesaver Course is an official medical training course conducted by the United States Army. The course is intended to provide an intermediate step between the buddy aid-style basic life support taught to every soldier and the advanced life support skills that are taught to US Army Combat medics and to US Army Special Forces medical sergeants ( MOS 68W and MOS 18D respectively).

== Course outline ==
- 40 hours theory & practical instruction
- 50 question written exam (pass/fail), 80% minimum score
- 20 minute practical exam (pass/fail), 100% minimum score

While a CLS certification is technically permanent, soldiers in Priority 1 units (actively-deploying brigade combat teams, for example) must retake the course once a year to retain their certification.

== Scope of curriculum ==
Aside from basic first aid, Combat Lifesavers are also taught to identify and perform the correct pre-hospital treatment for:

- Tension pneumothorax produced by a penetrating (bullet/frag) or non-penetrating (explosive barotrauma) lung injury
- Vascular hypovolemia produced by uncontrolled external hemorrhage
- External arterial hemorrhage (especially from an extremity)
- Destabilized spinal cord injuries
- Respiratory failure produced by a non patent airway in an unconscious or semi-conscious casualty

Combat Lifesavers are not, however, trained or permitted to perform (among other things) laryngoscopy, single lumen tracheal intubation or any kind of surgery (such as emergency cricothyrotomy)
