= Special Amphibious Reconnaissance Corpsman =

Hospital corpsman in the US Navy

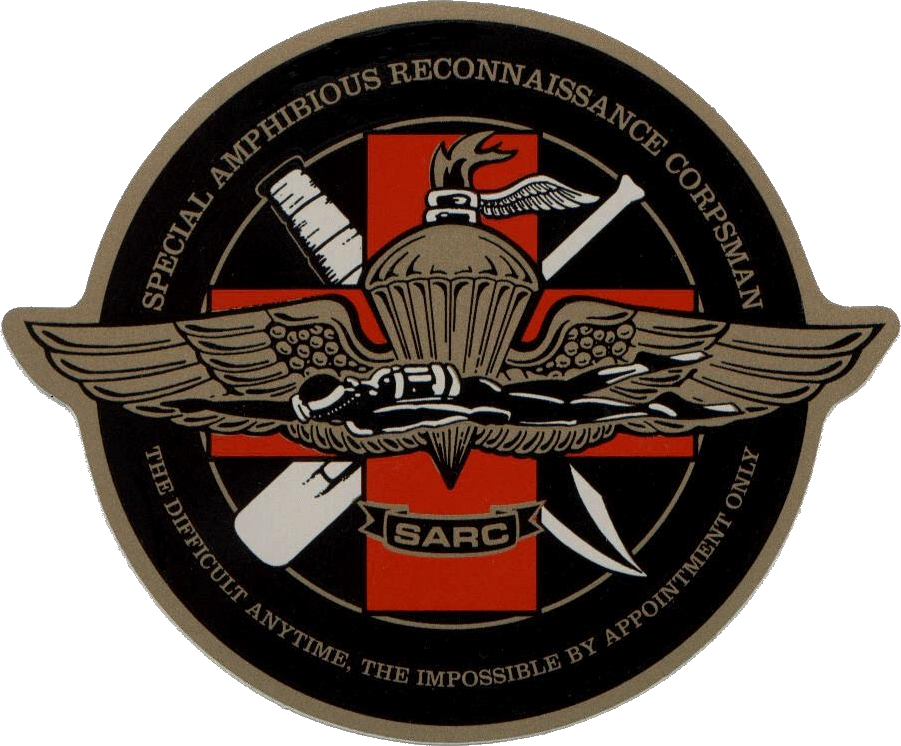
- Issued by: United States Navy
- Type: Special operations capable forces
- Abbreviation: SARC
- Specialty: Advanced trauma life support Air assault Amphibious reconnaissance Casualty evacuation CBRN defense Close-quarters battle Combat search and rescue Direct action Emergency medicine Irregular warfare Long-range penetration Maneuver warfare Medical evacuation Parachuting; Raiding; Reconnaissance; Special operations Special reconnaissance Tactical Combat Casualty Care; Tactical emergency medical services Tracking

A Special Amphibious Reconnaissance Corpsman (SARC) is a United States Navy hospital corpsman special operations capable who provides United States Marine Forces Special Operations Command (MARSOC) and other United States Special Operations Command (USSOCOM) units advanced trauma management associated with airborne (including military freefall parachuting), combatant diving, and heliborne. Traditionally, they are attached to the United States Marine Corps Force Reconnaissance (FORECON) companies to help support the Command Element of the Marine Air–Ground Task Force (MAGTF) in special reconnaissance missions.

== Mission ==
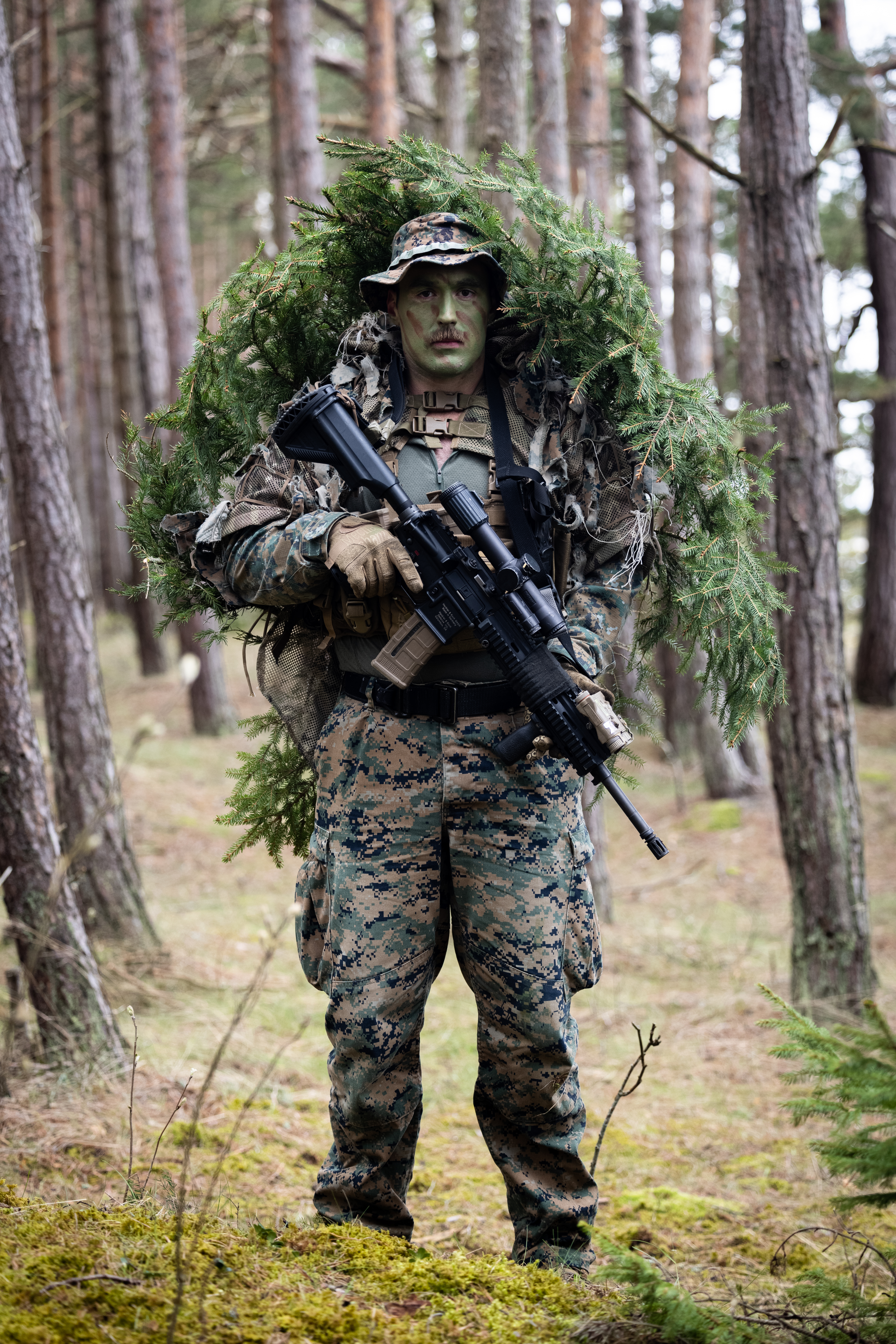
SARC independent duty corpsman with 2d Reconnaissance Battalion.

SARCs are trained and specialized in the same aspects of special operations as their counterparts: amphibious reconnaissance, casualty evacuation, CBRN defense, close-quarters battle, defusing and disposal of bombs and land mines, direct action, field military intelligence gathering, hand-to-hand combat, irregular warfare, marksmanship, military communications, SERE, special reconnaissance, tactical emergency medical, and tracking. They are also capable of conducting detailed underwater ship-bottom searches. During operational status, the teams will then be dispersed evenly throughout the United States Marine Corps Reconnaissance Battalions (Marine Division Reconnaissance) platoons; usually one SARC per platoon. SARCs have regularly acted as a marksman, point man, radio operator, or even the team leader in the Marine Recon teams/platoons. More recently, SARCs are being deployed with MARSOC and select United States Naval Special Warfare Command (USNSWC) units such as Naval Special Warfare Development Group (DEVGRU) due to their highly advanced skills in combat trauma care and diving medicine.

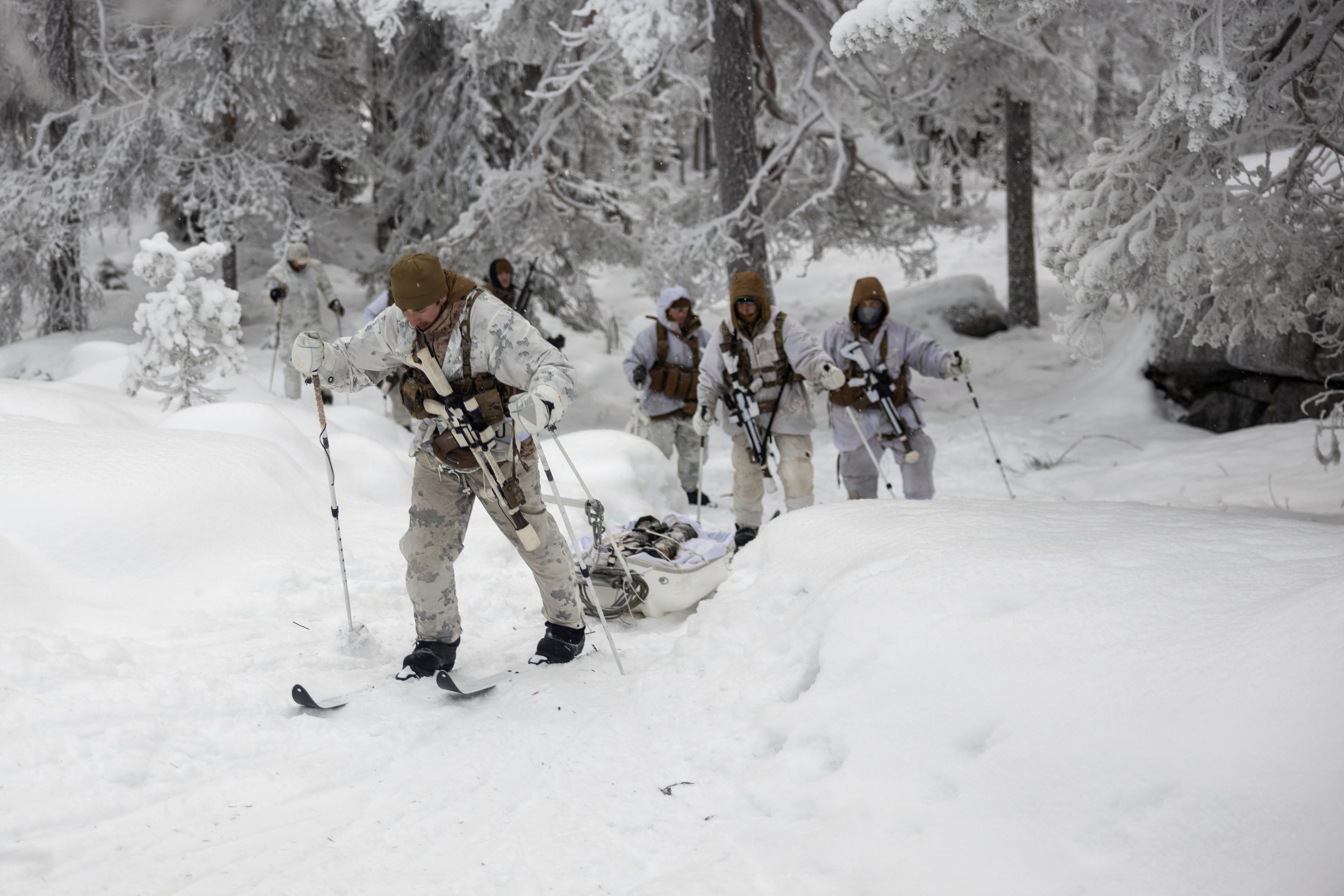
U.S. Navy special operations independent duty corpsman with 2nd Reconnaissance Battalion, 2nd Marine Division, pulls a pulk sled in Kalix, Sweden, Jan. 13, 2026.

The environments that Recon Marines and Recon Corpsmen face during a mission are usually hazardous. The Special Amphibious Reconnaissance Corpsmen use their paramedic skills to provide advanced medical support and other emergency medical procedures related to the hazards of swimming, open and closed circuit SCUBA diving, and military freefall during amphibious reconnaissance operations. They also instruct and advise the recon Marines in the prevention and treatment of illnesses, whether in combat or training.

The SARC has the duty of hyperbaric chamber operator: skilled in the operation of recompression chambers for hyperbaric treatment. They are also required to know laws and physics of diving, fundamentals of proper gas mixtures, theory and practice of decompression and the use of decompression tables.

- Performs routine sick call, diagnostic patient care as well as associated operational, administrative, and logistical duties.
- Performs basic anesthesia, minor surgical, basic clinical laboratory, basic radiology, and other routine and emergency health care procedures as required.
- Performs advanced trauma procedures in a hostile or combat environment often independently behind enemy lines.
- Instructs and advises junior medical and operational personnel in prevention and treatment of illness and injuries.
- *Recognizes all types of illnesses associated with diving to include oxygen toxicity and hypercapnia, nitrogen narcosis, type I and II decompression sickness and air/gas embolism.

== Screening and training ==
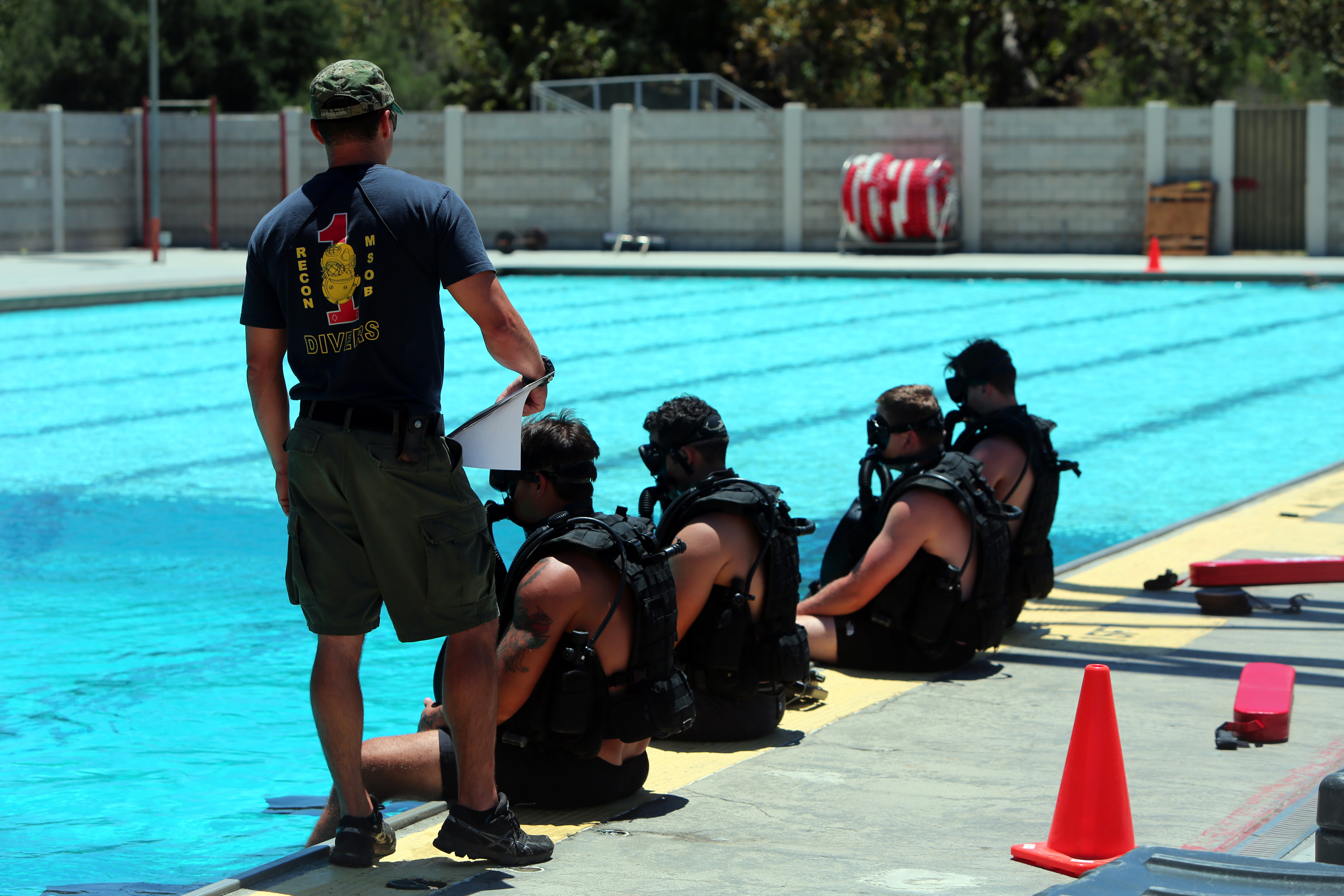
SARC’s Conduct Dive Training

As of 2016, a male or female hospital corpsman serving in the paygrades of E-1 (hospitalman recruit) to E-6 (petty officer first class) serving in any capacity may apply for candidacy. It is not required to be currently serving with a Fleet Marine unit to apply. Sailors currently attending Hospital Corpsman "A" School may enter the pipeline immediately without first serving time in the fleet by enrolling in the Special Operations Corpsman Program (SOCP), currently held at HM "A" School. This course is designed to prepare sailors for the lifestyle and training required of candidates applying for SARC, Dive Medical Technician (DMT), and Search-and-Rescue (SAR) programs. Candidates must have a current ASVAB general technical score of 100 or higher. They also must have passed their last three physical fitness assessments and be able to achieve a first class swim qualification. A commanding officer endorsement is also required, no non-judicial punishments for 12 months and no courts-martial for 24 months. The extensive training requires a commitment to serve as a recon corpsman for a minimum of three years.

=== Occupational Classification ===
After completion of Phases 1 & 2 listed below, Corpsman will be awarded the NEC L03A. Following Phases 3-9, Corpsman will be awarded the NEC L11A, Special Amphibious Reconnaissance Corpsmen (SARC).

1. Hospital Corpsman “A” School (75 days) - Fort Sam Houston, San Antonio, TX
2. Field Medical Training Battalion - West or East (59 days) - Camp Pendleton, CA or Camp Lejeune, NC
3. Reconnaissance Training Assessment Program (33 days) - Camp Pendleton, CA
4. Basic Reconnaissance (BRC) Course (95 days) - Camp Pendleton, CA
5. Survival Evasion Resistance Escape (SERE) School - (12 days) - Various Locations
6. U.S. Army Airborne School (21 days) - Fort Benning, GA
7. U.S. Marine Combatant Diver (MCD) course (51 days) - Panama City, FL
8. Amphibious Reconnaissance Course (ARC) course (37 days) - Panama City, FL
9. Special Operations Combat Medic (SOCM) course (250 days) - Fort Bragg, NC
10. Special Operations Independent Duty Corpsman (SOIDC) course (96 Days) - Fort Bragg, NC

=== Individual Specialty Training ===
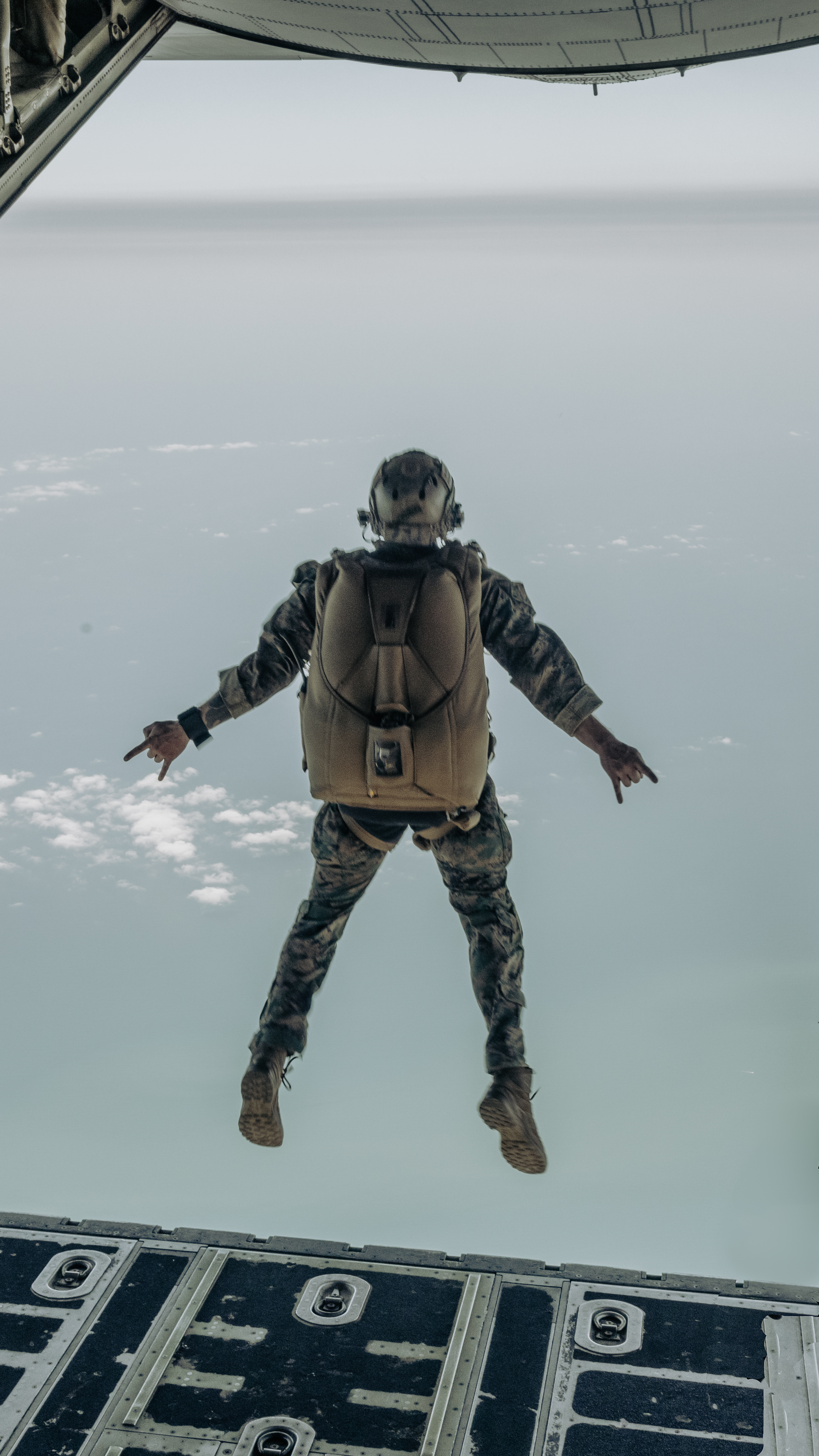
U.S. Navy Hospital Corpsman (SARC), with Task Force 61/2.5 (Force Reconnaissance Company), participates in a high-altitude parachute

Following this pipeline, the corpsman will be assigned to one of the Marine Corps Reconnaissance Battalions, Force Reconnaissance, MARSOC, or other USSOCOM command in order to be placed with a specific unit. Upon placement, corpsman will receive specialized occupational training in order to become a more qualified component of a team. SARC has many opportunities for schools in their training courses may include; HALO/HAHO military freefall parachuting, Advanced Air Operations: Jumpmaster or Parachute Rigger, Air Assault, Advanced radio communications, Diving Supervisor, Scout Sniper, Advanced Close Quarter Combat/Breacher School, CBRN defense, Language School, Naval Small Craft Instruction and Technical Training School, Surreptitious Entry, Unmanned Aerial Vehicle Operator, Advanced Driving Skills, Tactical Coxswain Course, Tactical Boat Crew Member Course, joint terminal attack controller, Ranger School, and Mountaineering.

SARCs can later gain the Special Operations Independent Duty Corpsman (NEC L02A) qualification. On completion of this advanced course, the Corpsman will be able to perform; Advanced Cardiac Life Support (ACLS), advanced paramedical skills, clinical diagnostics, basic surgical anesthesia, basic dental exams, and other routine and emergency medical health care procedures. Supervise and manage critical medical procedures in combat or non-combat environments. This course is similar to the US Army's (SFMS) Special Forces Medical Sergeant (18D) course.

=== Reserves ===
Reserve SARCs can be prior active duty SARCs/SOIDCs. L11A/LO2A NEC holding sailors can join the reserves and drill with 4th Reconnaissance Battalion as a SARC.

=== Joining reserves without prior service ===
Alternately, prior to or after joining the Navy reserves, an individual may complete a PST screener proctored by the 4th Reconnaissance Medical Inspector/Instructor. If passed, the individual can be transferred to 4th Recon for drill and begin the SARC pipeline. A promising candidate can be transferred to 4th Recon without having completed Hospital Corpsman "A" school and Field Medical Training Battalion (FMTB), but only on a case by case basis.

Link to more information and locations of Reserve Units: Special Amphibious Reconnaissance Corpsman (SARC)

=== Physical Screening Test ===
A Physical Screening Test (PST) will be performed in accordance with instruction MILPERSMAN 1220-410. Candidates must surpass the "SEAL PST Minimum Standards" as outlined below for consideration:

-500-yard (450 m) swim breast or side stroke: under 12 minutes 30 seconds

-Perform maximum push-ups (minimum: 50) in 2 minutes

-Perform maximum curl-ups (minimum: 50) in 2 minutes

-Perform maximum pull-ups (minimum: 10) in 2 minutes

-1.5 mile run: under 10 minutes 30 seconds

== See also ==
- Hospital corpsman
- United States Marine Air-Ground Task Force Reconnaissance
  - United States Marine Corps Force Reconnaissance
  - United States Marine Corps Reconnaissance Battalions
