= Ranger Memorial =

Tribute to US Army Rangers

Coordinates: 32°21′1.5″N 84°58′0.4″W

The Ranger Memorial is a tribute to the United States Army Rangers at Fort Benning), Georgia. The memorial serves as host to Ranger ceremonies such as Ranger retirement ceremonies to the graduation of the latest Rangers from the Ranger Assessment and Selection Program.

The original idea of the Ranger Memorial was drawn on a sketch by two Rangers in a mess hall. The idea was to form a permanent memorial to the contributions that Rangers have made to the defense of the United States and its allies throughout their long history. The construction was completed in 1994 with approximately 2,456 polished stones commemorating soldiers. In 1996, Phase II and 2,200 more memorial stones along with indirect lighting, sprinkler system, ledger stones, and a locater system for helping to find the Rangers on the walk.

The memorial is composed of a large Fairbairn–Sykes fighting knife sitting between two large marble pillars as the centerpiece. This knife was issued to British Commandos and subsequently to the men of the newly formed 1st Ranger Battalion while they were training with them in Achnacarry, Scotland. This knife later became a staple of the inventory of airborne troops as well as other special operations units during WWII.

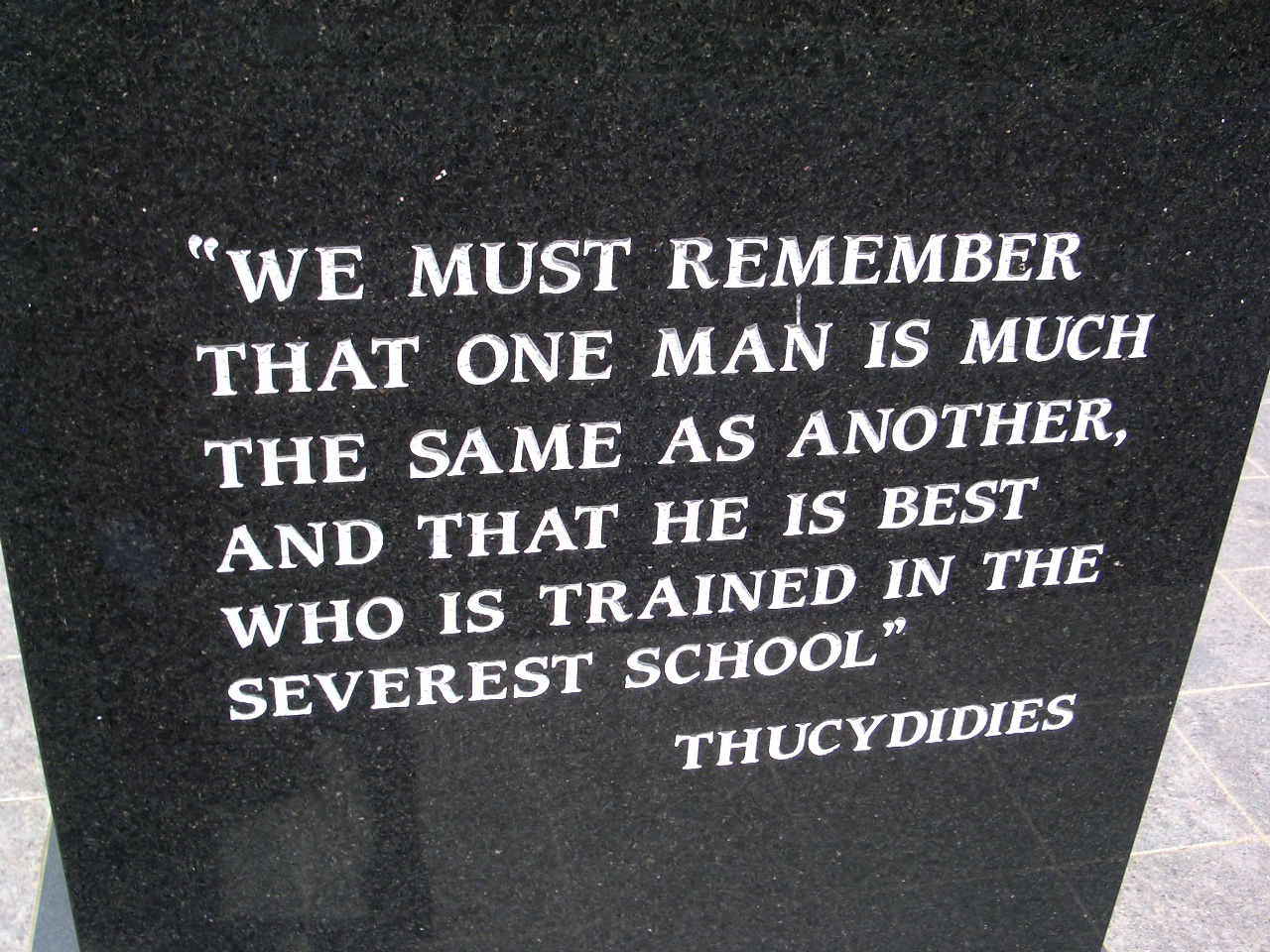
One of the black marble stones on the Ranger Memorial

Another unique part of this monument is the walkway to the centerpiece. It is composed of “purchased” stones by former and current Rangers with their unit information. No rank is indicated on the stones of the soldiers, only the word “Ranger” as the first line.

The criteria for stone purchase are very strict and not every person can be on the “Ranger Walk”. Anyone can buy a stone on the monument, but the stone has to be for a qualified Ranger.
