= Combat medic =

Military personnel who provide first aid and frontline trauma care

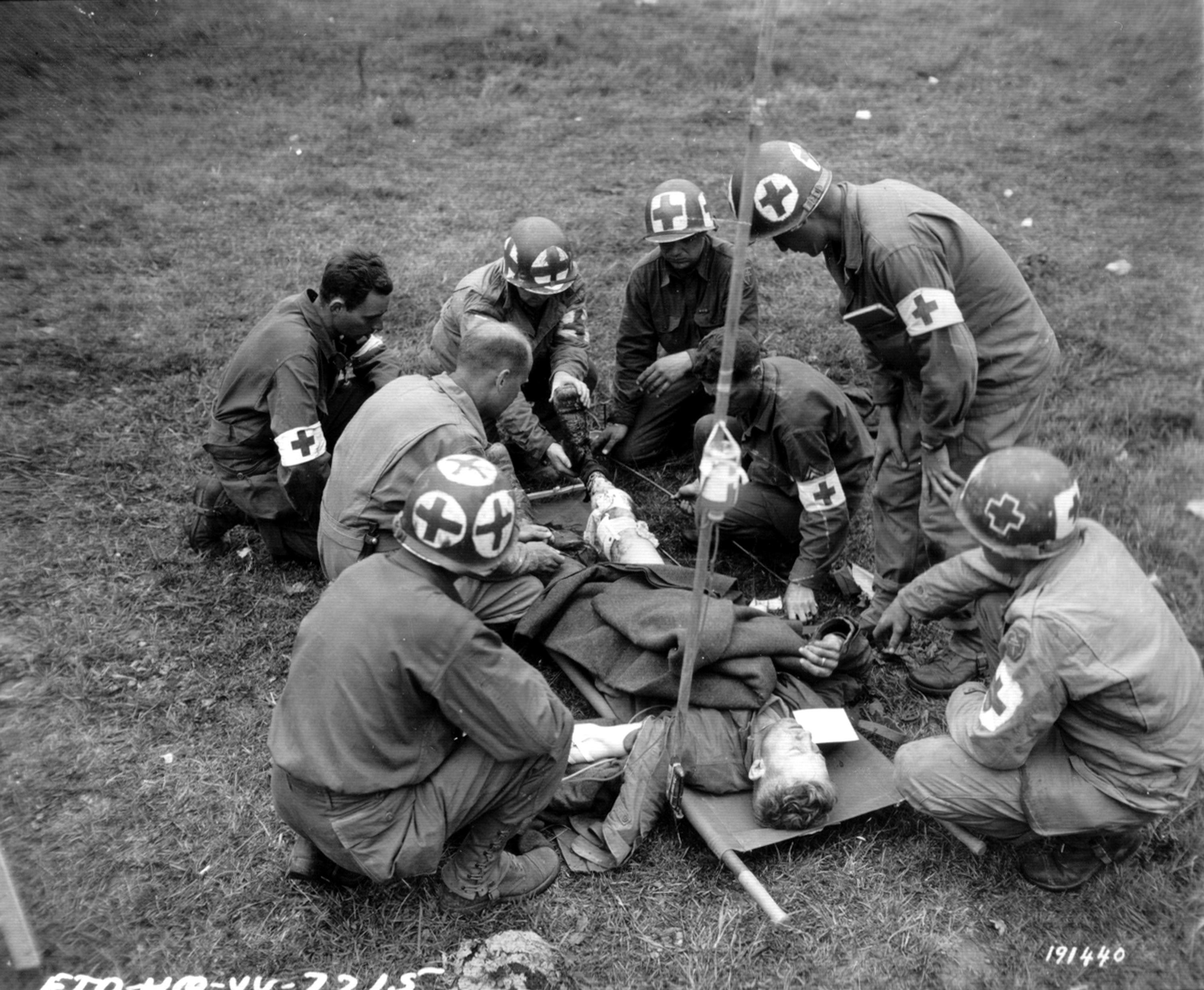
A U.S. Army Medical Corps team at work during the Battle of Normandy

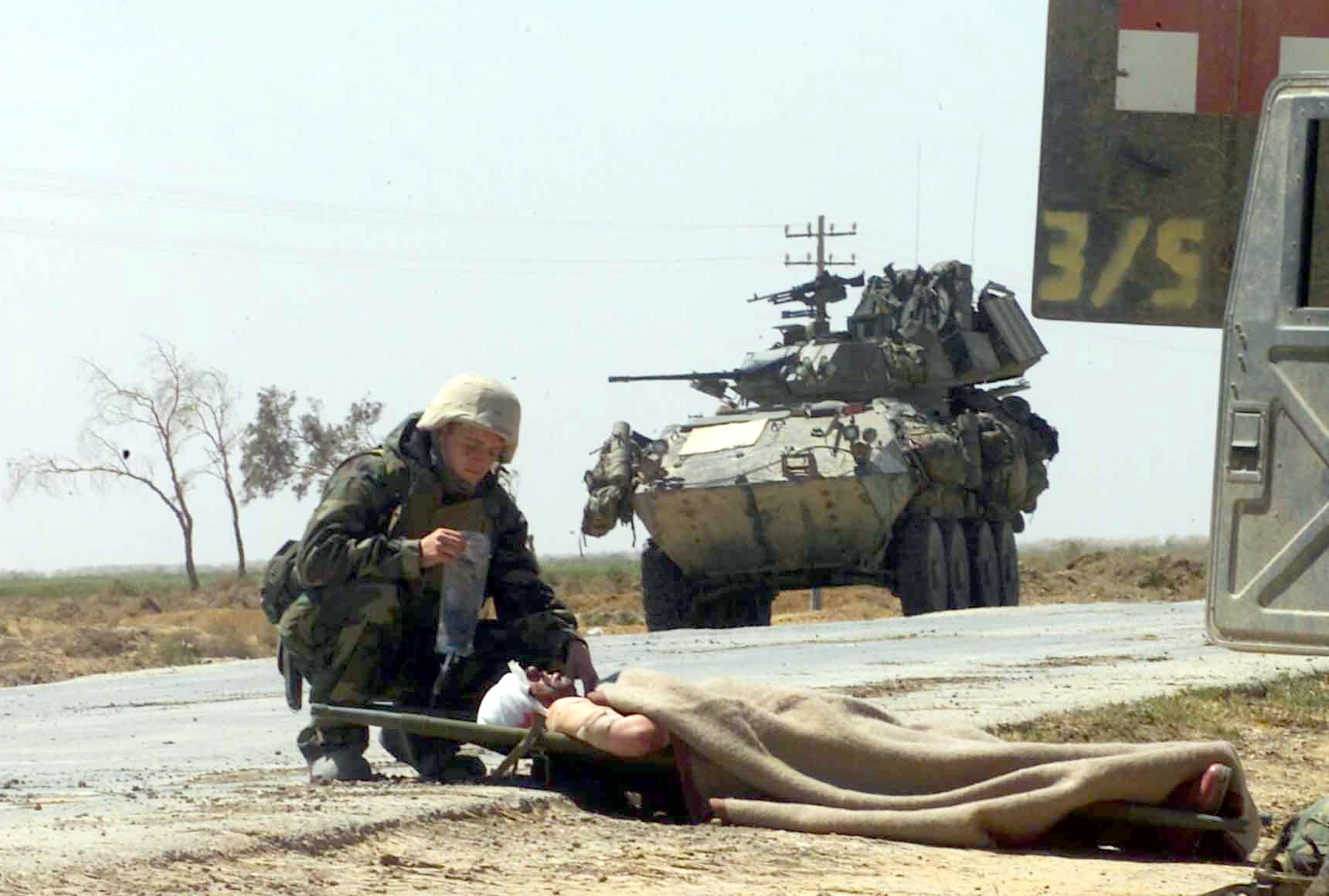
U.S. Navy Hospital Corpsman providing treatment to a wounded Iraqi soldier during the invasion of Iraq.

A combat medic is responsible for providing emergency medical treatment at a point of wounding in a combat or training environment, as well as primary care and health protection and evacuation from a point of injury or illness. Additionally, medics may also be responsible for the creation, oversight, and execution of long-term patient care plans in consultation with or in the absence of a readily available doctor or advanced practice provider. Combat medics may be used in hospitals and clinics, where they have the opportunity to work in additional roles, such as operating medical and laboratory equipment and performing and assisting with procedures.

== Canada ==
=== Training ===
All Regular Force Medical Technicians begin training with the Canadian Forces Leadership and Recruit School in Saint-Jean-sur-Richelieu, Quebec. Then they begin Occupational training at The Canadian Forces Health Services Training Centre in Borden, Ontario, where they are taught how to maintain medical supplies and equipment, screen patients, implement patient care plans, treat medical conditions, administer diagnostic procedures, medications, and continuous infusions. They also learn how to manage airways and assist with minor surgical procedures setting up deployed medical facilities and treating casualties in an operational and CBRNE environment over the course of 47-48 weeks. They also earn the Primary Care Paramedic Level 1 certification. Advanced training can include, Preventive Medicine, Biomedical electronics, and Aviation Physiology, among others.

=== Assignments ===
Medical Technicians may be posted to any Canadian ship, or base as part of the base emergency response or as part of a clinic or hospital. They can also be deployed as the medical detachment of an infantry platoon, as part of a MEDEVAC helicopter team, or on a naval vessel. It is customary for soldiers to refer to their platoon medic as "Doc", similar to the US tradition.

== United States ==
=== Training and certifications ===
All military medical training in the United States takes place at Joint Base San Antonio, Fort Sam Houston, Texas. Here, among other medical jobs, Army Combat Medics, Air Force Medical Technicians, and Navy Hospital Corpsman complete their respective medical training programs. While there are similarities in the training and skills, each branch also incorporates training specific to their services’ needs and mission.

Although Combat Medics are certified at the Emergency Medical Technician level upon graduation, their scope of practice often parallels and sometimes surpasses that of a paramedic. Their scope is expanded upon by the medical provider(s) assigned to the unit, who oversees the protocols and training of assigned medical personnel. Army medics follow a career progression sequence, wherein each rank above Specialist/Corporal (E4) comes with additional required knowledge, skills, and competencies.

Medics remain very versatile and may even diagnose illnesses and perform procedures usually performed by Physician Assistants, Nurse Practitioners, and Physicians. Combat Paramedic Course, Special Operations Combat Medic Course, Prolonged Field Care Course, Flight Medic/Critical Care Course, and advanced Tactical Combat Casualty Care (TCCC) such as cadaver labs are some of the educational opportunities available to medics as they progress, which include the use of goats as training aids due to their similarity to human physiology.

Although most of the training translates into civilian certifications/licenses, medics often train and practice on skills and with medications outside of their civilian counterparts' scope of practice. Many programs are dedicated to and provide preference for military medics transitioning into Paramedic, Registered Nurse (RN), and Physician Assistant (PA) educations.

=== Assignments ===
==== Hospitals and clinics ====
Medics may also be assigned to combat support hospital units, forward surgical teams, and military treatment facilities and clinics where they can fulfill almost any role, from administrative duties to laboratory and medical equipment operations.

==== Field units ====
When assigned to non-medical field units such as infantry, armored cavalry, artillery, combat engineers and military police, the personnel of the medical platoon are organic to the Headquarters and Headquarters Company/Detachment. The platoon is usually composed of three sections: Ambulance/Evac Section, Combat Medic/Line Medic Section, and the BAS/Treatment section. Each section is led by team leader, and the scope of practice all falls under the medical providers.

Ambulance/Evac medics function just like a civilian ambulance would. They are responsible for responding to and transporting patients from a point of injury to, as well as between medical care facilities.

The Battalion Aid Station (BAS)/Treatment Medics function similar to an urgent care/ small emergency department depending on size and resources. Under the direction of the medical provider and team leaders or sergeants, they intake, triage, and stabilize or treat patients for transfer to another tier or discharge. Battalion Aid Stations are more mobile than Combat Support Hospitals, but have less resources available. They are intended to move as the unit advances, whereas a Combat Support Hospital would have a more long-term fixed position.

Line medics are the most independent of the three. Although they belong to Headquarters, they are attached to other platoons within a company and oversee the medical care of the soldiers assigned to them which can be anywhere from 30 to 60 Soldiers. They become a part of the group they are assigned to and with the exception of a few tasks, they do everything that their assigned soldiers do from training to missions. They are the ones who would be the first to treat an injured person and direct their immediate medical care, and are often the first to recognize when something is wrong with one of their soldiers because they spend so much time with them. They may also be the subject matter expert in advising leaders of medical planning for missions. Their co-location with the troops they are assigned allows them to easily monitor ongoing health.

Being a line medic requires them to carry whatever a regular soldier carries, in addition to an aid bag and other medical supplies. These medics are required to be physically fit, and able to function well in stressful tactical situations. They are expected to be independent and function on their own as extensions of the provider. They make field diagnoses and manage the conditions appropriately, deferring to the provider when necessary.

In the U.S. armed forces, service members in line units often refer to their assigned combat medic or hospital corpsman as "Doc."

== Geneva Convention protection ==
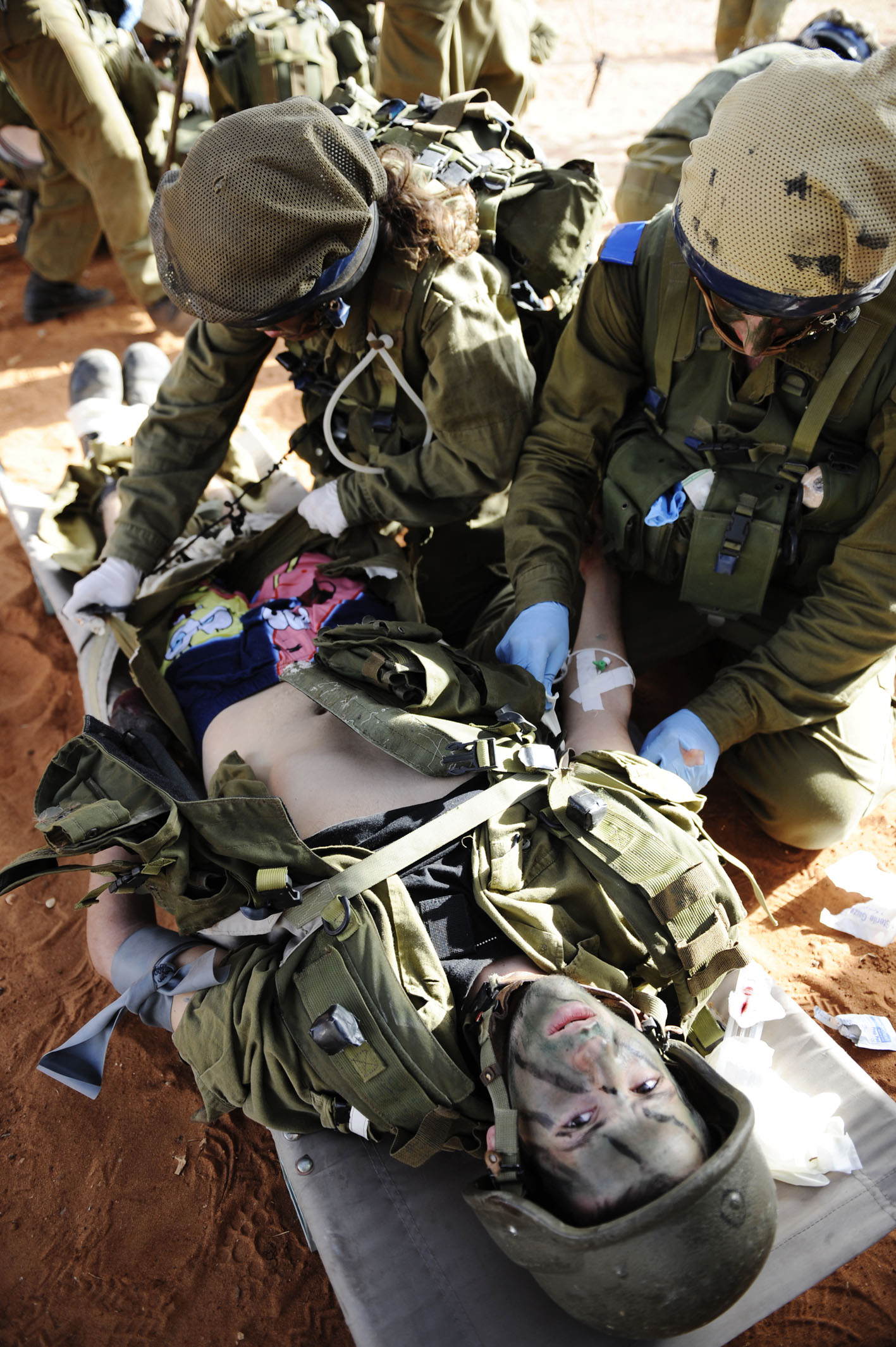
Israel Defense Forces field doctors training in Israel

In 1864, sixteen European states adopted the first-ever Geneva Convention to save lives and alleviate the suffering of wounded and sick persons in the battlefield, as well as to protect trained medical personnel as non-combatants, in the act of rendering aid.

Chapter IV, Article 25 of the Geneva Convention states that: "Members of the armed forces specially trained for employment, should the need arise, as hospital orderlies, nurses or auxiliary stretcher-bearers, in the search for or the collection, transport or treatment of the wounded and sick shall likewise be respected and protected if they are carrying out these duties at the time when they come into contact with the enemy or fall into his hands." Article 29 reads: "Members of the personnel designated in Article 25 who have fallen into the hands of the enemy, shall be prisoners of war, but shall be employed on their medical duties insofar as the need arises."

According to the Geneva Convention, knowingly firing at a medic wearing clear insignia is a war crime.

In modern times, most combat medics carry a personal weapon, to be used to protect themselves and the wounded or sick in their care. By convention this is limited to small arms (including rifles). During World War II, for example, Allied medics serving the European and Mediterranean areas usually carried the M1911A1 pistol while those serving the Pacific theater carried pistols or M1 carbines. The German medics (Sanitätssoldaten) in medical units were issued with the standard-issue Kar98K, while the infantry level stretcher-bearers (Krankenträger) and medical NCOs (Sanitätsunteroffiziere) were issued Luger or Walther pistols. When and if they use their arms offensively, they then sacrifice their protection under the Geneva Conventions. In today's combat environment, non-conventional forces frequently do not follow the Geneva Conventions, and deliberately target medical personnel identified by their equipment or insignia. Consequently, based on the tactical environment, medics in some armies carry a standard-issue rifle in addition to their pistol.

== History ==
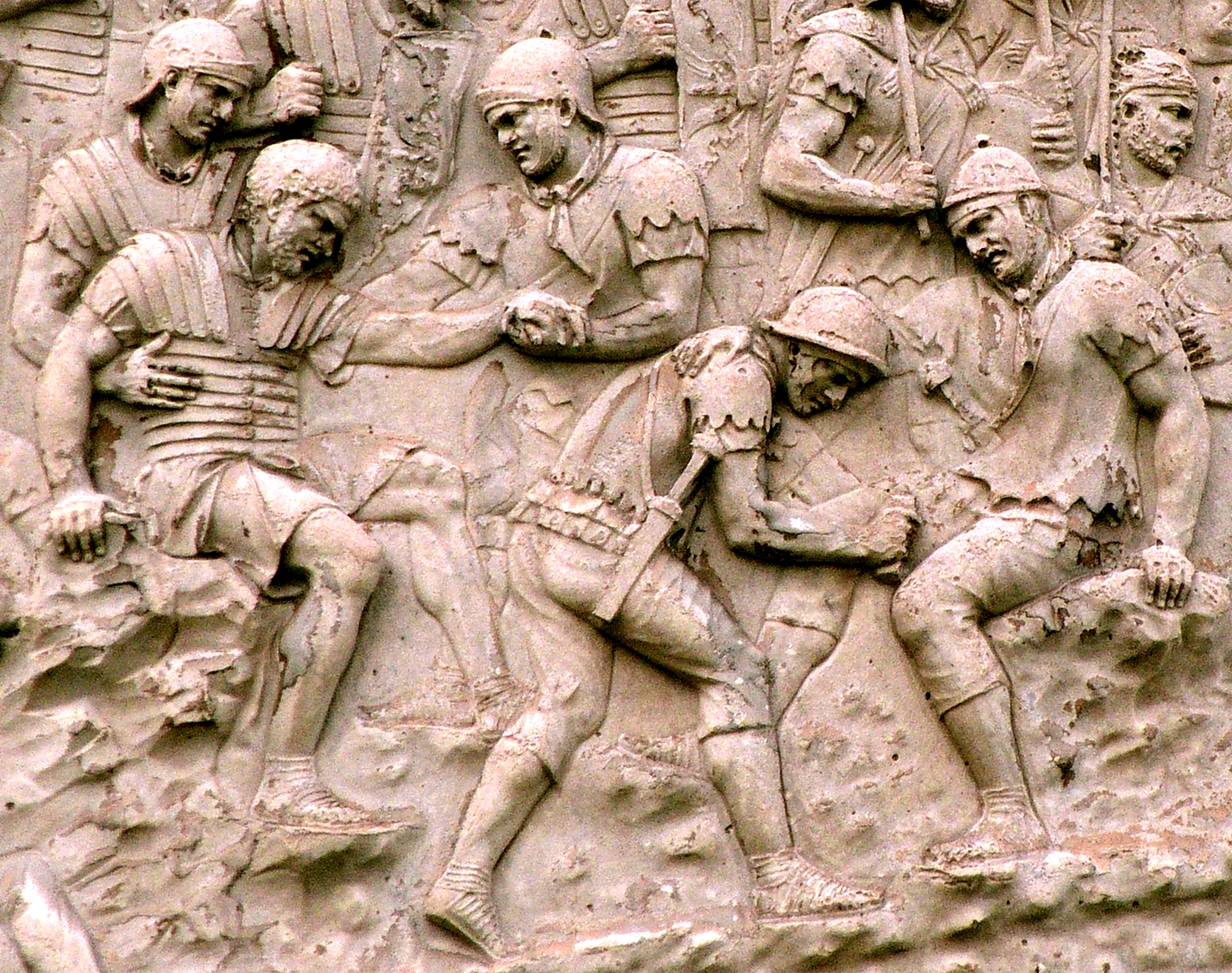
Capsarii depicted tending to injured soldiers on Trajan's Column

The Roman Army used combat medics which were referred to as Capsarii after the box (capsa) of bandages which they carried. Forts could also have hospitals integrated into their designs.

Surgeon Dominique Jean Larrey directed the Grande Armée of Napoleon to develop mobile field hospitals, or ambulances volantes ('flying ambulances'), in addition to a corps of trained and equipped soldiers (infirmiers tenues de service) to aid those on the battlefield. Before Larrey's initiative in the 1790s, wounded soldiers were either left amid the fighting until the combat ended or their comrades would carry them to the rear line.

During the American Civil War, musicians had the double duty of acting as stretcher-bearers to move the wounded to field hospitals and assisting surgeons operating on patients. However, the results of using musicians as medical assistants were uneven, and while some became adept in the role others were more hindrance than help. Surgeon (Major) Jonathan Letterman, Medical Director of the Army of the Potomac, realized a need for an integrated medical treatment and evacuation system, equipped with dedicated vehicles, organizations, facilities, and personnel. The Letterman plan for a dedicated ambulance corps was first implemented in September 1862 at the Battle of Antietam, Maryland, where it proved its worth. Soon the U.S. Ambulance Corps became an integral part of the Union Army. The Confederate States Army also implemented an ambulance corps, but it was plagued with shortages of men and supplies, making its job more difficult.

The United States Army's need for medical and scientific specialty officers to support combat operations resulted in the creation of two temporary components: the U.S. Army Ambulance Service, established on 23 June 1917, and the Sanitary Corps, established on 30 June 1917. Officers of the Sanitary Corps served in medical logistics, hospital administration, patient administration, resource management, x-ray, laboratory engineering, physical reconstruction, gas defense, and venereal disease control. They were dedicated members of the medical team that enabled American generals to concentrate on enemy threats rather than epidemic threats. On 4 August 1947, Congress created the Navy Medical Service Corps.

In the United States, a report entitled "Accidental Death and Disability: The Neglected Disease of Modern Society (1966)", was published by National Academy of Sciences and the National Research Council. Better known as "The White Paper" to emergency providers, it revealed that soldiers who were seriously wounded on the battlefields of Vietnam had a better survival rate than those individuals who were seriously injured in motor vehicle accidents on California freeways. Early research attributed these differences in outcome to a number of factors, including comprehensive trauma care, rapid transport to designated trauma facilities, and a new type of medical corpsman, one who was trained to perform certain critical advanced medical procedures such as fluid replacement and airway management, which allowed the victim to survive the journey to definitive care.

== Red Cross, Red Crescent, and Red Star of David ==
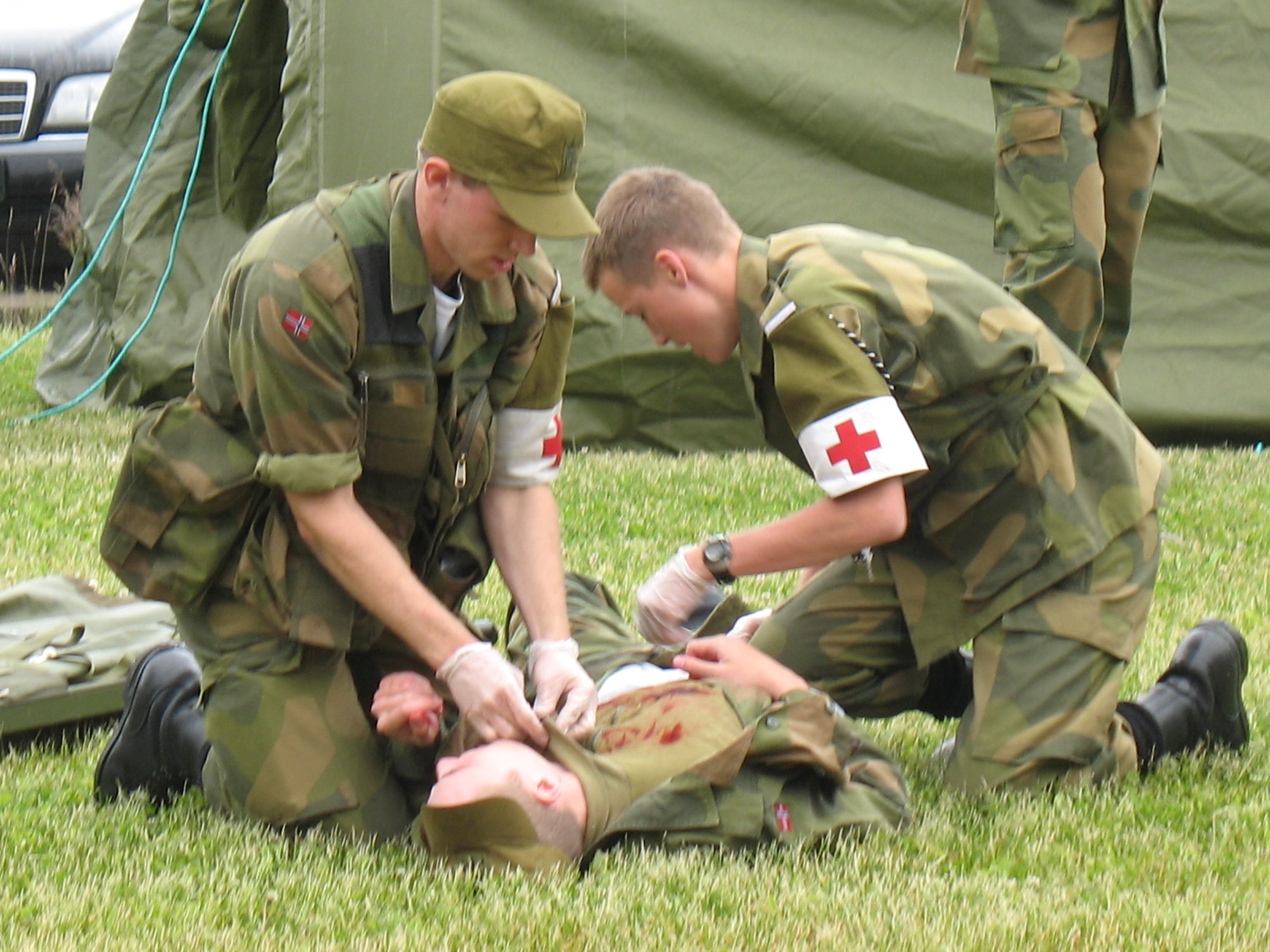
Norwegian Army medics wearing red cross armbands during an exercise in 2007

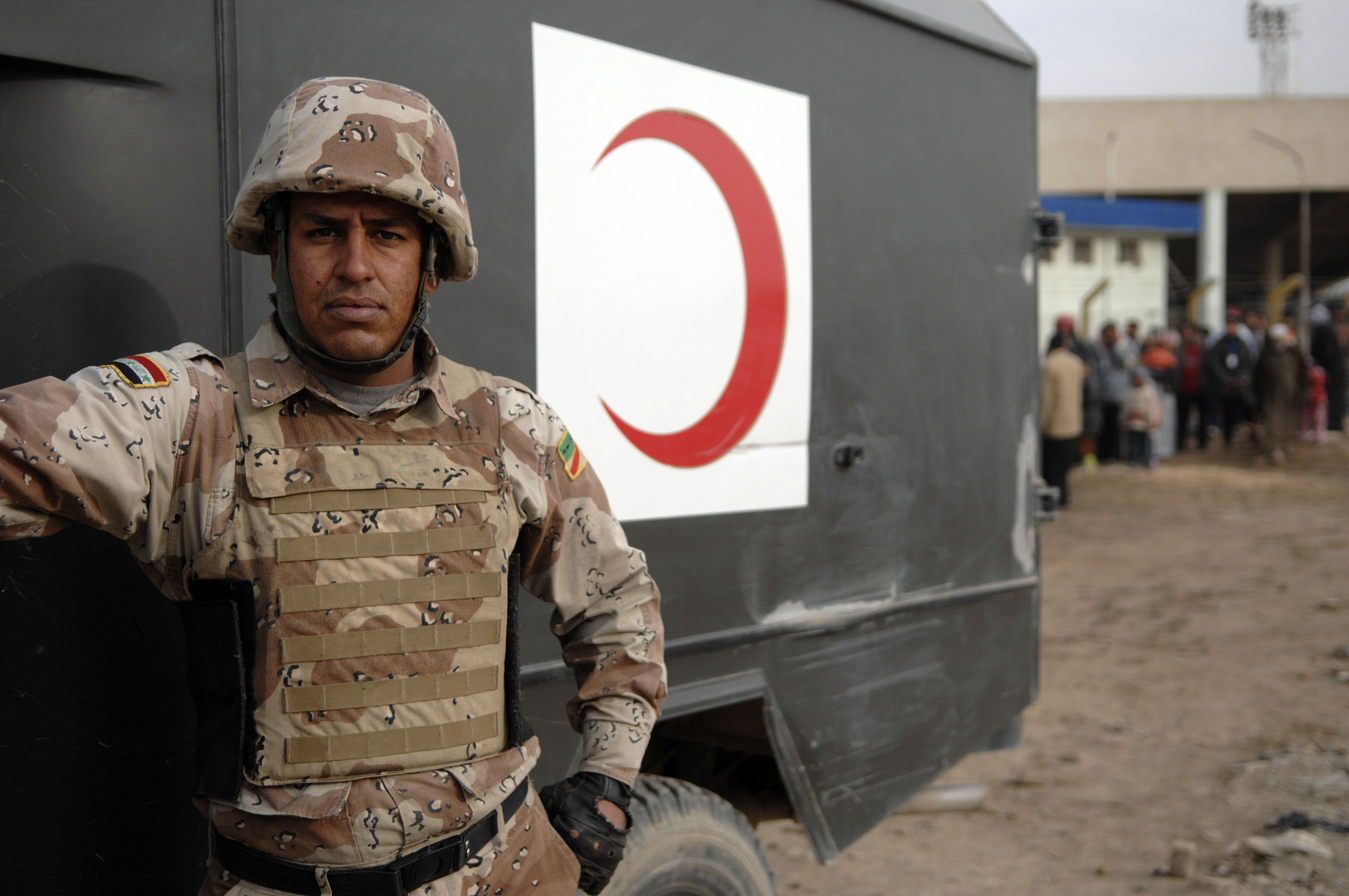
An Iraqi Ground Forces medic next to his military ambulance featuring a red crescent emblem

The International Committee of the Red Cross, a private humanitarian institution based in Switzerland, provided the first official symbol for medical personnel. The first Geneva Convention, originally called for "Amelioration of the Condition of the Wounded and Sick in Armed Forces in the Field", officially adopted the red cross on a field of white as the identifying emblem. This symbol was meant to signify to enemy combatants that the medic qualifies as a non-combatant, at least while providing medical care. Islamic countries use a Red Crescent instead, originating from the Russo-Turkish War, when the Ottoman Empire declared that it would use a red crescent instead of a red cross as its emblem, although it agreed to respect the red cross used by the opposing Russian Empire.

Although these symbols were officially sponsored by the International Federation of Red Cross and Red Crescent Societies, the Magen David Adom, Israel's emergency relief service, use the "Magen David", a red star of David on a white background. To enable the MDA to become a fully recognized and participating member of the International Red Cross and Red Crescent Movement, Protocol III was adopted, authorizing the use of the Red Crystal. For indicative use on foreign territory, any national society can incorporate its unique symbol into the Red Crystal. Under Protocol III, the MDA continues to employ the red Magen David for domestic use, and employs the Red Crystal on international relief missions.

== Modern day ==
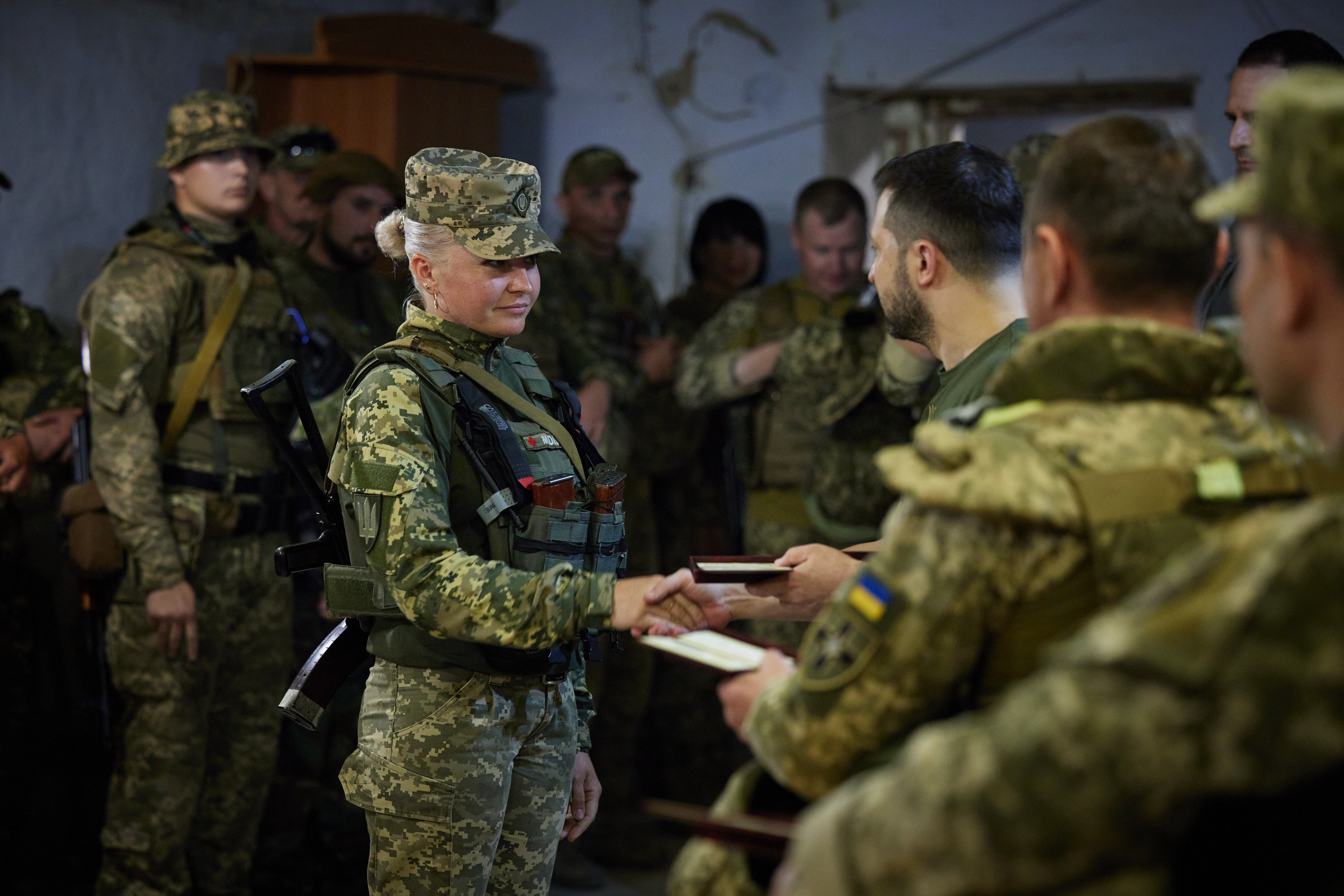
Ukrainian President Zelenskyy awarding a female combat medic in June 2022

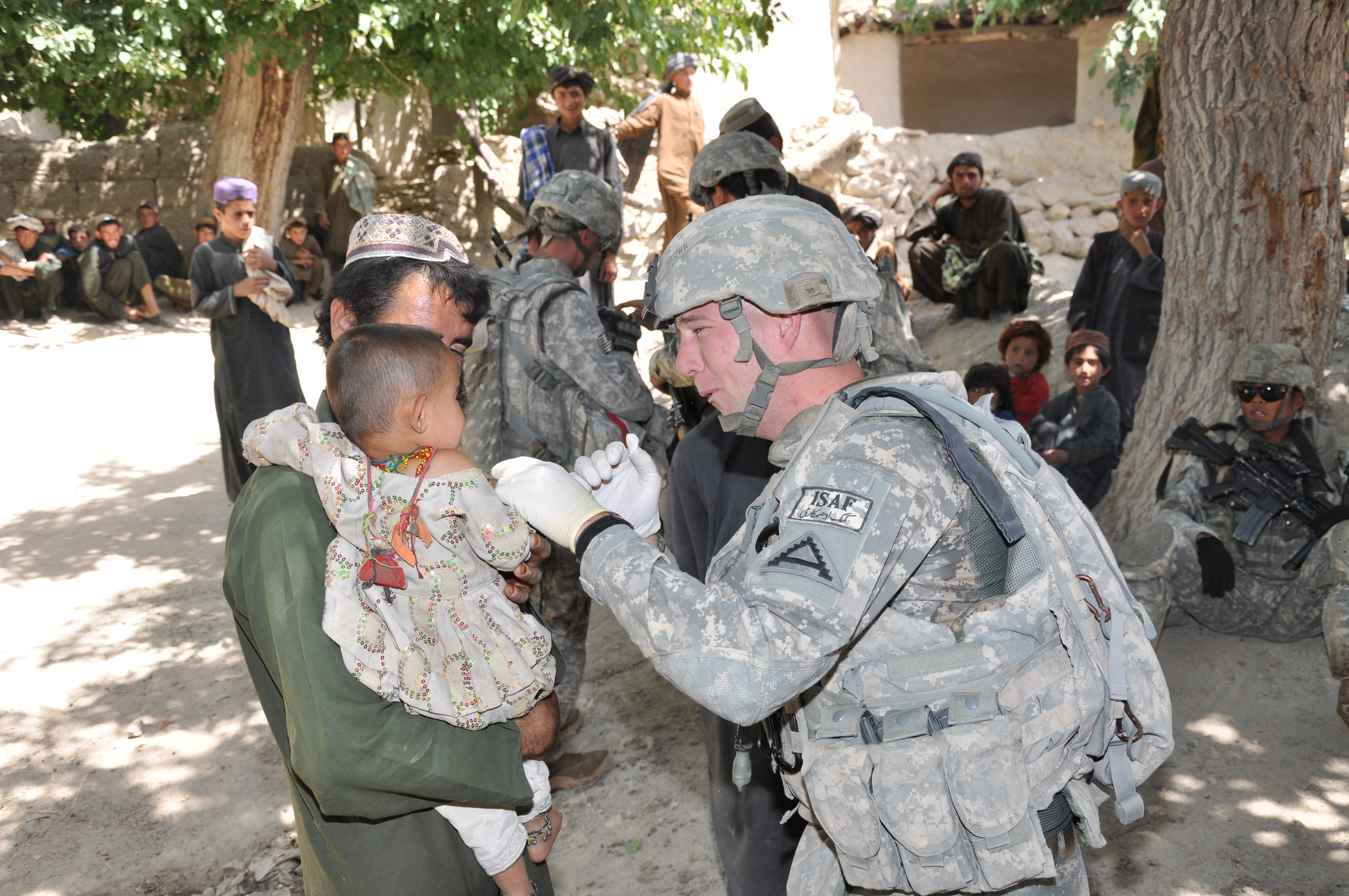
A U.S. Army combat medic examining a young child during the War in Afghanistan in 2009. Note that the medic lacks distinguishing features or medic insignia, to prevent targeting by insurgents.

Medical personnel from most Western nations carry weapons for protection of themselves and their patients but remain designated non-combatants, wearing the red cross, crescent or crystal.

=== United States ===
In the United States Armed Forces, MEDEVAC vehicles display a large Red Cross on a white background. However, ground forces do not display this due to increased targeting of medical personnel by insurgents.

Traditionally, most United States medical personnel also wore a distinguishing red cross, to denote their protection as non-combatants under the Geneva Convention. This practice continued into World War II. However, the enemies faced by professional armies in more recent conflicts are often insurgents who either do not recognize the Geneva Convention or choose not to adhere to it, and thus readily engage all personnel, irrespective of non-combatant status. As their non-combatant status is not respected, many US medics no longer wear non-combatant markings. This can enable medics to be used as medically trained soldiers, fighting aggressively rather than just in self-defence. Combat Medics in the United States Army and United States Navy Hospital Corpsmen are virtually indistinguishable from regular combat troops, except for the extra medical equipment they carry.

The modern-day interpretation of the U.S. Army doctrine requires medics to carry one primary weapon and, if possible, a secondary weapon. It is also common to find American combat medics who are no longer wearing the red or white cross because it is considered unethical to do so when the combat medic is carrying a weapon and could engage in actual combat.

As a result of the 2005 BRAC, the U.S. Department of Defense has moved most medical training for all branches of the armed forces to Fort Sam Houston of Joint Base San Antonio.

=== China ===
Before the 1979 Chinese invasion of Vietnam, the People's Liberation Army did not employ armoured ambulances, leading to difficulties in evacuation of casualties from the front lines. To fill this gap, the PLA first developed the WZ750 armored ambulance based on the Type-81 tracked armored command vehicle, and later on the WZ751 and WZ 753 vehicles. In addition to combat roles, PLA medics have been deployed to deal with the COVID-19 pandemic.

=== Germany ===
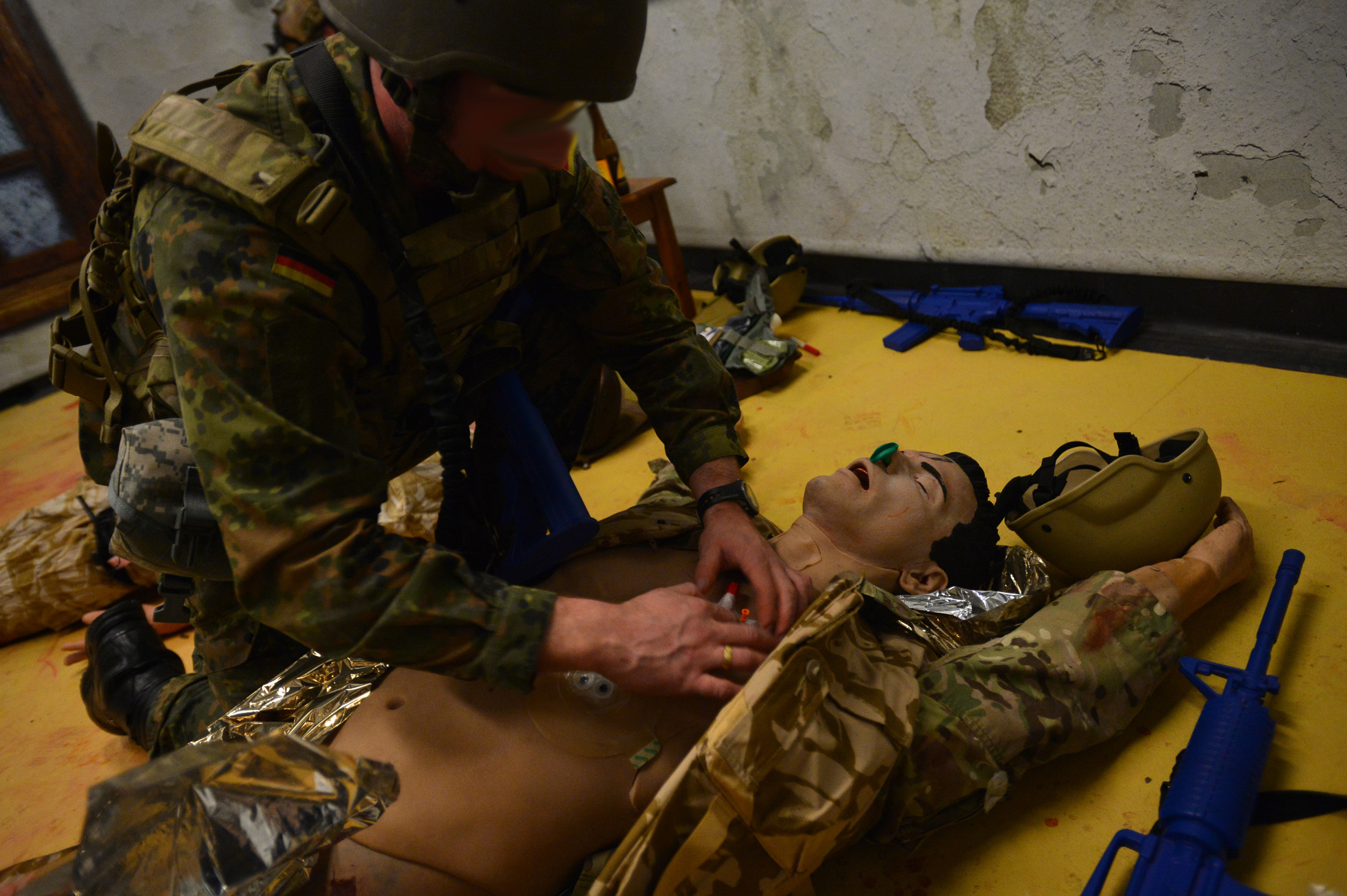
A German Army SOF medic attends to a mannequin with a chest wound at the ACME training facility in February 2014.

Following German rearmament in the 1950s, the medical service was reestablished based on the traditional structure, with a medical service for each military branch. This changed in 2002, when the medical services were largely merged to form the Joint Medical Service. Since 2002, most of the former responsibilities of the Army Medical Service have been transferred to the Joint Medical Service, although the entity still exists as a much smaller organisation within the German military.

== See also ==
- 68W – Healthcare Specialist (Combat Medic, U.S. Army) (Field Medic, U.S. Army).
- Ambulance – Military use
- Battlefield medicine
- Brain Trauma Foundation
- Combat Medical Technician – British Army Equivalent
- Combat support hospital
- Flight medic
- Medical assistant
- Medical evacuation
- Military medicine
- Polytrauma
- Royal Army Medical Corps
- Stretcher bearer
- United States Air Force Pararescue
- United States Navy Hospital Corpsman (U.S. Navy and Marine Corps)
- United States Navy Amphibious Reconnaissance Corpsman (U.S. Navy)
