= Self Aid Buddy Care Training =

Lifesaving training for companions

Self Aid Buddy Care (SABC) was a training of the United States Air Force (USAF). SABC encompasses basic life support and limb-saving techniques to help wounded or injured personnel survive in medical emergencies until medical help is available. SABC training is completed every 24 months (at a minimum) and is administered to Active Duty, Guard, and Reserve USAF (AF) personnel. USAF changed its SABC administration and training requirements in September 2018: since, active duty has a requirement to complete the training once every three years or when undergoing Personnel Change of Station (PCS).

SABC training consists of an online computer-based training (CBT) course and hands-on skill verification through SABC instruction in accordance with AFI-36-2238, and AFI 36-2218VI respectively. As of 1 June 2022, Tactical Combat Casualty Care has fully replaced SABC across the United States Department of Defense.

== Scope ==
The topics of SABC training encompass administrative overview, anatomy and physiology, communicable diseases/universal precautions, airway management, recognition and control of bleeding, shock management, dressings, bandaging, fractures, splinting, nerve agent/chemical environment, heat/cold related injuries, burn injuries, psychological injuries, victim assessment, triage, and patient transportation/litter movement. The course requires airforce personnel to complete the online Computer Based Training (CBT) Portion within 60 days before hands-on training can be completed.
