= Buddy aid =

US military term to describe first aid

Buddy Aid is a term used in the US military to describe first aid delivered by fellow troopers on the battlefield. It is basic first aid only, such as dressing wounds, stemming blood loss, splinting fractures, and possibly responding to nerve agents. The Iranian Military also utilizes the system. Urgent medical care can be vital for personnel in conflicts and wars, and many countries have similar practices.

== United States ==
Buddy Aid is a first-aid procedure for non-medical service members to help save other service personnel's lives. Medical personnel will instead use Enhanced First-Aid, which common personnel is not authorized to utilize. According to the US Defense Publication TC 4-02.1, Buddy Aid is only basic first-aid medical practice along with responding to nerve agents. According to LTC Slattery, service members should be trained to deal with dressing wounds, mitigating hemorrhages via tourniquets, adding splints to fractures, the movement, and care of injured personnel and maintaining the breathing of unresponsive troops.

== Iran ==
The Iranian military implemented Buddy Aid in its forces c. 2001, the goal of this is to ensure quick and rapid medical care to downed service personnel. They originally tested personnel via a written test and a hands-on test, to ensure that service members were competent when it came to saving other troops' lives.
