= Tactical Combat Casualty Care =

United States military guidelines for prehospital trauma care

TCCC logo.

Tactical Combat Casualty Care (TCCC or TC3), formerly known as Self Aid Buddy Care, is a set of guidelines for trauma life support in prehospital combat medicine published by the United States Defense Health Agency (DHA). They are designed to reduce preventable deaths while maintaining operational success. The TCCC guidelines are routinely updated and published by the Committee on Tactical Combat Casualty Care (CoTCCC), which is part of the Defense Committees on Trauma (DCoT) division of the DHA. TCCC was designed in the 1990s for the Special Operations Command medical community. Originally a joint Naval Special Warfare Command and Special Operations Medical Research & Development initiative, CoTCCC developed combat-appropriate and evidence-based trauma care based on injury patterns of previous conflicts. The original TCCC corpus was published in a Military Medicine supplement in 1996. TCCC has since become a Department of Defense (DoD) course, conducted by the National Association of Emergency Medical Technicians.

== Committee on Tactical Combat Casualty Care ==
The CoTCCC was originally established by the United States Special Operations Command in 2002 before moving to the Naval Medical Education & Training Command in 2004. The CoTCCC was moved again in 2007 as a standing subcommittee of the Defense Health Board (DHB). In 2012, the CoTCCC was once again moved to the domain of the JTS. In August 2018, the JTS along with CoTCCC were realigned as a directorate of the DHA. The CoTCCC now operates as a component of the DCoT. The CoTCCC has 42 voting members, who are specialized physicians, providers, and enlisted medical specialties from the United States Army, Navy, Air Force, Marine Corps, and Coast Guard. The TCCC Working Group is a larger group operating in conjunction with the CoTCCC consisting of non-voting members from throughout the DoD, US government agencies, civilian medical professionals, and partner nations.

== Trauma care guidelines ==
The TCCC guidelines are a set of evidence-based best practice guidelines for battlefield trauma care that have been developed over more than 18 years of war. Oversight of the TCCC guidelines is provided by the CoTCCC, which continually update them. Current guidelines are available online through the Deployed Medicine site, or through the Joint Trauma System site. They are also reproduced by the National Association of Emergency Medical Technicians websites, the Journal of Special Operations Medicine, and the Special Operations Medical Association.

== Objectives of the Tactical Combat Casualty Care guidelines ==
The three objectives of TCCC are to provide lifesaving care to the injured combatant, to limit the risk of further casualties, and to help the unit achieve mission success.

- Treat injured combatants
- Limit the risk of further casualties
- Achieve mission success

== Phases of care ==
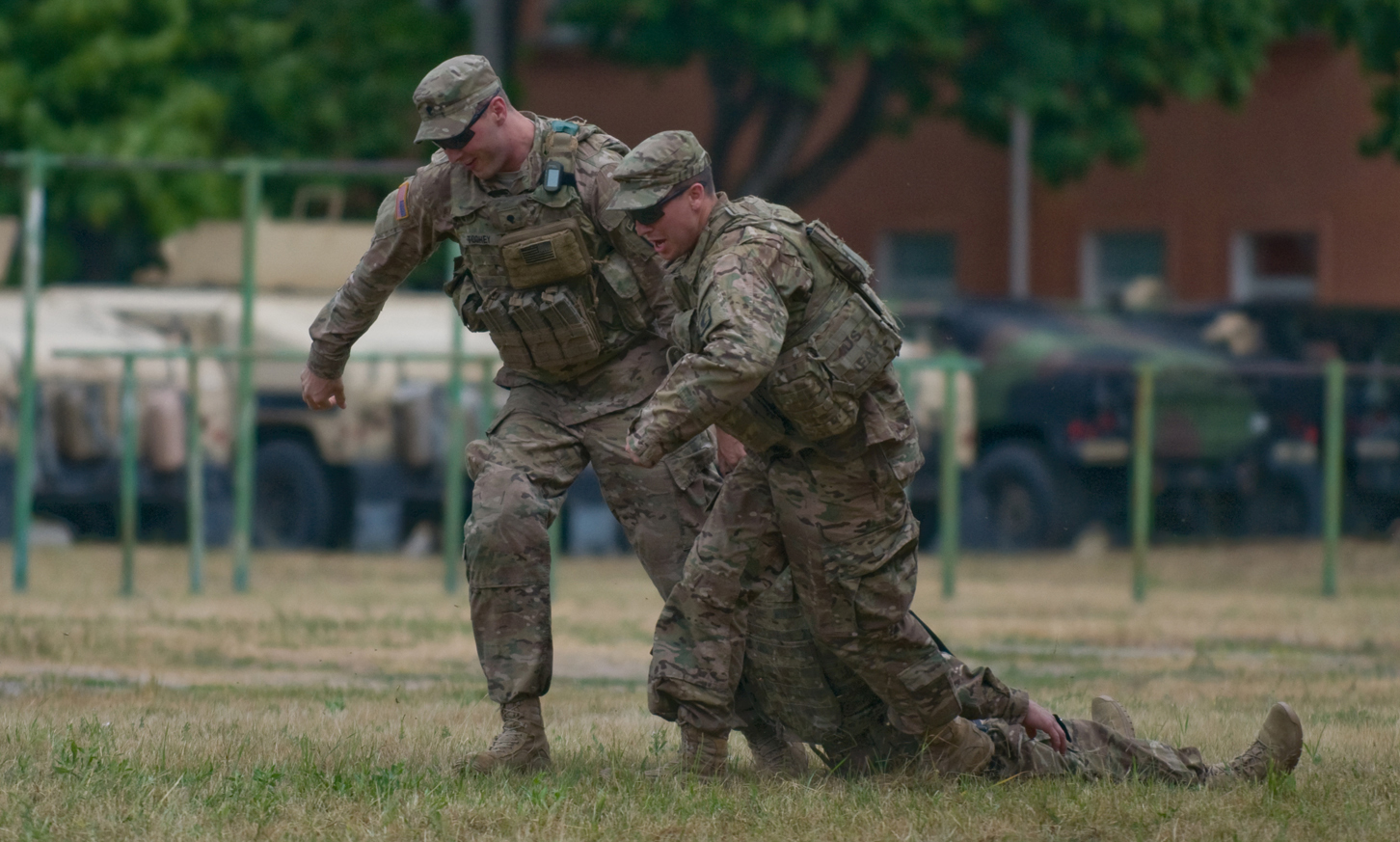
Care Under Fire training at Moody AFB, GA Feb 14 2018

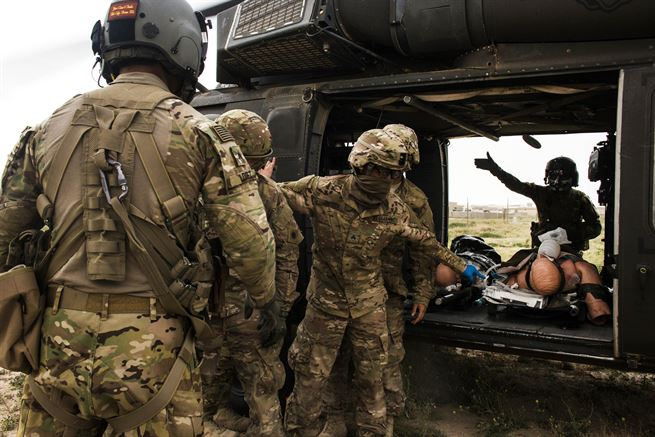
Tactical combat casualty care training at Camp Buehring, Kuwait, Feb. 23, 2016.

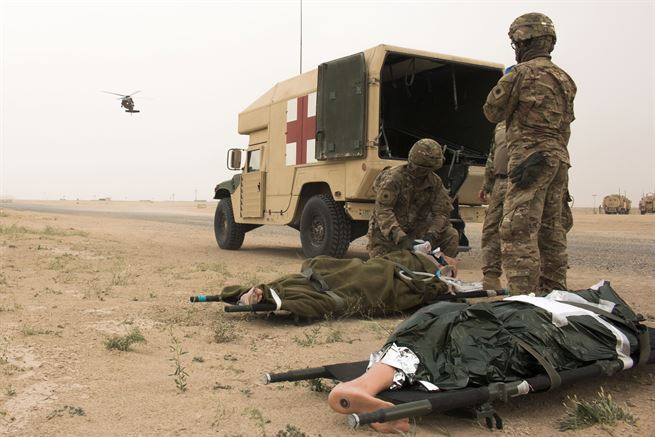
MEDEVAC at Tactical combat casualty care training, Camp Buehring, Kuwait, Feb. 23, 2016.

In TCCC prehospital battlefield care is divided into 3 phases:

=== Care Under Fire (CUF) ===
CUF is characterized as the care rendered to a casualty while still under effective fire. In this case, the first action is to return fire and take cover, and should include the casualty remaining engaged if able. As an enemy is suppressed, casualties can move or be moved to more secure positions. The only medical treatment rendered in CUF is stopping life-threatening hemorrhaging (bleeding). TCCC actively endorses and recommends the early and immediate use of tourniquets to control massive external hemorrhaging of limbs. All other treatment should be delayed until the casualty can be moved to a more secure and covered position and transitioned to tactical field care.

=== Tactical Field Care (TFC) ===
TFC is care rendered by first responders or prehospital medical personnel (primarily medics, corpsman, and pararescuemen) while still in the tactical environment. TFC is focused on assessment and management using the MARCH acronym.

- Massive hemorrhage is managed through the use of tourniquets, hemostatic dressings, junctional devices, and pressure dressings.
- The Airway is managed by rapid and aggressive opening of the airway to include cricothyroidotomy for difficult airways.
- Respirations and breathing is managed by the assessment for tension pneumothorax and aggressive use of needle decompression devices to relieve tension and improve breathing.
- Circulation impairment is assessed and managed through the initiation of intravenous access followed up by administration of tranexamic acid (TXA) if indicated, and a fluid resuscitation challenge using the principles of hypotensive resuscitation. TCCC promotes the early and far forward use of blood and blood products if available over the use colloids and discourages the administration of crystalloids such as normal saline (sodium chloride).
- Hypothermia prevention is an early and critical intervention to keep a traumatized casualty warm regardless of the operational environment.

Continued assessment and management in TFC includes treating penetrating eye trauma, assessing for traumatic brain injury or head injuries, treating burns, splinting fractures, and dressing non-life-threatening wounds. TCCC promotes the early and aggressive use of analgesia (pain management) on the battlefield through the administration of Ketamine and/or Oral Tranmuccossal Fentanyl for casualties with moderate to severe pain. TCCC also promotes the early administration of oral and intravenous or intramuscular antibiotics. The remainder of TFC is dedicated to reassessment of injuries and interventions, documentation of care, communicating with tactical leadership and evacuation assets. TFC culminates with packaging a casualty for evacuation and then evacuating by available air, ground, or maritime assets.

=== Tactical Evacuation Care (TACEVAC) ===
TACEVAC care encompasses the same assessment and management included in TFC with additional focus on advanced procedures that can be initiated when en route to a medical treatment facility. The caveat of TACEVAC is the evacuation means and care may or may not be dedicated medical platforms such as a MEDEVAC helicopter. TACEVAC can also include the evacuation of casualties on available non-medical assets and the provision of care in such circumstances, which is also referred to as CASEVAC or casualty evacuation. This is typically a non-medically designated vehicle.

== Supporting evidence on effectiveness ==
A significant amount of medical literature attests that TCCC is the most viable and reliable methodology to prepare for and manage casualties on the modern battlefield. Most battlefield casualties died of their injuries before ever reaching a surgeon. As most pre-medical treatment facility (pre-MTF) deaths are nonsurvivable, mitigation strategies to impact outcomes in this population need to be directed toward injury prevention. To significantly impact the outcome of combat casualties with potentially survivable (PS) injury, strategies must be developed to mitigate hemorrhage and optimize airway management or reduce the time interval between the battlefield point of injury and surgical intervention. A command-directed casualty response system that trains ALL personnel in Tactical Combat Casualty Care resulted in unprecedented reduction of killed-in-action deaths, casualties who died of wounds, and preventable combat death. There are key components of a prehospital casualty response system, emphasize the importance of leadership, underscore the synergy achieved through collaboration between medical and nonmedical leaders, and provide an example to other organizations and communities striving to achieve success in trauma as measured through improved casualty survival. The success of the medical improvements during the wars in Iraq and Afghanistan have served to maintain the lowest case fatality rate on record.

== See also ==
- Blast injury
- Fentanyl
