= List of California fire departments =

This is a list of fire departments in the U.S. state of California.

== California fire departments ==
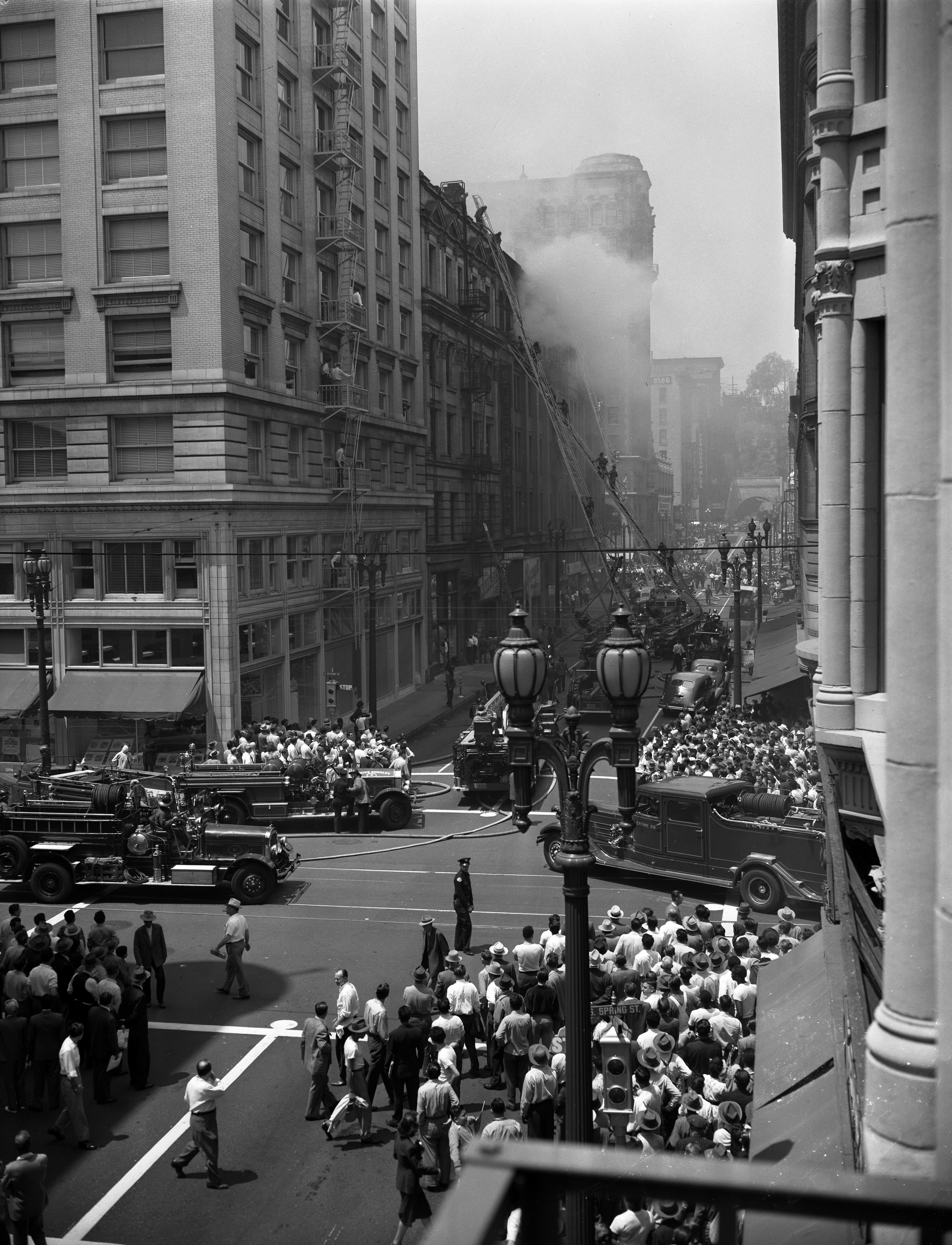
The Los Angeles Fire Department on the scene of a fire in the Bradbury Building, Downtown Los Angeles in 1947

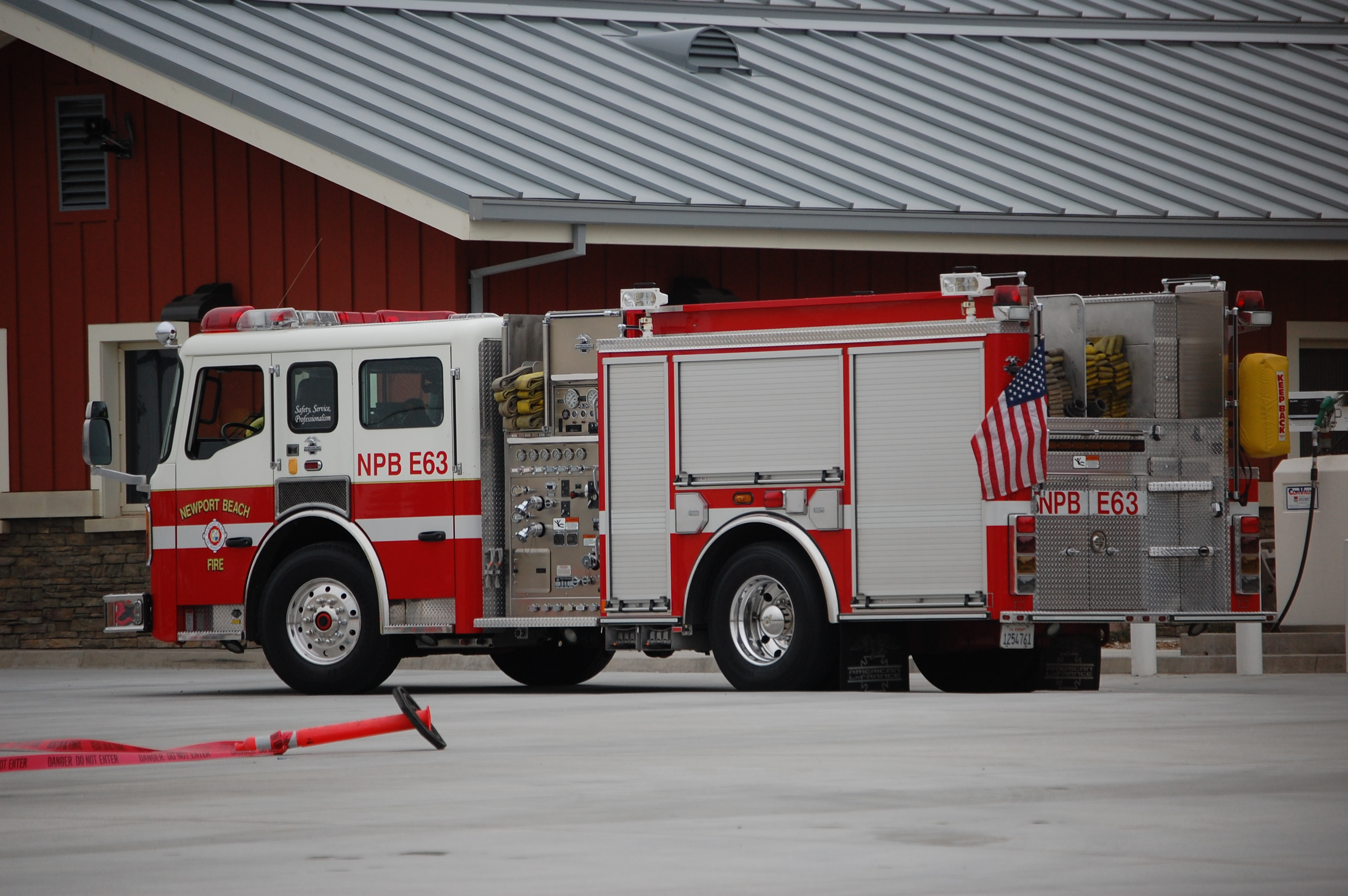
The Newport Beach Fire Department's Engine 63 at the training facility in Newport Beach

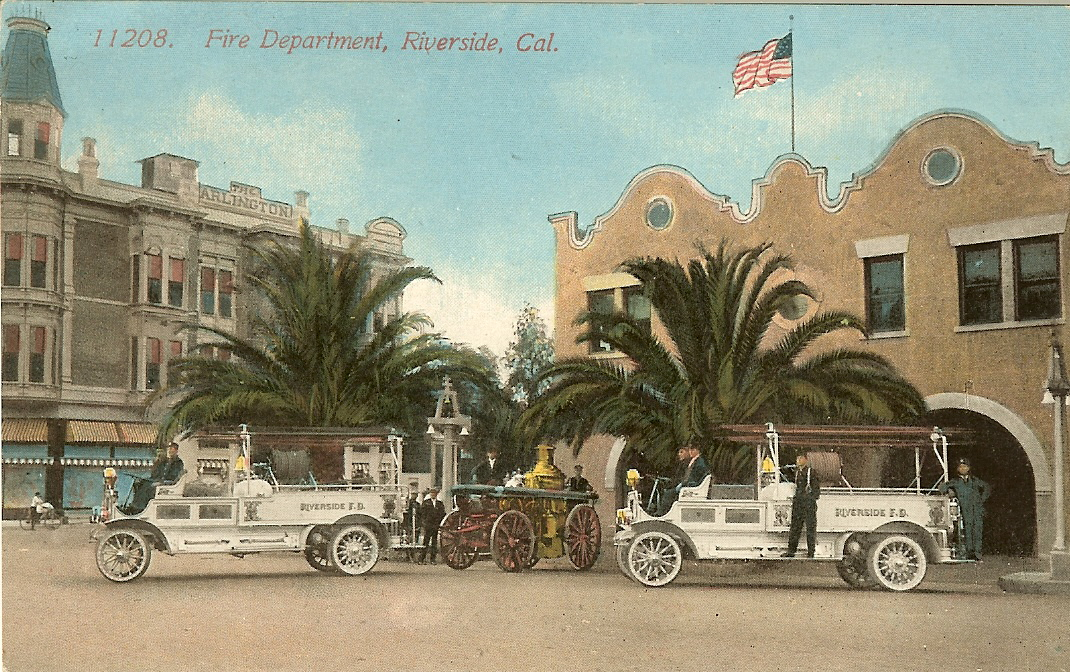
Fire Station#1 of the Riverside Fire Department, circa 1910, at the corner of 8th and Lime Streets (8th Street is now University Avenue)

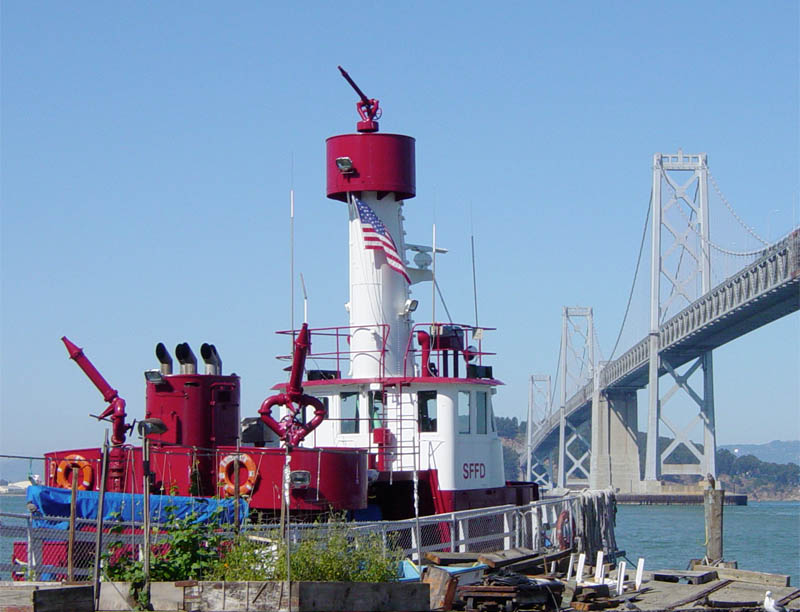
The San Francisco Fire Department's Fireboat Guardian stands on alert status near the Bay Bridge

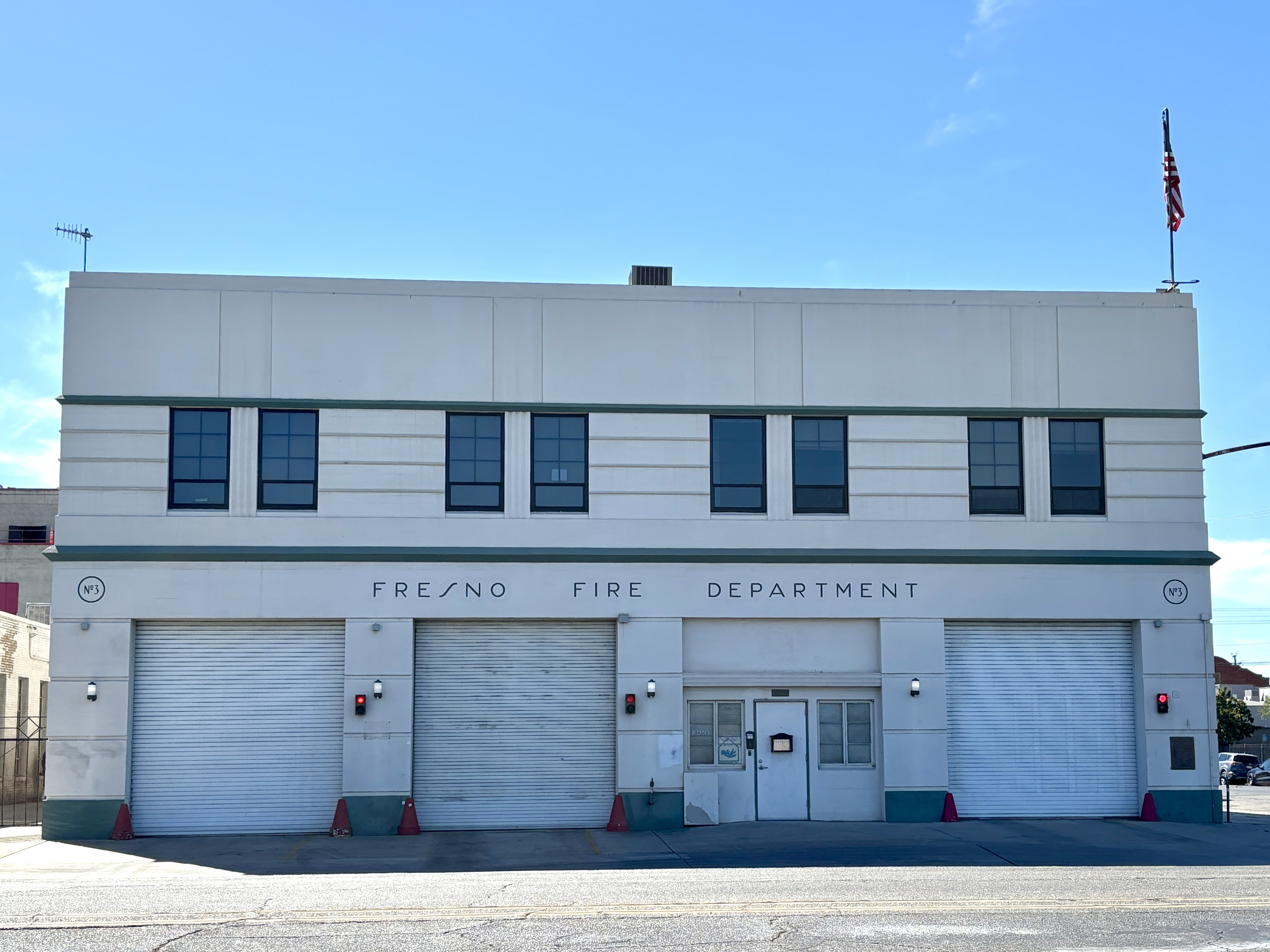
Fresno Fire Department No. 3, built 1938 in the PWA Moderne style

- Alameda County Fire Department
- Alhambra Fire Department
- Arcadia Fire Department
- Amador Fire Protection District
- Anaheim Fire & Rescue
- Antioch Fire Department
- Apple Valley Fire Protection District
- Auburn Fire Department
- Bakersfield Fire Department
- Beverly Hills Fire Department
- Bennett Valley Fire District
- Borrego Springs Fire Protection District
- Brea Fire Department
- Burbank Fire Department
- Burbank Airport Fire Department
- CAL FIRE Butte County - BTU/2100
- City of Biggs Fire Department
- City of Calimesa Fire Department
- Butte County Fire Department
- City of Gridley Fire Department
- City of Oroville Fire Department
- Town of Paradise Fire Department
- CAL FIRE
- City of Colton Fire Department
- Cathedral City Fire Department
- Chula Vista Fire Department
- City of Davis Fire Department
- Compton Fire Department
- Contra Costa Fire Protection District (Con Fire)
- East Contra Costa Fire Protection District (Defunct 2022)
- The Costa Mesa Fire & Rescue Department (CMFR)
- El Cerrito Fire Department
- Downey Fire Deportment
- Escondido Fire Department
- Escalon Consolidated Fire Protection District
- FIRESCOPE
- Fremont Fire Department
- Fresno Fire Department
- Glendale Fire Department
- Gold Ridge Fire Protection District serving Sebastopol, California and its county, Sonoma County, California.
- Hemet Fire Department
- Humboldt Bay Fire
- Huntington Beach Fire Department
- Idyllwild Fire Protection District (IFPD)
- Kern County Fire Department
- Livermore Pleasanton Fire Department (LFPD)
- Laguna Beach Fire Department (LBFD)
- Lincoln Fire Department
- Linden-Peters Fire Protection District (LPE)
- Long Beach Fire Department
- Los Angeles Fire Department (LAFD or LA City Fire)
- Los Angeles County Fire Department (LACoFD)
- La Tuna Canyon Fire & Rescue
- Merced Fire Department (California)
- Lockwood Valley Fire Protection District
- Lodi Fire Department (California)
- Milpitas Fire Department (California)
- Montebello Fire Department
- Monterey Park Fire Department
- Murrieta Fire & Rescue
- Modesto Fire Department
- Monrovia Fire Department
- Montebello Fire Department
- Monterey Park Fire Department
- Oakland Fire Department
- Oceanside Fire Department
- Ontario Fire Department
- Orange City Fire Department
- Orange County Fire Authority
- Palm Springs Fire Department
- Pasadena Fire Department
- Rattlesnake Mountain Volunteer Fire Department
- Redondo Beach Fire Department
- Rialto Fire Department
- Riverside Fire Department
- Rancho Cucomonga Fire Department
- Rocklin Fire Department
- Roseville Fire Department
- Sacramento Fire Department
- Sacramento Metropolitan Fire District
- San Bernardino County Fire and EMS Protection District
- San Diego Fire Department
- San Diego County Fire Department
- San Francisco Fire Department
- San Gabriel Fire Department
- San Marino Fire Department
- San Jose Fire Department
- San Ramon Valley Fire Protection District
- Santa Barbara City Fire Department
- Santa Barbara County Fire Department
- Santa Clara County Fire Department
- Santa Cruz Fire Department
- Santa Cruz County Fire Department
- Santa Monica Fire Department
- South Pasadena Fire Department
- South Placer Fire Protection District
- Soboba Band of Luiseno Indians Fire Department
- Stockton Fire Department
- Sierra Madre Fire Department
- Torrance Fire Department
- UCLA Fire Department
- Vacaville Fire Protection District
- Ventura County Fire Department
- West Covina Fire Department
- Woodland Fire Department
- Woodside Fire Protection District
- Yolo County Fire Department

== USAR Task Forces ==
As of 2025, California is home to eight Urban Search and Rescue Task Forces.

- California Task Force 1
- California Task Force 2
- California Task Force 3
- California Task Force 4
- California Task Force 5
- California Task Force 6
- California Task Force 7
- California Task Force 8
