= San Jose Fire Department =

Fire department in California, United States

San Jose Fire Department (SJFD)
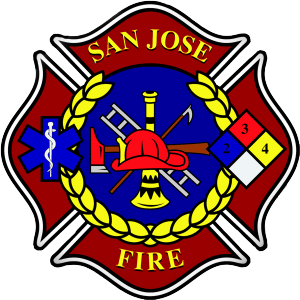

Operational area
- Country: United States
- State: California
- County: Santa Clara
- City: San Jose

Agency overview
- Established: January 27, 1854; 172 years ago
- Annual calls: 105,102
- Employees: 750+
- Staffing: Career
- Fire chief: Robert Sapien Jr.
- EMS level: ALS
- IAFF: 230
- Motto: "Courtesy and Service with Pride"

Facilities and equipment
- Battalions: 6
- Stations: 34
- Engines: 34
- Trucks: 9
- Tenders: 3
- HAZMAT: 1
- USAR: 1
- Airport crash: 3
- Wildland: 7 - type 6

Website
- www.sjfd.org
- IAFF website

The San José Fire Department (SJFD) provides firefighting, rescue and emergency medical services to the city of San Jose, California, United States. The San Jose Fire Department protects the third most populous city in California (after Los Angeles and San Diego) and the 13th most populous city in the nation.

== History ==
When fire limits were established, for the San Jose Common Council gathered sufficient funds to procure fire apparatus and equipment. On January 27, 1854, the Common Council approved Ordinance 239, formally recognizing San Jose Hook and Ladder Company No. 1 as a properly organized Fire Company and officially establishing the San Jose Fire Department. Joseph McGill was elected Foreman. This ordinance also mandated that the Foreman or Assistant Foremen should "wear a specific badge upon his or their hats as distinguishing his office."

The San José Fire Department's Torrent Engine Company #2 was stationed at San Jose City Hall from 1869 to 1951, when the San Jose Central Fire Station opened.

== Coverage ==
The San Jose Fire Department's jurisdiction covers San Jose’s incorporated city limits and unincorporated areas of the County of Santa Clara totaling approximately 180 square miles and 1.2 million residents.

SJFD is the emergency service provider for a number of high-hazard occupancies, including an International Airport; a municipal airport; 7 major hospitals (including 3 trauma centers, and 7 emergency departments); the SAP Center, home of the NHL San Jose Sharks, (maximum occupancy 20,000); San Jose State University (the oldest public institution of higher education on the West Coast), student population of 31,906; three regional super malls; and over 108 high-rise structures.

== Call volume ==
The San Jose Fire Department responds to more than 100,000 incidents annually.

== Services ==
The San Jose Fire Department is an “all risk” department meaning that it has the trained personnel and equipment to mitigate a variety of emergencies, and provides a wide array of emergency services and support services throughout the city. These include the following:

• Fire Suppression: Firefighters and fire apparatus that respond to extinguish fires of all types, including structure fires, vehicle fires, and vegetation fires and other fires.

• Advanced Life Support (ALS): All San Jose Fire Engine Companies and Truck Companies have firefighters trained to provide specialized medical care (unless, of course, they are marked out BLS for the entire shift). All firefighters are Emergency Medical Technicians. Some are EMT-Paramedics, meaning they have the special training and skills to treat patients with drugs, to intubate patients who are not breathing, to gain intravenous access, to provide defibrillation to patients in cardiac arrest, and a variety of other medical services.

• Urban Search and Rescue (USAR): Rescue teams are prepared to handle Confined Space, Low-Angle, High-Angle, Trench, Swift-water, Open water, Flood, Collapse and a variety of other technical rescues. Several department USAR members also serve on the FEMA Urban Search and Rescue Task Force, Urban Search and Rescue California Task Force 3. The San Jose Fire Department USAR team has been certified as a Type I resource, the highest level of USAR capability.

• Hazardous Materials (HazMat): A Hazardous Incident Team is trained to the HazMat Specialist level to identify hazardous materials using technical test procedures and contain, neutralize or otherwise mitigate dangerous gases, liquids or solids. The San Jose Fire Department HazMat team has been certified as a Type I resource, the highest level of HazMat capability.

• Aircraft Rescue and Firefighting: The department provides airplane crash fire suppression and rescue services by a specially equipped and trained crew based at the Norman Mineta San Jose International Airport.

• Fire Prevention: Firefighters and Fire Prevention Inspectors help ensure schools, businesses, and multi-occupancy dwellings follow fire safety codes and are safe for residents. While on emergency incidents such as medical calls, firefighters routinely check for smoke detectors and offer detectors or replace batteries.

• The Arson Unit: Responsible for investigating the origin and cause of fires. The unit is staffed by Investigators who are cross-trained as law enforcement officers with powers of arrest. Personnel in the unit are designated peace officers under California Penal Code Section 830.37(a).

• Public Education: Firefighters meet with the public to do home safety inspections, teach families about “Exit Drills in the Home,” teach fire safety techniques such as “Stop, Drop and Roll” in schools, and distribute fire or home safety literature. Some times the firefighters will do open houses at some of their fire stations.

• Emergency Preparedness: The Fire Department’s firefighters work with the public to encourage basic preparedness for routine or major catastrophes.

== Operations ==
The San Jose Fire Department currently operates out of 34 fire stations located throughout the city, organized into six battalions. Each battalion is commanded by a Battalion Chief.

Engines, Trucks, Rescue Medics and Battalion apparatus are staffed throughout the year. Some Wildland apparatus are not staffed during summer months. Under "Other", vans, utilities, reserve engines, air units, fire support units, rescue units, USAR trailers, and the USAR boat are unstaffed - personnel from Engines, Trucks and Rescue Medics staff those apparatus when they are needed to respond. Wildland engines are prefaced with a "6" to indicate they are Type VI engines based on the National Wildfire Coordinating Group rating criteria.

In November 2018, San Jose voters passed ballot measure T. This measure provides bond funds to support the building and repair of critical city infrastructure. Some of the projects planned for Measure T funds include construction of a new fire station in the Willow Glen neighborhood (Fire Station 37 at Lincoln Ave. and Curtner Ave.), rebuilding Fire Stations 8 and 23, and building two additional new stations. During calendar 2019, the city will adopt a new 5-year fire department infrastructure plan, which will include the timing for building and staffing those stations.

== Organization ==
The San Jose Fire Department is organized into five bureaus of operations: the Bureau of Administrative Services (BAS), the Bureau of Field Operations (BFO), the Bureau of EMS and Training (BET), the Bureau of Support Services (BSS), and the Bureau of Fire Prevention (BFP). The Fire Communications Division is staffed by non-sworn Fire Department dispatchers. These highly-skilled dispatchers meet or exceed the criteria required for the SJFD Communications Center to be nationally accredited.

=== Battalion 1 ===
Fire Station Number	Address	Engine Company	Truck Company	Rescue Medic Company	Other Units
1	225 N. Market St.	Engine 1	Truck 1		Command Van 1 & Battalion 1
3	98 Martha St.	Engine 3		Rescue Medic 3	
7	799 Laurel St.	Engine 7			
8	802 E. Santa Clara St.	Engine 8			
26	528 Tully Rd.	Engine 26		Rescue Medic 26	
30	454 Auzerais Ave.	Engine 30	Truck 30		MED 30

=== Battalion 2 ===
Fire Station Number	Address	Engine Company	Truck Company	Wildland Unit	Other units
2	2949 Alum Rock Ave.	Engine 2	Truck 2	Engine 302	Battalion 2
16	2001 S. King Rd.	Engine 16	Truck 16		
19	3292 Sierra Rd.	Engine 19		Engine 619	
21	2100 S. White Rd.	Engine 21		Water Tender 21	Engine 221 (Reserve)
31	3100 Ruby Ave.	Engine 31		Engine 631	

=== Battalion 5 ===
Fire Station Number	Address	Engine Company	Truck Company or USAR Unit	Rescue Medic Company	Other Units
5	1380 N. 10th St.	Engine 5			Battalion 5, Air Unit 5
20	1120 Coleman Ave.	Engine 20A, 20B (ARFF Units)		Rescue Medic 20	Reserve Engines 20C, 20D, and Rescue 620 (ARFF)
23	1771 Via Cinco de Mayo	Engine 23			
25	25 Wilson Way	Engine 25			
29	199 Innovation Dr.	Engine 29	Truck 29		HIT 29A, 29B, Foam 29
34	1634 Las Plumas Ave.	Engine 34	USAR 34A, 34B		USAR-C, USAR-D, USAR-E, USAR Trailers, USAR Boat

=== Battalion 10 ===
Fire Station Number	Address	Engine Company	Truck Company	Other units
4	710 Leigh Ave.	Engine 4		Engine 204 (Reserve Unit)
6	1386 Cherry Ave.	Engine 6		Fire Support Unit 3
10	511 S. Monroe St.	Engine 10		Battalion 10
14	1201 San Tomas Aquino Rd.	Engine 14	Truck 14	
15	1248 S. Blaney Ave.	Engine 15		
37	2191 Lincoln Ave.	Engine 37		

=== Battalion 13 ===
Fire Station Number	Address	Engine Company	Truck Company	Wildland Unit	Other units
9	3410 Ross Ave.	Engine 9	Truck 9	Engine 209 (Reserve Unit)	
12	5912 Cahalan Ave.	Engine 12		Engine 612	
13	4380 Pearl Ave.	Engine 13	Truck 13		Battalion 13, Utility 13, Engine 213 (Reserve)
17	5170 Coniston Way	Engine 17		Water Tender 17	Reserve Engine 617
22	6461 Bose Ln.	Engine 22			
28	19911 McKean Rd.	Engine 28		Engine 628	

=== Battalion 35 ===
Fire Station Number	Address	Engine Company	Truck Company	Wildland Unit	Other units
11	2840 The Villages Pkwy.	Engine 11			
18	4430 S. Monterey Rd.	Engine 18		Water Tender 18	
24	3910 Silver Creek.Rd	Engine 24		Engine 624	
27	6027 San Ignacio Way	Engine 27		Engine 627	
35	135 Poughkeepsie Rd.	Engine 35	Truck 35	Engine 335	Fire Support Unit 2

== Early history ==
El Pueblo of San Jose (the Town of San Jose) was protected by volunteer firemen with the founding of the Pueblo in 1777. It wasn't until 1854 that these volunteer bucket brigades would transform into the official San Jose Fire Department, labeled the San Jose Hook and Ladder Co. No. 1.

Originally consisting of volunteer firefighters in its infancy, the San Jose Fire Department (SJFD) was formally established by the city of San Jose on 27 January 1854, with the formation of the San Jose Hook and Ladder Co. No. 1. The San Jose Fire Department has since been in service for over 165 years and is one of the oldest fire departments in the United States.

== Notable fires ==
- Chinatown Fire of 1887

The suspicious fire began in the Chinese quarter of San Jose. The cause of the fire was never determined. To this day, many believe that racial tensions and anti-Asian sentiment led to the fire being intentionally set. Chinatown's structures were constructed mainly of wood, and the fire devastated the entire neighborhood which burnt to the ground. Because of the 1887 fire, Chinatown never fully rebuilt itself and its absence from the city can still be seen to this day. A plaque memorializing the fire can be found on the Fairmont Hotel near Plaza de Cesar Chavez in downtown San Jose.

- Santana Row Fire of 2002

The construction of Santana Row, an upscale shopping, housing, dining and entertainment complex, faced a major setback in 2002 when an 11-alarm fire (5-alarm within SJFD) went ablaze. The fire took several fire companies to put out, and the effort immediately became defensive as the San Jose firefighters turned their attention towards protecting surrounding homes and businesses from flying embers. The Santana Row Fire was the biggest fire in the history of the city.

- Donner-Houghton House Fire

In the early morning of July 17, 2007, a suspicious fire consumed the historic landmark located at 156 E. St. John Street in San Jose which once housed early San Jose Mayor Sherman Houghton and his wife, Donner Party survivor Eliza Donner Houghton. The San Jose Police Department was the first on the scene to evacuate squatters who took shelter in the historic house. The four-alarm fire left the historic house charred and irreparable, and the city decided to slowly demolish the building to ensure public safety and to also allow fire investigators to determine the cause of the incident. The city tried to salvage parts of the house in an effort to save as much history as possible. After investigation, it was believed that the fire was started by squatters who lived in or around the vacant house. The squatters often started small fires to stay warm and to cook meals. Mattresses and chairs were found on the property, indicating their occupancy. The city of San Jose faced criticism for allowing the historic house to be vacant for so long, allowing unwanted squatters to break in and seek quarters inside unsafe living conditions.

== Fallen firefighters ==
Firefighter	Company	Date of death	Cause of death
Fireman Miles McDermott	Eureka Hose Company	26 September 1898	Collapsed Building
Fireman Paul Furrier	Hook & Ladder Company Number 1	18 April 1906	Collapsed Building
Chief Richard F. Brown	---	10 September 1910	Overturned Chief Buggy
Captain Fred W. Hambly	Chemical Company Number 1	21 January 1921	Smoke and Gas Inhalation
Fireman Peter Consolacio	Chemical Company Number 6	19 July 1925	Electrocution Accident
Chief Herman W. Hobson	---	7 October 1926	Pneumonia
Captain George Welch	Engine Company Number 2	18 September 1929	Heart Attack
Fireman Starr G. Hilton	Chemical Company Number 3	25 November 1931	Overturned Fire Rig
Fireman Donald E. Carrera	Engine Company Number 10	13 October 1963	Head Trauma
Fire Engineer William Anger	Engine Company Number 8	21 February 1981	Vehicle Collision
Captain Robert Sparks	Engine Company Number 28	17 March 1981	Heart Attack
Captain Timothy A. Strysko		31 May 2002	Cancer
Battalion Chief Michael Jonasson		4 May 2005	Cancer (Leukemia)
Firefighter Ed McClanhan	Engine Company Number 26	25 May 2006	Cancer (Lung)
Firefighter Felix Medrano	Engine Company Number 16	10 February 2010	Cancer
Firefighter Jack Salois		27 November 2010	Cancer
Captain Jose Martinez	Engine Company Number 12	10 August 2012	Cancer
Captain Richard Wardall	Fire Station 20	10 July 2015	Cancer
