= Urban Search and Rescue Florida Task Force 1 =

Urban Search and Rescue Florida Task Force 1 (FL-TF1) is a FEMA Urban Search and Rescue Task Force based in Miami-Dade County, Florida and sponsored by the Miami-Dade Fire Rescue Department. FL-TF1 responds to disasters to provide search and rescue, medical, communications support.

As with all FEMA Task Forces, FL-TF1 is trained in physical search and rescue in damaged or collapsed structures as well as in areas that have sustained significant flooding. Additionally the task force specializes in providing medical care at the scene of a disaster for trapped victims. FL-TF1 is also specifically trained in satellite communication systems that can be used in areas where normal communication infrastructure has been damaged.

Once notified by the Federal Emergency Management Agency (FEMA), the team has a six-hour window to mobilize 70 team members to report to a prearranged departure point. FL-TF1 is composed mostly of personnel from the Miami-Dade Fire Rescue Department but other outside specialists are brought in as needed. In addition, FL-TF1 has nine FEMA certified canine teams, each composed of a handler and a search dog.

== History ==
In the early 1980s two fire departments, Miami-Dade Fire Rescue and the Fairfax County Fire and Rescue Department out of Fairfax County, Virginia worked together under an agreement with the Office of Foreign Disaster Assistance to provide international search and rescue assistance in times of disaster. Starting in 1991, FEMA incorporated a USAR team into its federal response plan. These 20+ teams that would later become the FEMA Urban Search and Rescue Task Forces were chosen throughout the country based on geographic location with local public safety departments as sponsoring agencies.

In 2001, it was one of only two FEMA task forces trained for overseas deployments, the other being Urban Search and Rescue Virginia Task Force 1.

== Deployments ==
Since its creation in the 1980s, FL-TF1 has responded to a wide range of disasters around the world.

=== Earthquakes ===
Year	Event	Location
1985	Mexico City Earthquake	Mexico City
1986	San Salvador Earthquake	El Salvador
1988	Armenia Earthquake	Armenia
1990	Luzon Earthquake	Philippines
1997	Cariaco Earthquake	Venezuela
1999	Colombia Earthquake	Colombia
1999	Izmit Earthquake	Turkey
1999	Jiji Earthquake	Taiwan
2010	Haiti Earthquake	Haiti

=== Hurricanes ===
Year	Event	Location
1988	Hurricane Gilbert	Jamaica
1989	Hurricane Hugo	Eastern Caribbean
1992	Hurricane Andrew	Miami
1995	Hurricane Luis	Caribbean
1995	Hurricane Marilyn	Caribbean
1995	Hurricane Opal	North Florida
2000	Hurricane Keith	Belize
2004	Hurricane Charley	Charlotte County, Florida
2005	Hurricane Katrina	New Orleans, Louisiana
2008	Hurricane Gustav	Texas
2008	Hurricane Ike	Gulf Coast
2017	Hurricane Harvey	Texas
2017	Hurricane Irma	Florida Keys
2017	Hurricane Maria	Puerto Rico
2018	Hurricane Florence	South Carolina
2018	Hurricane Michael	Florida panhandle
2019	Hurricane Dorian	The Bahamas
2021	Hurricane Ida	Mississippi
2022	Hurricane Ian	Southwest Florida, Florida
2023	Hurricane Idalia	Big Bend region, Florida
2024	Hurricane Debby	Steinhatchee, Florida
2024	Hurricane Helene	Big Bend region, Florida
2024	Hurricane Milton	Siesta Key, Florida

=== Building explosions and collapses ===
Year	Event	Location
1995	Oklahoma City Bombing	Oklahoma City, Oklahoma
1996	Colombo Central Bank Bombing	Colombo, Sri Lanka
1996	Humberto Vidal Explosion	San Juan, Puerto Rico
2001	World Trade Center Attack	Lower Manhattan, New York
2001	Pentagon Attack	Washington, D.C.
2007	Barbados Apartment Collapse	Barbados
2021	Surfside Condominium Collapse	Surfside, Florida

=== Aviation Disasters ===
Year	Event	Location
1995-96	American Airlines Flight 965	Buga, Colombia
1996	ValuJet Flight 592	Everglades, Florida

=== Communications support ===
Year	Event	Location
1989	Romanian Revolution	Romania
1991	Iraqi Uprisings	Northern Iraq & Turkey
1994	Rwandan Genocide	Rwanda
1994	Operation Uphold Democracy	Haiti
1995	Soufrière Hills Eruption	Montserrat
1995	Sierra Leone Civil War	Sierra Leone
1996	Bosnian War	Bosnia and Herzegovina
1998	U.S Embassy Bombing	Nairobi, Kenya

=== Other Events ===
Year	Event	Location
2000	2000 Mozambique Flood	Mozambique
