= Urban Search and Rescue New Mexico Task Force 1 =

Urban Search and Rescue New Mexico Task Force or NM-TF1 was a FEMA Urban Search and Rescue Task Force based in the State of New Mexico sponsored by the State.

FEMA revoked accreditation for NM-TF1 on 16 September 2015 due to a persistent inability to maintain a fully operational urban search and rescue team.
