= Urban Search and Rescue New York Task Force 1 =

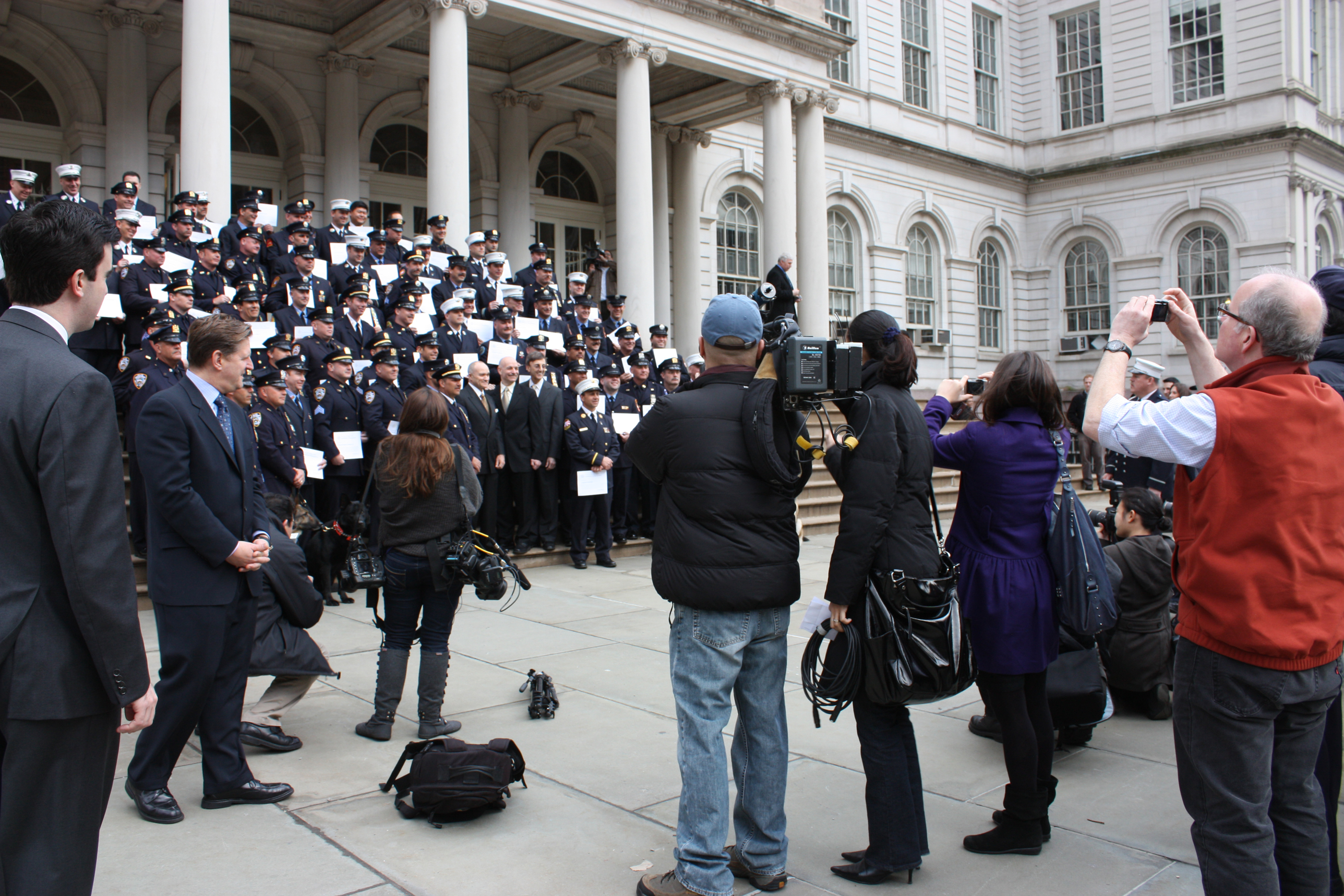
Recognition for Haiti efforts

NYC Urban Search & Rescue Task Force or also known by its Federal Emergency Management Agency (FEMA) designation of NY-TF1 is a FEMA Urban Search and Rescue Task Force based in New York City, New York. NY-TF1 is managed by the NYC Office of Emergency Management (NYCOEM) and its members mainly come from Fire Department of New York and the New York City Police Department.

They were deployed to the World Trade Center bombing and Oklahoma City bombing, in 1993 and 1995, respectively.

After the 2010 Haiti earthquake the team deployed to Haiti and rescued a pair of siblings from a collapsed building on January 21, 2010. This was their 5th rescue of the activation.
