= Urban Search and Rescue Tennessee Task Force 1 =

Urban Search and Rescue Tennessee Task Force or TN-TF1 is a FEMA Urban Search and Rescue Task Force based in Memphis, Tennessee. TN-TF1 is sponsored by the Memphis Fire Services. The team consists of professional firefighters, physicians, nurses, paramedics, structural engineers, canine search specialists, heavy equipment operators, and other specialists.

In April 1997, it was reported that TN-TF1 was preparing to get ready for deployments. It would become one of the only task forces in the Mid-South, the closest at that time being those in Florida and Nebraska.
