= Urban Search and Rescue Missouri Task Force 1 =

FEMA Urban Search and Rescue Task Force based in Boone County, Missouri

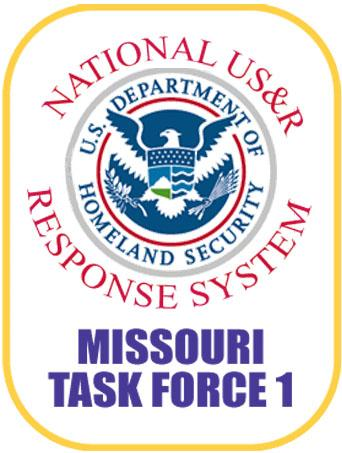
Missouri Task Force 1 Patch

Urban Search and Rescue Missouri Task Force 1 (MO-TF1) is a FEMA Urban Search and Rescue Task Force based in Boone County, Missouri. The task force is sponsored by the Boone County Fire Protection District and is designated as the Weapons of Mass Destruction (WMD) Response Team for the state of Missouri.

== Overview ==
MO-TF1 is capable of performing the following operations:

- Conduct physical search and rescue operations in damaged/collapsed structures, flooded areas and transportation accident scenes
- Provide emergency medical care at disaster sites for trapped victims and task force members
- Carry out reconnaissance duties to assess damage and determine needs, then use that information to provide feedback to all agencies involved
- Provide disaster communications support using state-of-the-art satellite systems
- Conduct hazardous materials surveys/evaluations of affected areas
- Assist in stabilizing damaged structures, including shoring and cribbing operations

Urban search and rescue (US&R) involves the location, rescue (extrication) and initial medical stabilization of victims trapped in confined spaces. Structural collapse is most often the cause of victims being trapped, but victims may also be trapped in transportation accidents, mines and collapsed trenches.

Urban search and rescue (US&R) is considered a "multi-hazard" discipline, as it may be needed for a variety of emergencies or disasters, including earthquakes, hurricanes, typhoons, storms and tornadoes, floods, dam failures, technological accidents, terrorist activities, and hazardous materials releases. The events may be slow in developing, as in the case of hurricanes, or sudden, as in the case of earthquakes.

If a disaster event warrants national US&R support, FEMA will deploy the three closest task forces within six hours of notification, and additional teams as necessary. The role of these task forces is to support state and local emergency responders' efforts to locate victims and manage recovery operations.

Each task force consists of 70 specially trained personnel (two 35-person teams), four canines and a comprehensive equipment cache. US&R task force members work in four areas of specialization: search, to find victims trapped after a disaster; rescue, which includes safely digging victims out of tons of collapsed concrete and metal; technical, made up of structural specialists who make rescues safe for the rescuers; and medical, which cares for the victims before and after a rescue.

== Organization ==
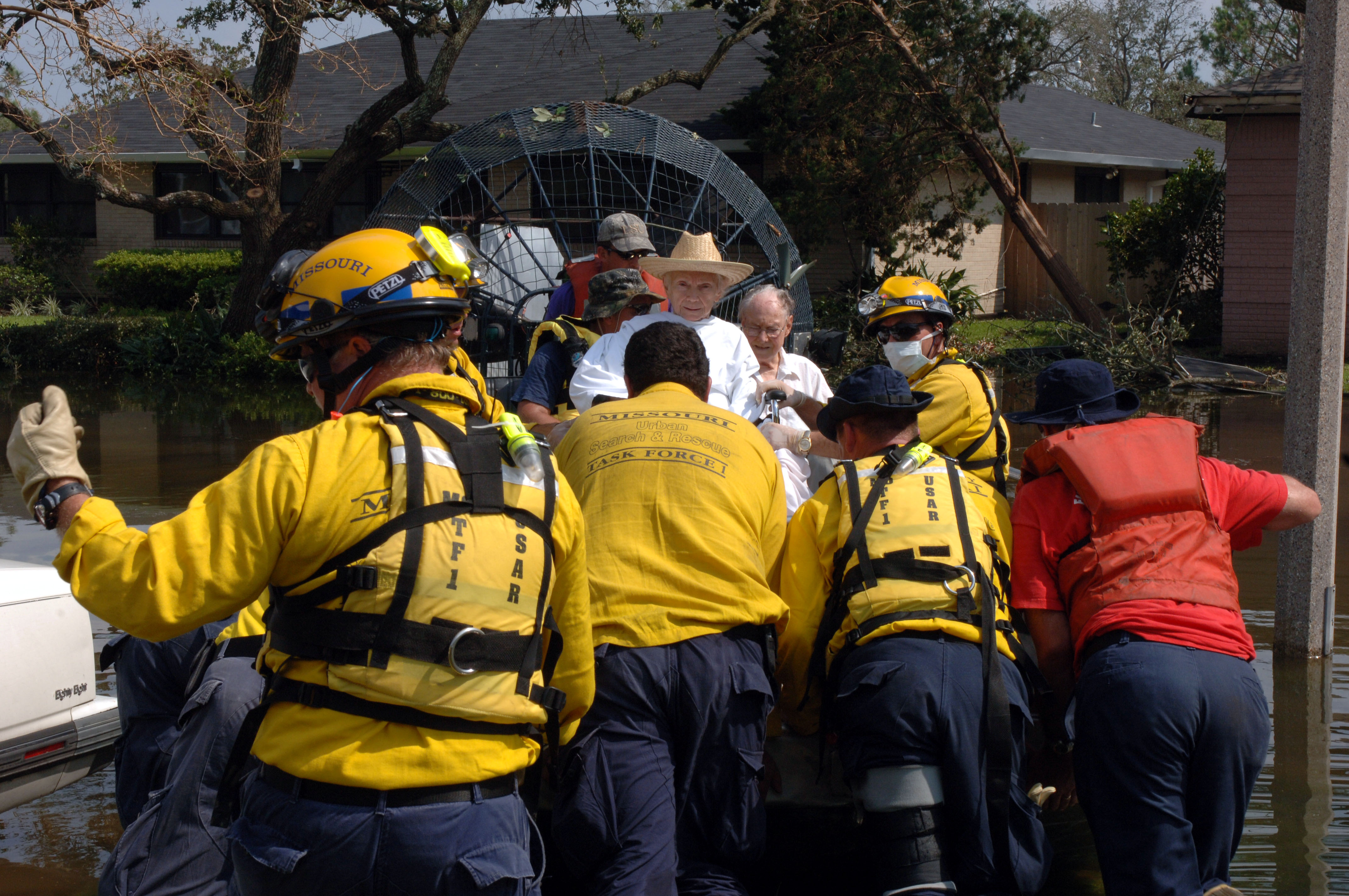
Members of MO-TF1 rescuing a couple of Hurricane Katrina victims.

The task force is divided into six specialized teams.

Search
The search team is responsible for entering a collapsed structure to locate victims and identify hazards. The team uses electronic listening devices, fiber-optic cameras capability and specially trained search and rescue dogs.
Rescue
The rescue team is responsible for cutting through concrete, metal and wood to reach the victims once they have been located.
Hazardous Materials
The hazmat team focuses on detecting any hazardous materials at the scene.
Medical
The medical team, composed of physicians and paramedics, provides emergency medical care for both victims and task force members.
Logistics
The logistics team has communications and logistics specialist that provides support for the other teams.
Plans
This final team is made up of technical information specialists, hazardous materials specialists and structural engineers that assess the potential for additional collapse and other hazards.

== Member Departments ==
- Boone County Fire Protection District (Sponsoring Agency)
- Black Jack Fire District Archived 2009-01-18 at the Wayback Machine
- Columbia Fire Department
- Cooper County Fire District
- Clayton Fire Department
- Creve Coeur Fire Protection District
- Eureka Fire Protection District
- Jefferson City Fire Department Archived 2009-03-02 at the Wayback Machine
- Kansas City Fire Department
- Mehlville Fire Department
- Metro West Fire Protection District
- O'Fallon Fire Department
- Springfield Fire Department
- St. Charles Fire Department
- Union Fire Protection District
- Wentzville Fire Protection District
- West County EMS and Fire Protection District Archived 2013-10-02 at the Wayback Machine

== Deployments ==
=== Federal deployments ===
- World Trade Center - New York City, New York (September 2001)
- Space Shuttle Columbia - Texas (February 2003)
- Hurricane Isabel - Virginia (September 2003)
- Hurricane Dennis - Mississippi (July 2005)
- Hurricane Katrina - New Orleans, Louisiana (August & September 2005)
- Hurricane Ernesto - Atlanta, Georgia (August & September 2006)
- Hurricane Dean - Texas (August 2007)
- Hurricane Dolly - Texas (July 2008)
- Republican National Convention - Minneapolis, Minnesota (August & September 2008)
- Hurricane Ike - Lafayette, Louisiana (September 2008)
- Hurricane Sandy - Herndon, Virginia (October & November 2012)
- Colorado Floods - Loveland, Colorado (September 2013)
- Hurricane Matthew - North Carolina (October 2016)
- Hurricane Harvey - Texas (August & September 2017)
- Hurricane Florence - Brunswick County, North Carolina (September 2018)
- Hurricane Michael - Florida (October 2018)
- Hurricane Dorian - South Carolina (August & September 2019)
- Hurricane Laura - Texas (August 2020)
- Hurricane Sally - Louisiana (September 2020)
- Hurricane Delta - Baton Rouge, Louisiana (October 2020)

=== State Deployments ===
- - St. Louis, Missouri (1996)
- - Centralia, Missouri (2003)
- Elks Lodge Building Collapse - Clinton, Missouri (June 2006)
- Flooding - Piedmont, Missouri (March 2008)
- Tornado - Newton County, Missouri (May 2008)
- Tornado - Fort Leonard Wood, Missouri (December 2010)
- Tornado - Joplin, Missouri (May 2011)
- Flooding - St. Louis, Missouri (January 2016)
- Flooding - West Plains, Missouri (May 2017)
- Tornado - Jefferson City, Missouri (May 2019)

== See also ==
- Boone County Sheriff's Department (Missouri)
