= Urban Search and Rescue Ohio Task Force 1 =

Urban Search and Rescue Ohio Task Force 1 or OH-TF1 is a FEMA Urban Search and Rescue Task Force based in Dayton, Ohio. OH-TF1 is sponsored by the municipalities in the Miami Valley.

== Deployment ==
The following list may be incomplete, especially between 2008 and 2018:

- 1998 - Debruce Grain Elevator Explosion
- 2001 - World Trade Center
- 2002 - Salt Lake City Winter Olympic Games
- 2003 - Columbia Space Shuttle Debris Recovery
- 2003 - Hurricane Isabel
- 2004 - Democratic National Convention
- 2004 - Hurricane Frances
- 2004 - Hurricane Ivan
- 2005 - Hurricane Dennis
- 2005 - Hurricane Katrina
- 2005 - Hurricane Ophelia
- 2005 - Hurricane Rita
- 2006 - Hurricane Ernesto
- 2008 - Hurricane Gustav
- 2008 - Hurricane Hanna
- 2008 - Hurricane Ike
- 2011 - Hurricane Irene
- 2012 - Hurricane Sandy
- 2016 - Hurricane Matthew
- 2018 - Hurricane Florence
- 2018 - Hurricane Michael
- 2019 - Hurricane Dorian
- 2020 - Hurricane Laura
- 2021 - Surfside condominium building collapse
- 2023 - Maui Wildfires
