= Urban Search and Rescue California Task Force 8 =

Urban Search and Rescue California Task Force 8 or CA-TF8 is a FEMA Urban Search and Rescue Task Force based in San Diego, California. CA-TF8 is sponsored by the San Diego Fire-Rescue Department.
