= FEMA Urban Search and Rescue Task Force =

Task force in American emergency management

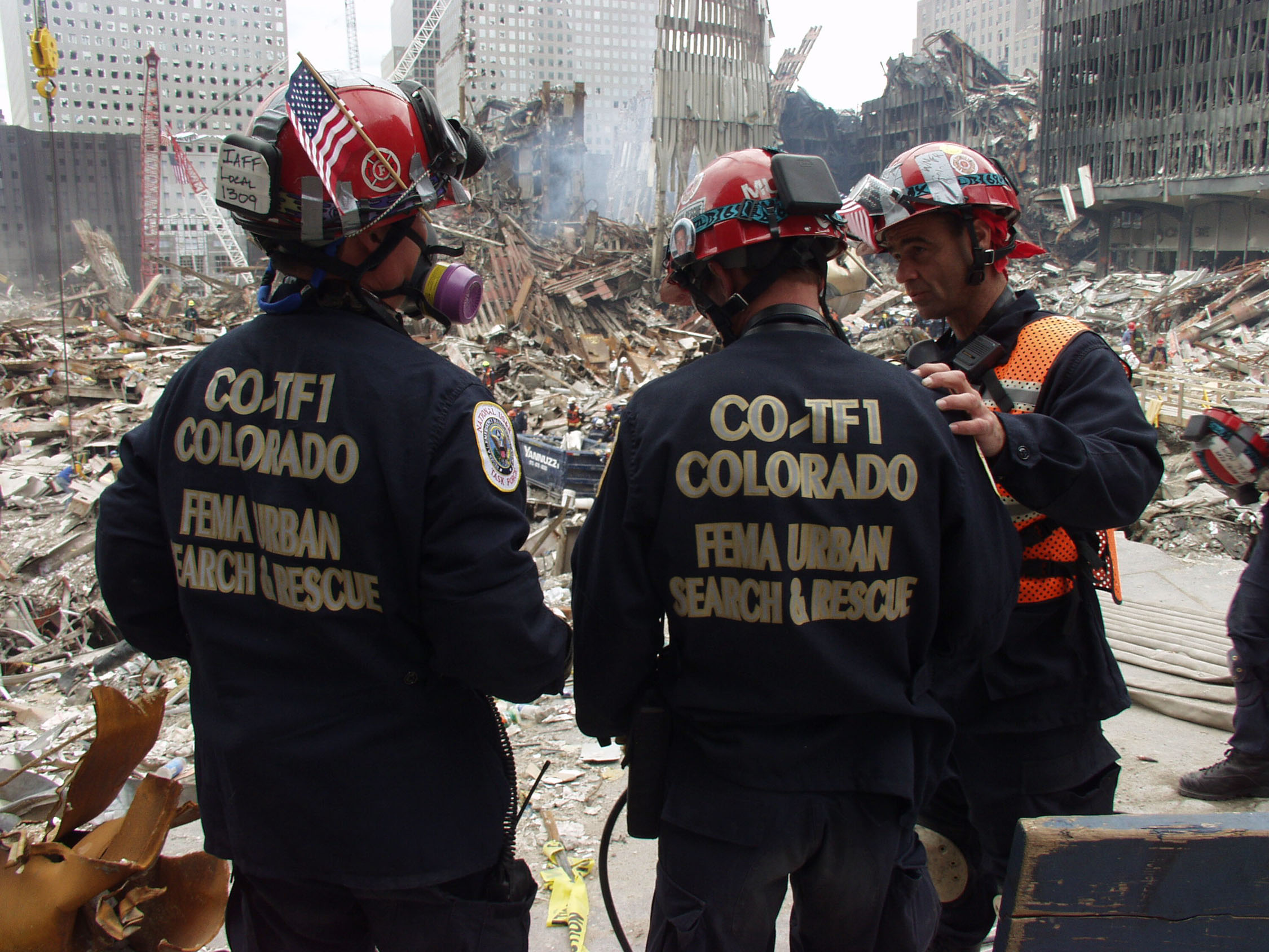
Members of FEMA US&R Task Force at World Trade Center after the 9/11 attacks

A FEMA Urban Search and Rescue Task Force (US&R Task Force) is a team of individuals specializing in urban search and rescue, disaster recovery, and emergency triage and medicine. The teams are deployed to emergency and disaster sites within six hours of notification. The Federal Emergency Management Agency (FEMA) created the Task Force concept to provide support for large scale disasters in the United States. FEMA provides financial, technical and training support for the Task Forces as well as creating and verifying the standards of Task Force personnel and equipment.

There are 28 Task Forces in the United States, each sponsored by a local agency. In the event of a disaster in the United States, the nearest three Task Forces will be activated and sent to the site of the disaster. If the situation is large enough, additional teams will be activated.

== Task Force makeup ==
Each Task Force is capable of deploying as a Type I with 70 personnel or a Type III with 28 personnel. This deployment configuration is increased if the Task Force mobilizes for a ground transport.

Each task force member is a specialist in one of four areas:

- Search - locating victims of a disaster by using specialized electronic equipment and tools to search for missing or trapped victims, especially rescue personnel who may be stuck inside of a collapsed structure.
- Rescue - extricating a victim from the location where they are trapped, usually involving removing debris from around the victim. This is accomplished by using an extensive array of powered tools like saws, jackhammers, etc.
- Technical - structural specialists who provide engineering support for the rescuers by using materials to see where the engineering was done and how.
- Medical - providing medical treatment for the team, canines and victims before, during and after rescue by using medical monitoring equipment as well as splinting equipment, medications, etc.

The search and rescue personnel are organized into four rescue squads, each composed of an officer and five rescue specialists, and are capable of working 12-hour alternating shifts. The medical personnel include two task force physicians and four medical specialists.

=== Canine rescuers ===
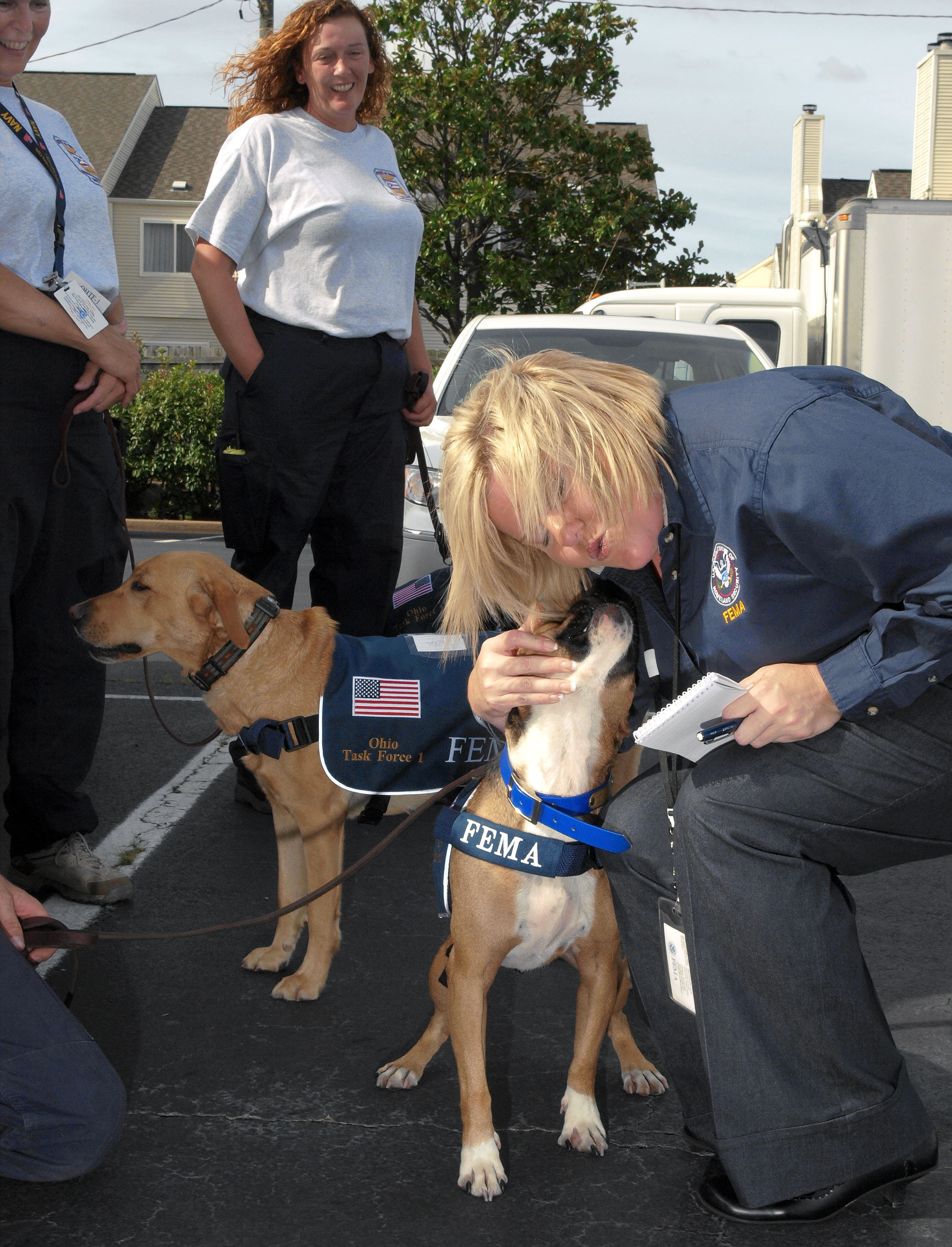
Rescue dogs

The canine rescuers are a critical element of each US&R Task Force as their keen sense of smell allows them to locate victims that might go undiscovered. The majority of the dog handlers on the Task Forces are civilian volunteers. The dogs are usually considered to be family pets by the handlers when the dogs are not on duty.

The canine rescuers will become unmotivated if they are unsuccessful in locating victims, as they consider search and rescue to be a type of game. To keep the canines engaged after long hours of working, one of the Task Force members will hide in the rubble so the dog will have a successful 'find'. In most instances, the dogs do not wear any equipment (collars, vests, booties, etc.) while working a debris pile. Protective booties may be used in areas where traction is not a primary safety concern. However, on large, unstable debris piles dogs typically do not wear booties or other protective equipment as they need to be able to splay their paws to obtain maximum traction and maintain balance. Harnesses, collars and other equipment can also pose a serious risk to the dog while working if they were to become snagged on steel rebar or other items contained within a disaster site. Because the dogs often work out of sight and out of reach of the handler, it is critical to minimize the possibility of the dog becoming trapped in a confined space or choking from an entangled collar. Because of the distinct possibility of injury from broken glass and metal, the medical unit maintains supplies for the canine rescuers.

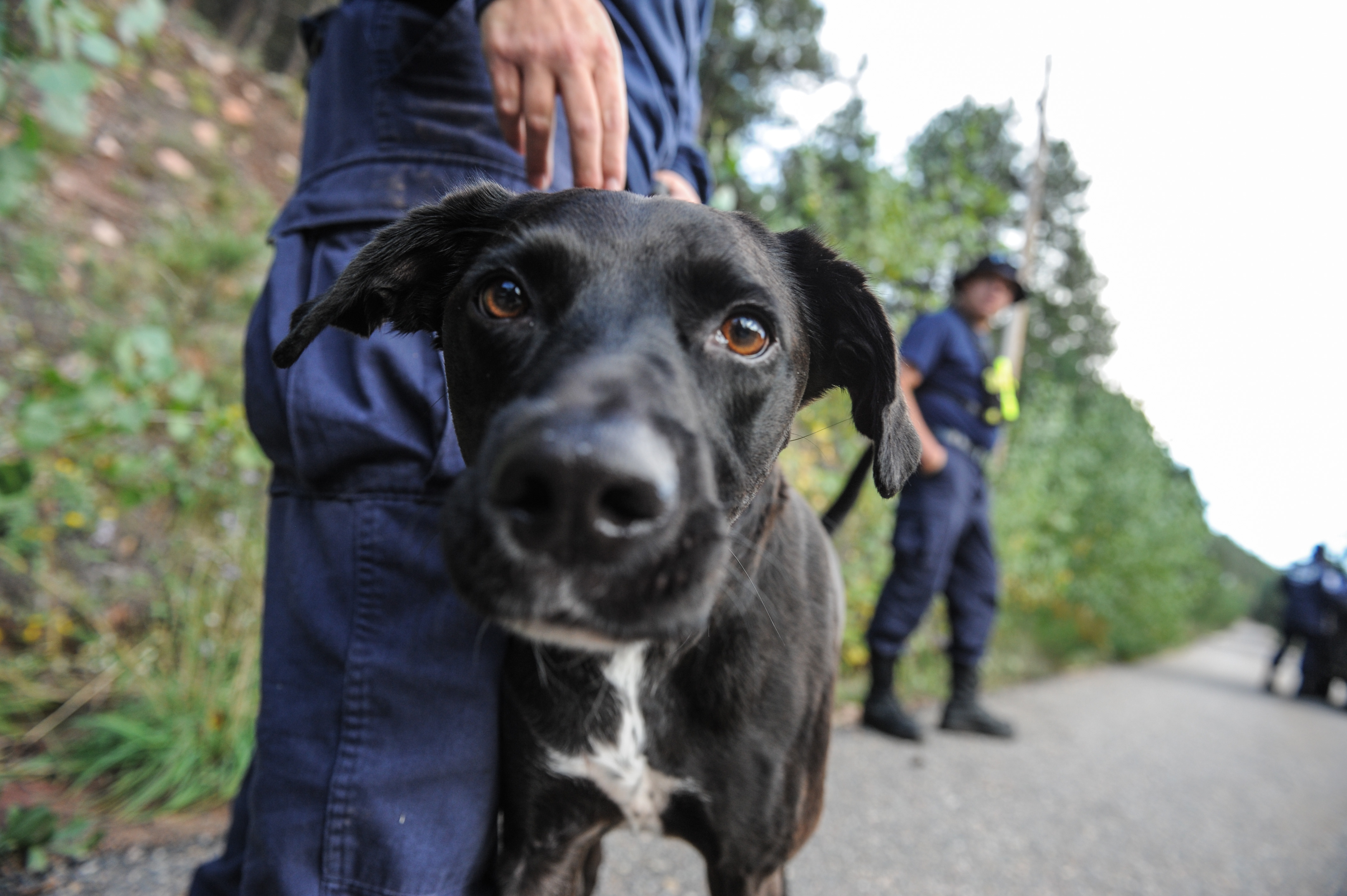
A canine rescuer on assignment after the 2013 Colorado floods

After first passing an evaluation of basic obedience, alert, directional control, agility and search skills currently known as an FSA (Foundational Skills Assessment), all canine/handler teams must pass an advanced certification known as a Certification Evaluation (or CE). This advanced certification process evaluates the ability of the canine and handler to locate an unknown number of buried subjects in multiple rubble piles in a limited period of time. All canine teams in the FEMA USAR system must achieve and maintain an advanced certification through the Certification Evaluation program to be considered a depolyable resource. This process is analogous to the Type II Basic and Type I Advanced certifications used prior to 2006.

== History ==
The FEMA Task Force traces its roots to the Special Medical Response Teams from the Pennsylvania coal mines in the late 1970s.

In the early 1980s, the Fairfax County Fire and Rescue Department and Miami-Dade County Fire Department created search and rescue teams to deal with rescue operations in collapsed buildings. The State Department and the Office of Foreign Disaster Aid requested the help of these teams to assist with rescue operations in the 1985 Mexico City, the 1990 Luzon and the 1989 Leninakan earthquakes.

After the 1989 Loma Prieta earthquake, seeing the value in having a network of such teams in the United States, FEMA created the National Urban Search and Rescue (US&R) Response System that same year. In 1992, the concept was incorporated into the Federal Response Plan first published in 1992 and was later retained in the National Response Plan and the National Response Framework. FEMA sponsored 25 national urban search-and-rescue task forces. The number of teams has expanded to 28 since 1991.

=== Notable US&R Task Force responses ===
Task Forces respond to a variety of different situations ranging from natural disasters such as hurricanes and earthquakes to man-made disasters such as gas explosions and bombings. Listed below are a few of the notable situations that US&R Task Forces have responded to:

- Hurricane Iniki, Kauai, Hawaii - September 11, 1992
- Northridge earthquake, Los Angeles County, California - January 17, 1994
- Oklahoma City bombing, Oklahoma City, Oklahoma - April 19, 1995
- Hurricane Opal, Fort Walton Beach, Florida - October 6, 1995
- Humberto Vidal Explosion, Río Piedras, Puerto Rico - November 21, 1996
- DeBruce Grain Elevator explosion, Wichita, Kansas - 8 June 1998
- Izmit, Turkey earthquake - August 17, 1999
- 1999 Athens earthquake - September 7, 1999
- Hurricane Floyd - North Carolina - September 16, 1999
- Düzce, Turkey earthquake - 12 November 1999
- World Trade Center and Pentagon attacks, New York, New York and Washington, D.C. - September 11, 2001
- 2002 Winter Olympics, Salt Lake City, Utah - February 8–24, 2002 (Task Forces acted in a supporting role)
- Hurricane Katrina - August 27 - September 30, 2005
- 2010 Port-au-Prince, Haiti earthquake
- 2011 Christchurch, New Zealand earthquake (CA-TF2)
- 2011 Tōhoku, Japan earthquake and tsunami (CA-TF2, VA-TF1)
- Hurricane Sandy October 29, 2012
- 2014 Oso mudslide March 22, 2014
- Hurricane Matthew Florida, Georgia, North Carolina, and South Carolina October 6, 2016
- The 2017 Atlantic Hurricane Season to include Hurricane Harvey August 24, 2017, Hurricane Irma September 4, 2017, and Hurricane Maria September 17, 2017
- 2023 Hawaii wildfires - August 8, 2023

== Task Force locations ==
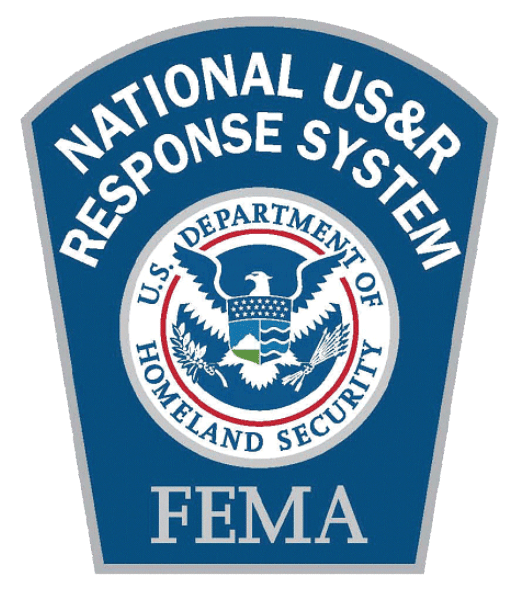
The patch of the FEMA Urban Search and Rescue response system. This patch is usually seen on the uniforms of US&R teams along with a patch of the individual task force.

The 28 teams of the US&R Task Force program are spread throughout the United States. The teams are identified by the official two-letter U.S. Postal Service state abbreviations followed by the letters TF for Task Force and a sequential number for the number of the task force for that state. The numbering of the Task Forces is in alphabetical order of the sponsoring agency location within each state.

- AZ-TF1 - Phoenix, Arizona - Phoenix Fire Department
- CA-TF1 - Los Angeles, California - Los Angeles City Fire Department
- CA-TF2 - Los Angeles County, California - Los Angeles County Fire Department
- CA-TF3 - Menlo Park, California - Menlo Park Fire District
- CA-TF4 - Oakland, California - Oakland Fire Department
- CA-TF5 - Orange County, California - Orange County Fire Authority
- CA-TF6 - Riverside, California - Riverside Fire Department
- CA-TF7 - Sacramento, California - Sacramento Fire Department
- CA-TF8 - San Diego, California - San Diego Fire Department
- CO-TF1 - Lakewood, Colorado - West Metro Fire Rescue
- FL-TF1 - Miami-Dade County, Florida - Miami-Dade Fire Rescue Department
- FL-TF2 - Miami, Florida - Miami Fire Department
- IN-TF1 - Indianapolis, Indiana - Indianapolis Fire Department
- MD-TF1 - Montgomery County, Maryland - Montgomery County Fire & Rescue Service
- MA-TF1 - Beverly, Massachusetts - City of Beverly Fire Department
- MO-TF1 - Boone County, Missouri - Boone County Fire Protection District
- NE-TF1 - Lincoln, Nebraska - Lincoln Fire & Rescue Department
- NV-TF1 - Clark County, Nevada - Clark County Fire Department
- NJ-TF1 - Lakehurst, New Jersey - New Jersey State Police
- NY-TF1 - New York City, New York - Fire Department of New York, New York City Police Department
- OH-TF1 - Miami Valley, Ohio - Miami Valley Fire EMS Alliance
- PA-TF1 - Philadelphia, Pennsylvania - Philadelphia Fire Department
- TN-TF1 - Memphis, Tennessee - Memphis Fire Services
- TX-TF1 - College Station, Texas - Texas A&M Engineering Extension Service
- UT-TF1 - Salt Lake City, Utah - Unified Fire Authority
- VA-TF1 - Fairfax County, Virginia - Fairfax County Fire and Rescue Department
- VA-TF2 - Virginia Beach, Virginia - Virginia Beach Fire Department
- WA-TF1 - Pierce County, Washington - Pierce County Department of Emergency Management

The U.S. Army's 911th Engineer Company, modeled on a FEMA USAR Task Force, provides additional response to the National Capital Region.

== Task Force equipment ==
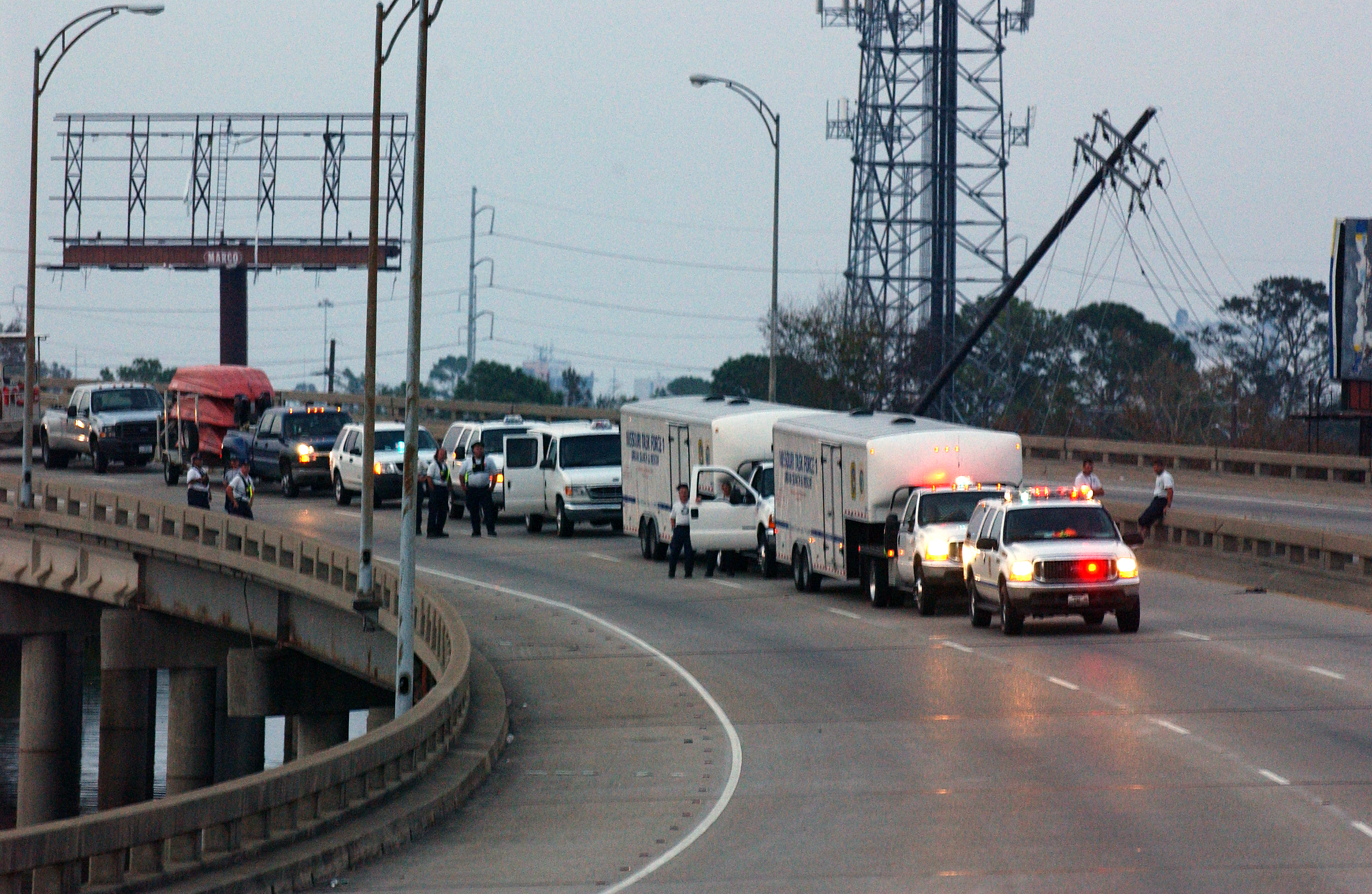
FEMA Urban Search and Rescue Task Force equipment in Louisiana after Hurricane Katrina

FEMA has created a standardized list of equipment that each Task Force maintains. The 16,400 pieces of equipment are cached and palletized for quick access and transportation. The complete load of equipment weighs 60,000 pounds (27,215 kg) and is designed to be transported by tractor trailer or in the cargo hold of one C-17 transport aircraft or two C-130 transport aircraft.

The equipment cache allows the Task Force to operate independently for up to four days. The cache contains five categories of equipment: Medical, Search and Rescue, Communications, Technical Support and Logistics.

=== Medical ===
The medical portion of the cache includes medical treatment and tools to provide sophisticated medical treatment for victims and task force members, including limited treatment of disaster search canines. The treatment materials are designed to be enough to handle 10 critical cases, 15 moderate cases and 25 minor cases.

Items included in the medical cache are medicines, intravenous fluids, blankets, suture sets, airways, tracheal tubes, defibrillators, burn treatment supplies, bone saws and scalpels. On site, the "durable" medical equipment will stay with the Task Force when patients are transferred to other medical facilities. The local medical facilities must provide their own medical equipment as the equipment may be needed again by the Task Force.

=== Search and rescue ===
The search and rescue portion of the cache contains all the equipment that the search and rescue teams will need to extricate victims from debris. Technical search tools include telescopic cameras with heat detecting sensors and seismic listening devices (Delsar).

Construction type equipment includes concrete saws, jackhammers, drills and rope, and technical rescue type equipment such as lifting airbags, shore systems, and hydraulic rescue tools. Non-reusable shoring material such as lumber and pipe is not included in the cache, and is to be found or acquired at the disaster site.

=== Communications ===
Equipment used includes generators, lights, radios, cellular phones, laptop computers. Task Force personnel are issued portable radios at the point of departure to a disaster and are responsible for that radio until the Task Force returns to the point of departure. The radios operate in the 403-430 MHz range and are capable of penetrating structures and below grade environments (i.e. underground).

=== Technical support ===
Equipment used includes snake-like cameras, fiberscopes, sensitive listening devices, measuring devices such as laser rangefinders, strain gauges and levels; audio-visual equipment such as still and video cameras, LCD projectors; haz-mat equipment and support equipment for canines such as kennels, harnesses and sleeping pads.

=== Logistics ===
Equipment includes sleeping bags, cots, food and water, as well as cold weather gear, portable toilets, portable showers, safety equipment such as gloves, earplugs, kneepads, respirators and protective eyewear; administrative equipment such as office supplies and reference materials; equipment maintenance materials and Task Force members' personal gear.

== See also ==
- Emergency management
- Paramedics in the United States
- Search and rescue in the United States
- National Association for Search and Rescue
- Mountain rescue in the United States
