= Urban Search and Rescue California Task Force 1 =

FEMA Urban Search and Rescue Task Force based in Los Angeles, California

CA-TF1 Patch

Urban Search and Rescue California Task Force 1 or CA-TF1 is a FEMA Urban Search and Rescue Task Force based in Los Angeles, California and sponsored by the Los Angeles Fire Department.

Task Force 1 was established on April 4, 1993, when the Mayor of Los Angeles and the Los Angeles City Council authorized the Fire Department to enter into a Memorandum of Agreement with the California Office of Emergency Services (OES) and FEMA to sponsor a USAR Task Force.

CA-TF1 is one of six Task Forces that is Weapons of Mass Destruction (WMD) certified having received extensive training in responding to incidents involving chemical, biological or radiological agents.

When deploying, CA-TF1 can move its equipment in one of two ways. The first is to load the cache onto a military pallet for shipment via air. The second is over land via two 40-foot (12 m) semi-trailer trucks and a 24-foot (7 m) crewcab box van owned by the Task Force.

== Deployments ==
- September 11, 2001, terrorist attacks - Deployed to World Trade Center, New York City, New York for nine days of search around the South Tower debris pile.
- 2002 Winter Olympics, Salt Lake City, Utah - Deployed to Utah on standby in the event of a disaster or attack.
- Hurricane Katrina - Deployed to a Texas staging area.
- Hurricane Rita - Deployed to a Texas staging area.
- Hurricane Gustav - Deployed to a Louisiana staging area
- Hurricane Ike - Deployed to a Texas staging area
- Hurricane Harvey - Deployed to a Texas staging area.
