= Urban Search and Rescue California Task Force 7 =

Urban Search and Rescue California Task Force 7 or CA-TF7 is a FEMA Urban Search and Rescue Task Force based in Sacramento, California. CA-TF7 is sponsored by the Sacramento Fire Department.

== See also ==
- Sacramento Police Department
- Sacramento Metropolitan Fire District
