= Urban Search and Rescue California Task Force 2 =

FEMA task force in Los Angeles County

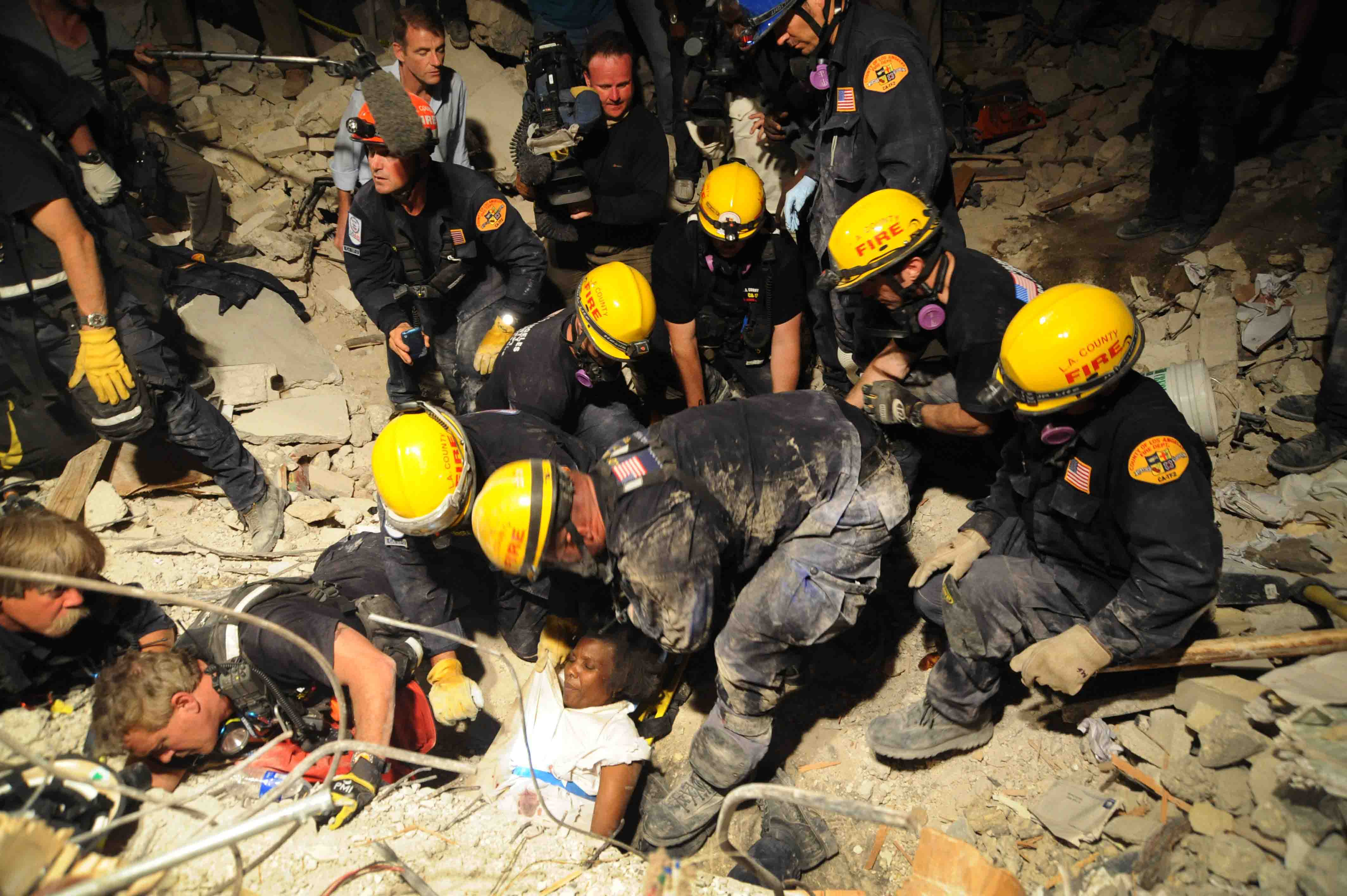
A woman is rescued alive from rubble by the CA-TF2 several days after the 2010 Haiti earthquake.

Urban Search and Rescue California Task Force 2 or CA-TF2 is a FEMA Urban Search and Rescue Task Force based in Los Angeles County, California. CA-TF2 is sponsored by the Los Angeles County Fire Department.

CA-TF2 is one of two Task Forces that works with the United States Agency for International Development’s Office of Foreign Disaster Assistance to provide international response to natural and man-made disasters.

== Deployments ==
- Hurricane Iniki, Kauai, Hawaii
- 1994 Northridge earthquake, Los Angeles County, California
- Oklahoma City bombing, Oklahoma City, Oklahoma
- 1996 Summer Olympics - Atlanta, Georgia
- September 11 attacks - New York, New York
- 2002 Winter Olympics, Salt Lake City, Utah - Deployed to Utah on standby in the event of a disaster or attack.
- Debris recovery of Space Shuttle Columbia disaster - February 2003
- 2003 Bam earthquake - December 2003
- Southeast Asia tsunami - Sri Lanka
- Hurricane Katrina - Deployed to New Orleans, Louisiana.
- Hurricane Rita - Gulf Region
- 2010 Haiti earthquake
- 2011 Christchurch earthquake, New Zealand
- 2011 Japan earthquake
- April 2015 Nepal earthquake
- 2023 Turkey–Syria earthquake
- 2026 Venezuela earthquakes
