= Urban Search and Rescue California Task Force 5 =

FEMA Urban Search and Rescue Task Force

CA-TF5 Patch

Urban Search and Rescue California Task Force 5 or CA-TF5 is a FEMA Urban Search and Rescue Task Force based in Orange County, California. CA-TF5 is sponsored by the Orange County Fire Authority.

CA-TF5 is one of six Task Forces that is Weapons of Mass Destruction (WMD) certified having received extensive training in responding to incidents involving chemical, biological or radiological agents.

Participating agencies in the Task Force are the Orange County Fire Authority, Orange Fire Department, Anaheim Fire Department (California).

== Deployments ==
- Northridge earthquake, Los Angeles County, California
- Oklahoma City bombing, Oklahoma City, Oklahoma
- Northern California Flood of New Year's Day 1997 - Napa, California; Yuba County, California
- Debris recovery of Space Shuttle Columbia disaster - February 2003.
- Hurricane Katrina
- Hurricane Rita
- Hurricane Gustav
- Hurricane Harvey
- Hurricane Florence
- Surfside Condominium Building Collapse
