= Urban Search and Rescue California Task Force 3 =

Urban Search and Rescue California Task Force 3 or CA-TF3 is a FEMA Urban Search and Rescue Task Force based in Menlo Park, California. CA-TF3 is sponsored by the Menlo Park Fire District.

CA-TF3 was created in September 1991.

NASA's Ames Disaster Assistance and Rescue Team (DART) based at the Ames Research Center near Mountain View, California is part of CA-TF3. This partnership provides CA-TF3 with access to cutting edge US&R technology and the Task Force often tests new technology for applicability to US&R.

== Deployments ==
- Hurricane Iniki, Kauai, Hawaii
- Northridge earthquake, Los Angeles County, California
- Oklahoma City bombing, Oklahoma City, Oklahoma
- Northern California Flood of New Year's Day 1997 - Napa, California; Yuba County, California
- September 11, 2001 attacks - Deployed to World Trade Center, New York City, New York
- Debris recovery of Space Shuttle Columbia disaster - February 2003.
- Hurricane Katrina
