= Fairfax County Fire and Rescue Department =

Operational area
- Country: United States
- State: Virginia
- County: Fairfax

Agency overview
- Established: 1949; 77 years ago
- Annual calls: 125,211 (2023)
- Employees: 1,510 Uniformed members 167 Civilian employees 355 Volunteer members
- Annual budget: $269,128,017 (FY 2025)
- Fire chief: John S. Butler
- IAFF: 2068

Facilities and equipment
- Divisions: 2
- Battalions: 8
- Stations: 39
- Engines: 66
- Trucks: 14
- Platforms: 8 Front line 1 Reserve
- Rescues: 8
- Ambulances: 70
- Tenders: 5
- HAZMAT: 3
- USAR: VA TF-1

Website
- Official website

The Fairfax County Fire and Rescue Department is a combination career and volunteer organization that provides fire suppression services, emergency medical response services, technical rescue services, hazardous materials Response services, water rescue services, life safety education, fire prevention and arson investigation services to Fairfax County, Virginia. Emergency medical services include advanced life support response by ALS (Advanced Life Support) capable engines and transport units.

== Metropolitan Washington Council of Governments ==
As part of the Metropolitan Washington Council of Governments, Fairfax County Fire and Rescue is labeled number 4 in the 800 MHz trunked radio system. All FCFR units begin with 4 followed by the station number. For example, the engine from station 19 is E419M, and the tower-ladder from station 1 is TL401M.

During an emergency that would require a response from multiple agencies, dispatchers are quickly able to identify what county a particular piece of apparatus came from. The "M" at the end of the unit designation represents an ALS capable unit (paramedic on board), which all Fairfax County Engines, Trucks, Towers, and Rescues are at optimal staffing levels. The "M" is not verbalized.

== Overview ==
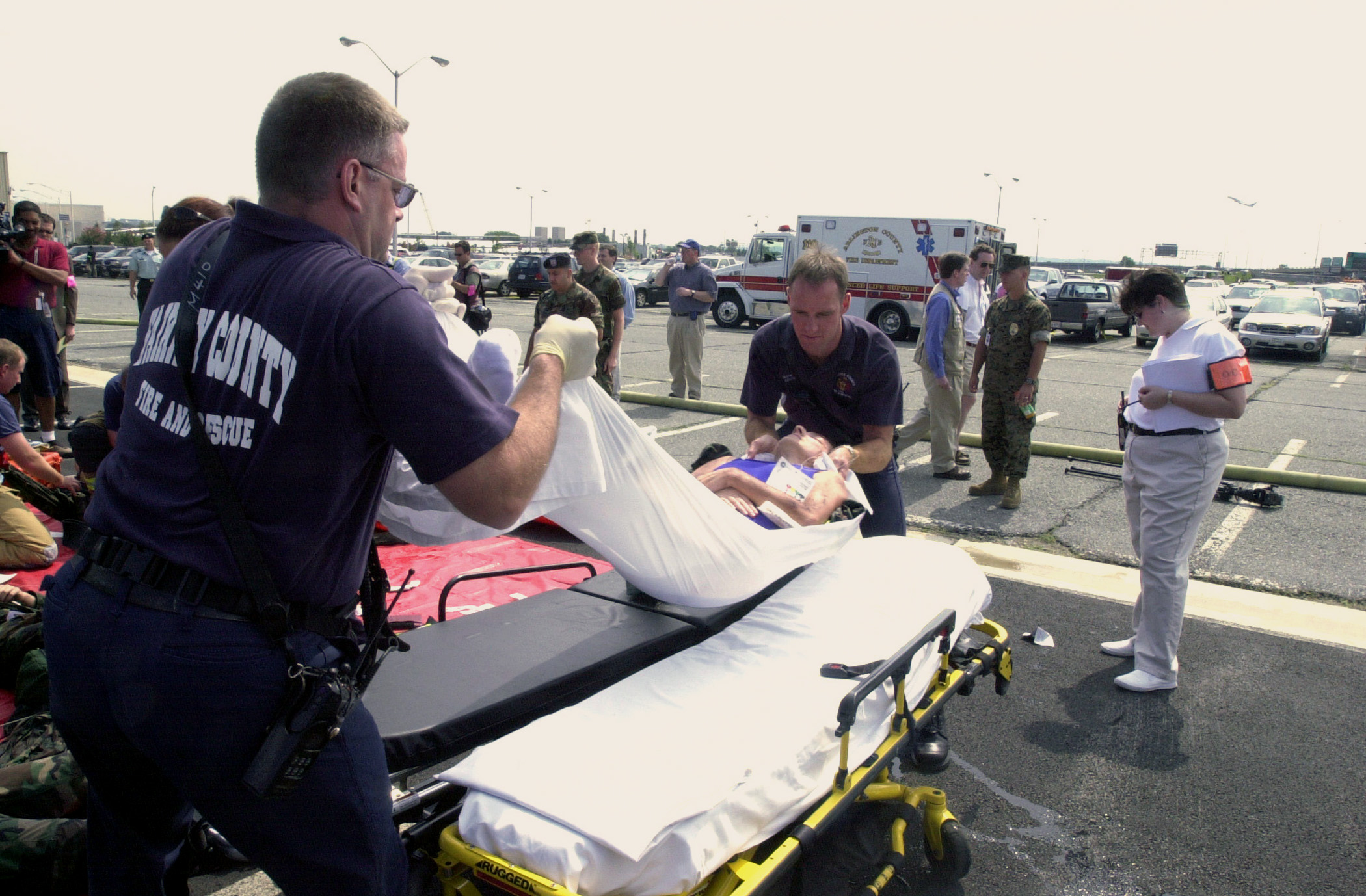
Fairfax County paramedics participate in an exercise at The Pentagon.

FCFRD consists of 39 fire stations spread out across the county's 407 square miles (1,050 km^{2}), serving a population of 1.15 million residents. With over 1,400 uniformed staff, 300 civilian employees, and 350 operational and administrative volunteers, the Fairfax County Fire and Rescue Department is the largest fire department in the Commonwealth of Virginia.

The Fairfax County Volunteer Fire and Rescue Association (FCVFRA) partners with the FCFRD to combine 12 volunteer fire and rescue departments in Fairfax County. Volunteers in these 12 departments are full partners with the career staff of the Fairfax County Fire and Rescue Department, providing emergency services in and around Fairfax County. These volunteers are trained to the same standards as career personnel and are involved in all aspects of the fire and rescue services from staffing ambulances and fire suppression vehicles to participating in domestic and international urban search and rescue.

As independent, nonprofit organizations, the volunteer departments own 8 of the 39 fire stations in Fairfax County and operate out of an additional 7 fire stations. Over 355 volunteer personnel placed units in service on 1,877 occasions, out of a total of 103,946 incidents countywide for FY2018.

== USAR Task Force ==
Fairfax County Fire and Rescue also sponsors one of the nation's Urban Search and Rescue response teams. Named 'Virginia Task Force 1,' the team is composed of approximately 200 specially trained career and volunteer fire and rescue personnel, with expertise in the rescue of victims from collapsed structures, following a natural or man-made catastrophic event. The team is composed of emergency managers and planners, physicians and paramedics and includes specialists in the fields of structural engineering, heavy rigging, collapse rescue, logistics, hazardous materials, communications, canine operations, and technical search. Virginia Task Force 1 has partnerships with the Department of Homeland Security/Federal Emergency Management Agency for domestic response and the United States Department of State during international missions. As a part of the Fairfax County Fire and Rescue Department, the task force maintains constant operational readiness as a local resource for residents of Fairfax County and surrounding jurisdictions.

== Stations and apparatus ==
● Almost all apparatus are considered career-staffed unless where marked by a 'V'.
● Accounts for the addition of the 8th Battalion in February 2021.
● Station 44 (Scotts Run) in McLean opened, and Rescue 401 became Rescue 444, both in August 2021.
● ALS Cars introduced January 2024 (3 units) placed among the County
● Accounts for the ALS to BLS conversion of certain career transport units at some fire stations (Annandale (8), Bailey's Crossroads (10), Great Falls (12), Chantilly (15), Clifton (16), Gunston (20), Reston (25), West Springfield (27), Fox Mill (31), Fairfax Center (40), Crosspointe (41), and Scott's Run (44)) in February 2022.
● Accounts for 2025 budgets cuts of Rescue Squad 419&21, and movement of other Rescue Co. and special units. Rescue Squads now numbered off of Battalion they are in

Fire Station Number	Locality	Fire Units				EMS Units		Battalion Management Units			Specialty / Historic Units
Fire Station Number	Locality	Engine Company	Truck Company	Tanker Company	Rescue Company	Medic Unit	Ambulance Unit	Battalion Chief Units	EMS Supervisor Unit	Safety Officer Units	Specialty / Historic Units
1	McLean	E	TL			X, V	V				UT401, Antique 1970 Peter Pirsch Engine
2	Vienna	E, V				X	V				UT402, BR402, Bike Team Trailer, Old Max Antique Engine
3	Fairfax	FE	TL			X		BC443			UT403, UTV443
4	Herndon	E				X					
5	Franconia	E, V	TL-Peak Staffing			X	V				UT405, BR405, VC405
7	Training Academy	E, E				X					CERT CAN (400,490), CERT Trailer, Foam Trailer
8	Annandale	E	TL			X	X, V				UT408
9	Mount Vernon	E				X	X		ALS402		BR409
10	Bailey's Crossroads	E	TT			X	X, V				
11	Penn Daw	E	T		R406(H)	X	X	BC406			
12	Great Falls	CAFS		X			X, V				SW412A, B, C, BSU, BR412, UT412, UT412B
13	Dunn Loring	E, V				X	V				UT413, REHAB 413
14	Burke	E, V				X	V, V				UT414, BR414, VC414, Foam414
15	Chantilly	E				X		BC403			BR415, MCSU415
16	Clifton	CAFS		X			X				BR416
17	Centreville	E, V				X	V		ALS403		UT417, CAN417, VC417
18	Jefferson	E			R404(T)	X		BC404	EMS403		TR404, CA400, SW404
19	Lorton	E				X	V	BC405	ALS404 (peak)		VC/UT419, MedCSU419, Foam Support Unit 419
20	Gunston	CAFS		X			X				FB420, FB420B, SW420, UTV420, BSU420
21	Fair Oaks	E, V				X	V	DC401		SAF402	UT421, VC421, TR-SW421
22	Springfield	E, V	T			X, V	V				CAN422, CAN422B, UT422, VC422
23	West Annandale	E					X				
24	Woodlawn	E	TL			X			EMS406		SHRU424
25	Reston	E	TT		R401 (T)	X		BC401			TR401, SW401, BR
26	Edsall Road	E			R408(H)	X		BC408			Foam426
27	West Springfield	E					X		EMS402		MAB427
28	Fort Buffalo	E					X				*LA423 (*Stationed here while 423 is under construction)
29	Tysons Corner	E	TT			X		BC402			
30	Merrifield	E	TT			X				SAF403	
31	Fox Mill	E					X		ALS 401		SHRU431
32	Fairview	CAFS				X					
33	Fairfax	RE				X					SW433, UT433
34	Oakton	E					X				MCP400
35	Pohick	E			R405(T)	X					TR405
36	Frying Pan	E	TL				X				LA436
37	Kingstowne	E					X,V	DC402		SAF401	Foam 437, LA437
38	West Centreville	E	T				X,V		EMS403		
39	North Point	CAFS		X		X					
40	Fairfax Center	E	TL		HAZMAT 401		X	BC407			HMSU401
41	Crosspointe	CAFS	T	X			X				UTV441
42	Wolftrap	CAFS		X			X		EMS401		UTV442, MCSU442, UT442
44	Scotts Run	E-Peak Staffing			R402-Peak Staffing		X				SICPO

Abbreviations:

- ALS - Paramedic Lieutenant
- BC - Battalion Chief
- DC - Division Chief
- EMS- EMS Captain
- PIO- Public Information Officer
- FE - Foam Engine
- RE - Rescue Engine
- R(H) - Hazmat Rescue
- R(T) - Technical Rescue
- V - Volunteer-staffed
- T - Truck Company
- TL - Tower Ladder
- TT - Tiller Truck
- UT - Utility
- CAN - Canteen Unit
- CAFS - Compressed Air Foam System Engine
- BR - Brush Unit
- VC - Volunteer Chief (Operational Volunteer Command Officer)
- SW - Swift Water Rescue (Inflatable Boat/Zodiac)
- BSU - Boat Support Unit
- FB - Fire Boat
- LA - Light and Air Unit
- REHAB - Rehabilitation Unit
- UTV - Gator Unit
- TR - Technical Rescue Unit
- TRS - Technical Rescue Support Unit
- MCSU - Mass Casualty Support Unit
- MedCSU- Medical Care Support Unit
- SAF - Safety Officer
- SICPO - Staffing Incident Command Post Officer
- HAZMAT - Hazardous Materials Unit
- HMSU - Hazardous Materials Support Unit
- SHRU - Special Hazards Response Unit
- MAB - Medical Ambulance Bus
- MCP - Mobile Command Post
- Lab 401 - Fire Marshal Mobile Lab Unit
- Foam - Foam Trailer/Truck

== Gallery ==
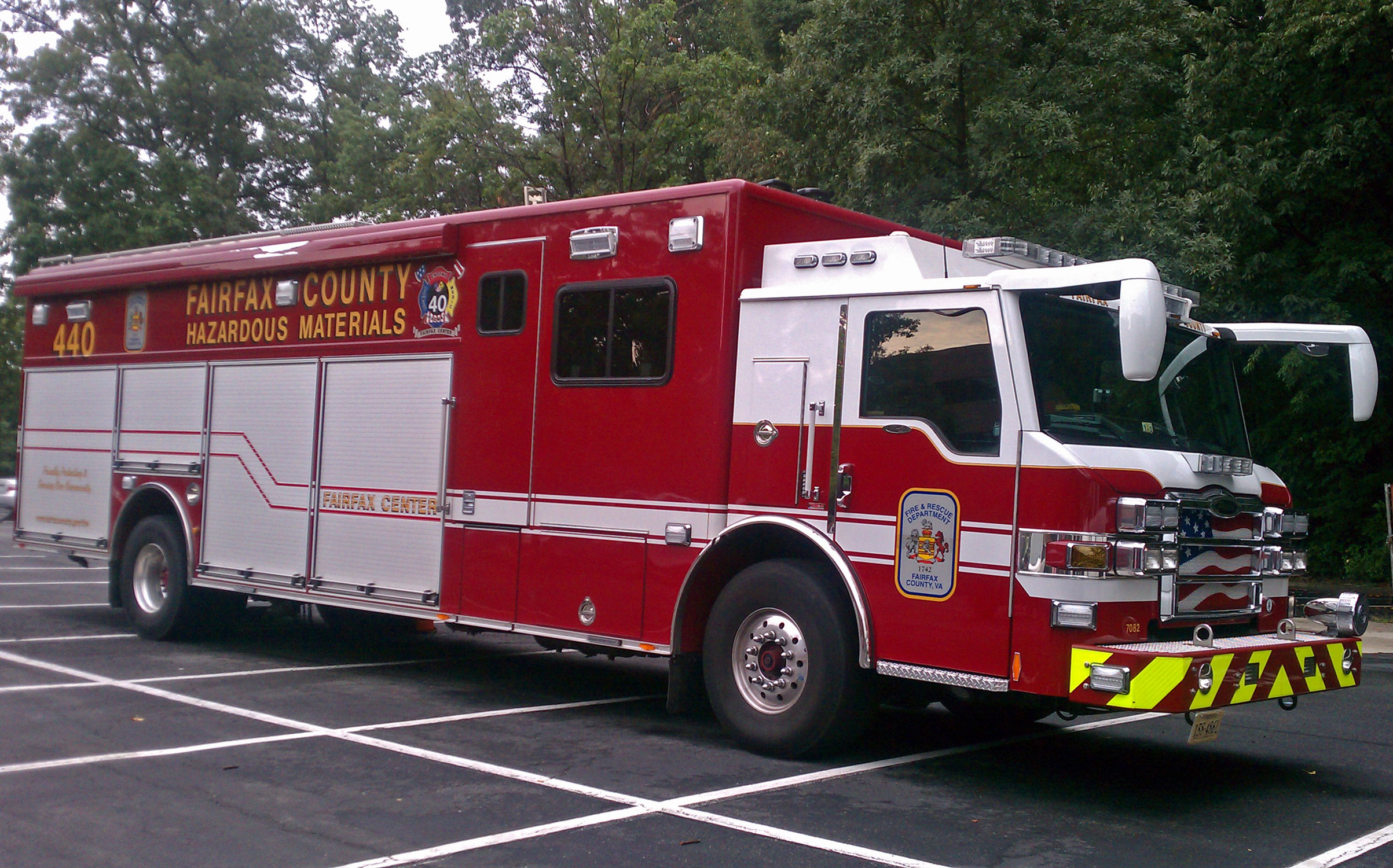
Hazmat truck 440

== See also ==
- ALS
- Fire Engine
- Metropolitan Washington Council of Governments
