= San Diego Fire–Rescue Department =

Government agency in San Diego, California

Operational area
- Country: United States
- State: California
- City: San Diego

Agency overview
- Established: August 5, 1889
- Annual calls: 183,350(2024)
- Employees: 1,256
- Annual budget: $343,491,249 (FY 2024)
- Staffing: Career
- Fire chief: Robert Logan
- EMS level: Advanced Life Support (ALS) and Basic Life Support (BLS)
- IAFF: 145
- Motto: "Dedicated to Our Citizens, Our Members, and Our Profession"

Facilities and equipment
- Battalions: 7
- Stations: 50 and 3 specialty facilities
- Engines: 50 - Front line 32 - Reserve
- Trucks: 13 - Front line 9 - Reserve
- Rescues: 2 Type 1 US&R apparatus 5 Airport Crash Rescue apparatus
- Ambulances: 39 contracted ALS units
- Tenders: 3
- HAZMAT: 3
- USAR: 2
- Wildland: 11 - Type 3
- Helicopters: 2
- Fireboats: 4 firefighting capable lifeguard vessels
- Light and air: 2

Website
- sandiego.gov/fire

The San Diego Fire–Rescue Department (SDFD) is the full-service fire department of San Diego, California, United States. It was established on August 5, 1889. The department responds to over 183,000 calls per year. It covers 343 square miles of service area, including 17 miles of coastline. It is the third-largest municipal fire department in California, after the Los Angeles Fire Department and Orange County Fire Authority.

== Organization ==
The San Diego Fire-Rescue Department is divided into two major divisions: Emergency Operations and Support Services. Each of these divisions are commanded by an assistant chief who oversees several subdivisions.

=== Operations ===
The San Diego Fire-Rescue Department Operations division oversees daily operations out of 50 fire stations, organized into seven battalions. Each Battalion is commanded by a Battalion Chief and daily operations are commanded by a Deputy Chief of Operations, known as a Shift Commander.

Additionally, the department operates a squad apparatus out of a specialty facility in the San Pasqual Valley area of the city. The department also operates a fire station responsible for San Diego International Airport.

=== Special operations ===
The San Diego Fire-Rescue Special Operations Division is commanded by a Deputy Chief that oversees multiple special programs including the Technical Rescue Team, Air Operations, the Metro Arson Strike Team (fire investigators), the Hazardous Materials team, the Explosive Ordinance Disposal Team, and the Special Trauma and Rescue (STAR/ SWAT medic) team.

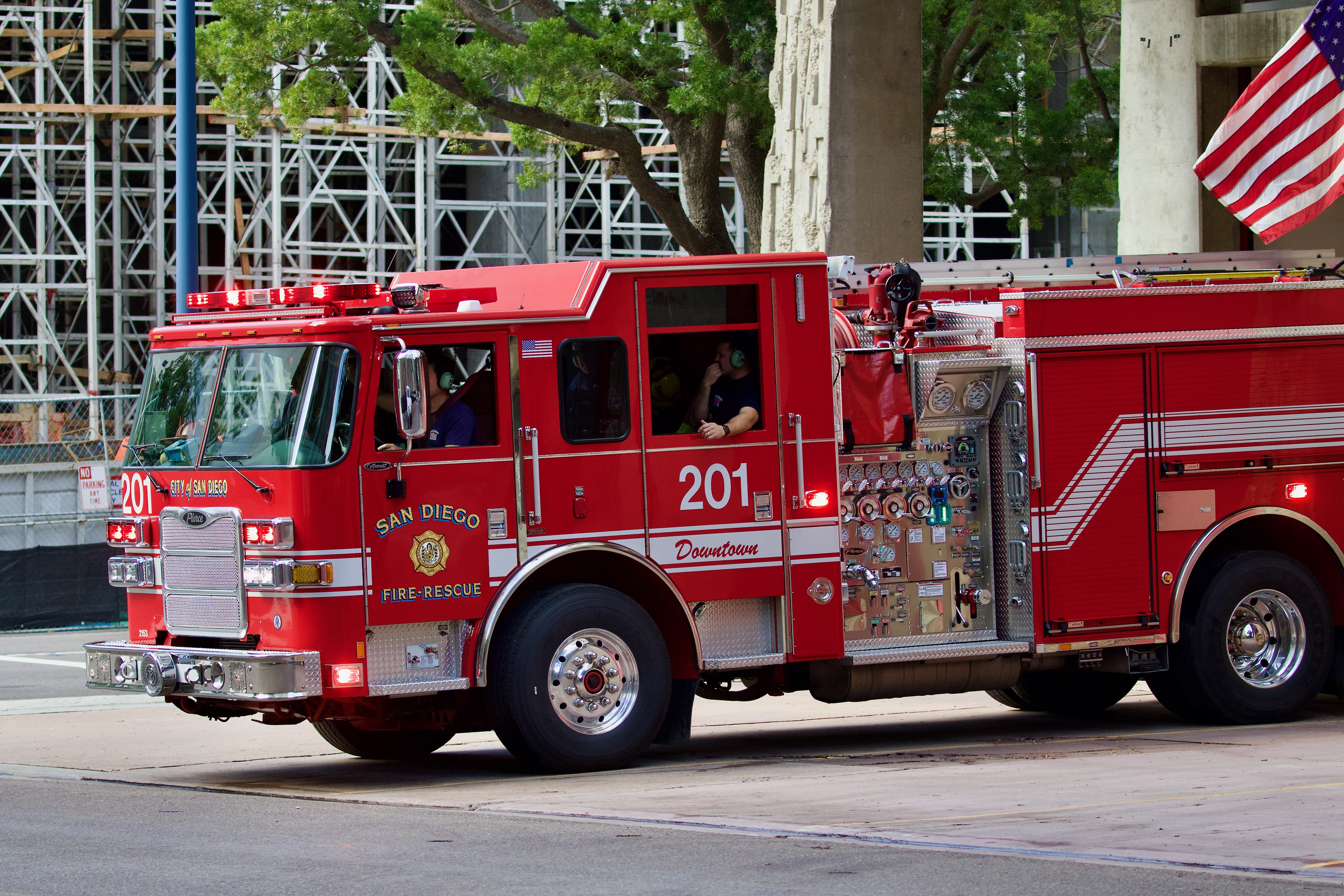
SDFD Engine 201 responding from Station 1

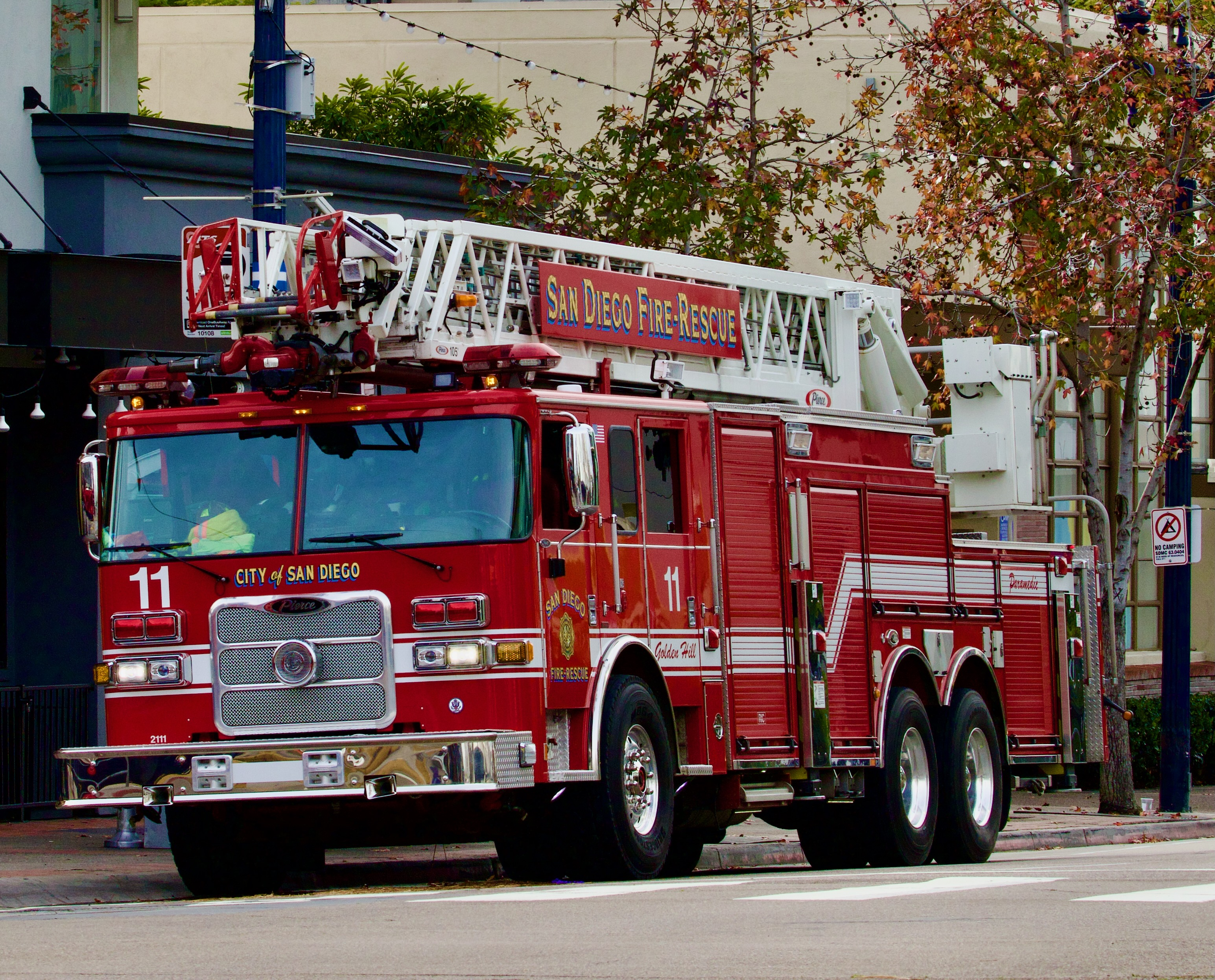
San Diego Fire Truck 11 on a call in East Village

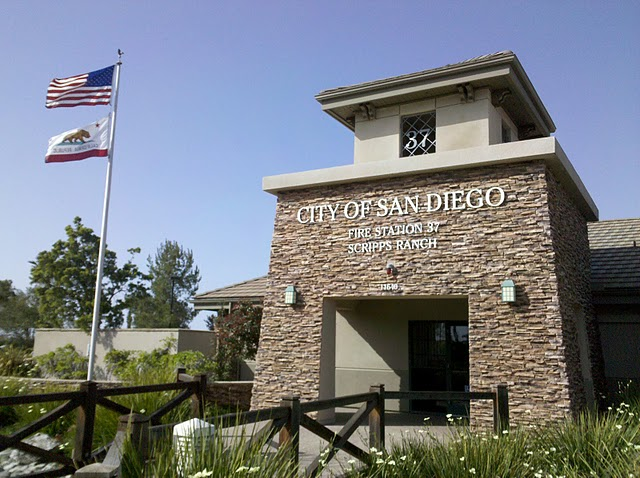
SDFD Fire Station # 37

=== Lifeguard services ===
The San Diego Lifeguard Service operates as a division of the Fire-Rescue Department and is commanded by the Lifeguard Chief. The Lifeguard division operates nine permanent lifeguard stations and several seasonal towers. The Lifeguard division performs water rescues, cliff rescues, EMS, and operates a Boating Safety Unit with several rescue vessels, some of which have firefighting capabilities.

=== Support services ===
The Support Services division oversees several subdivisions, including logistics, training and education, the Fire Prevention Bureau, communications, and fiscal/admin services.

== History ==
Before the formation of the San Diego Fire Department in 1889, San Diego's fire protection services were largely volunteer based. On May 17, 1869, the Pioneer Hook & Ladder Company was established with a budget of $250 and a volunteer staff of 50 people. By 1887, San Diego had two horse drawn steam fire engines, a hose wagon with 3,500 feet of hose, eleven horses and a large fire bell purchased for $500 (which is currently on display in front of Fire Station 1). However, up until this point, all fire companies within the city were still volunteer and largely unorganized.

In 1888, a series of disastrous fires occurred in the City of San Diego. In addition to these fires, the City of San Diego saw its population boom from 3,000 in 1880 to 30,000 by 1887. A new city charter was adopted in the spring of 1889 where a provision was made for the organization of a paid fire department. The control of this department was vested in a board of fire commissioners, appointed by the mayor. On August 5, 1889, San Diego established a paid, trained and organized fire protection service called the San Diego Fire Department. The newly formed San Diego Fire Department was led by Chief Engineer A.B. Cairnes. In 1894, Chief Cairnes developed and patented an aerial ladder to enable fire departments to rescue occupants from taller buildings in San Diego. The 60-foot, two-section wooden ladder was horse-drawn and was the first aerial ladder of its type in the United States. Fire departments in cities including San Francisco, Chicago, and New York subsequently purchased the apparatus.

By 1917, San Diego had become the first major fire department on the West Coast to be totally mechanized. As a result, the last team of fire horses was turned over to the City Yards where they continued their service hauling trash wagons. Also in 1917, the San Diego Fire Department made world-wide publicity by using an “aeroplane” and the crew from Station 4 as the first aerial fire fighting unit. Ultimately the aircraft did not prove practical, but paved the way for continued progression with new ideas throughout the department.

In 1919, San Diego Fire Department made history once again by building the first gasoline powered fire boat in the world. This boat, named the “Bill Ketner” was built by the Firemen assigned to Station 6, which is now the Fire House Museum. The fire boat had the ability to pump ten powerful hose streams and had two deck guns.

This decade also brought about several firsts for minorities in the San Diego Fire Department. In July 1918, Alfredo Salazar became the first Mexican-American Fireman hired by the department. One year later, history was made again by Timothy Augustus Williams, who became the first Black Fireman for the SDFD.

The Fire Department acquired a new central fire alarm station in June 1929, and generally speaking, good conditions prevailed into 1930. There were 206 Fire Department members and 32 pieces of fire equipment, assigned to 20 stations.

By 1933, the department, as did the city itself, felt the full effects of the depression. Three fire stations were closed (Stations 3, 10, and 12). Equipment was curtailed, new personnel was reduced, many members were retired, and the remaining members were placed on a part-time basis. Although the tough economic times prevailed, good editorials and the threat of higher insurance rates helped get the department back to normal by 1935.

During WWII, San Diego saw a major boom in population and building construction. Homes were being built on canyon rims throughout the city and were fast becoming a fire problem. In July 1942, and again, in September 1944, large wildland fires occurred, damaging or destroying several buildings.

San Diego enjoyed great post-war growth and the department expanded to serve this growth. By 1956, the department had 26 Engine Companies, 2 Truck Companies, 1 Fire Boat, 1 Patrol Boat, 25 Fire Stations and 416 Firefighters. Staff positions were also added, including a Training Officer and various Assistant Chiefs to aid in the training and administration of this “major city” fire department.

In 1951, Fire Chief Courser set forth another milestone for the Fire Department. At a time in our history of high racial tension across the country, Chief Courser issued a standing order that integrated the San Diego Fire Department. Prior to this, the African American firefighters were only permitted to work at station 19 at 35th and Ocean View Blvd. Chief Courser stated, “you will work side by side each other as one, if there was any man not willing to abide by this order then they should quit.” This change in department policy would lead to fairer and more competitive promotional process for minorities on the job.

In July 1969, due to increasing workload and responses being fielded by San Diego Firefighters, a need for more personnel was warranted. The 56-hour workweek and the three-platoon schedule as the department knows it today, was implemented. This new schedule resulted in an expansion of the Fire Department staff by approximately one-third, thus creating “C” Division.

In February 1979, Paramedic service began for the City of San Diego, provided by the medevac corporation. There were only three Paramedic units that were originally placed in the city, Medic-1, Medic-12, and Medic-17. Historically, ambulance service to the citizens of San Diego had been provided by the Police Department. There was very little emergency medical training for these officers and even less pre-hospital care given to their patients. It was not uncommon for one of these ambulances to pick up multiple patients from several locations on their way to the hospital.

July 1980 through August 1981, the SDFD trained and graduated all of its personnel as EMT's. This marked the start of a new modern day image as a fire department. No longer would SDFD just respond to fires and rescues, but medical aid responses would soon steer the department down a new but necessary path.

In 1992, the San Diego Fire Department was designated as the sponsoring agency for San Diego County's newly formed Urban Search and Rescue Task Force 8. It was also during this year when San Diego established a First Responder Paramedic-Engine program.

By 1993, the department had 15 fire engines designated as “Medic-Engines” utilizing a Firefighter/Paramedic. These 15 engine companies were selected based on their run volume and the extended response times by ambulances to their districts. The success of the Firefighter/Paramedic program soon became evident and set the groundwork for the future of the department.

In 1994, the city and department executed a lease with the U.S. Navy at the Camp Nimitz Naval Training Center in Point Loma. Due to the closure of the facility by the Navy, the Fire Department was able to establish its new training facility on the site. Prior to this, training was administered and conducted at numerous sites including Headquarters, Station 28, and Miramar College.

By 1998, sweeping change had come to the San Diego Fire Department. Due to restructuring of City Services, the Lifeguard Service was brought under the command of the Fire Chief, and a new controversial, yet one of a kind, EMS system had been created, known as the San Diego Medical Services Enterprise, eventually leading the department to make all of its engine and truck companies ALS level first responder units.

In 2024, SDFD opened Station 52 on the campus of University of California, San Diego. The new station is home to SDFD’s first electric fire engine with rapid charger.

== Companies/Apparatus ==
The San Diego Fire-Rescue Department operates several different types of companies with their assigned apparatus serving specialized functions.

=== Engine companies ===
The Type I Triple Combination Pump, or Engine Company, as it is most commonly referred to, is the backbone of the San Diego fire service.

The Engine Company is characterized by having hose, water, and a pump. SDFD Engine companies also carry an assortment of ground ladders, hand tools, and a limited complement of rope and power tools for forcible entry, rescue, and auto extrication.

SDFD Engine companies are staffed by four crew members: An officer (Captain), Driver (Engineer), and two firefighters.

An Engine Company's primary fire ground duties are to perform search and rescue, extinguishment of fires, assist with ventilation, salvage, and overhaul.

=== Truck companies ===
A Truck Company is tasked with rescue, raising ladders, ventilation, forcible entry, securing utilities among many other essential duties which support Engine Companies during the extinguishment of structure fires and emergency incidents. A truck company can be thought of as a giant mobile tool box with specialized equipment, ground ladders and a large aerial ladder with the ability to flow water from. SDFD operates a combination of rear-mount aerial apparatus and tractor-drawn aerial apparatus.

SDFD Truck companies carry a selection of ladders, including a mounted aerial ladder and a minimum of 163 ft of ground ladders. Truck companies also carry an assortment of hand tools, salvage and overhaul equipment, hydraulically powered rescue tools, high & low angle rope rescue equipment, ventilation fans, portable generators, lighting, chain saws, circular saws, and a variety of electric power tools and saws.

SDFD Truck companies are staffed by four crew members: An officer (Captain), Driver (Engineer), and two firefighters.

=== Urban Search and Rescue companies ===
Housed at stations 2 and 41, US&R companies are staffed by members of SDFD's Technical Rescue Team, and perform traditional responsibilities of a Heavy Rescue company. US&R companies respond to all greater alarm fires in the City of San Diego, and all High Rise alarms. US&R companies also respond to various rescues such as vehicle, swift-water, confined space, trench, structure collapse, vertical and other miscellaneous rescues. US&R apparatus have a pre plumbed hydraulic power unit capable of running Amkus and Hurst power tools and an on-board air compressor for air actuated tools.

=== Hazardous materials companies ===
SDFD has two Hazardous Materials apparatus, known as "HazMat" units. The department also maintains an additional apparatus provided by the California Governor's Office of Emergency Services. HazMat units are used to investigate and mitigate Hazardous Materials incidents, including weapons of mass destruction (WMD) city and countywide. These apparatus include a computer lab in the front cab and a chemistry lab in rear. HazMat units also carry Level A & B suits along with other specialized equipment to monitor and detect hazardous materials.

=== Brush apparatus ===
Type III - Engine Companies are commonly referred to as Brush Rigs, and are used primarily for wildland firefighting purposes. They are designed to perform such functions as off-road driving, mobile pumping (pump water while driving), and carry larger quantities of water. Type III apparatus are crossstaffed by personnel from an Engine or Truck company when requested or may be staffed full-time during extreme fire/weather conditions.

=== Water tenders ===
SDFD water tenders are capable of carrying 2950 gallons of water for refilling apparatus. They also have side spray, rear spray and a front bumper turrets. Housed at Stations 28, 29 and 40.

=== Light and Air ===
Housed at stations 1 and 40, Light & Air apparatus are used to provide additional lighting (mast and portable) and SCBA bottles for various incidents. These apparatus also have the ability to refill air bottles on scene via a cascade and compressor system as well as fill air bottles remotely via hose reels.

=== Foam tender ===
Foam 28 carries 400 gallons of Class A foam, 800 gallons of Class B foam, and a Compressed Air Foam System(CAFS). The main purpose of Foam 28 is to provide protection for the gasoline tank farm located in Mission Valley and at Montgomery Field, however it can be used for large structure fires and wildland hoselays.

=== Bomb Squad ===
Known as EDT/X-Ray 1, this apparatus is cross-staffed by Certified Bomb Technicians who are members of SDFD's Explosive Disposal Team. Carries a variety of tools to investigate and mitigate various explosive incidents including Drager Breathing Apparatus, Bomb Suits and a Bomb Disposal Robot. EDT personnel are also responsible for the departments Unmanned Aerial Systems (UAS) program, and will respond to greater alarm fires for aerial reconnaissance.

=== Helicopters ===
SDFD currently operates two helicopters, each staffed by 3 personnel: a pilot, crew chief, and rescue medic. SDFD's helicopters are based at Montgomery-Gibbs Executive Airport, and utilized county wide for Firefighting, Rescues and Medical Transport. SDFD's helicopters and crew are capable of night operations, equipped with night vision goggles, FLIR infrared cameras, and "night sun" spot lights.

- Copter 2, a Bell 412HP Twin Engine Type II Medium Lift Aircraft was Manufactured in 2008 and. Can carry up to 8 personnel, has a 375-gallon water tank, refillable in less than 25 seconds in as little as 18” of water, and 250 feet of hoist cable with a 600 lb capability.
- Copter 3, a Sikorsky S-70i FireHawk Twin Engine Type I aircraft, was manufactured in 2018 has a 1,000 gallon water tank refillable in approximately 45 seconds, and 250 feet of hoist cable with a 600 lb capability.
- Copter 4, a Bell 412epX Twin Engine Type I aircraft, was manufactured in 2024. It is the city's first helicopter powered by Bell Textron's Subaru engine option.

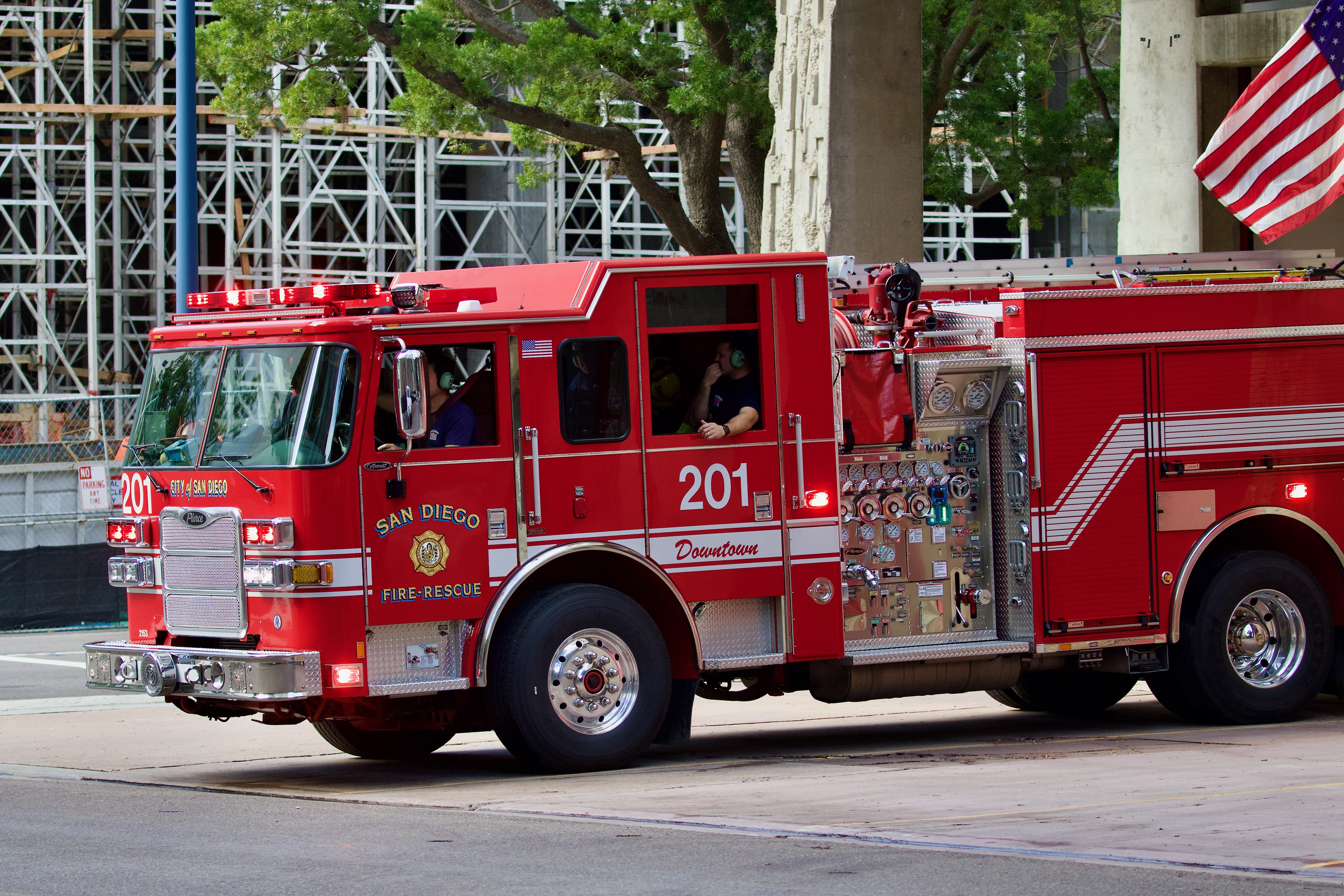

=== Command vehicles ===
SUVs or Pick-up trucks assigned to Battalion Chiefs, the Shift Commander, and other variations assigned to support staff and senior staff. These vehicles are used as a mobile command post during emergencies and carry a complement of radios, monitoring screens, maps, and various equipment for training and operations such as spare BA bottles, tools, BLS medical equipment and an ice chest.

== Stations and facilities ==
=== Specialty facilities ===
Location/Name	Address	Apparatus
Air Operations Base	4302 Ponderosa Ave.	Copter 2, Copter 3, Air Operations 1, Air Operations 2, Heli Fuel Tender 1 & 2
Emergency Command & Dispatch Center	3750 Kearny Villa Rd.	Communications 1

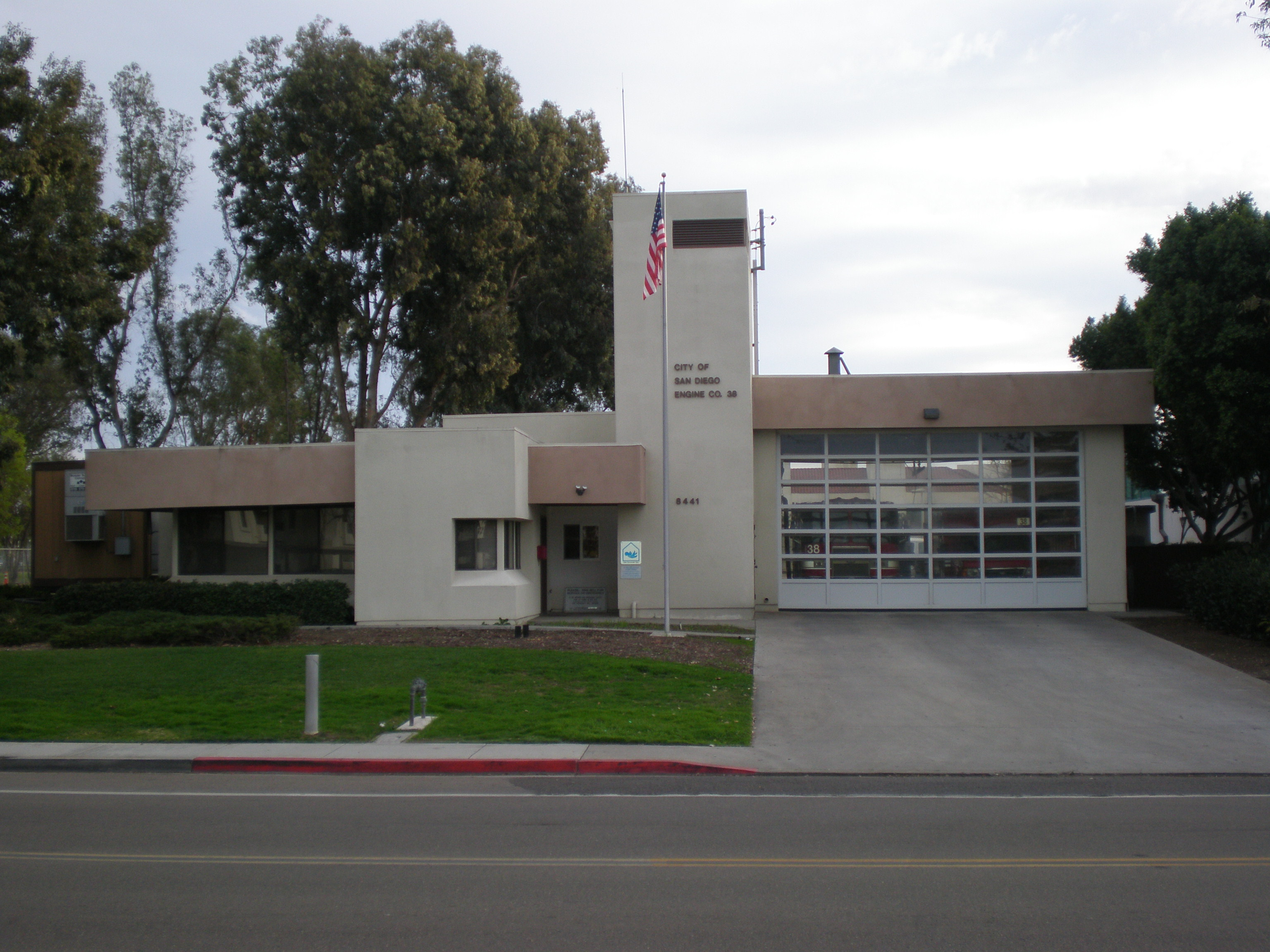
SDFD Fire Station # 38

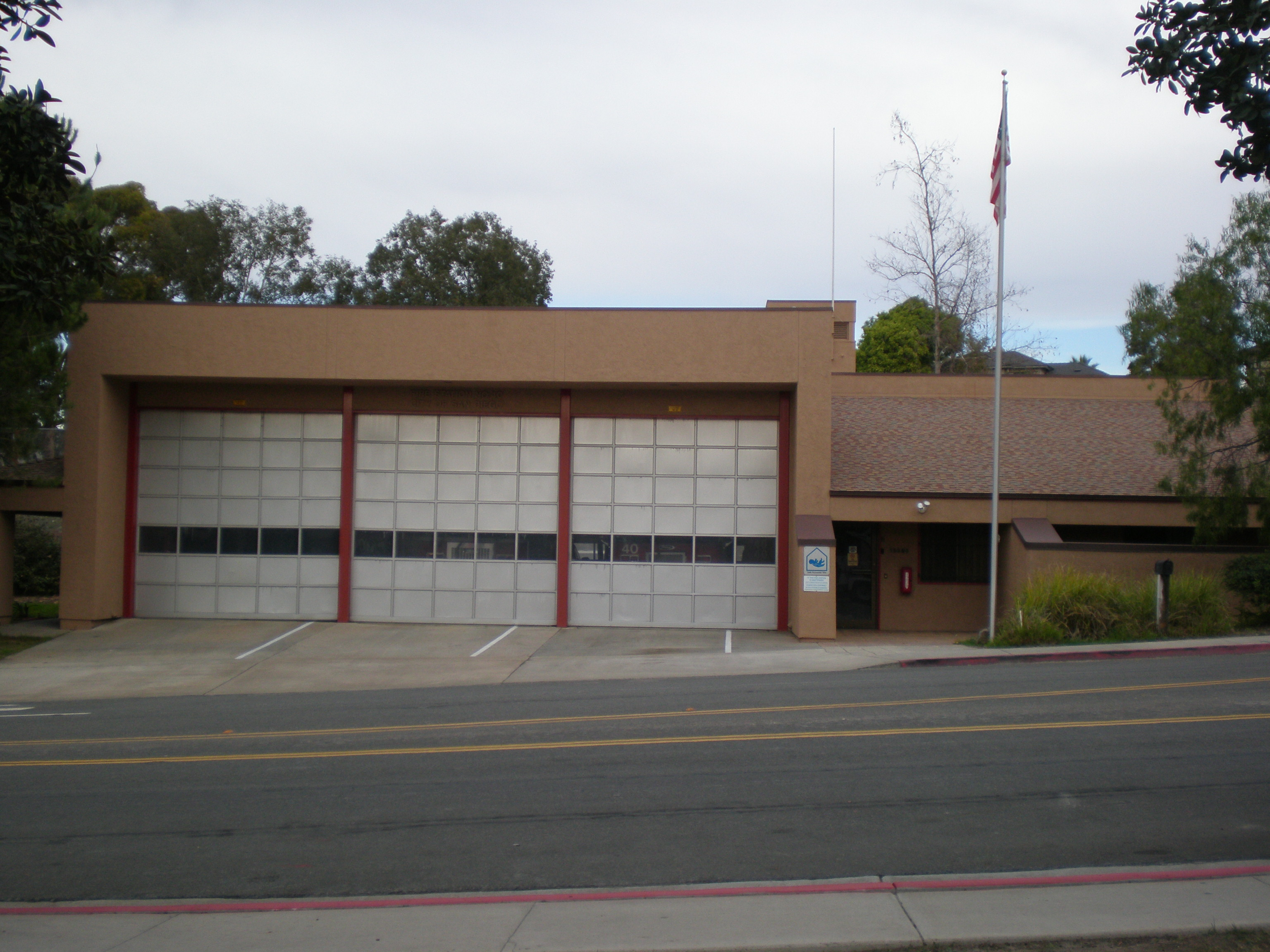
SDFD Fire Station # 40

=== Battalion 1 ===
Battalion 1 is responsible for the following Fire Stations: 1, 2, 3, 4, 7, 11 and the ARFF Station at San Diego International Airport. Battalion 1 is Headquartered at Fire Station 2.

Fire Station Number	Address	Engine Company	Truck Company	Medic Unit	Other units
1	1222 First Ave.	Engine 1, Engine 201	Truck 1 (tractor-drawn)	Medic 1	Light & Air 1, X-Ray 1, Chemical 1, USAR Utility 1, Utility 81, MAST Captain, MAST Engineer
2	825 West Cedar St.	Engine 2			Battalion Chief 1, USAR 2
3	725 West Kalmia St.	Engine 3			
4	404 8th Ave.	Engine 4, Engine 80		Medic 4	Mobile Operation Detail Trailer (MOD Trailer)
7	944 Cesar E. Chavez Pkwy.	Engine 7			
11	945 25th St.	Engine 11	Truck 11	Medic 11	
ARFF Station (SAN)	3698 Pacific Hwy.			Medic 63	Crash 1, Crash 2, Crash 3, Crash 5

=== Battalion 2 ===
Battalion 2 is responsible for the following Fire Stations: 5, 8, 14, 18, 23, 28 and 36. Battalion 2 is Headquartered at Fire Station 5.

Fire Station Number	Address	Engine Company	Truck Company	Medic Unit	Brush Unit	Other units
5	3902 9th Ave.	Engine 5			OES Brush Engine 6307	Battalion Chief 2
8	3974 Goldfinch St.	Engine 8				Chemical 8
14	4011 32nd St.	Engine 14	Truck 14		Brush 14	Shift Commander 1
18	4676 Felton St.	Engine 18		Medic 18		OES Engine 304
23	2190 Comstock St.	Engine 23		Medic 23		Utility 82
28	3880 Kearny Villa Rd.	Engine 28	Truck 28 (tractor drawn)	Medic 28		Foam 28 and Water Tender 28
36	5855 Chateau Dr.	Engine 36		Medic 36, Medic 236		

=== Battalion 3 ===
Battalion 3 is responsible for the following Fire Stations: 15, 20, 21, 22, 25 and 27. Battalion 3 is Headquartered at Fire Station 25.

Fire Station Number	Address	Engine Company	Truck Company	Medic Unit	Other units
15	4711 Voltaire St.	Engine 15			Utility 83
20	3305 Kemper St.	Engine 20	Truck 20 (tractor drawn)	Medic 20	Utility 20
21	750 Grand Ave.	Engine 21	Truck 21	Medic 21	
22	1055 Catalina Blvd.	Engine 22		Medic 22	
25	1972 Chicago St.	Engine 25			Battalion Chief 3
27	5064 Clairemont Dr.	Engine 27			

=== Battalion 4 ===
Battalion 4 is responsible for the following Fire Stations: 10, 17, 26, 31, 34, 39 and 45. Battalion 4 is Headquartered at Fire Station 45.

Fire Station Number	Address	Engine Company	Truck Company	Medic Unit	Brush Unit	Other units
10	4605 62nd St.	Engine 10	Truck 10		Brush 10	Chemical 10
17	4206 Chamoune Ave.	Engine 17		Medic 17		
26	2850 54th St.	Engine 26		Medic 26		
31	6002 Camino Rico	Engine 31		Medic 31		Mobile Canteen 2
34	6565 Cowles Mountain Blvd.	Engine 34				
39	4949 La Cuenta Dr.	Engine 39		Medic 39		
45	9366 Friars Rd.	Engine 45	Truck 45			Battalion Chief 4, HazMat 1, HazMat 2, ERT 1, OES HazMat 61

=== Battalion 5 ===
Battalion 5 is responsible for the following Fire Stations: 9, 13, 16, 24, 35, 41, 47, 50, and 52. Battalion 5 is Headquartered at Fire Station 50.

Fire Station Number	Address	Engine Company	Truck Company	Medic Unit	Brush Unit	Other units
9	7870 Ardath Ln.	Engine 9		Medic 9		UDC Trailer (Unified Disaster Counsel),
13	809 Nautilus St	Engine 13				
16	2110 Via Casa Alta	Engine 16				
24	13077 Hartfield Ave.	Engine 24		Medic 24	Brush 24	
35	4285 Eastgate Mall	Engine 35	Truck 35 (tractor drawn)	Medic 35	Brush 35	Utility 85
41	4914 Carroll Canyon Rd.	Engine 41		Medic 41		USAR 41, USAR Utility, Rapid Air Cushion(RAC)
47	6041 Edgewood Bend Ct.	Engine 47				
50	7177 Shoreline Dr.	Engine 50		Medic 50		Falck Medic Supervisor 72
52	10281 N Torrey Pines Rd.	Engine 52				Battalion Chief 5

=== Battalion 6 ===
Battalion 6 is responsible for the following Fire Stations: 6, 12, 19, 29, 30, 32, 43 and 51. Battalion 6 is Headquartered at Fire Station 12.

Fire Station Number	Address	Engine Company	Truck Company	Medic Unit	Brush Unit	Other units
6	693 Twining Ave.	Engine 6				
12	4964 Imperial Ave.	Engine 12	Truck 12 (tractor drawn)	Medic 12	Brush 12	Battalion Chief 6, Utility 86
19	3434 Ocean View Blvd.	Engine 19		Medic 19		
29	198 W. San Ysidro Blvd.	Engine 29	Truck 29 (tractor drawn)	Medic 29, Medic 229	Brush 29	Water Tender 29
30	2265 Coronado Ave.	Engine 30		Medic 30		
32	484 Briarwood Rd.	Engine 32		Medic 32		
43	1590 La Media Rd.	Engine 43		Medic 43	Brush 43	
51	7180 Skyline Dr.	Engine 51		Medic 51		

=== Battalion 7 ===
Battalion 7 is responsible for the following Fire Stations: 33, 37, 38, 40, 42, 44, 46 and quarters for Squad 57. Battalion 7 is Headquartered at Fire Station 44

Fire Station Number	Address	Engine Company	Truck Company	Medic Unit	OES Unit or Brush Unit	Other units
33	16966 Bernardo Center Dr.	Engine 33		Medic 33	OES Brush 6301	
37	11640 Spring Canyon Rd.	Engine 37		Medic 37	Brush 37	Falck Medic Supervisor 71
38	8441 New Salem St.	Engine 38		Medic 38		
40	13393 Salmon River Rd.	Engine 40	Truck 40	Medic 40	Brush 40	Light & Air 40, Water Tender 40, Utility 40
42	12119 World Trade Dr.	Engine 42		Medic 42		
44	10011 Black Mountain Rd.	Engine 44	Truck 44	Medic 44, Medic 244	Brush 44	Battalion Chief 7, Utility 87
46	14556 Lazanja Dr.	Engine 46				
Squad 57	17701 San Pasqual Valley Rd.					Squad 57

== Low staffing issues ==
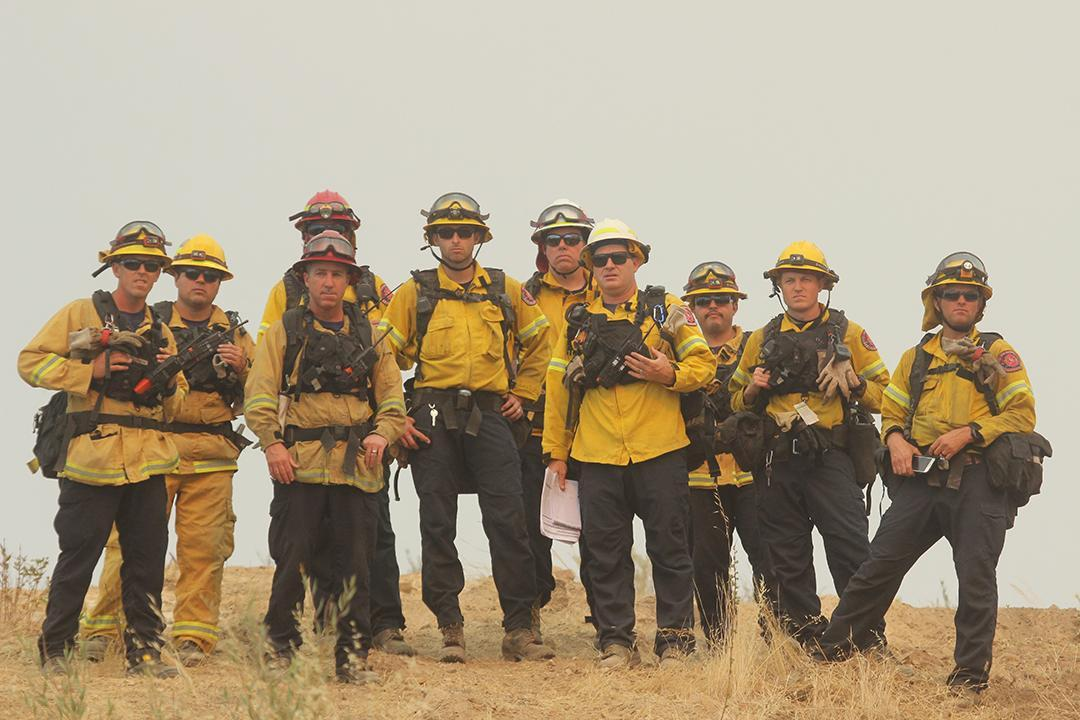
San Diego Engine Company Strike Team

The San Diego Fire Department is somewhat understaffed compared to comparable fire departments. For example, the fire department has about one firefighter per 1469 residents, compared to one fire fighter per 421 residents in San Francisco. In comparison with other major cities with populations over 1 million, such as Los Angeles.
