= PulsePoint =

Mobile phone application

PulsePoint Respond
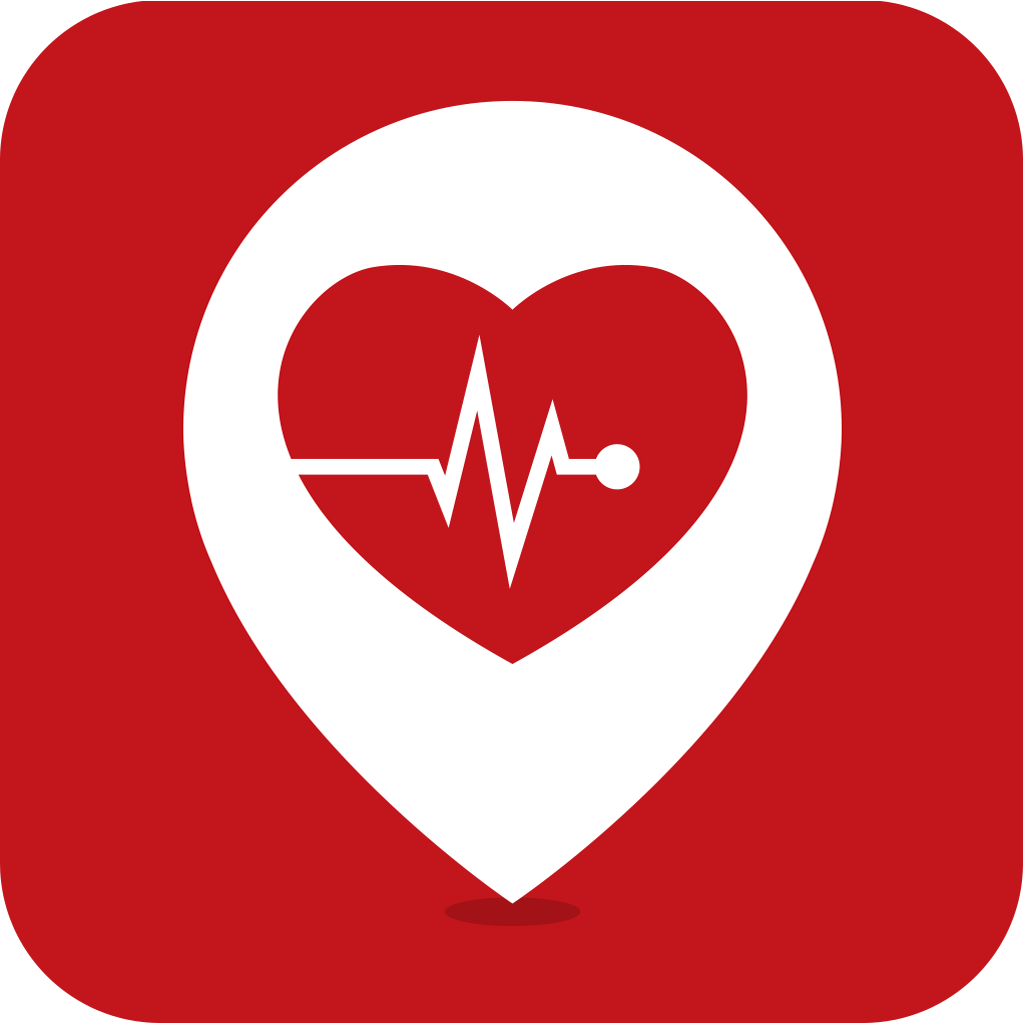
- Original author: Richard Price
- Developer: PulsePoint Foundation
- Release: 2011 (iOS); 2012 (Android)
- Available in: English, Spanish, French, Japanese, Greek
- Website: pulsepoint.org

PulsePoint is a 911-connected mobile app that allows users to view and receive live alerts of calls being responded to by fire departments and emergency medical services. The app aims to have bystanders trained in CPR help cardiac arrest victims before emergency crews arrive, which can increase their chance of survival. The app interfaces with the local government public safety answering point, and notifies nearby users of incidents in public spaces. In February 2017, PulsePoint introduced Professional Responder, a professional-tier version that alerts agency personnel to CPR-needed emergencies in residential settings while off duty, in addition to providing features for on-duty use. Based in the San Francisco Bay Area, PulsePoint is run by a public 501(c)(3) non-profit foundation of the same name. As of August 2026, the foundation reported that connected agencies had requested the assistance of 1,395,000 nearby responders for 393,215 cardiac arrest events.

In addition to Android and iOS, PulsePoint offers a web client at web.pulsepoint.org that allows users to view the same data that appears in PulsePoint Respond with a browser. PulsePoint uses a standardized set of incident types normalized across Public safety answering points (PSAP) and Computer-aided dispatch (CAD) system vendors. The foundation also underwrites the National Emergency AED + Resource (NEAR) Registry which provides centralized access to AEDs, naloxone, bleeding control kits and epinephrine.

In September 2018, the PulsePoint Respond app was approved by the First Responder Network Authority (FirstNet) and added to the App Catalog. PulsePoint Respond is a FirstNet Certified app.

== History ==
Richard Price, president of the PulsePoint Foundation, said that the idea for the application came to him in 2010 while he was serving as the fire chief in the San Ramon Valley, and witnessed a firetruck responding to a cardiac arrest while he was off-duty. Price was certified to perform CPR and had a defibrillator, which could have been useful if he had heard about the incident. The American Heart Association estimates that 383,000 out of hospital cardiac arrests occur each year in the United States.

In 2012 and 2013, PulsePoint was nominated for the Webby Award.Best Use of GPS or Location Technology. In 2014, the application was once again nominated, this time in the category of City & Urban Innovation.

== AED Registry ==
Along with the intention of getting CPR started faster and more often, a key objective of the PulsePoint Respond app is to inform those near a cardiac arrest event of the location of Automated External Defibrillators (AED) in the immediate vicinity of the victim. To accomplish this, the PulsePoint Foundation maintains the National Emergency AED + Resource (NEAR) Registry and encourages those who own or manage AEDs to contribute device locations. This crowdsourced AED location information is subsequently reviewed by local public safety agencies with support from the foundation. Approved AEDs are then shown to responders and dispatchers during cardiac emergencies via the NEAR Registry API. All aspects of the registry are provided free of charge.

On April 12, 2017, the PulsePoint Foundation announced a partnership with Priority Dispatch Corporation to allow dispatchers to inform callers of the location of nearby AEDs when the Medical Priority Dispatch System deemed them necessary. Additional emergency dispatch systems protocol vendors followed including APCO Intellicomm and Total Response. The NEAR Registry is FirstNet Certified for use in emergency communications centers in the United States.

In June 2019 PulsePoint extended the registry to include other collocated resources including naloxone (e.g., Narcan®) and epinephrine (e.g., EpiPen®), along with bleeding control kits. Beginning in August 2026, these resources could be registered at any location, paired with an AED or on their own.

== Concerns ==
Some privacy experts have expressed concern that the app may invade the medical privacy of victims. The Los Angeles County Fire Department, one of the many users of the app, has pointed out that The Health Insurance Portability and Accountability Act (HIPAA) protects the privacy of identifiable health information. Notifications only display an address and, possibly, name of a business.

Additional concerns have been raised that the app can cause too many bystanders to congregate at the scene of an emergency and that those responding via the app may not be trained in CPR or AED.

On May 9, 2018, the International Association of Fire Chiefs (IAFC) issued a Position Statement on PulsePoint.

== Features ==
Along with being able to view a list of calls in real time, users also have the option to listen in to radio traffic. During a CPR-needed response, this functionality allows citizen and off-duty rescuers to hear the dispatcher update emergency responders regarding patient location, scene conditions, etc. To facilitate the live feed, PulsePoint uses Broadcastify.

On December 11, 2018, PulsePoint released v4.1 for iOS that included the ability to override a device's Do Not Disturb setting and play an alert sound even when the device is muted for “CPR Needed” alerts. This required a special entitlement from Apple.

The application has an interface with Flickr that allows agencies to share photos through the app.

== Users ==
As of January 2024, the dispatch centers in more than 4,950 communities were connected to PulsePoint with over 3,000,000 users. Some of the most well-known agencies include:

- Akron Fire Department
- Alameda County Fire Department
- Albuquerque Fire Rescue
- Anaheim Fire & Rescue
- Anne Arundel County Fire Department
- Atlanta Fire Rescue Department
- Bloomington Fire Department
- Brevard County Fire Rescue
- British Columbia Ambulance Service
- California Department of Forestry and Fire Protection
- Chesapeake Fire Department
- Cincinnati Fire Department
- City of Casa Grande Fire Department
- Clark County Fire Department (Nevada)
- Cleveland EMS
- Columbus Division of Fire
- Coral Springs Fire Department
- District of Columbia Fire and Emergency Medical Services Department
- El Paso Fire Department
- Fairfax County Fire and Rescue Department
- Fort Lauderdale Fire-Rescue Department
- Frisco Fire Department
- Hawaii Fire Department
- Henderson Fire Department
- Hilton Head Island Fire Rescue
- Honolulu EMS
- Howard County Department of Fire and Rescue Services
- Kansas City Fire Department
- Kansas City Kansas Fire Department
- Kern County Fire Department
- Las Vegas Fire & Rescue Department
- Lincoln Fire & Rescue Department
- Livermore-Pleasanton Fire Department
- Long Beach Fire Department (California)
- Los Angeles County Fire Department
- Los Angeles Fire Department
- Madison Fire Department
- Marin County Fire Department
- Mecklenburg County, North Carolina
- Miami Beach Fire Department
- Milwaukee Fire Department
- Naperville Fire Department
- Norfolk Fire Rescue
- Orange City Fire Department
- Orange County Fire Authority
- Orange County Fire Rescue
- Orlando Fire Department
- Palm Beach County Fire Rescue
- Pasco County Fire Rescue
- Pittsburgh Dept. of Public Safety and Allegheny County Emergency Services
- Plano Fire-Rescue
- Portland Fire & Rescue
- Prince George's County Fire/EMS Department
- Prince William County Department of Fire and Rescue
- Rapid City Fire Department
- Reno Fire Department
- Richmond Fire Department (Virginia)
- Riverside Fire Department
- Sacramento Fire Department
- Sacramento Metropolitan Fire District
- Salem Fire Department
- San Bernardino County Fire Department
- San Diego Fire-Rescue Department
- San Francisco Fire Department
- San Jose Fire Department
- San Luis Obispo Fire Department
- San Ramon Valley Fire Protection District
- Santa Barbara County Fire Department
- Santa Clara County Fire Department
- Seattle Fire Department
- Seminole County Fire Department
- Sioux Falls Fire Rescue
- Sonoma County Fire District
- South Bend Fire Department
- South Metro Fire Rescue
- Spokane Fire Department
- Suffolk County Department of Fire, Rescue and Emergency Services
- Tualatin Valley Fire and Rescue
- Tucson Fire Department
- Ventura County Fire Department
- Virginia Beach Department of Emergency Medical Services
- Wake County EMS

== Incident Responder Unit Codes ==
Orange=Dispatched (?=Awaiting Acknowledge) Green=Enroute Red=On Scene (^=Available on Scene) Yellow=Transport Blue=Transport Arrived Gray=Cleared from Incident

The codes themselves are defined by each agency, and are typically followed by a number to identify a particular instance of each asset type. A legend is sometimes provided on the agency information page, and following are some common examples:

B=Battalion BC=Battalion Chief E=Engine CMD=Command CPT=Helicopter C=Crew DZR=Dozer HM=Hazmat ME=Medic Engine MRE=Medic Rescue Engine P=Patrol R=Rescue RE=Rescue Engine SQ=Squad T=Truck U=Utility WT=Water Tender
