= Coral Springs Fire Department =

Coral Springs Parkland Fire Department

Operational area
- Country: United States
- State: Florida
- City: Coral Springs

Agency overview
- Fire chief: John Whalen
- IAFF: 3080

Facilities and equipment
- Battalions: 1
- Stations: 8
- Engines: 6
- Quints: 1
- Ambulances: 8
- Tenders: 1

Website
- Official website
- IAFF website

The Coral Springs Parkland Fire Department (CSPFD) provides fire protection and emergency medical services to the city of Coral Springs, Florida. With a total of 8 stations, the CSPFD is also has a contract to serve the city of Parkland located just north of Coral Springs. Three of the CSPFD's 8 stations are located within the city of Parkland.

== USAR ==
The CSPFD is one of 24 departments that make up Florida Task Force 2 which is based in southern Florida. They are sponsored by the Miami Fire Department. The CSPFD has 18 members of the fire department on the Task Force with specialties ranging from confined space rescue to swift water rescue.

== Stations & Apparatus ==
| Fire Station # | Address | City | Engine Company | Ladder or Platform Company | Rescue Unit | Other Units |
|---|---|---|---|---|---|---|
| 42 | 6500 Parkside Drive | Parkland | Engine 42 | | Rescue 42 | |
| 43 | 4550 Rock Island Rd | Coral Springs | Engine 43 | | Rescue 43 | District Chief 43 |
| 64 | 600 Ramblewood Dr | Coral Springs | Engine 64 | | Rescue 64 | |
| 71 | 11800 NW 41st St | Coral Springs | Engine 71 | | Rescue 71 | |
| 80 | 2825 Coral Springs Dr | Coral Springs | | Ladder 80, Platform 80 | Rescue 80 | Battalion 80 & Support 80 |
| 95 | 300 Coral Ridge Dr | Coral Springs | Engine 95 | | Rescue 95 | CERT 95 |
| 97 | 6650 University Drive | Parkland | | | Rescue 97 | Tanker 97 |
| 109 | 11601 Hillsboro Blvd | Parkland | Engine 109 | | Rescue 109 | |
