= Cleveland Division of Fire =

Emergency services in Ohio, US

Operational area
- Country: United States
- State: Ohio
- City: Cleveland
- Address: 1645 Superior Ave., Cleveland, Ohio 44114

Agency overview
- Established: April 19, 1863
- Employees: 774 (2018)
- Annual budget: 80,501,998 (2026)
- Staffing: Career
- Fire chief: Vince DiTeodoro (interim)
- IAFF: 93

Facilities and equipment
- Battalions: 5
- Stations: 26
- Engines: 23
- Trucks: 8
- Platforms: 3
- Rescues: 2
- Ambulances: 0
- HAZMAT: 1
- Fireboats: 2
- Light and air: 1

Website
- Official website
- IAFF website

The Cleveland Division of Fire provides fire protection and works with Cleveland EMS to provide emergency medical service to the city of Cleveland, Ohio. The department, which was founded in April 1863, is responsible for 82 square miles (210 km^{2}) with a population of over 390,000 people.

== Stations and apparatus ==
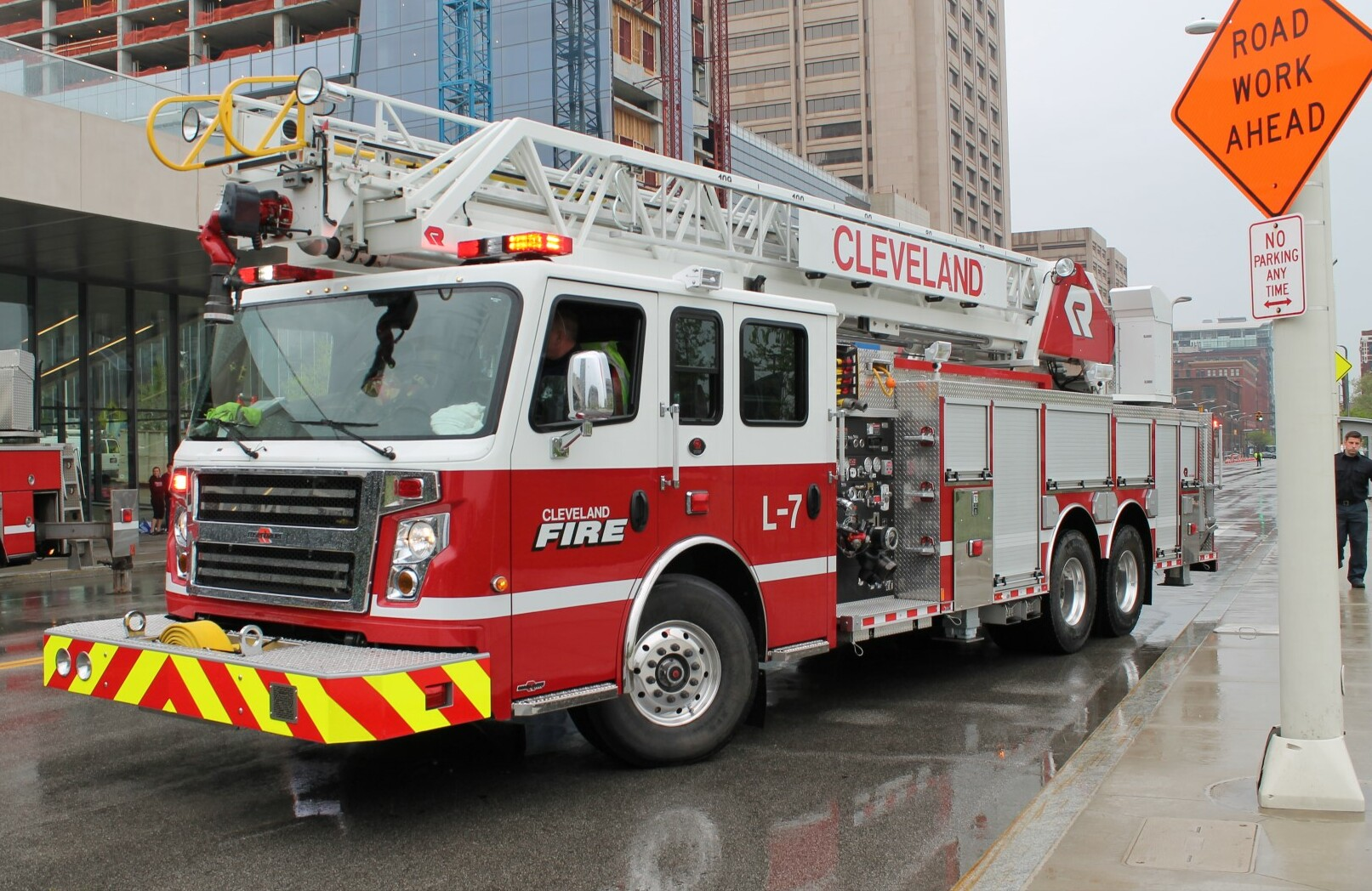
CFD Ladder Truck.

The Division of Fire operates out of a headquarters building at 1645 Superior Avenue, which was completed in 1974 at a cost of about $1.6 million.

As of May 2015 below is a complete list of all stations and apparatus operated by the Cleveland Fire Department.

| Station Number | Neighborhood | Engine Company | Truck Company or Tower Company | Rescue Squad Company | Special Unit | Chief Unit | Battalion |
|---|---|---|---|---|---|---|---|
| 1 | Downtown | Engine 1 | Ladder 1 | | Headquarters | Assistant Chief 1 | 2 |
| 4 | Ohio City | Engine 4 | Truck 4 | | | | 4 |
| 6 | Lee-Miles | Engine 6 | | | | | 5 |
| 7 | Downtown | Engine 7 | Ladder 7 | | HazMat 700, HazMat 701, HazMat 702 | | 2 |
| 10 | University Circle | Engine 10 | Tower 10 | | | | 5 |
| 11 | Slavic Village | Engine 11 | Truck 11 | | | | 2 |
| 13 | North Broadway | Engine 13 | | | B.E.A.M. Unit | Battalion 2 | 2 |
| 17 | League park | | | Technical Rescue 1 | | | 5 |
| 20 | Brooklyn Centre | Engine 20 | Tower 20 | | Blocker 1 | Battalion 4 | 4 |
| 21 | Tremont | | | | Fireboat | | 4 |
| 22 | St. Clair-Superior | Engine 22 | | | | | 6 |
| 23 | Cudell | Engine 23 | Truck 23 | | | | 3 |
| 24 | Clark-Fulton | Engine 24 | | | | | 4 |
| 26 | Kinsman | Engine 26 Engine 41 | | | | | 5 |
| 28 | Lorain - Carnegie | Engine 2 | | | B.E.A.R.S. | | 4 |
| 30 | Glenville | Engine 30 | Truck 30 | | | Battalion 6 | 6 |
| 31 | Collinwood | Engine 31 | Ladder 31 | | | | 6 |
| 33 | Halloran Park | Engine 33 | | Technical Rescue 2 | | Battalion 3 | 3 |
| 36 | Mount Pleasant | Engine 36 | Truck 36 | | | Battalion 5 | 5 |
| 38 | West Park | Engine 38 | | | | | 3 |
| 39 | Kamm's Corners | Engine 39 | Truck 39 | | | | 3 |
| 40 | North Shores | Engine 40 | | | | | 6 |
| 41 | Buckeye-Shaker | | | | | | 5 |
| 42 | Old Brooklyn | Engine 42 | | | | | 4 |
| 43 | Riverside | Engine 43 | | | | | 3 |

=== Disbanded companies ===
Since 2000, these companies have been closed:

- Engine 2 stationed at Fire Station 21 closed in 2011 and re-opened in 2017 at Station 28.
- Engine 17 closed in 2011.
- Ladder 9 closed in 2011.
- Ladder 17 closed in 2004.
- Ladder 42 closed in 2011.
- Battalion 1 stationed at Fire Station 17 closed in 2011.
- Rescue Squads 3 and 4 closed in 2013.
- Engine 21 Anthony J. Celebrezze (fire boat) is only staffed when needed by Engine 2 members.
