= Fullerton Fire Department =

Coordinates: 33°52′48″N 117°55′43″W

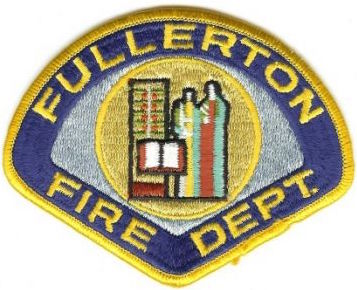

Operational area
- Country: United States
- State: California
- City: Fullerton

Agency overview
- Established: 1908
- Annual calls: 14,583 (2023)
- Employees: 112 (106 FTE, 6 PT)
- Annual budget: $29.1m
- Staffing: Career
- Fire chief: Adam Loeser
- EMS level: ALS and BLS
- IAFF: 3421

Facilities and equipment
- Battalions: 1
- Stations: 6
- Engines: 6 - frontline (ALS Type 1); 3 - reserve (Type 1) + 1 - OES (Type 1)
- Trucks: 1 - frontline (BLS); 1 - reserve
- Ambulances: 4 (BLS - city-operated); 3 - reserve
- Wildland: 1 - OES Type 3

Website
- Official website
- IAFF website

The Fullerton Fire Department is the agency that provides fire protection and emergency medical services for Fullerton, California. The department is responsible for an area of approximately 22 square miles (57 km^{2}) that has a population of just over 141,874 as of 2020.

== History ==
The Fullerton Fire Department was formally established as a volunteer department on August 10, 1908. The initial apparatus included a hand-drawn hook and ladder truck, a hand-drawn chemical wagon, and some ancillary equipment. In 1913 the voters passed a $5,000 bond issue, which was used to purchase the first piece of motorized apparatus, a 1913 Seagrave triple-combination (ladder, hose, and chemical) engine that was housed in rented quarters in the 200 block of North Spadra (now Harbor Boulevard). The city's first formal fire station was opened in 1926 in the 100 block of West Wilshire Avenue. This building housed the department's apparatus on the ground floor, while the second floor housed the city hall. In 1942, when a new city hall was built, the second floor of the Wilshire Avenue building was converted into sleeping quarters for the firefighters.

A second station was added at Brookhurst and Valencia in 1953 to serve the west side of the city, and a third was added at 700 S. Acacia to serve the east side of the city. By 1961 the department had made the transition from a volunteer department to one staffed by career firefighters. A bond issue passed in the mid-1960s funded the construction of a new fire department headquarters building at 312 E. Commonwealth. At that time the Wilshire Avenue station was leveled. The same bond funded the construction of a fourth station at 3251 N. Harbor Blvd. to serve the north-central part of the city, and a fifth station at 2555 E. Yorba Linda Blvd. to serve the rapidly growing east side of the city, which included the Cal State Fullerton campus.

A sixth station was opened at 1500 North Gilbert on the west side of the city in 1968. In 2004 this station was replaced by a new $3.4 million station that was built for the city by private developers as part of an agreement that allowed the developers to build on property owned by Chevron Land and Development.

On May 3, 2011 Fullerton and the Brea Fire Department from the adjacent city of Brea entered into an agreement to share the command structure of their respective fire departments. Under this agreement both shared a fire chief, three division chiefs (operations, fire marshal, and administration), and four battalion chiefs (BCs). Three were shift battalion chiefs, and one was the battalion chief in charge of training. The command structure sharing agreement, was estimated to save Fullerton $463,000 annually and Brea $881,000 annually. However, in 2022, the two cities ended the command-sharing agreement, and each city began to supervise its own fire department again.

In 2026, Fullerton launched a city-run ambulance program, ending its decades-long partnership with private ambulance provider Falck Mobile Health Corp., formerly Care Ambulance. Fullerton was among several Orange County cities (including Anaheim and Brea) that chose to bring ambulance operations in-house to achieve cost-savings and take advantage of ambulance billing revenue. The city purchased seven new ambulance units; three operate 24 hours per day, a fourth operates 12 hours per day, and the remainder serve as reserve units when the front-line ambulances are out for maintenance. The city hired 32 ambulance operators to staff the new units.

Also in 2026, Fullerton changed its fire department deployment model, adding a sixth paramedic engine to provide advanced life support-level care to station six’s district. Station six previously was home to the city’s 100-foot aerial ladder truck, which moved to headquarters station one as part of the redeployment. The aerial ladder truck previously resided at station one until 2018, when budget reductions forced the city to cut one fire engine, and the truck was moved to station 3 and then station 6 to cover for the missing engine. At station 6, the truck was located in the far northwest corner of the city, placing it far from the city center, where the majority of fire and rescue calls occurred that required a truck response. As a result, the city increasingly relied on neighboring jurisdictions when a ladder truck was needed in the city. The change also left the city’s busiest fire station, station one, with no back-up unit.

The 2026 redeployment was made possible in part by a $3.1 million federal grant. The Staffing for Adequate Fire and Emergency Response (SAFER) Grant will cover a portion of the enhanced staffing deployment for its first three years of operation.

== Metro Cities Fire Authority ==
The Fullerton Fire Department is part of the Metro Cities Fire Authority which provides emergency communications for multiple departments in and around Orange County. The call center, known as Metro Net Fire Dispatch, is located in Anaheim and provides 9-1-1 fire and EMS dispatch to over 1.2 million residence covering an area of 200 square miles (520 km^{2}). Other departments included in Metro Net include Anaheim Fire Department, Brea Fire Department, Fountain Valley, Huntington Beach Fire Department, Newport Beach Fire Department, Orange Fire Department and Orange County Fire Authority.

The Fullerton Fire Department also is part of the Orange County 800 MHz Countywide Coordinated Communications System. This system provides radio communications to law enforcement, fire services, public works departments, lifeguard, and marine safety services throughout the county. This system facilitates interoperability between units from different agencies, and makes possible a virtually seamless mutual aid system throughout the county.

Additionally, the Fullerton Fire Department is part of the county-wide automatic mutual aid system, which ensures that the nearest available fire and paramedic units are dispatched to a call regardless of the location. Fire departments throughout the county, including Fullerton, employ the incident command system routinely to coordinate resources during significant events. The automatic mutual aid system is used to dispatch resources from Fullerton and surrounding jurisdictions as needed in the event of a multiple alarm fire or other major emergency within the city. The automatic mutual aid system also is used to dispatch resources to incidents within the city when Fullerton units are unavailable owing to prior assignments, or for incidents occurring near the city limits in cases where the unit(s) from another jurisdiction can respond more quickly.

== Stations & Apparatus ==
The Fullerton Fire Department currently has six fire stations strategically located throughout the city.

Fire Station	Location	Engine Company	Truck Company	Ambulance Units	Other Units
1	312 E Commonwealth Ave	Engine 1 (ALS)	Truck 1 (BLS)	Ambulance 1 (BLS) Ambulance 21 (BLS - 8:00 AM - 8:00 PM)	Battalion 1 Reserve Battalion 1 Deputy 1 Deputy 2 Division 1 Prevention 1, 2, 3, 4 Utility 2 Reserve Engine 7 Reserve Engine 8
2	1732 W Valencia Dr	Engine 2 (ALS)			
3	700 S Acacia Ave	Engine 3 (ALS) OES Engine 1313 (Type 3 cross-staffed)		Ambulance 3 (BLS)	
4	3251 N Harbor Blvd	Engine 4 (ALS)			
5	2555 E Yorba Linda Blvd	Engine 5 (ALS) OES 386 (Type 1 - cross-staffed) ||			
6	2691 Rosecrans Ave	Engine 6 (ALS)		Ambulance 6 (BLS)	UTV-6 (cross-staffed) Utility 6 Reserve Truck 1 Reserve Engine 9

== Community Emergency Response Team ==
The Community Emergency Response Team for the city of Fullerton is sponsored by the Fullerton Fire Department. The Fullerton CERT is integrated into the command structure of the fire department. The team has its own volunteer command structure, which reports directly to the fire department battalion chief in charge of training. The team generally sponsors three training academies for the general public each year, which are open to those people over 18 years of age who reside or work in the city. Those persons who complete the training academy, which covers the standard, basic CERT training curriculum provided by the Federal Emergency Management Agency (FEMA) are eligible to become active members of Fullerton CERT provided that they successfully complete a fingerprint live scan and background check.

In the event of a major emergency that affects the city, Fullerton CERT is activated by the fire chief (or his designee).
