= Virginia Beach Department of Emergency Medical Services =

Virginia Beach Department of EMS
- Jurisdiction: City of Virginia Beach
- Total area (sq. miles): 310
- Dept. type: Volunteer Based
- Employees: 1100+
- BLS or ALS: ALS
- Chief: Jason Stroud
- Medical director: Dr. Stewart Martin, MD
- Responses: 45.899 (2016)
- Website: Official website

The Virginia Beach Department of Emergency Medical Services is the 911 EMS provider for Virginia Beach, Virginia. Virginia Beach is the largest city in the United States with a volunteer based EMS system. Since the 1940s Virginia Beach has offered free pre-hospital emergency services through 10 volunteer rescue squads supported by 1,100+ volunteers throughout the city. Virginia Beach EMS has also been a leader in a variety of pre-hospital technologies, including point-of-care ultrasound, 12-lead transmission, EZ-IO technology, therapeutic hypothermia, rapid sequence induction and intubation (RSI), video laryngoscopy, end-tidal CO_{2} monitoring, ST-elevation myocardial infarction (STEMI) and stroke programs, as well as community cardiopulmonary resuscitation (CPR), among others. These programs and more have contributed to the 36% cardiac arrest survival rate (2012).

== History ==
Beginning in the 1940s, the need for consistent pre-hospital care became apparent and independent rescue squads began providing coverage to various neighborhoods throughout the city. For example, in 1951 a car accident at 24th and Atlantic left a woman without care for more than an hour because the Fire Department's ambulance was out of service and the Army Base Fort Story was reluctant to respond to civilians, promoting the formation of the Princess Anne-Virginia Beach Rescue Squad, Inc. to ensure consistent ambulance coverage for oceanfront residents and visitors.

By 1972, the Emergency Coronary Care Program evolved to provide the first all volunteer Advanced Life Support EMS in the United States. By 1975, 10 independent rescue squads had been established throughout the city each serving their community. But as the call volume increased and technology evolved, the city government recognized the need to centralize the various independent rescue squads and an administrative office was established to oversee all of the rescue squads. In 1984, the City Manager along with the City Council recognized the need for more formal organization and oversight of the individual squads from a medical direction and operations oversight standpoint and created the Emergency Medical Services Division as an independent city agency. The Division of Emergency Medical Services became a full city department in 1990.

Through the 1990s, an increase in call volume and decrease in amount of volunteer Advance Life Support providers necessitated the Division of EMS to hire full-time paramedics to supplement staffing.

== Operations ==
Today, the Department of EMS supplements staffing with paid "career" Advance Life Support providers depending on staffing needs and specific events, who may be assigned a Zone Car or ambulance duty. The majority of ambulances throughout the city are staffed by Basic Life Support volunteer providers and should an emergency call require ALS, a Zone Car or Advanced Life Support ambulance is dispatched as well to provide that component.

Volunteer ALS providers can staff any and all units, including zone cars and ambulances at the need of staffing upon release from the Department of EMS and the medical director.

Virginia Beach Fire Department also has members who are Department of EMS released ALS providers, and during specific situations may assist volunteer rescue squads by providing ALS care.

In 2015, all firefighting and rescue operations were completely transferred from the rescue squads to the Virginia Beach Fire Department, including extrication and technical rescue operations. Up until that year, several rescue squads including Plaza and Virginia Beach maintained and staffed heavy rescue units and training for select members. VBFD gradually took over firefighting operations beginning in the 1970s from the volunteers when area call volumes exceeded the capabilities and staffing of the departments. Ambulances still respond to all rescue calls, including confirmed structure fires, hazardous materials, vehicle accidents, etc. Several of the rescue squads still maintain "Fire & Rescue" within their legal names for tradition or legal reasoning.

== Training ==
Virginia Beach Department of EMS is in charge of all initial and most continuing education training, though some rescue squads offer CEUs to their members.

After passing a background and criminal records check, prospective volunteers are enrolled in a "BLS Academy," which is held during nights and on weekends. Upon graduation, students will have the opportunity to choose a station to affiliate with and be eligible for National Registry certification.

Once certified and affiliated, members must "Intern" until comfortable and competent with local EMS protocols, policies, and procedures by being assigned to shifts as the third member of an ambulance and working under the guidance of qualified and released EMTs. Once the Intern has met the requirements for release (as provided by the Operational Medical Director), the member is allowed to work under general supervision as an "Attendant in Charge."

After meeting a minimum time (1 year released to general supervision) with no detrimental history, a member may submit an application to the Department of EMS for the Advanced EMT Academy and upon completion may sit for the National Registry AEMT exam. VBEMS also offers training scholarships for members who wish to apply to a Paramedic program. Paramedic training is done through contract with an outside vendor. An additional two years of service is required upon graduation at the level certified, but training is free to the member. Release to general supervision as an ALS provider differs from BLS providers, requiring an internship, quick response vehicle operations, and an oral board with members of the regional training committee, a Virginia Beach EMS officer and the Operational Medical Director prior to release.

Already previously certified BLS and ALS members may join the system and bypass the BLS Academy, but must complete an internship and skills verification prior to being released as an Attendant in Charge. All Virginia Beach EMS providers are required to maintain State of Virginia EMS certification at their appropriate level and the department also supports the member maintaining their National Registry certification if they choose to do so.

== Significant Events ==
=== 2004 Santa on the Air ===
The only program of its kind in the nation, a dedicated state inter-agency radio channel is obtained by Virginia Beach EMS and used for public safety members to contact Santa Claus, radio call sign "North Pole 1," and allows children who are involved at an emergency scene some comfort for the holiday by talking with Santa. The program is open for use by local agencies, including Virginia Beach EMS and its rescue squads, U.S. Navy, Fire, State Police and others. The program runs through midday December 25 and has found both large success and support.

=== 2018 Stop the Bleed Campaign ===
The City of Virginia Beach Emergency Medical Services (VBEMS) and Sentara are partnering to conduct free "Stop the Bleed" training classes to teach people how to stop uncontrolled bleeding in emergency situations until first responders arrive.

Every second counts when it comes to stopping a bleed. According to the American College of Surgeons, "Civilians need basic training in bleeding control principles so they are able to provide immediate, frontline aid until first responders are able to take over care of an injured person. Due to many situations, there may be a delay between the time of injury and the time a first responder is on the scene. Without civilian intervention in these circumstances, preventable deaths will occur."

=== 2018 PulsePoint Launch ===
Maintaining the community approach and roots of the department, the PulsePoint application was launched and the Community Paramedicine program was staffed with a chief officer to develop the program. PulsePoint is a free app that connects the EMS system with the community and the empowers CPR trained citizens in a crowd sourced app to be alerted about a nearby SCA event and lets them know the location of the closest AED. Once alerted they can start to administer CPR until First Responders arrive. Every second counts when it comes to administering CPR. The PulsePoint application provides citizens with the ability to make those seconds count.

The free partner PulsePoint AED app allows everyday citizens to precisely geolocate publicly accessible AEDs and adding business and descriptor information along with photos of the AED in context of its environment.

=== 2018 AHA Mission Lifeline Gold Plus Recognition ===
On May 11, 2018, Virginia Beach EMS received the American Heart Association 2018 Mission: Lifeline GOLD PLUS EMS Recognition Award at the Virginia Heart Attack Coalition (VHAC) State Meeting in Chesterfield, Virginia. Mission: Lifeline EMS Recognition recognizes EMS systems for their role in providing timely treatment for heart attack patients.

=== 2017 EMS Headquarters Building Dedicated ===
October 2017 EMS moved into its new Headquarters and Training Center located at 4160 Virginia Beach Boulevard. The two story building was the old Adult Learning Center purchased from the Virginia Beach City Public Schools.

=== 2016 Historic Leadership Changes ===
February 2016, Edward Brazle was appointed Interim Chief of the department with the retirement of the original manager of the 1970s Emergency Coronary Care Program and Director and Chief of the department, Bruce W. Edwards. In July 2016, Edward M. Brazle was appointed Chief of the department. Shortly afterwards, Jason Stroud and Tom Green were appointed Deputy Chiefs of the department. DC Stroud was appointed the Deputy Chief of Operations, and DC Green was appointed the Deputy Chief of Administration. Bruce Nedelka and Kevin Lipscomb were hired on as Division Chiefs to round out the Senior Leadership team at the end of the year.

=== 2004 Transition From All Volunteer to Volunteer-Based ===
In 2004, recognizing the ever increasing demand for 24/7 Advanced Life Support and the need for consistent operational oversight, the department hired the first career paramedics and supervisors in the city's history. These 24 paramedics and 4 brigade chiefs began supplementing the volunteers and ensuring minimal staffing was always available. As the city's call volume continued to grow, by 2016 the city expanded the career paramedics and supervisors to include 8 paramedics, 2 captains and 1 brigade chief per shift.

== Significant Incidents ==
=== 2012 Navy Jet Crash ===
On April 6, 2012, a "catastrophic mechanical malfunction" occurred in a Navy F/A-18D fighter jet causing the jet to crash into an apartment building in Virginia Beach. Ultimately 3 buildings were completely destroyed and 2 additional buildings were damaged. Virginia Beach EMS was the responsible for all EMS activities throughout the incident. On duty at the time of the crash were 13 ambulances, 5 paramedic zone cars and 3 supervisors, but the volunteer system enabled 30 ambulances to be staffed with 170 volunteers involved within 1 hour of the initial incident.

=== 2019 Courthouse Shooting ===
On May 31, 2019, a disgruntled employee shot and killed 12 people and injured 4 in a workplace shooting at the Princess Anne Courthouse municipal complex, located in the city of Virginia Beach and within the Princess Anne Courthouse Volunteer Rescue Squad's first due response area. Within minutes of the first report, ambulances were staged at the Courthouse fire station and multiple units including ambulances and EMS vehicles from Norfolk, U.S. military bases and other local areas were backfilling Virginia Beach EMS stations along with initiation of a Mass Casualty Incident.

After the shooting, Virginia Beach EMS along with local organizations offered support and counseling to volunteer and paid staff. Black ribbons were authorized to be worn on city IDs and over uniform badges. #VBStrong stickers were added to many public safety vehicles, including ambulances. Today, the Virginia Beach EMS department offers training on their response to new members as well as local public safety agencies to share lessons learned.

== Divisions ==
Virginia Beach EMS maintains an Operations Division and an Administrative Division to support the daily emergency medical operations across the City and its Departments. Chief Jason Stroud serves as the current Chief Operating Officer of the department.

=== Operations Division ===
The Operations Division is responsible for the daily operations department wide, as well as the various Special Operations Teams. Career paramedics may staff either ambulances or ALS quick response vehicles, depending on the staffing needs of the shift. Volunteers primarily staff ambulances, however they may be assigned to staff ALS zone cars if they meet the required qualifications. Career operations staff are assigned to one of 4 shifts which work 3 days on, 3 days off for 12-hour shifts. Each shift is overseen by a Brigade Chief and 3 Captains (EMS-2, EMS-3, and EMS-4). An additional supervisor, EMS-1, is staffed daily during peak demand hours. Deputy Chief Clay Cofer commands the Operations Division.

==== Special Operations ====
The special operations component of the operations division is primarily staffed by volunteers and functions as an adjunct to general pre-hospital operations. Current Special Operation Teams include the Bike Team, Marine Rescue Team, Marine Medic Team, SWAT Medic Team, Civil Disturbance Response Team, and the Special Response MCI Team.

===== SWAT Medic Team =====
The SWAT Medic Team is made up of selected career and volunteer paramedics who support the Virginia Beach Police Department's SWAT Team. SWAT Medics train and respond with their police counterparts and respond to all SWAT calls including high risk search warrants, hostage rescues, sniper attacks and barricaded suspect situations. Team members are required to pass bi-annual physical tests to maintain their status on the team.

===== Marine Rescue Team =====
The Marine Rescue Team is responsible for all water related incidents within Virginia Beach. The team maintains 5 boats strategically placed throughout the city, 2 quick response vehicles, and 2 jet skis. Team members qualify as boat crew members, boat coxswains, dive tenders, divers, rescue swimmers and vehicle operators. During the summer months, the team conducts weekend boat patrols on highly traffic waterways and beaches. They are one of seven nationally recognized by the United States Lifesaving Association as an Aquatic Response Team.

=== Administrative Division ===
The Administrative Division includes the main office, the EMS Training Center, the office of Continuous Quality Improvement, Human Resources, Oversight and Enforcement, the Departmental Evaluation Program, and the Infection Control and Compliance Program. Deputy Chief Amy Ward currently commands this division.

==== Training Center ====
The EMS Training Center is co-located within the EMS Headquarters Building at 4160 Virginia Beach Boulevard. The Training Center staff is led by a Brigade Chief, currently Chief Matthew Owens and includes four career paramedics assigned to training rotations and two instructor supervisors. The training center holds multiple BLS academies throughout the year, an annual Advanced EMT Academy, as well as BLS & ALS continuing education classes including ACLS, PALS, PHTLS, Difficult Airways, EVOC, CPR, EMS safety and more. The training division is responsible for all emergency medical training within the city.

== Programs ==
Virginia Beach EMS has long sought to be at the forefront of pre-hospital technology. Past and current innovative technologies utilized have included: Rapid Sequence Induction programs for qualified paramedics, therapeutic hypothermia, CPAP, surgical airways, BLS 12-lead EKG acquisition and transmission, Transport ventilators, Video Laryngoscope, EZ-IO drills for intraosseous access, BLS Narcan administration, Electronic EtCO2, Public access defibrillators, Mobile data terminals, Community vaccinations, STEMI programs, Medical friendly shelters, Community CPR classes.

Initiatives such as the STEMI Program have been validated through awards such as the American Heart Association's Bronze Mission Lifeline Award in 2015. Additionally, these programs have been contributed to the VB EMS cardiac arrest survival rate of 36%, which is more than three times national rate of 10.6%.

== In the Media ==
Virginia Beach EMS and several of the rescue squads have been featured in popular media, including news reports, documentaries and others.

- Rescue 911, a popular television program, featured Virginia Beach Volunteer Rescue Squads responding to calls during it Season 1, Episode 22 which aired on March 13, 1990. This episode can be viewed on YouTube.

== Volunteer Rescue Squads ==
- Virginia Beach Volunteer Rescue Squad
- Kempsville Volunteer Rescue Squad
- Plaza Volunteer Rescue Squad
- Courthouse Volunteer Rescue Squad
- Ocean Park Volunteer Rescue Squad
- Davis Corner Volunteer Rescue Squad
- Blackwater Volunteer Rescue Squad
- Creeds Volunteer Rescue Squad
- Chesapeake Beach Volunteer Rescue Squad
- Sandbridge Volunteer Rescue Squad
