= Anaheim Fire & Rescue =

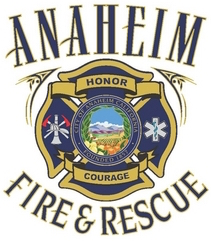

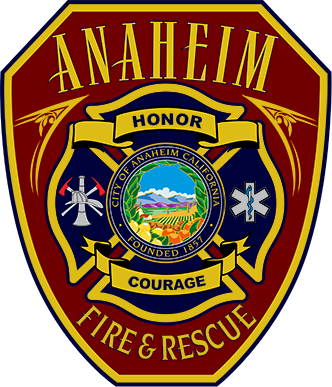

Operational area
- Country: United States
- State: California
- County: Orange
- City: Anaheim

Agency overview
- Annual calls: 30,744 (2014)
- Employees: 276 (2020)
- Staffing: Career
- Fire chief: Pat Russell
- EMS level: ALS, BLS
- IAFF: 2899

Facilities and equipment
- Divisions: 3
- Battalions: 2
- Stations: 11
- Engines: 11
- Trucks: 6
- Ambulances: 10
- HAZMAT: 1
- USAR: 1

Website
- Official website
- IAFF website

The Anaheim Fire & Rescue is the agency that provides fire protection and emergency medical services for the city of Anaheim, California.

== History ==
In 1857 the City of Anaheim was incorporated and the city's volunteer fire system was established. Initially the volunteer department consisted of twenty men. It wasn't until 1915 that the department purchased their first motorized ladder truck. At this time the Anaheim City Council authorized the employment of two full-time firemen. These two men worked 24 hours a day, seven days a week, and lived at the Anaheim Fire Station.

Volunteers continued to provide fire services until 1960, when the number of annual calls reached nearly a thousand and it was felt that the department should be made up of professionally trained fire personnel.

=== Metro Cities Fire Authority ===
Anaheim Fire & Rescue is part of the Metro Cities Fire Authority which provides emergency communications for multiple departments in and around Orange County. The call center, known as Metro Net Fire Dispatch, is located in Anaheim and provides 9-1-1 fire and EMS dispatch to over 1.2 million residents, covering an area of 200 square miles (520 km^{2}). Other departments included in Metro Net include Brea Fire Department, Fountain Valley, Fullerton Fire Department, Huntington Beach Fire Department, Newport Beach Fire Department, and Orange Fire Department.

== Stations and apparatus ==
Anaheim Fire & Rescue is divided into two battalions; Battalion 1 consisting of six fire stations, and Battalion 2 with five stations. All engines and trucks are full paramedic units, capable of providing advanced life support (ALS) treatment. All ambulances are basic life support (BLS). Engine 12 is temporarily located at station 10; however, in 2025, the city broke ground on a new fire station (station 12) in the Platinum Triangle area, in the parking lot of Angel Stadium. When the new station is complete, Engine 12 will move in.

Fire station number	Address	Engine company	Truck company	EMS Units	Wildland Units	Other units	Battalion
1	500 E. Broadway	Engine 1	Truck 1	Ambulance 1	Engine 301	Rehab 1 Safety 1	1
2	2141 W. Crescent Ave	Engine 2	Truck 2	Ambulance 2		USAR 2, RAC 2	2
3	1717 S. Clementine St	Engine 3	Truck 3	Medic 3 Ambulance 3 Ambulance 2–3	Engine 309	Light Air 3	2
4	2736 W. Orange Ave	Engine 4					2
5	2450 E. La Palma Ave	Engine 5		Ambulance 5 Ambulance 2–5	Engine 305	OES 1606 (Type 6 Patrol)	1
6	1330 S. Euclid Ave	Engine 6	Truck 6	Ambulance 6 Medic 6		Battalion 2 HazMat 6	2
7	2222 E. Ball Rd	Engine 7					1
8	4555 East Riverdale Ave	Engine 8	Truck 8	Ambulance 8 Medic 26	Engine 308 Patrol 601	Battalion 1	1
9	6300 E. Nohl Ranch Rd	Engine 9		Ambulance 9	Patrol 602, Water Tender 1		1
10	8270 E. Monte Vista Rd	Engine 12	Truck 10		Engine 310		1
11	3078 West Orange Ave	Engine 11		Ambulance 11		OES 414, OES 1311	2
