= Virginia Beach Volunteer Rescue Squad =

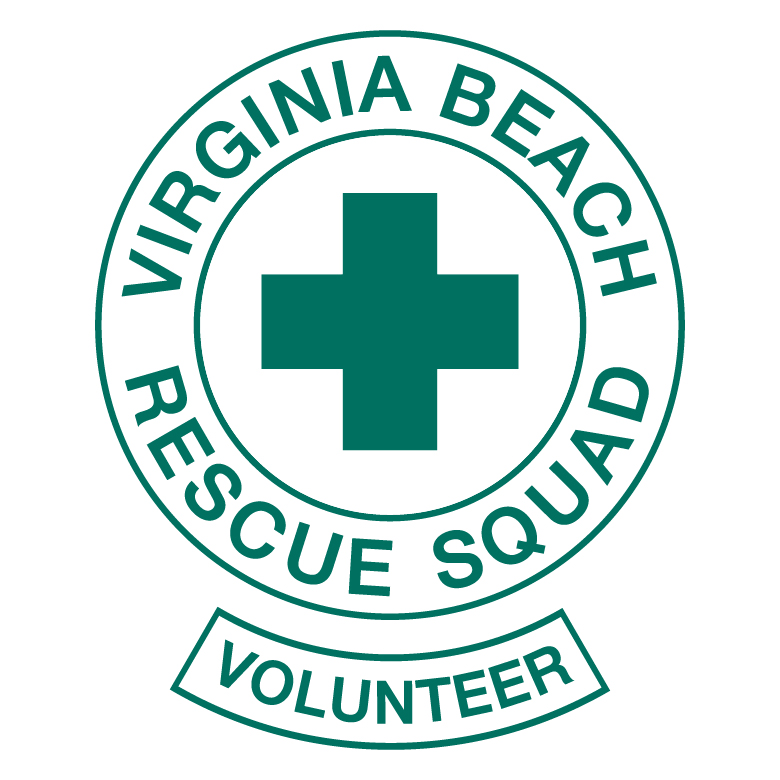
- Founded: May 1, 1952
- Purpose: Committed Leadership and Membership; Public and Private Investment; Continuous Education; State of the Art Equipment
- Location: Virginia Beach, VA
- Method: 10 Advanced Life Support-certified ambulances 1 Advanced Life Support-certified heavy response squad truck 2 Basic Life Support rapid-response carts
- Members: 200+

The Virginia Beach Volunteer Rescue Squad is one of the ten volunteer rescue squads of the City of Virginia Beach, Department of EMS, Emergency Medical Services that serves as the medical emergency response and rescue services agency to the citizens and visitors of Virginia Beach. This is the largest rescue squad in the largest all-volunteer based EMS system in the United States. Each rescue squad in the system is housed in a city-owned EMS/Fire station, with the exception of four privately owned rescue stations, including the two owned by VBVRS.

== Founding ==
The Virginia Beach Volunteer Rescue Squad started in 1952 after attorney J. Peter Holland III came upon a car accident at 24th street and Atlantic Avenue. He was unable to get the victim timely help because the fire department's ambulance was disabled. Holland gathered people in the community to start a volunteer rescue squad. The group took a trip to Fredericksburg, where they already had a working volunteer system. The group went to the city and received $500 to start the rescue squad. On May 1, 1952, Princess Anne-Virginia Beach Rescue started operations. In the 1960s, the city found the need for more rescue squads and requested the new squads operate within the fire departments. Virginia Beach-Princess Anne Rescue opted to remain its own independent squad. This squad is now known as the Virginia Beach Volunteer Rescue Squad or, unofficially, as Rescue 14. In the 1970s, more members were needed and for the first time, women were allowed to volunteer with the rescue squads.

== Membership ==
There are two types of members in Virginia Beach Volunteer Rescue Squad, with two distinct sets of responsibilities.

=== Operational ===
The operational members of VBVRS are Emergency Medical Technicians certified at every level (Basic, Enhanced/Advanced, Intermediate, and Paramedic) and are charged with responding to any medical emergency to which they are dispatched. Members typically staff VBVRS-owned ambulances, but may also staff Department of EMS zone cars depending on certification and citywide needs.

==== Duty Shifts ====
To remain active, operational members must run a minimum of 48 hours of ambulance duty each month. This is generally accomplished via four 12‐hour shifts that run from 6am to 6pm or vice versa, but some members opt to do other shift variations. Members are typically scheduled to run out of a VBVRS station, but ultimately serve the Department of EMS in general and may be sent to any part of Virginia Beach.

==== Standby Events ====
In addition to the mandatory shifts, VBVRS is often contracted to have a medical presence at various events throughout the City of Virginia Beach. These events include everything from races and community outreach events to concerts and exhibitions. Depending on the scale of the event, VBVRS may supply multiple ambulances and coordinate medical coverage across multiple agencies to ensure participant safety.

=== Support ===
The role of the support members is, in general, to support the day-to-day running of VBVRS and to meet any needs of the station that arise. Support members often help plan larger VBVRS events, such as the fund-raising Oyster Roast or Fund Drive, but also do much of the behind-the-scenes work that allows VBVRS to run smoothly and efficiently including vehicle coordination, supply management, office management and more.

== Leadership Organization ==
With over 200 active members, VBVRS has developed a tiered organizational structure to ensure adequate dedication of time to each facet of the organization, both operational and administrative. Executive Committee officers are voted in by the membership, and operational and support officers are appointed by the respective captains. An elected advisory board helps guide the direction of VBVRS. In addition to the positions listed below, sergeants may be appointed to assist with any aspect of VBVRS.

=== Executive committee ===
- Chief
- Treasurer
- Secretary
- Captain of Operations
- Captain of Administration
- Operational Life Member at Large
- Operational Member at Large
- Support or Operational Member at Large

== Stations ==
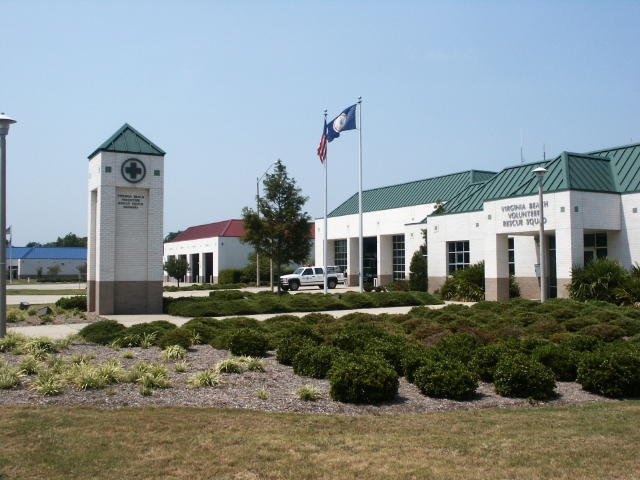
The current Station 14, the first building opened by VBVRS, located off of Virginia Beach Boulevard in Virginia Beach, VA

=== Station 14 ===
Since its founding, the Virginia Beach Volunteer Rescue Squad has operated out of a station located adjacent to the Virginia Beach Oceanfront to serve the tourists visiting the city as well as the residents. In November 1995, the Virginia Beach Volunteer Rescue Squad moved from 408 20th Street to 740 Virginia Beach Boulevard. This new state-of-the-art facility provides ample room for equipment, training, sleeping and exercise accommodations for members, as well as meeting rooms used for VBVRS functions and community activities. The garage at Station 14 has 8 bays, which is capable of housing five ambulances, beach ambulance carts, and the various support vehicles. Station 14 also serves as the base for the EMS Department EMS 2 Street Supervisor. Also, the rescue squad provides office space for the Virginia Beach Rescue Squad Foundation.

=== Station 8 ===
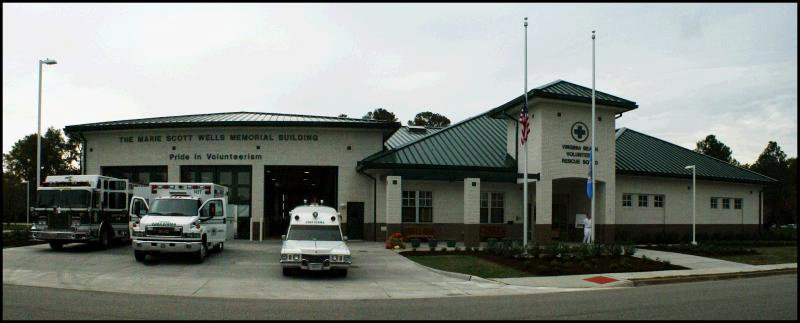
Station 8, the second building opened by VBVRS, located off of Old Donation Parkway near Virginia Beach General Hospital in Virginia Beach, VA.

In the late 2000s, as a result of private donations, VBVRS was able to finance the building and opening of this substation, Station 8. Like Station 14, Station 8 is a free-standing rescue squad, with all of the amenities included in Station 14. There are six bays in the garage at Station 8, which is capable of holding five ambulances in addition to a rapid response paramedic zone car, MCI Truck, and the 1972 Ambulance Caddilac.
