= Naperville Fire Department =

Operational area
- Country: United States
- State: Illinois
- City: Naperville

Agency overview
- Established: 1874
- Annual calls: 15,549 (2019)
- Employees: 202
- Staffing: Career
- Fire chief: Mark Puknaitis
- EMS level: ALS
- IAFF: 4302

Facilities and equipment
- Battalions: 2
- Stations: 10
- Engines: 6
- Trucks: 2
- Squads: 2(rescue-pumpers)
- Ambulances: 8(including spares)
- HAZMAT: 1

Website
- Official website
- IAFF website

The Naperville Fire Department (NFD) provides fire suppression and emergency medical services to the city of Naperville, Illinois, United States. The department is responsible for an area of 39.32 square miles (101.8 km^{2}) consisting of 149,540 residents as of the 2020 census. The Majority of sworn personnel are cross trained as Firefighters and Paramedics.

== Stations & Apparatus ==
The NFD has a total of 10 fire stations spread around the city.

Fire Station Number	Address	Engine Company or Squad Company	Truck Company	Medic Units	Other Units
1	964 E. Chicago Ave	Engine 1		Medic 1	TRT 1
2	601 E. Bailey Rd	Engine 2		Medic 2	
3	1803 N. Washington St	Engine 3		Medic 3*	
4	1971 Brookdale Rd	Engine 4		Medic 4	HazMat 4
5	2191 Plainfield Naperville Rd	Engine 5		Medic 5*	Battalion 2 Brush 5
6	2808 103rd St	Engine 6			
7	1380 Aurora Ave		Truck 7	Medic 7	Battalion 1 Water Rescue 7 MABAS 16 Air Unit
8	1320 Modaff Rd	Squad 8(rescue-pumper)			
9	1144 W. Ogden Ave	Squad 9(rescue-pumper)		Medic 9	Rescue 1
10	3201 95th St		Truck 10	Medic 10	

* Staffed from 8:30a-5:00p with power shifting personnel
