= Miami Fire-Rescue Department =

Fire department and ambulance service in the city of Miami

Coordinates: 25°46′43.43″N 80°11′28.59″W

City of Miami Department of Fire-Rescue
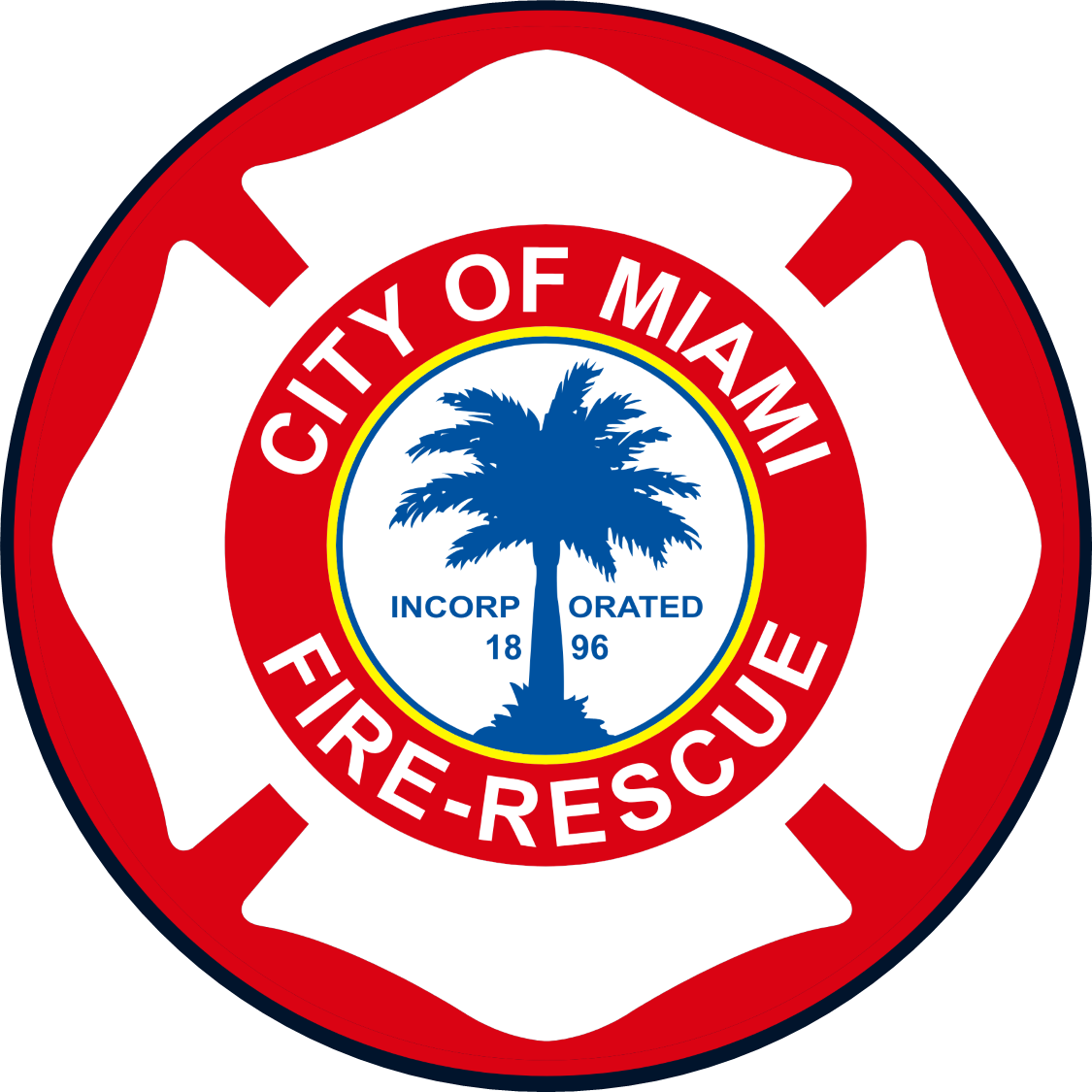

Operational area
- Country: United States
- State: Florida
- City: Miami

Agency overview
- Established: July 17, 1898
- Annual calls: 102,364 (2023)
- Employees: 907 (2023)
- Annual budget: $183,314,000 (2023)
- Staffing: Career
- Fire chief: Robert Hevia
- EMS level: ALS
- IAFF: 587
- Motto: "Excellence through Service"

Facilities and equipment
- Divisions: 3
- Stations: 15
- Engines: 13
- Trucks: 4
- Quints: 2
- Rescues: 26
- HAZMAT: 1
- USAR: 1
- Fireboats: 2

Website
- Official website
- IAFF website

The Miami Fire-Rescue Department, also referred to as the City of Miami Department of Fire-Rescue, provides fire protection and emergency medical services for the city of Miami, Florida. The department is notable for being the first in the nation to equip all apparatus with two-way radios, as well as being the first to use fog nozzles.

== USAR Task Force 2 ==
The Miami Fire-Rescue Department is the sponsoring agency for USAR Task Force 2, one of the two FEMA Urban Search and Rescue Task Forces in the state of Florida. The task force is a 210-member organization deploying teams of seventy rescue workers, search dogs, physicians and structural engineers who travel with 50,000 pounds (23,000 kg) of equipment to assist in major disasters. Some of their notable deployments include Hurricane Opal (1995), September 11 attacks at the WTC (2001), Hurricane Katrina (2005) and the 2010 Haiti earthquake.

== Stations & Apparatus ==
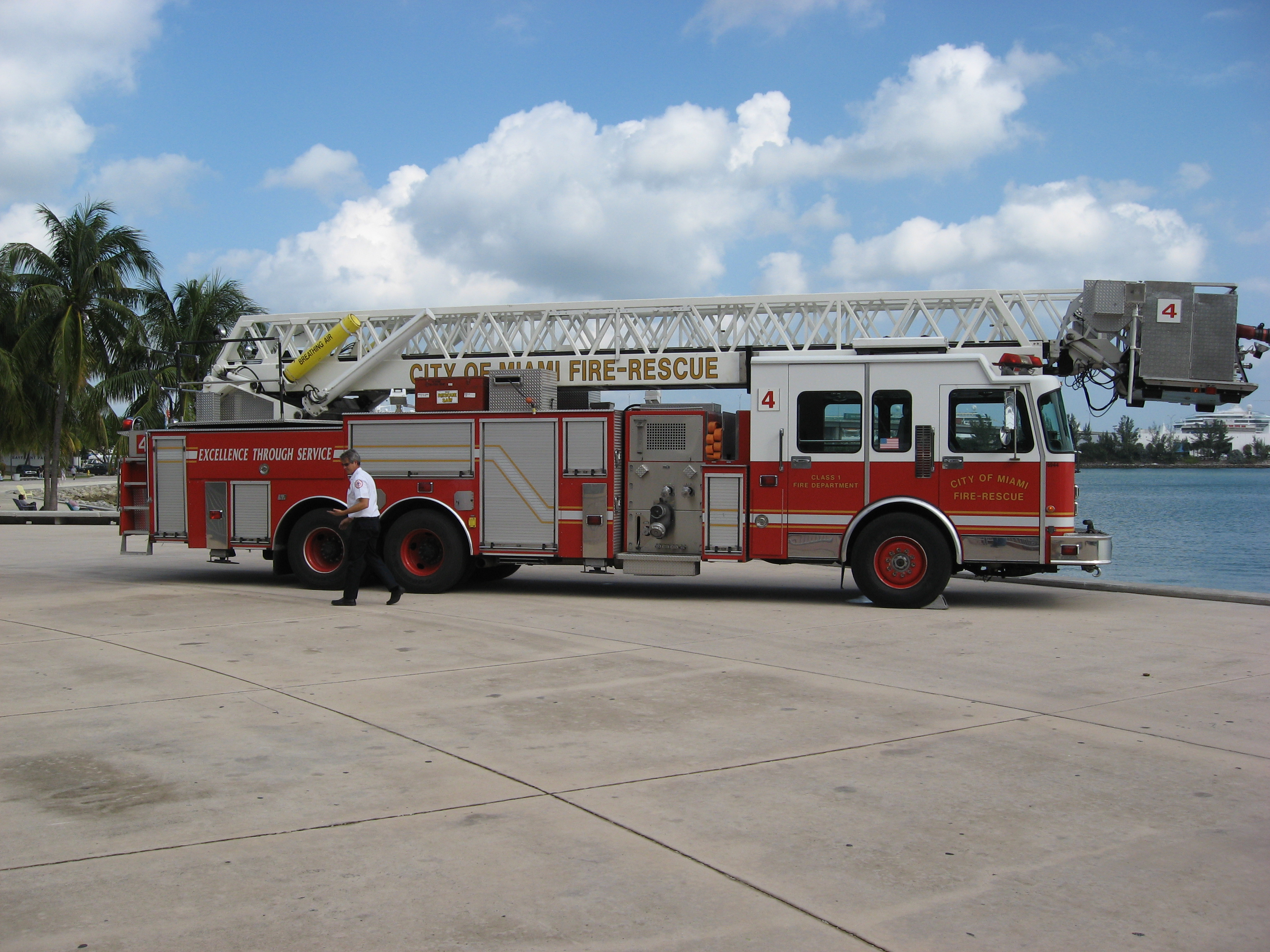
Fire truck

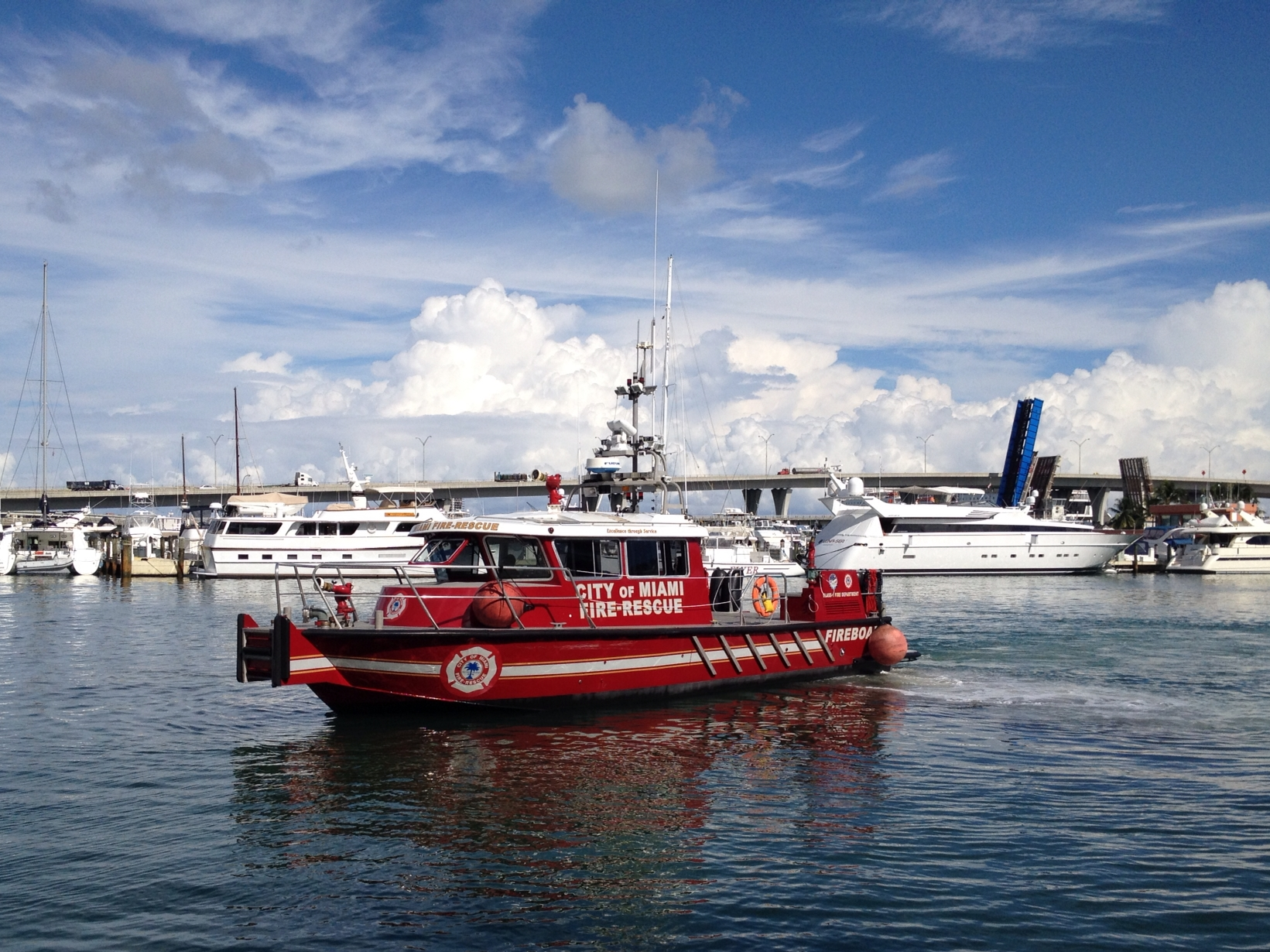
Fire boat

Fire Station Number	Station address	Engine Company or Foam Company	EMS Rescue Unit	Aerial Company or Quint Company	Other units
1	144 N.E. 5th St	Foam 1	Rescue 1 Rescue 21	Aerial 1	District Chief 1, HazMat 1, AirTruck 1, AirVan 1
2	1901 N. Miami Ave	Engine 2	Rescue 2 Rescue 22		Decon 2 Airbag 2
3	1103 N.W. 7th St	Engine 3	Rescue 3 Rescue 23		
4	1105 S.W. 2nd Ave	Engine 4	Rescue 4 Rescue 24	Aerial 4	Car 94 (EMS Battalion Captain)
5	1200 N.W. 20th St	Engine 5	Rescue 5 Rescue 25	Aerial 5	Dive Team 5
6	701 N.W. 36th St	Engine 6	Rescue 6 Rescue 26		Heavy Rescue 6 (TRT), District Chief 2, Car 95 (EMS Captain)
7	314 Beacom Blvd	Engine 7	Rescue 7 Rescue 27		District Chief 3 MedCat, Decon 7
8	2975 Oak Ave	Engine 8	Rescue 8 Rescue 28	Quint 8	Rehab 8
9	69 N.E. 62 St	Engine 9	Rescue 9 Rescue 29	Aerial 9	
10	4101 N.W. 7th St		Rescue 10; Rescue 20	Quint 10	
11	5920 W. Flagler St	Engine 11	Rescue 11 Rescue 31		
12	1455 N.W. 46th St	Engine 12	Rescue 12; Rescue 30		Decon 12
13	990 NE 79th St	Engine 13	Rescue 13		
14	3171 SW 22nd Ter	Engine 14	Rescue 14		
15	Bayside Market Place				Marine Operations, Fireboat 1, Fireboat 2
16	9 SE 6th St		Rescue 16		
