= San Luis Obispo Fire Department =

San Luis Obispo City Fire Department
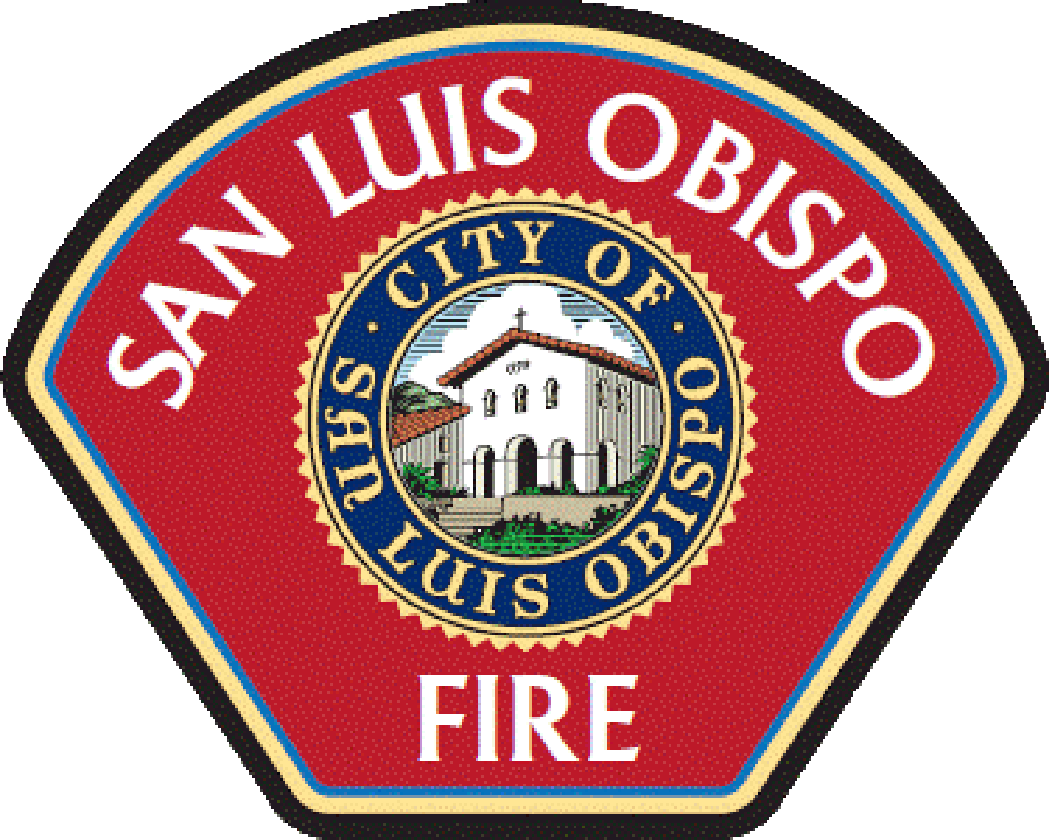

Operational area
- Country: United States
- State: California
- City: San Luis Obispo

Agency overview
- Established: 1876
- Annual calls: 7,421 (2023)
- Employees: 55
- Staffing: 45
- Fire chief: Todd Tuggle
- EMS level: ALS
- IAFF: 3523
- Motto: Courtesy & Service

Facilities and equipment
- Battalions: 1
- Stations: 4
- Engines: 3 - first-run 3 - reserve
- Trucks: 2
- Squads: 1
- Rescues: 1
- Ambulances: 1
- Wildland: 1 - Type 6; 1 - Type 3

Website
- Official website
- IAFF website

The San Luis Obispo City Fire Department provides fire protection and emergency response services for the city of San Luis Obispo, California. It also provides protection or aid to the California Polytechnic State University and the Diablo Canyon Nuclear Power Plant.

== History ==
The San Luis Obispo Fire Department was first organized in 1876 when two hose carts were acquired to form Goodwill Hose Companies 1 and 2.The horses lived at a livery stable located at the intersection of Nipomo Street and Higuera Street. Years later a Tiger hook and ladder was purchased. The fire department later shared a building with the police department and city hall on Higuera Street where Charles Shoes is located. The building caught fire and was eventually demolished. The original jail cells are still present in the rear store room of Charles Shoes.

== EMS ==
The San Luis Obispo Fire Department is a provider of paramedic service in the city. Each fire apparatus is staffed with a minimum of one paramedic, working as a team with EMT's. Most apparatus are staffed with two paramedics whenever staffing permits. In the event of an ambulance shortage, the fire department's Medic Rescue 1 is utilized to provide for transport. Medic Rescue 1 also responds to wildland and vegetation fires throughout the state, staffed with Fireline Paramedics, for firefighter safety.

== Staffing ==
The on duty strength of the department is 14 personnel 24 hours a day, 7 days a week. Three engine companies are staffed with three personnel, and the ladder truck is staffed with four personnel. The battalion chief serves as the on duty supervisor for all crews and responds out of fire station 1. Challenging economic times have kept the fire department staffing the same since 1978, when the call volume was approximately 1000 incidents per year. Since that time, call volume has increased 600%, along with the addition of paramedic services, urban search and rescue, hazmat, and many other modern fire service programs. Recent development in the city has sparked the possibility of a fifth fire station located in the Avila Ranch area near Buckley Road. The environmental impact and fire master plan reports filed with the city show that the trigger point for increased fire department staffing will be in approximately 2024, where a two-person squad unit will be temporarily stationed within the Avila Ranch development. Current call volume statistics reveal that workload should increase to approximately 9,000 incidents per year by that time.

== Stations ==
The city has four fire stations spread throughout the city. Station 1 has the paramedic quint ladder truck as its first out unit. Fire station 4 cross staffs a type 3 fire engine. Station 1 was constructed in 1996, replacing a seismically unsafe facility at the corner of Garden and Pismo. The previous station was sold to a local developer and retrofitted for use as an office. Stations 2, which houses Truck 2, was built in the 1950s. Station 3 was built in the 1960s, and station 4 was built in 1978. There are 2 Engines at Stations 3 and 4.

Fire Station Number	Address	Engine Companies	Truck Companies	Other Units	Personnel
1	2160 Santa Barbara Ave	Engine 1, OES Engine 385	Truck 1	Medic Rescue 1, Patrol 1 & Battalion Chief	5 personnel (including the battalion chief)
2	126 No. Chorro		Truck 2	Utility 2, UTV 2	3 personnel
3	1280 Laurel Ln	Engine 3, Engine 5			3 personnel
4	1395 Madonna Rd	Engine 4, Engine 6			3 personnel
