= Cleveland EMS =

Emergency medical services in Cleveland, Ohio

City of Cleveland Division of Emergency Medical Service
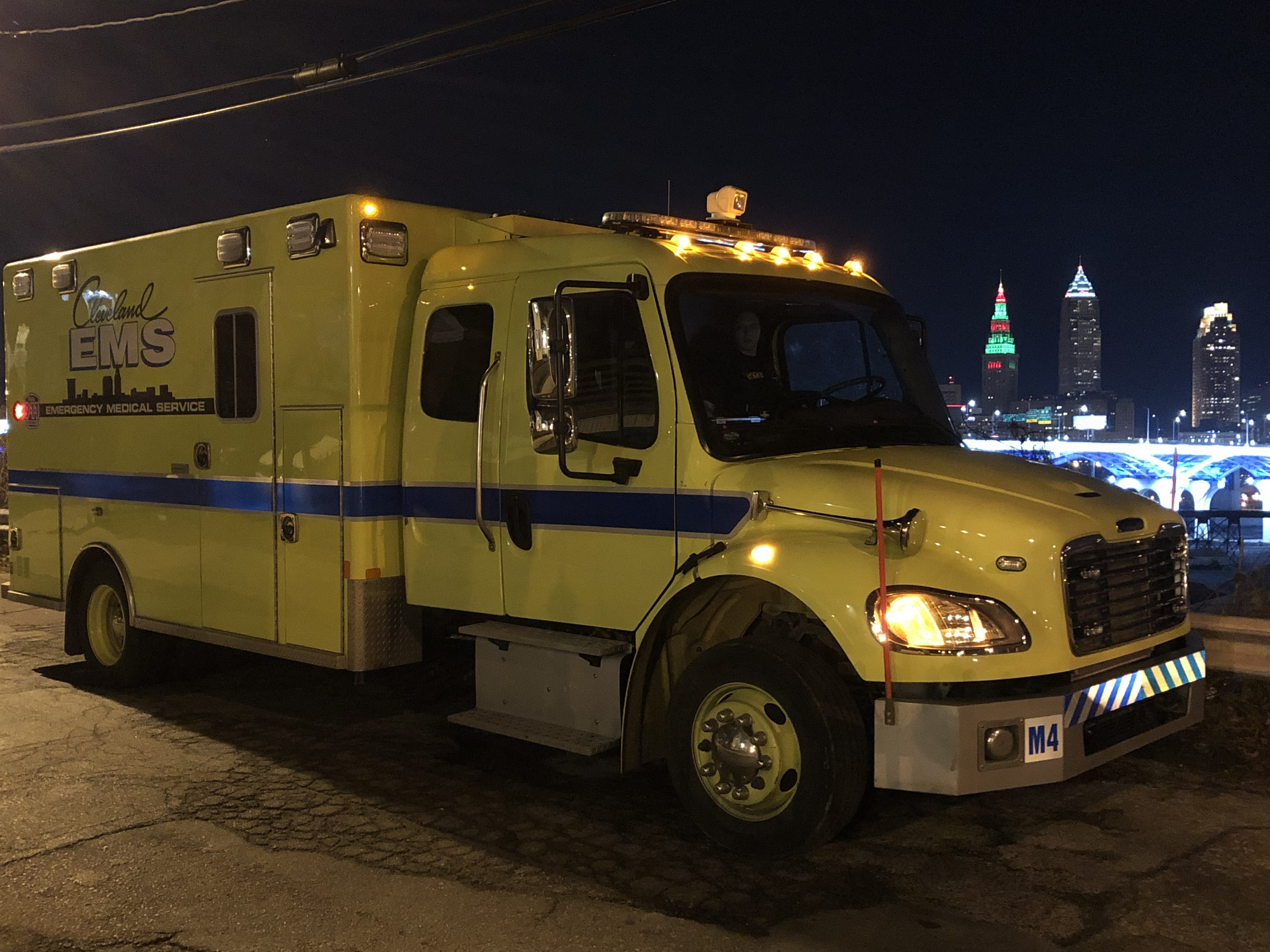
- Cleveland EMS ambulance

Agency overview
- Formed: October 13, 1975
- Jurisdiction: Cleveland, Ohio
- Agency executive: Orlando Wheeler, Commissioner

The City of Cleveland Division of Emergency Medical Service, also known as Cleveland EMS or CEMS, is the division of the municipal government tasked with emergency ambulance transport for the City of Cleveland, Ohio. It is a third service, operating as part of the public safety department.

As of January 2019, the paramedics and EMTs of Cleveland EMS staff 25 Advanced Life Support (ALS) ambulances during the daytime, and 21 during the night shift. In addition, they also provide special event medical standby service upon request. They are supported by Emergency Medical Dispatchers who staff a communications facility known as Radio Emergency Dispatch (RED) center. Counting supervisors and administrative staff, the division is budgeted for 333 employees, with an annual budget of $30.6 million and annual revenues of $14 million.

Cleveland EMS is assisted in providing prehospital care by the Cleveland Fire Department, who provides non-transport "First Responder" services.

Cleveland EMS' Headquarters is located at 1701 Lakeside Ave, Cleveland Ohio, 44114. Cleveland Association of Rescue Employees local 1975 is the primary labor union for Cleveland EMS paramedics, EMTs, and dispatchers.

== Cleveland EMS Call Volume ==
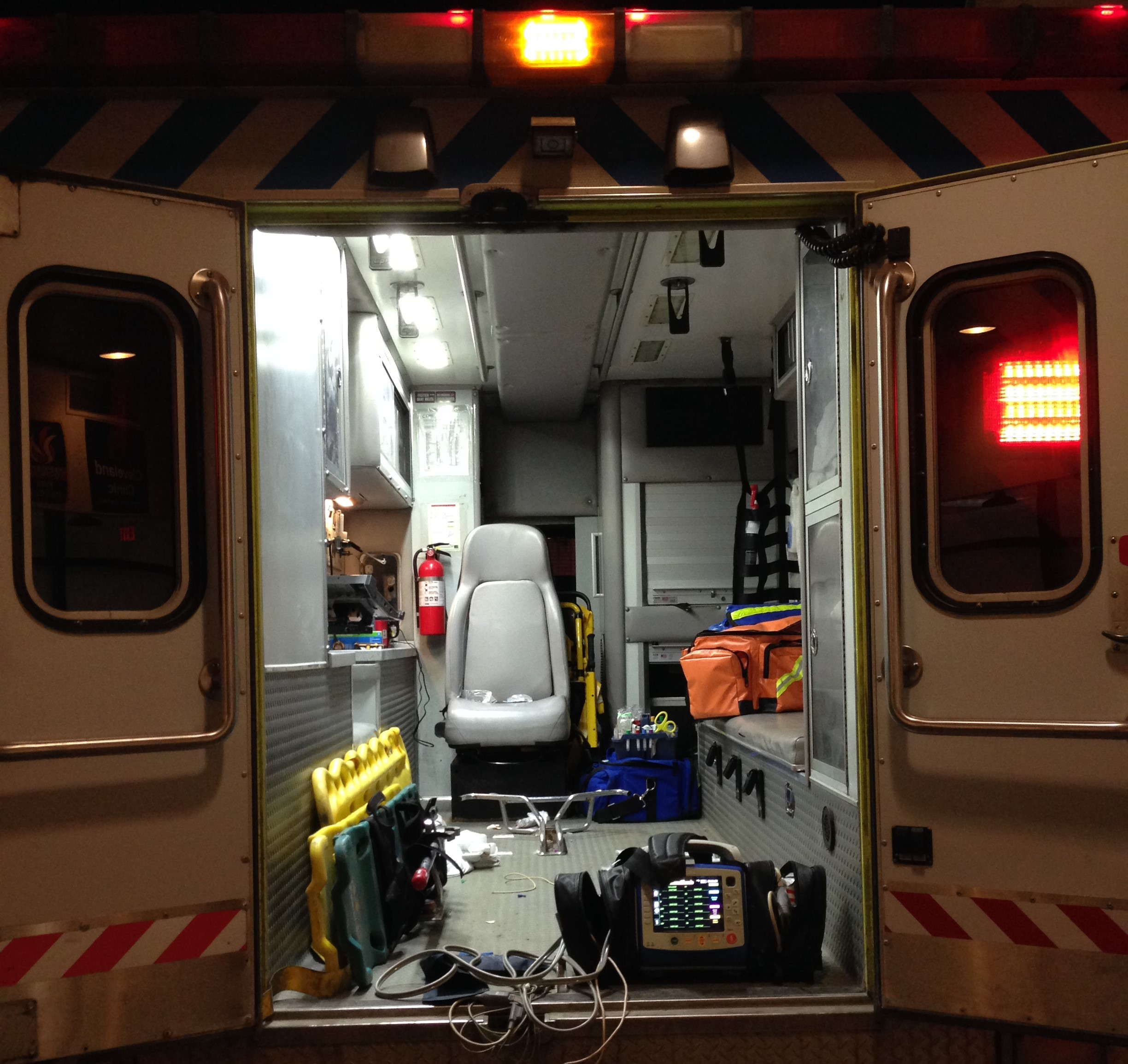
Inside of Cleveland EMS ambulance

Year	911 calls received	EMS calls dispatched	Patients transported to the hospital	Staffed ambulances
2011	94,307	80,267	61,751	15
2012	96,359	83,971	63,501	15
2013	106,385	93,389	67,532	18
2014	109,045	97,028	71,128	18
2015	115,303	103,574	74,658	18
2016	116,056	104,048	75,428	18
2017	116,751	105,714	77,266	21 daytime/19 night
2018	120,487	107,213	79,395	25 daytime/21 night
2019	123,364	109,633	80,602	25 daytime/21 night
2020	119,272	104,937	73,117	25 daytime/21 night
2021	124,842	109,370	74,400	25 daytime/21 night
2022	120,383	106,106	73,655	25 daytime/21 night
2023	120,017	105,570	73,676	23 daytime/19 night
2024	N/a	107,652	77,081	23 daytime/19 night

== History ==
=== 1975-1979 ===
Prior to 1975, emergency ambulance transportation in Cleveland was provided by a combination of Cleveland Police patrol wagons, four Cleveland Fire rescue squads, and private ambulances mostly run by funeral homes. The June 3, 1974, death of Councilman Michael Zone exposed severe shortcomings in this existing system, as it took over 25 minutes for help to reach him after he suffered a heart attack.

Due in part to the public outcry after Zone's death, Mayor Ralph Perk established the new City of Cleveland Division of Emergency Medical Service (CEMS) the following year with 120 Emergency Medical Technicians (EMTs) answering their first emergency calls on Monday, October 13, 1975.

This new division of EMS, separate from the police and fire departments, immediately found itself very busy, answering over 60,000 calls annually by 1977. While considered a vast improvement over the previous system, it also found itself to be the center of controversy. A 1976 feature in Cleveland Magazine illustrated several ways that Mayor Perk maximized the political gain from the new CEMS service just prior to the 1975 mayoral election. The same article also outlined problems within the CEMS leadership, a lack of continuing medical education, broken ambulances, a poor driving record with 84 accidents with 2 years, understaffing, and most disturbingly, that CEMS lacked Advanced Life Support (ALS) paramedic units and had no definite timetable to implement them.

The lack of paramedic-level care would persist throughout the 1970s as the administration of Mayor Dennis Kucinich refused to allow those CEMS personnel who had trained as paramedics to perform advanced skills or administer medications. Assistant Safety Director Tonia Grdina told the Plain Dealer at the time, “The major criticism of the EMS is that its personnel frequently treat victims on the scene instead of transporting them to the hospital immediately.”

=== 1980-1989 ===
In 1980, Mayor George Voinovich recruited Mitchell Brown, a veteran of Pittsburgh's Freedom House Ambulance Service, to head CEMS in a move to improve the service. Things would get worse before they got better, however, with budget cuts dropping the number of CEMS ambulances from 12 in 1982, to 8 by 1985. Despite these budget challenges, Brown was able to implement a new in-house communications center, called Radio Emergency Dispatch (RED) center, and upgraded two CEMS units to ALS status on February 1, 1985. Brown was later promoted to safety director, where he vetoed a 1988 proposal by the Cleveland Fire Department to take over CEMS.

=== 1990-1999 ===
Despite an increase in the late 1980s to 14 EMS units, during the early 1990s many of the same concerns persisted regarding CEMS, including deaths due to delayed responses, unreliable vehicles, low employee pay, high turnover, a large number of low-priority calls, and an overall high call volume given the number available ambulances. Public proposals to improve EMS very similar to those advocated during the mid 1980s again appeared in the local newspaper, the Plain Dealer. Councilman Ken Johnson proposed forming a volunteer EMS first-response unit, while Cleveland firefighters continued their campaign to take over EMS, and the same ambulance company manager who penned a 1984 op-ed again proposed letting private ambulances respond to 911 calls.

Mayor Michael R. White instead chose to embrace the recommendations of an EMS/Fire task force and invested heavily in CEMS. RED center was upgraded with a new computer aided dispatching and call-prioritizing system in 1993, and by 1997 20 CEMS ambulances were in service reducing response times by 28%. This increased investment in CEMS was credited with helping Cleveland realize its lowest homicide rate in decades, with CEMS crews saving many victims of penetrating trauma who would otherwise have been perished. During the 1990s working conditions for CEMS EMTs and paramedics also improved, as the city switched to from 8-hour shifts to 12-hour shifts. Additionally after a protracted battle between the city administration and the Cleveland Association of Rescue Employees (CARE), the main labor union for CEMS, safety equipment such as ballistic vests, helmets and protective coats were obtained for the first time.

On November 5, 1993, CEMS came close to its first line-of-duty death when paramedic Christopher Holt was struck by an automobile at the scene of a freeway accident. Through efforts of CEMS and Metro hospital staff, Holt survived critical injuries and returned to work the following year.

=== 2000-Present ===
As the new century dawned, the 21 ambulances of CEMS took on increased importance as the region saw the first of several hospital closings, with St Luke's closing in 1999, Mt Sinai in 2000, and St Alexis/St Michael in 2003. Through union concessions and chronic understaffing, CEMS was spared from the budget cuts that affected the police and fire departments in 2003. The following year, 24 of the laid-off firefighters and police officers who had EMT or paramedic training were re-hired to work for CEMS to fill vacancies created as other employees left the division.

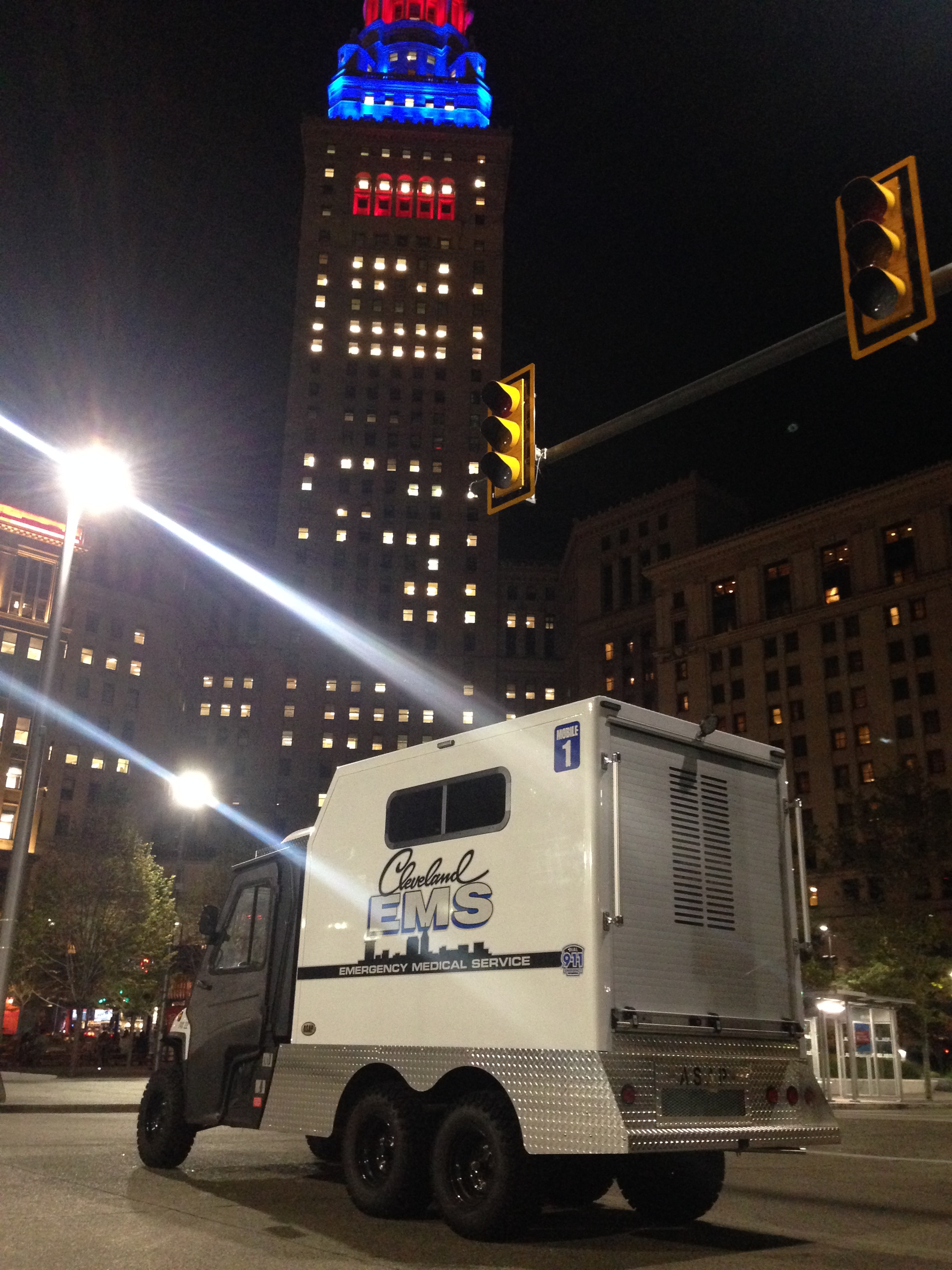
Cleveland EMS mobile unit 1 provides special event medical standby services on public square during the 2016 World Series.

Attrition within CEMS accelerated greatly after a 2007 decision by Commissioner Edward Eckart to switch CEMS workers from the 12-hour shifts they had worked since the early 1990s, to 8-hour shifts in order to save money on overtime. This move backfired, as 88 CEMS workers resigned within 2 years and overtime spending soared as the remaining personnel were forced to work extra mandatory shifts to provide ambulance coverage. CARE challenged the schedule change, and ultimately prevailed in court. 12-hour work shifts were resumed.

Despite the move back to 12-hour shifts, CEMS continued to face cutbacks, as the City of Cleveland was especially hard-hit by the global recession caused by the housing crisis. By 2010, despite no change in call volume, only 15 CEMS ambulances remained in service. Further strain was added to CEMS when the Cleveland Clinic administration closed Huron Road Hospital in 2011, leaving the entire east side of Cleveland without a trauma center.

In a bid to improve EMS, city officials decided to implement the long-proposed idea of merging its fire and EMS divisions, boldly announcing in November 2011 that the merger would be complete by the end of 2012. As one of the initial steps, city officials ended the expensive and inefficient practice of using fire department heavy rescue squads staffed with 4 firefighters as backup ambulances. The city then used the money saved to open three additional CEMS ambulances for a total of 18 CEMS units. The city also cross-trained 6 CEMS paramedics at the Cleveland fire academy. Despite these steps, city officials abandoned the merger plan after the firefighter's union voted down a merger proposal in May 2014.

After the merger plan was abandoned, the city again decided to invest in CEMS to meet the demands of a rapidly increasing call volume. After the passage of an income tax levy in 2016, additional staff were hired and new ambulances were purchased to increase the total number of units to 25 during the daytime and 21 at night by the beginning of 2018. During this time, local trauma care also improved, as University Hospitals attained Level 1 Trauma center status at the end of 2015. This relieved MetroHealth of the responsibility of being the sole Level 1 trauma center in Cuyahoga County and helped fill the void left by the sudden closure of Huron Road hospital 5 years earlier.

Cleveland Emergency Medical Services began carrying nasal-spray Narcan, the opioid antagonist drug that reverses an opioid overdose in 1985. In 2016, the division's ambulances began offering Project DAWN (Deaths Avoided with naloxone) Narcan kits to citizens. Narcan, a naloxone nasal spray, can be used by untrained individuals relatively simply. The kits were also available at EMS headquarters. Project DAWN is a community-based overdose education program that dispenses Narcan to combat Ohio's opioid overdose crisis.

During the 2020 global pandemic, Cleveland EMS saw its first decline in call volume in several years. This mirrored local and national trends, where people avoided healthcare facilities because of concerns they might contract the CoVID-19 virus. During this time, Cleveland EMS continued to answer emergency calls, with medics wearing increased personal protective equipment, including N95 respirators. Despite these measures, several EMS providers still contracted CoVID-19. Cleveland EMS providers were among the first local healthcare providers to receive the CoVID-19 vaccine once it became available in late 2020. They also helped distribute the vaccine to others by staffing vaccination clinics.

In 2022, Orlando Wheeler was appointed Interim Commissioner of EMS replacing Nicole Carlton. Cleveland EMS also began receiving 15 new ambulances funded by ARPA monies. By September 2023, Orlando Wheeler was appointed to the commissioner position permanently.

In 2025, Commissioner Wheeler partnered with Metrohealth hospital to allow Cleveland EMS paramedics to administer prehospital blood transfusions to reduce morbidity and mortality from traumatic injuries. In late 2025, CEMS also rolled out ventilators on every ambulance allowing for improved respiratory care.
