= List of municipalities in Rhode Island =

Map of the United States with Rhode Island highlighted

Municipalities in Rhode Island

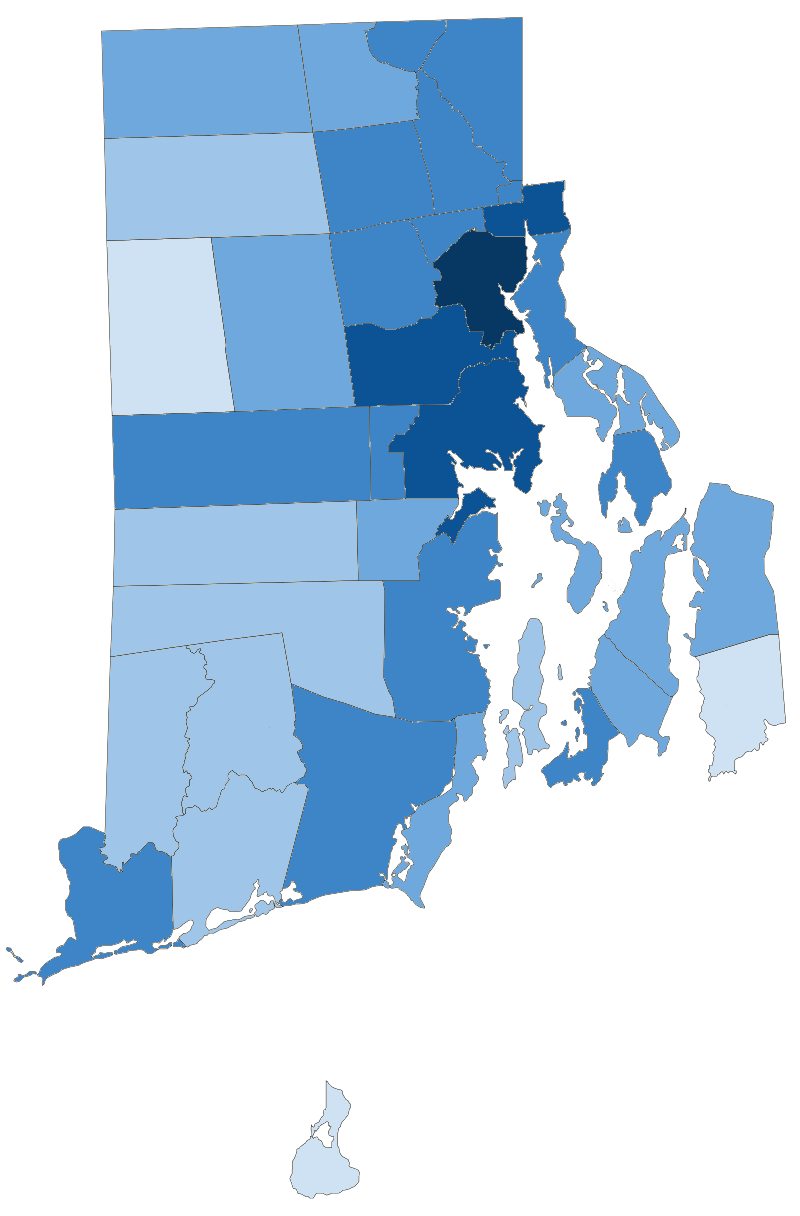
Municipalities by population, according to 2020 census data

Rhode Island is a state located in the Northeastern United States. According to the 2020 United States Census, Rhode Island is the 8th least populous state with 1,097,379 inhabitants and the smallest by land area spanning 1,033.81 square miles (2,677.6 km^{2}) of land. It is divided into 39 municipalities, including 8 cities and 31 towns, grouped into 5 historical counties that have no municipal functions as the state has no county level of government. The entire area of the state is incorporated; all Rhode Island residents live within the borders of a city or town though some communities within towns and cities are census-designated places.

Municipalities in Rhode Island can incorporate as a town or city by a special act of the state legislature and there is no minimum population requirement. Eight municipalities were re-incorporated as cities operating under a charter, while the other 31 remain as towns which perform similar services. Since Rhode Island has no county level of government, cities and towns provide services commonly performed by county governments in other states. The state's cities and towns may adopt one of four forms of government: council–manager, mayor–council, town council–town meeting, or administrator–council. The primary difference between these forms of government is how the chief executive is selected. The Council–manager system involves an elected council who exercise overall control of the local government and a chief executive termed city or town manager who is generally appointed by and responsible to the council for the administration of local policies. Council–manager systems may elect a mayor but they have no formal administrative functions with the potential exception of a degree of veto power. Mayor–council systems have a similarly elected council however the mayor is elected and yields administrative power. In the town council–town meeting system, there is no full-time chief executive.

The largest municipality by population in Rhode Island is the state capital of Providence, with 190,934 residents. The smallest municipality by population is New Shoreham on Block Island, with 1,410 year-round residents. The largest municipality by land area is Coventry which spans 59.05 sq mi (152.9 km^{2}), while Central Falls is the smallest at 1.20 sq mi (3.1 km^{2}).

== Cities and towns ==
Largest municipalities in Rhode Island by population

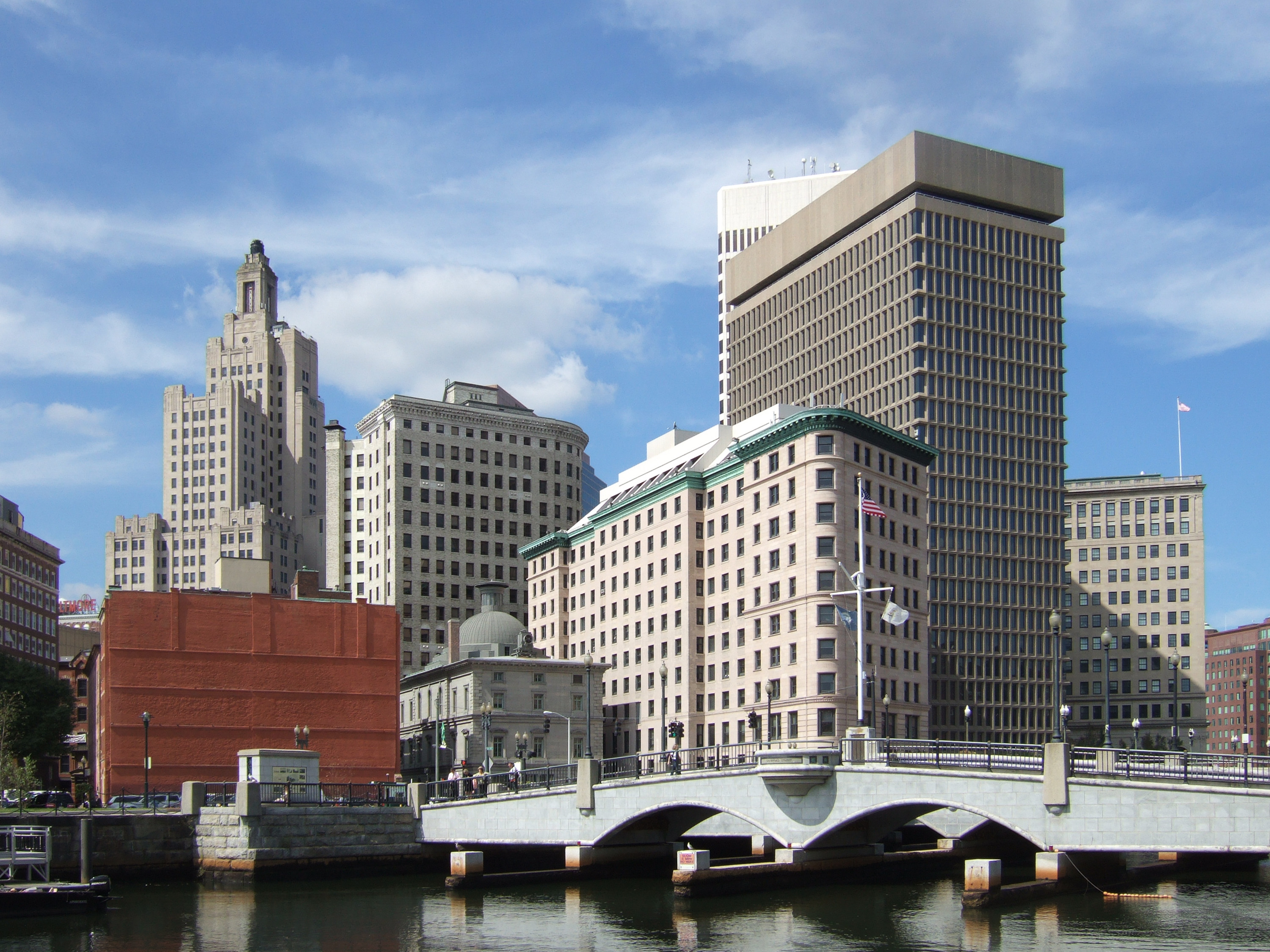
Downtown Providence, the capital and most populous city in Rhode Island

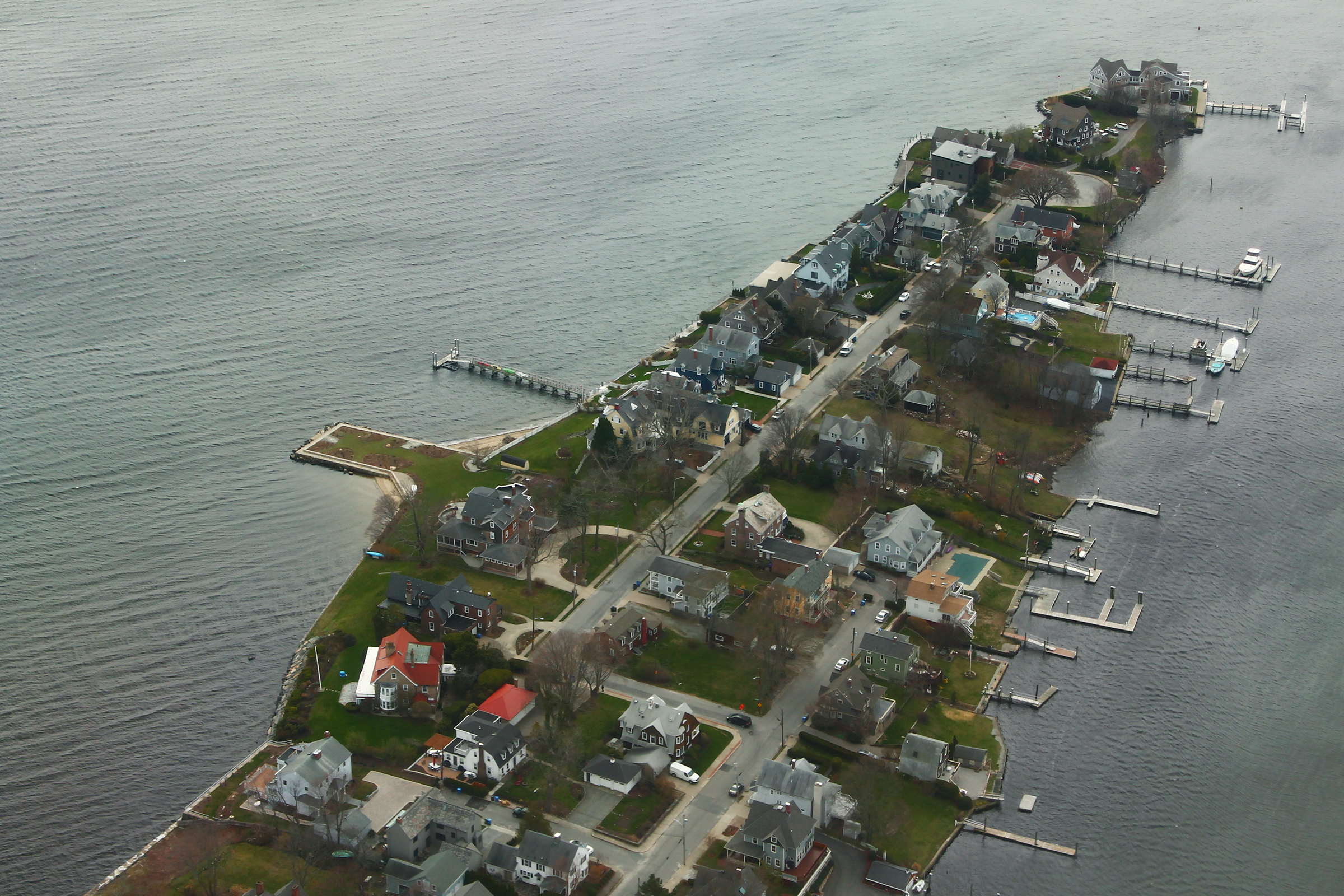
A view over Cranston, the second most populous city in Rhode Island

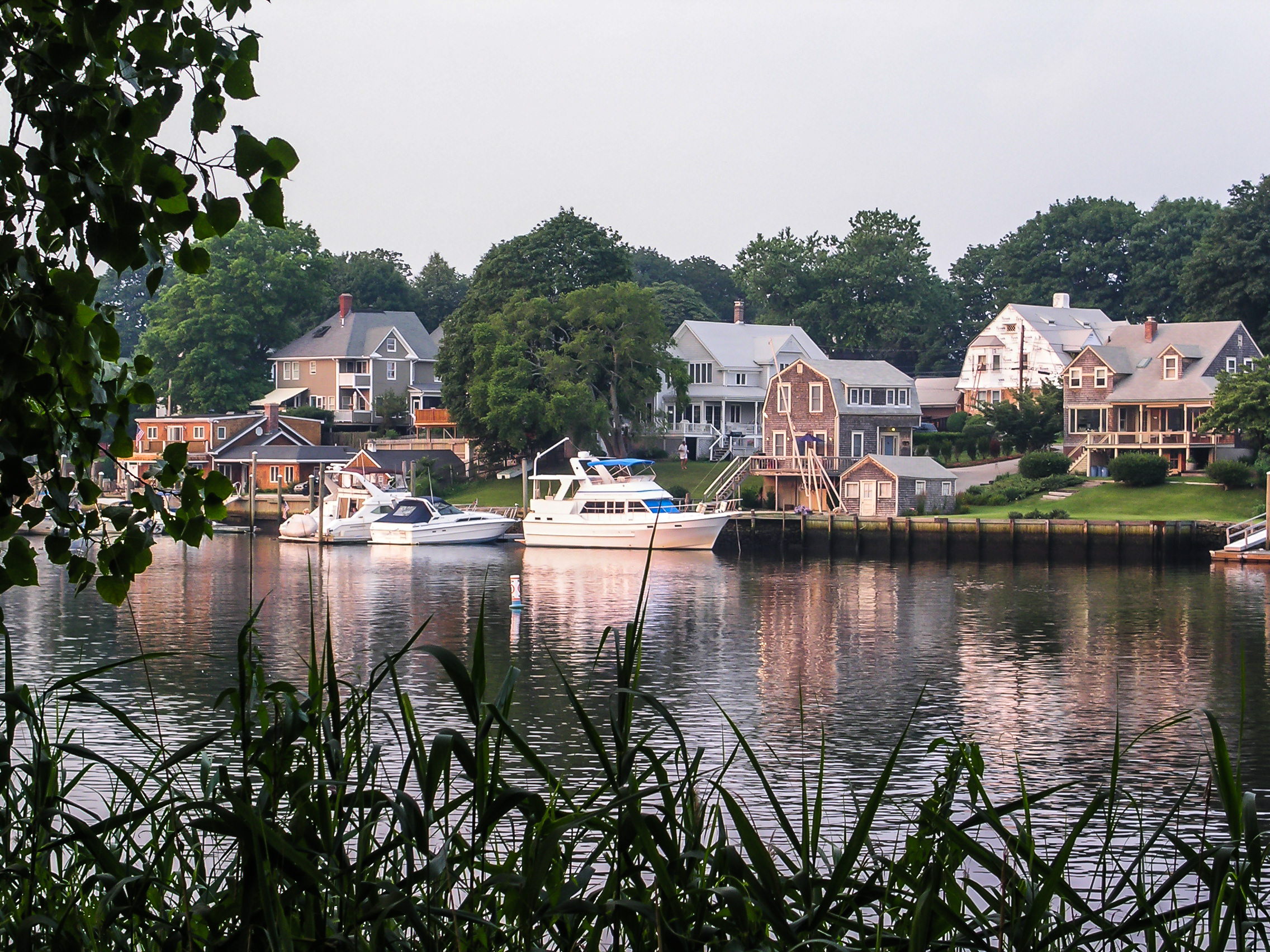
Boats and homes in Warwick, the third most populous city in Rhode Island

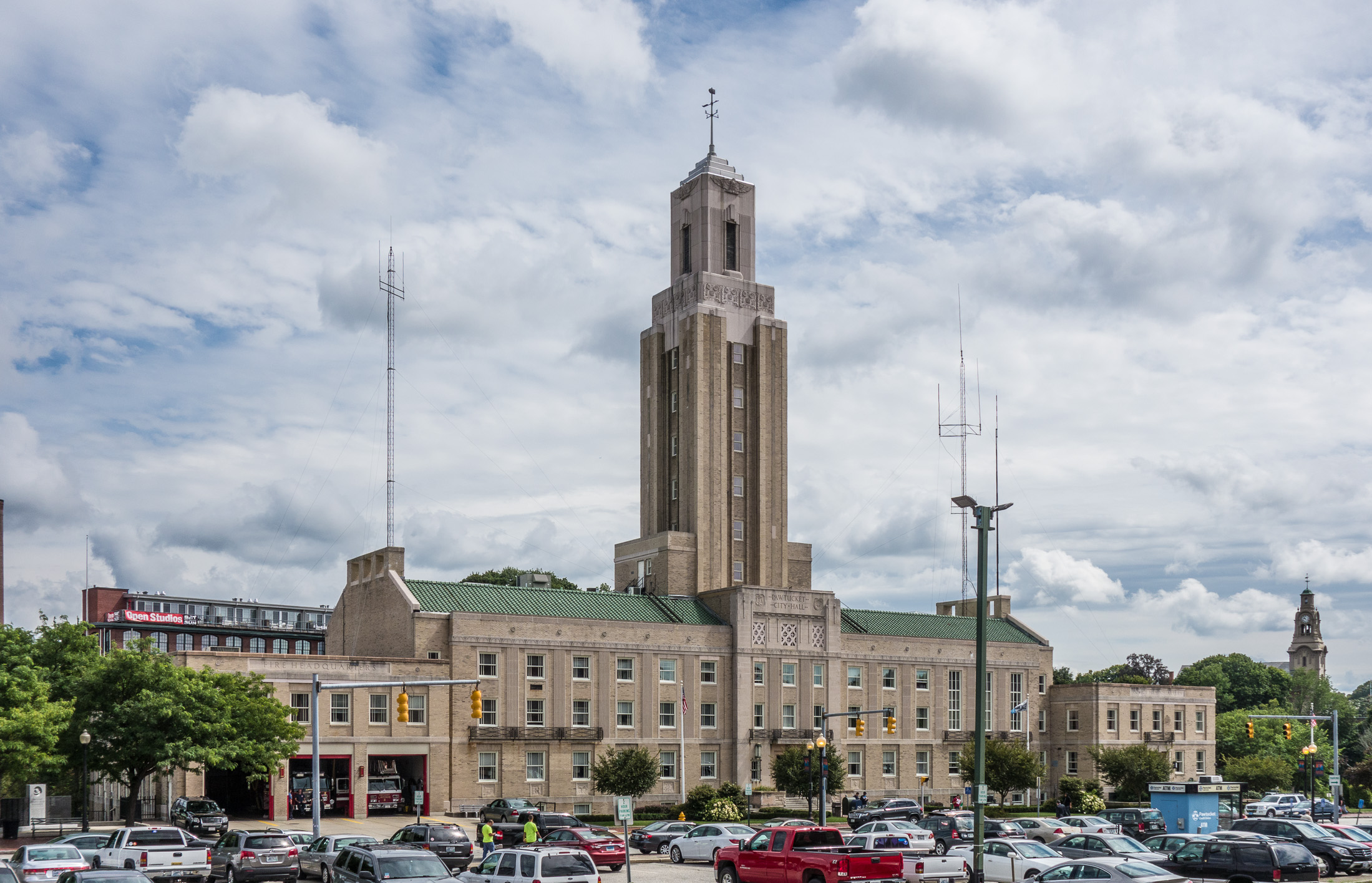
The city hall of Pawtucket, the fourth most populous city in Rhode Island

† State capital and largest city

Name	Type	County	Form of government	Population (2020)	Population (2010)	Change	Land area (2020)		Population density	Year established	Year incorporated (Note: Refers to the date of incorporation of the current municipal status.)
Name	Type	County	Form of government	Population (2020)	Population (2010)	Change	sq mi	km^{2}	Population density	Year established	Year incorporated
Barrington	Town	Bristol	Council–manager	17,153	16,310	+5.2%	8.22	21.3	2,086.7/sq mi (805.7/km^{2})	1653	1770
Bristol	Town	Bristol	Council–manager	22,493	22,954	−2.0%	9.82	25.4	2,290.5/sq mi (884.4/km^{2})	1680	1746
Burrillville	Town	Providence	Council–manager	16,158	15,955	+1.3%	55.03	142.5	293.6/sq mi (113.4/km^{2})	1730	1806
Central Falls	City	Providence	Mayor–council	22,583	19,376	+16.6%	1.20	3.1	18,819.2/sq mi (7,266.1/km^{2})	1730	1895
Charlestown	Town	Washington	Council–manager	7,997	7,827	+2.2%	36.45	94.4	219.4/sq mi (84.7/km^{2})	1669	1738
Coventry	Town	Kent	Council–manager	35,688	35,014	+1.9%	59.05	152.9	604.4/sq mi (233.3/km^{2})	1639	1743 (Note: There is a discrepancy in dates from the two provided sources, with the Snow (1865) source listing the incorporation date as 1741.)
Cranston	City	Providence	Mayor–council	82,934	80,387	+3.2%	28.34	73.4	2,926.4/sq mi (1,129.9/km^{2})	1754	1910
Cumberland	Town	Providence	Mayor–council	36,405	33,506	+8.7%	26.45	68.5	1,376.4/sq mi (531.4/km^{2})	1746	1746
East Greenwich	Town	Kent	Council–manager	14,312	13,146	+8.9%	16.39	42.4	873.2/sq mi (337.2/km^{2})	1677	1677 (Note: This date is only found in the Snow (1865) source and is absent in the Government of Rhode Island source.)
East Providence	City	Providence	Mayor–council	47,139	47,037	+0.2%	13.24	34.3	3,560.3/sq mi (1,374.7/km^{2})	1812	1958
Exeter	Town	Washington	Town meeting	6,460	6,425	+0.5%	57.47	148.8	112.4/sq mi (43.4/km^{2})	1641	1641 (Note: There is a discrepancy in dates from the two provided sources, with the Snow (1865) source listing the incorporation date as 1742–1743.)
Foster	Town	Providence	Town meeting	4,469	4,606	−3.0%	50.80	131.6	88.0/sq mi (34.0/km^{2})	1636	1781
Glocester	Town	Providence	Town meeting	9,974	9,746	+2.3%	54.18	140.3	184.1/sq mi (71.1/km^{2})	1639	1730–1731
Hopkinton	Town	Washington	Town meeting	8,398	8,188	+2.6%	42.95	111.2	195.5/sq mi (75.5/km^{2})	1639	1757
Jamestown	Town	Newport	Council–manager	5,559	5,405	+2.8%	9.45	24.5	588.3/sq mi (227.1/km^{2})	1639	1678
Johnston	Town	Providence	Mayor–council	29,568	28,769	+2.8%	23.43	60.7	1,262.0/sq mi (487.3/km^{2})	1636	1759
Lincoln	Town	Providence	Council–manager	22,529	21,105	+6.7%	18.12	46.9	1,243.3/sq mi (480.0/km^{2})	1650	1871
Little Compton	Town	Newport	Town meeting	3,616	3,492	+3.6%	20.52	53.1	176.2/sq mi (68.0/km^{2})	1682	1746
Middletown	Town	Newport	Council–manager	17,075	16,150	+5.7%	12.72	32.9	1,342.4/sq mi (518.3/km^{2})	1639	1743
Narragansett	Town	Washington	Council–manager	14,532	15,868	−8.4%	13.89	36.0	1,046.2/sq mi (403.9/km^{2})	1888	1901
Newport	City	Newport	Council–manager	25,163	24,672	+2.0%	7.67	19.9	3,280.7/sq mi (1,266.7/km^{2})	1639	1784 (Note: This date is only found in the Government of Rhode Island source and is absent in the Snow (1865) source.)
New Shoreham	Town	Washington	Council–manager	1,410	1,051	+34.2%	9.08	23.5	155.3/sq mi (60.0/km^{2})	1664	1672
North Kingstown	Town	Washington	Council–manager	27,732	26,486	+4.7%	43.14	111.7	642.8/sq mi (248.2/km^{2})	1641	1674
North Providence	Town	Providence	Mayor–council	34,114	32,078	+6.3%	5.62	14.6	6,070.1/sq mi (2,343.7/km^{2})	1636	1765
North Smithfield	Town	Providence	Council–manager	12,588	11,967	+5.2%	23.80	61.6	528.9/sq mi (204.2/km^{2})	1730	1871
Pawtucket	City	Providence	Mayor–council	75,604	71,148	+6.3%	8.68	22.5	8,710.1/sq mi (3,363.0/km^{2})	1671	1954
Portsmouth	Town	Newport	Council–manager	17,871	17,389	+2.8%	22.98	59.5	777.7/sq mi (300.3/km^{2})	1638	1640 (Note: This date is only found in the Snow (1865) source and is absent in the Government of Rhode Island source.)
Providence†	City	Providence	Mayor–council	190,934	178,042	+7.2%	18.40	47.7	10,376.8/sq mi (4,006.5/km^{2})	1636	1832
Richmond	Town	Washington	Town meeting	8,020	7,708	+4.0%	40.29	104.4	199.1/sq mi (76.9/km^{2})	1636	1730
Scituate	Town	Providence	Town meeting	10,384	10,329	+0.5%	48.16	124.7	215.6/sq mi (83.2/km^{2})	1636	1730
Smithfield	Town	Providence	Council–manager	22,118	21,430	+3.2%	26.31	68.1	840.7/sq mi (324.6/km^{2})	1636	1730
South Kingstown	Town	Washington	Council–manager	31,931	30,639	+4.2%	56.45	146.2	565.7/sq mi (218.4/km^{2})	1657	1723 (Note: There is a discrepancy in dates from the two provided sources, with the Snow (1865) source listing the incorporation date as 1722.)
Tiverton	Town	Newport	Town meeting	16,359	15,780	+3.7%	29.05	75.2	563.1/sq mi (217.4/km^{2})	1694	1746
Warren	Town	Bristol	Council–manager	11,147	10,611	+5.1%	6.12	15.9	1,821.4/sq mi (703.2/km^{2})	1620	1747
Warwick	City	Kent	Mayor–council	82,823	82,672	+0.2%	35.04	90.8	2,363.7/sq mi (912.6/km^{2})	1642	1931
Westerly	Town	Washington	Council–manager	23,359	22,787	+2.5%	29.52	76.5	791.3/sq mi (305.5/km^{2})	1661	1669
West Greenwich	Town	Kent	Town meeting	6,528	6,135	+6.4%	50.26	130.2	129.9/sq mi (50.1/km^{2})	1639	1741
West Warwick	Town	Kent	Council–manager	31,012	29,191	+6.2%	7.79	20.2	3,981.0/sq mi (1,537.1/km^{2})	1648	1913
Woonsocket	City	Providence	Mayor–council	43,240	41,186	+5.0%	7.74	20.0	5,586.6/sq mi (2,157.0/km^{2})	1867	1888
Total	—	—	—	1,097,379	1,052,567	+4.3%	1,033.82	2,677.6	1,061.48/sq mi (409.84/km^{2})	—	—

== See also ==
- List of census-designated places in Rhode Island
