= List of census-designated places in Rhode Island =

Census-designated places in Rhode Island

This is a list of census-designated places in Rhode Island. The United States Census Bureau defines census-designated places as unincorporated communities lacking elected municipal officers and boundaries with legal status.

As of the 2020 census, Rhode Island had 28 census-designated places. Most are small communities and villages inside towns, but a few account for the entire area and population of their respective towns.

== Census-designated places ==
Name	County	Population (2020)	Area (2020)		Coordinates
Name	County	Population (2020)	sq mi	km^{2}	Coordinates
Ashaway	Washington	1,501	2.4	6.2	41°25′23″N 71°47′20″W
Bradford	Washington	1,457	1.9	4.9	41°24′2″N 71°44′51″W
Carolina	Washington	924	2.5	6.5	41°27′31″N 71°39′51″W
Charlestown (Note: The CDP's boundaries are coextensive with the town of the same name.)	Washington	7,997	2.3	6.0	41°23′7″N 71°40′5″W
Chepachet	Providence	1,704	5.5	14.2	41°54′54″N 71°40′17″W
Clayville	Providence	312	1.75	4.5	41°46′37″N 71°40′34″W
Cumberland Hill	Providence	8,140	3.4	8.8	41°58′15″N 71°27′35″W
Foster Center	Providence	333	2.18	5.6	41°47′24″N 71°43′44″W
Greene	Kent	914	6.09	15.8	41°41′28″N 71°44′45″W
Greenville	Providence	9,061	5.7	14.8	41°52′36″N 71°33′12″W
Harmony	Providence	1,036	2.97	7.7	41°53′16″N 71°35′48″W
Harrisville	Providence	1,745	0.8	2.1	41°58′7″N 71°40′48″W
Hope Valley	Washington	1,870	3.5	9.1	41°30′43″N 71°42′55″W
Hopkinton	Washington	8,398	3.3	8.5	41°27′40″N 71°46′39″W
Kingston	Washington	7,825	1.56	4.0	41°28′23.44″N 71°31′26.84″W
Melville	Newport	1,609	5.1	13.2	41°35′16.37″N 71°17′3.67″W
Misquamicut	Washington	434	1.25	3.2	41°19′26″N 71°49′19″W
Narragansett Pier	Washington	3,308	3.9	10.1	41°25′48″N 71°27′59″W
Newport East	Newport	12,337	5.75	14.9	41°30′31″N 71°17′17″W
Pascoag	Providence	4,641	5.5	14.2	41°57′27″N 71°42′21″W
Quonochontaug	Washington	422	5.5	14.2	41°20′42.29″N 71°42′16.77″W
Tiverton	Newport	7,809	4.18	10.8	41°39′14.45″N 71°12′1.40″W
Valley Falls	Providence	12,094	3.7	9.6	41°55′3″N 71°23′32″W
Wakefield-Peacedale	Washington	8,925	5.1	13.2	41°26′28″N 71°29′57″W
Watch Hill	Washington	212	0.8	2.1	41°18′49″N 71°50′59″W
Weekapaug	Washington	467	1.2	3.1	41°19′51″N 71°45′18″W
Westerly	Washington	18,423	15.83	41.0	41°22′23.88″N 71°48′24.41″W
Wyoming	Washington	415	0.86	2.2	41°30′57″N 71°42′12″W

== See also ==
- List of counties in Rhode Island
- List of municipalities in Rhode Island
