= Urban Search and Rescue Florida Task Force 2 =

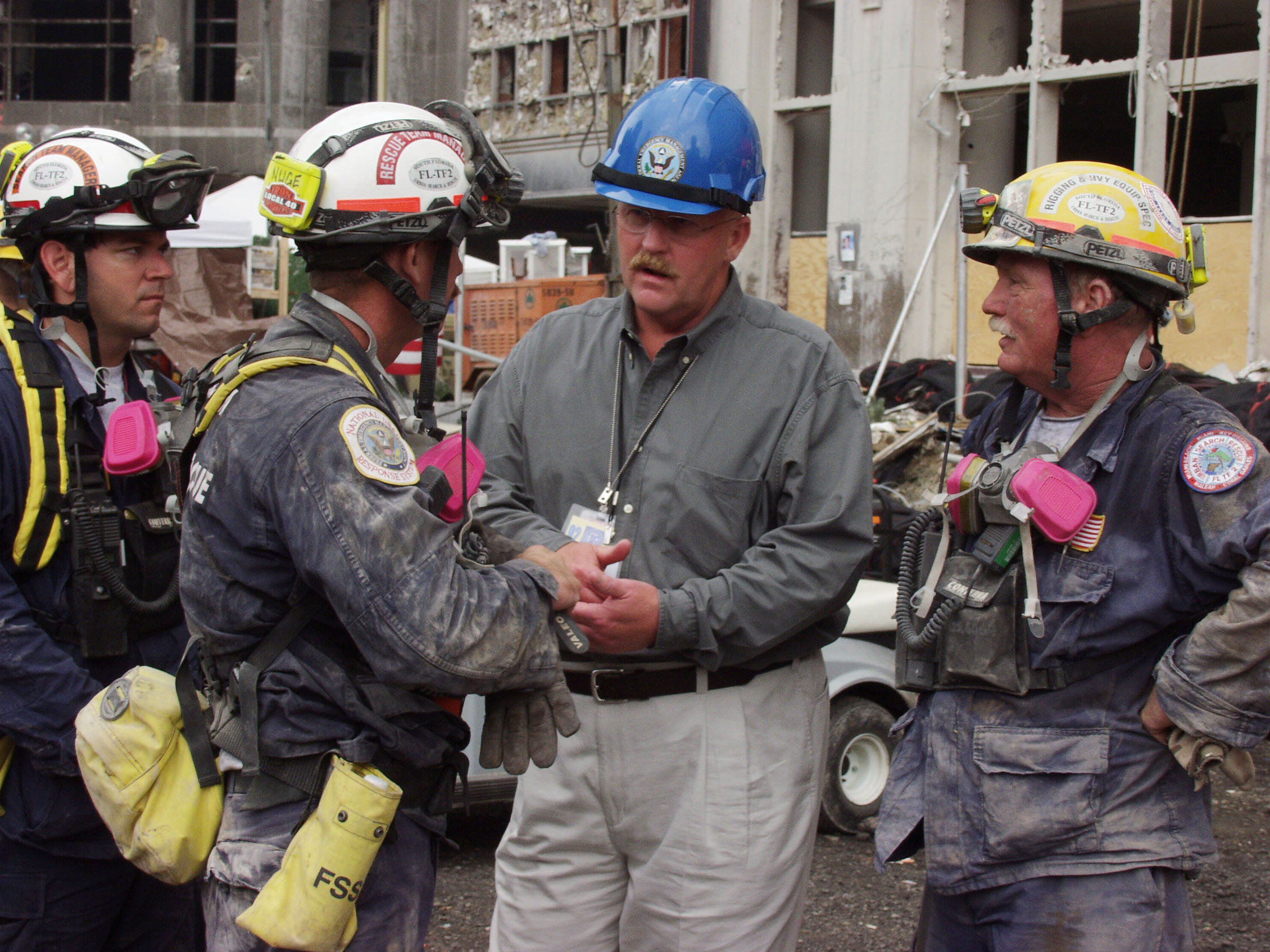
FEMA Director Joe Allbaugh meets with FL-TF2 at the World Trade Center on September 24, 2001.

Urban Search and Rescue Florida Task Force 2 or FL-TF2 is a FEMA Urban Search and Rescue Task Force based in Miami, Florida and sponsored by the Miami Fire Department. FL-TF2 was started in 1991 and is designed to respond to a variety of disasters, including earthquakes, hurricanes, and terrorist attacks. The Miami Fire Department sponsors the team, and provides administrative staff as well as warehouse space and other infrastructure needs. The team is composed of experts from 23 additional fire and police departments as well as civilians making up the 210 members of the team.

== Deployments ==
- 1995 - Hurricane Opal
- 1996 - Humberto Vidal explosion in Río Piedras, Puerto Rico
- 1998 - Papua New Guinea earthquake
- 1999 - Hurricane Floyd
- 2001 - World Trade Center
- 2003 - Space Shuttle Columbia disaster
- 2004 - Hurricane Charley
- 2004 - Hurricane Frances
- 2005 - Hurricane Katrina
- 2005 - Hurricane Katrina
- 2010 - Haiti earthquake
- 2021 - Surfside Condominium Collapse in Surfside, Florida
