= List of populated places in the United States with Hispanic plurality populations =

This is a list of populated places in the United States where Hispanic or Latino residents form a plurality or majority of the population. The places listed span multiple states, with a concentration in California.

== Places ==
- Ashland, California
- Balch Springs, Texas
- Barstow, California
- Boyes Hot Springs, California
- Buena Park, California
- Cabazon, California
- Calistoga, California
- Carpinteria, California
- Carson, California
- Charter Oak, California
- Colma, California
- Corona, California
- Cressey, California
- Dalton, Georgia
- Del Aire, California
- Eastvale, California
- Escondido, California
- Fruitridge Pocket, California
- Gardena, California
- Gerber, California
- Green Acres, California
- Hacienda Heights, California
- Hackensack, New Jersey
- Harbor City, Los Angeles
- Hartranft, Philadelphia
- Hayward, California
- Hendry County, Florida
- Hesperia, California
- Highland, California
- Imperial Beach, California
- La Presa, California
- Lake Elsinore, California
- Lake Placid, Florida
- Lathrop, California
- Lemon Hill, California
- Lenwood, California
- Live Oak, Sutter County, California
- Long Beach, California
- Los Angeles
- Merced, California
- Mid-City, Los Angeles
- Newark, California
- North Long Beach, Long Beach, California
- Oceano, California
- Pacoima, Los Angeles
- Parkway, California
- Pittsburg, California
- Reservoir, Providence, Rhode Island
- Richmond, California
- Riverside, California
- Salida, California
- San Jose, California
- San Juan Bautista, California
- San Lorenzo, California
- Seaside, California
- Silver Lake, Providence, Rhode Island
- Stockton, California
- Tara Hills, California
- Tustin, California
- Valley, Providence, Rhode Island
- Victorville, California
- Visalia, California
- Vista, California
- Warm Springs, California
- West Long Beach
- Winchester, California
- Winnetka, Los Angeles
- Woodland, California
