= Lists of populated places in the United States =

The following is a set–index article, providing a list of lists, for the cities, towns and villages within the jurisdictional United States. It is divided, alphabetically, according to the state, territory, or district name in which they are located.

== A ==
=== Alabama ===
- Census-designated places in Alabama
- Cities and towns in Alabama

=== Alaska ===
- Census-designated places in Alaska
- Cities in Alaska

=== Arizona ===
- Census-designated places in Arizona
- Cities and towns in Arizona
- Places in Arizona

=== Arkansas ===
- Census-designated places in Arkansas
- Cities and towns in Arkansas

== C ==
=== California ===
- Census-designated places in California
- Cities and towns in California
- Communities in California

=== Colorado ===
- List of populated places in Colorado
  - List of census-designated places in Colorado
  - List of county seats in Colorado
  - List of forts in Colorado
  - List of ghost towns in Colorado
  - List of historic places in Colorado
  - List of municipalities in Colorado
  - List of post offices in Colorado

=== Connecticut ===
- Census-designated places in Connecticut
- Boroughs in Connecticut
- Cities in Connecticut
- Towns in Connecticut

== D ==
=== Delaware ===
- Census-designated places in Delaware
- Incorporated places in Delaware
- Places in Delaware

=== District of Columbia ===
- Neighborhoods in Washington, D.C.

== F ==
=== Florida ===
- Census-designated places in Florida
- Municipalities in Florida
- Places in Florida

== G ==
=== Georgia ===
- Census-designated places in Georgia
- Municipalities in Georgia
- Places in Georgia

== H ==
=== Hawaii ===
- List of census-designated places in Hawaii

== I ==
=== Idaho ===
- Census-designated places in Idaho
- Cities in Idaho
- Places in Idaho

=== Illinois ===
- Census-designated places in Illinois
- Municipalities in Illinois
- Towns and villages in Illinois

=== Indiana ===
- Census-designated places in Indiana
- Cities in Indiana
- Towns in Indiana

=== Iowa ===
- Census-designated places in Iowa
- Cities in Iowa

== K ==
=== Kansas ===
- Census-designated places in Kansas
- Cities in Kansas

=== Kentucky ===
- Cities in Kentucky

== L ==
=== Louisiana ===
- Census-designated places in Louisiana
- Municipalities in Louisiana
- Unincorporated communities in Louisiana

== M ==
=== Maine ===
- Census-designated places in Maine
- Cities in Maine
- Plantations in Maine
- Towns in Maine

=== Maryland ===
- Census-designated places in Maryland
- Municipalities in Maryland

=== Massachusetts ===
- Census-designated places in Massachusetts
- Municipalities in Massachusetts
- Villages in Massachusetts

=== Michigan ===
- Census-designated places in Michigan
- Cities, villages, and townships in Michigan

=== Minnesota ===
- Census-designated places in Minnesota
- Cities in Minnesota

=== Mississippi ===
- Census-designated places in Mississippi
- Municipalities in Mississippi

=== Missouri ===
- Census-designated places in Missouri
- Cities in Missouri
- Municipalities in Missouri
- Villages in Missouri

=== Montana ===
- Census-designated places in Montana
- Cities and towns in Montana
- Places in Montana

== N ==
=== Nebraska ===
- Cities in Nebraska
- Unincorporated communities in Nebraska
- Villages in Nebraska

=== Nevada ===
- Census-designated places in Nevada
- Cities in Nevada

=== New Hampshire ===
- Census-designated places in New Hampshire
- Cities and towns in New Hampshire

=== New Jersey ===
- Census-designated places in New Jersey
- Municipalities in New Jersey

=== New Mexico ===
- Census-designated places in New Mexico
- Municipalities in New Mexico

=== New York ===
- Census-designated places in New York
- Cities in New York
- Places in New York
- Towns in New York
- Villages in New York

=== North Carolina ===
- Census-designated places in North Carolina
- Municipalities in North Carolina
- Unincorporated communities in North Carolina

=== North Dakota ===
- Census-designated places in North Dakota
- Cities in North Dakota

== O ==
=== Ohio ===
- Census-designated places in Ohio
- Cities in Ohio
- Villages in Ohio

=== Oklahoma ===
- Census-designated places in Oklahoma
- List of municipalities in Oklahoma

=== Oregon ===
- Cities and unincorporated communities in Oregon

== P ==
=== Pennsylvania ===
- Census-designated places in Pennsylvania
- Cities in Pennsylvania
- Towns and boroughs in Pennsylvania
- Townships in Pennsylvania

=== Puerto Rico ===
- Municipalities of Puerto Rico
- List of communities in Puerto Rico

== R ==
=== Rhode Island ===
- Census-designated places in Rhode Island
- Municipalities in Rhode Island

== S ==
=== South Carolina ===
- Census-designated places in South Carolina
- Cities and towns in South Carolina

=== South Dakota ===
- Census-designated places in South Dakota
- Cities in South Dakota
- Towns in South Dakota

== T ==
=== Tennessee ===
- Census-designated places in Tennessee
- Municipalities in Tennessee

=== Texas ===
- Census-designated places in Texas
- Cities in Texas
- Towns in Texas
- Unincorporated communities in Texas

== U ==
=== Utah ===
- Census-designated places in Utah
- Municipalities in Utah

== V ==
=== Vermont ===
- Census-designated places in Vermont
- Cities in Vermont
- Towns in Vermont
- Villages in Vermont

=== Virginia ===
- Census-designated places in Virginia
- Cities in Virginia
- Towns in Virginia

== W ==
=== Washington ===
- Census-designated places in Washington
- Cities in Washington
- Towns in Washington

=== West Virginia ===
- Census-designated places in West Virginia
- Cities in West Virginia
- Towns in West Virginia

=== Wisconsin ===
- Census-designated places in Wisconsin
- Cities in Wisconsin
- Towns in Wisconsin
- Villages in Wisconsin

=== Wyoming ===
- Census-designated places in Wyoming
- Municipalities in Wyoming

== See also ==
- United States
  - Outline of the United States
  - Index of United States-related articles
  - United States Census Bureau
    - Demographics of the United States
      - Urbanization in the United States
      - List of U.S. states and territories by population
      - List of United States cities by population
  - United States Office of Management and Budget
    - Statistical area (United States)
      - Combined statistical area (list)
      - Core-based statistical area (list)
        - Metropolitan statistical area (list)
        - Micropolitan statistical area (list)
- Local government in the United States
- List of American cities by year of foundation
- List of populated places in the United States with Hispanic plurality populations
- List of U.S. municipalities established or dissolved since 2020
- Ranally city rating system
