= Bennett Valley Fire District =

Operational area
- Country: United States
- State: California
- Address: 6161 Bennett Valley Rd

Agency overview
- Established: 1948 - 2019
- Staffing: Career & Volunteer

Facilities and equipment
- Stations: 1
- Engines: 2
- Rescues: 1
- Tenders: 1
- Wildland: 1 - Type 3

Website
- Official website

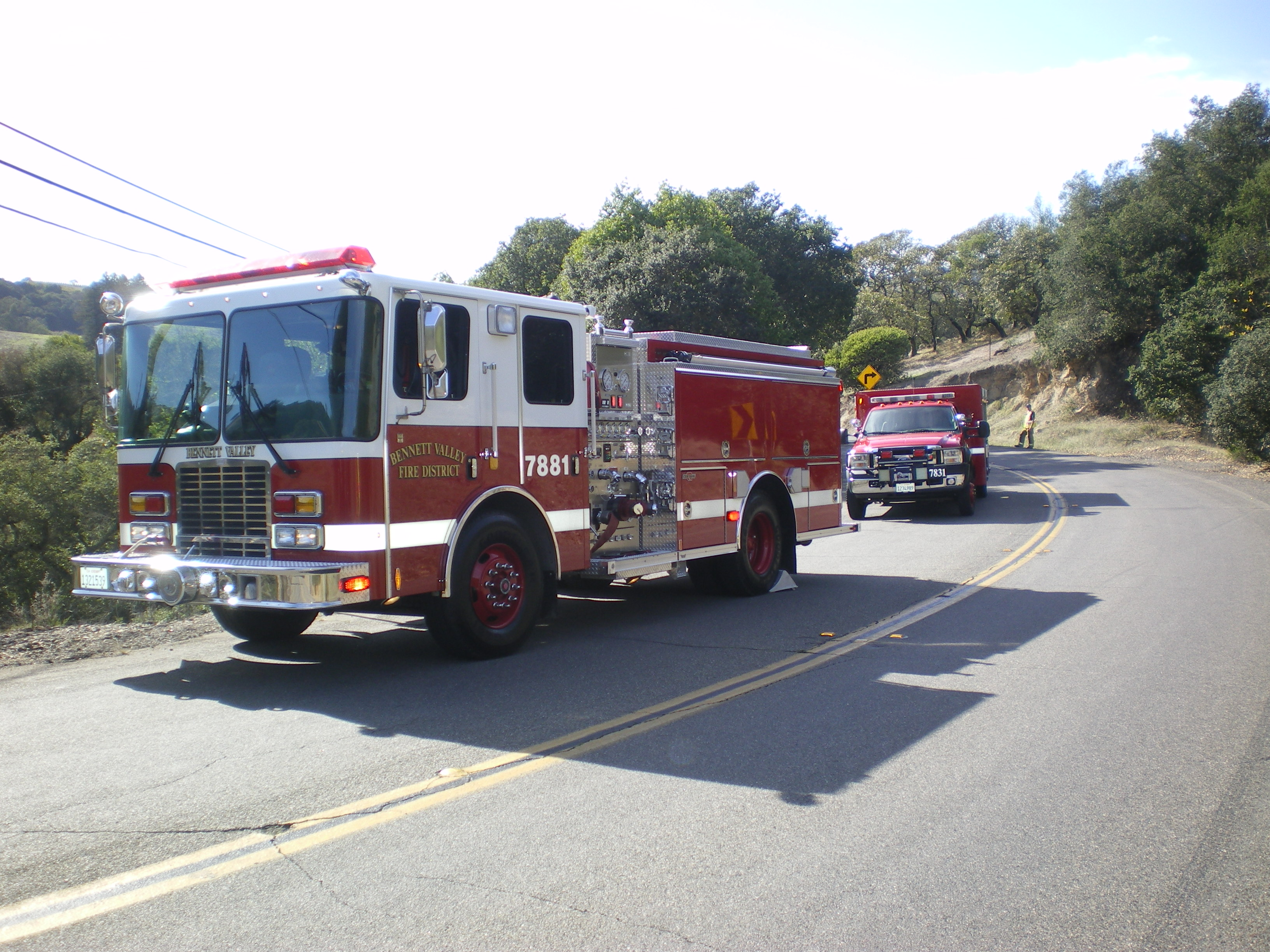
7881 & 7831 at the scene of a vehicle wreck

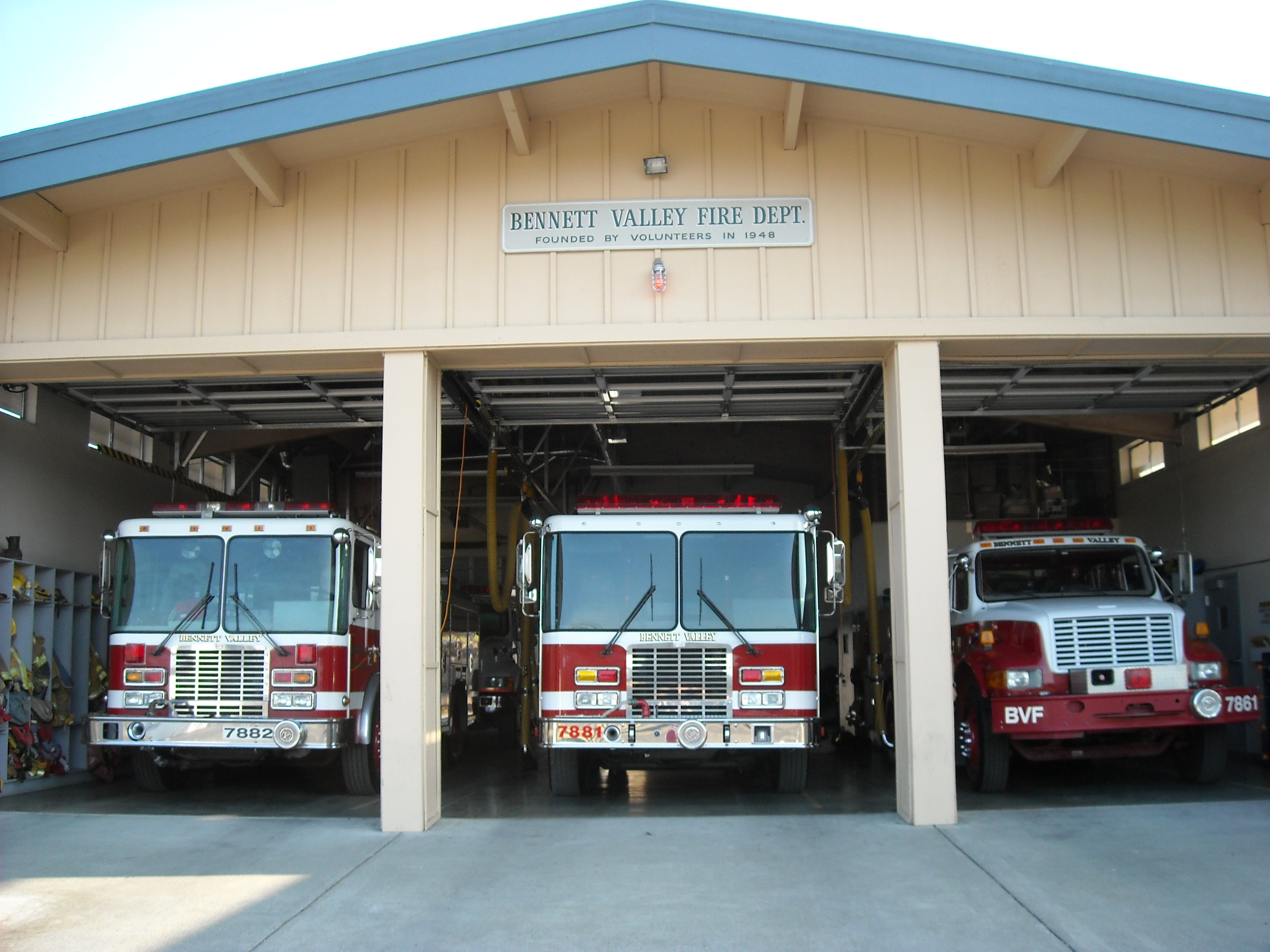
Bennett Valley Fire

The Bennett Valley Fire District (BVFPD) was a Fire Protection District that provided fire protection, emergency medical services and hazard mitigation to the unincorporated area of southeast Santa Rosa outside of the city limits in Bennett Valley, California. The district encompassed approximately 25 square miles (65 km^{2}) and 1200 homes. Additionally, The BVFD responded to Trione-Annadel State Park for fire and medical emergencies. Bennett Valley Fire had a memorandum of understanding (MOU) with the Gold Ridge Fire Protection District (a separate special district also located in Sonoma County, California) which allowed for sharing of overhead and staff. Bennett Valley Fire Protection District worked in close coordination with its surrounding fire districts/departments and provided mutual aid for multiple alarm incidents, cover assignments, and various emergencies.

The BVFD was formed in 1948 as an all volunteer fire department. The fire station was nothing more than a shed near the corner of Sonoma Mountain Road and Bennett Valley Road. In the 1960s a new station was constructed at the current location on Bennett Valley Road by volunteers. In 2002, residents voted to approve a parcel tax that would pay for career firefighters. This transitioned the department from all volunteer to a mix of volunteer and paid staff. The department had a paid lieutenant and Engineer on duty 24 hours per day. Additionally a firefighter was on duty from 8 a.m. – 5 p.m. daily. From 5 p.m. to 8 a.m. two trained volunteers staffed the station, sleeping there over night. In late 2018 the Bennett Valley Fire District entered in to talks with Rincon Valley Fire District, Windsor Fire District, and Sonoma County Board of Supervisors (representing Mountain Volunteer Fire Company/ CSA 40) in consolidating into a single regional Fire District named Sonoma County Fire District. Talks were focused around improved staffing, training, improved emergency response, and sustained financial capabilities. In April 2019 the Bennett Valley Fire District through a unanimous vote by its board was dissolved and officially annexed into the Sonoma County Fire District.

== Fire apparatus ==
The BVFD had a total of 6 fire apparatus at their station.

- Engine 7881 - A Type 1 fire engine
- Engine 7882 - A Type 1 fire engine
- Rescue 7831 - A light rescue built on a Ford F-150
- Engine 7861 - A type 3 fire engine
- Tender 7891 - A Type 2 water tender
- Utility 7841 - A multipurpose GMC Sierra.
