= Premier Hazard =

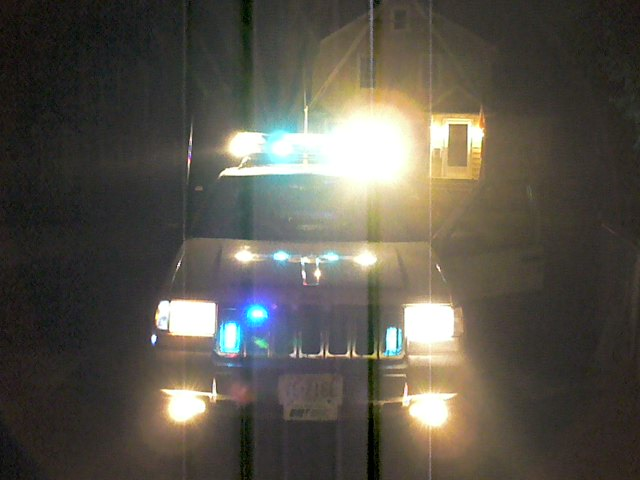
Vehicle with lightbar

Premier Hazard is a manufacturer of emergency vehicle warning equipment, based in Bridlington, East Riding of Yorkshire, England.

They develop and manufacture sirens, lightbars, beacons and other vehicle electrical equipment for emergency service vehicles such as Police, Fire, Ambulance, utility, and recovery vehicles. Many new Police, Fire and Ambulance vehicles manufactured by SVP (Specialist Vehicle Preparartion) have Premier Hazard Systems installed. This usually consists of a Controller and Control pad which allows the user to switch 'Siren', 'Rear Reds', 'Rear Blues', '360 only', and 'Flash Headlamps' function. As well as user defined processes such as 'Alley Lamps' and 'Run Lock' (Run Lock allows the engines to continue to run without the need for keys in the ignition) to avoid the vehicle being stolen whilst attending an incident.

The lamps are then fitted, typically for a Police vehicle they will have an external roof lightbar, blue repeaters and flashing headlamp relays. The siren can also be controlled by the original vehicles horn switch (steering wheel). This is only activated when the '999' or 'Siren' button is depressed on the controller inside the vehicle.

Other products include the unique 360 degree camera bar that allows for pan, tilt & zoom function in addition to a series of DVR's that cover simple recording to operation, viewing & recording from a remote site using 3G, WiFi & GPS networks. Also, a lightbar mounted info sign with CD that allows the customer to pre-programme up to 80 messages in different forms; e.g. flashing, scrolling etc.

== Market ==
They market their products in the UK, EEC, Russia, Middle East and Far East Asia - Hong Kong, Malaysia, Singapore, and Thailand.
