= Emergency vehicle =

Vehicle used by emergency services, typically with emergency lights and sirens

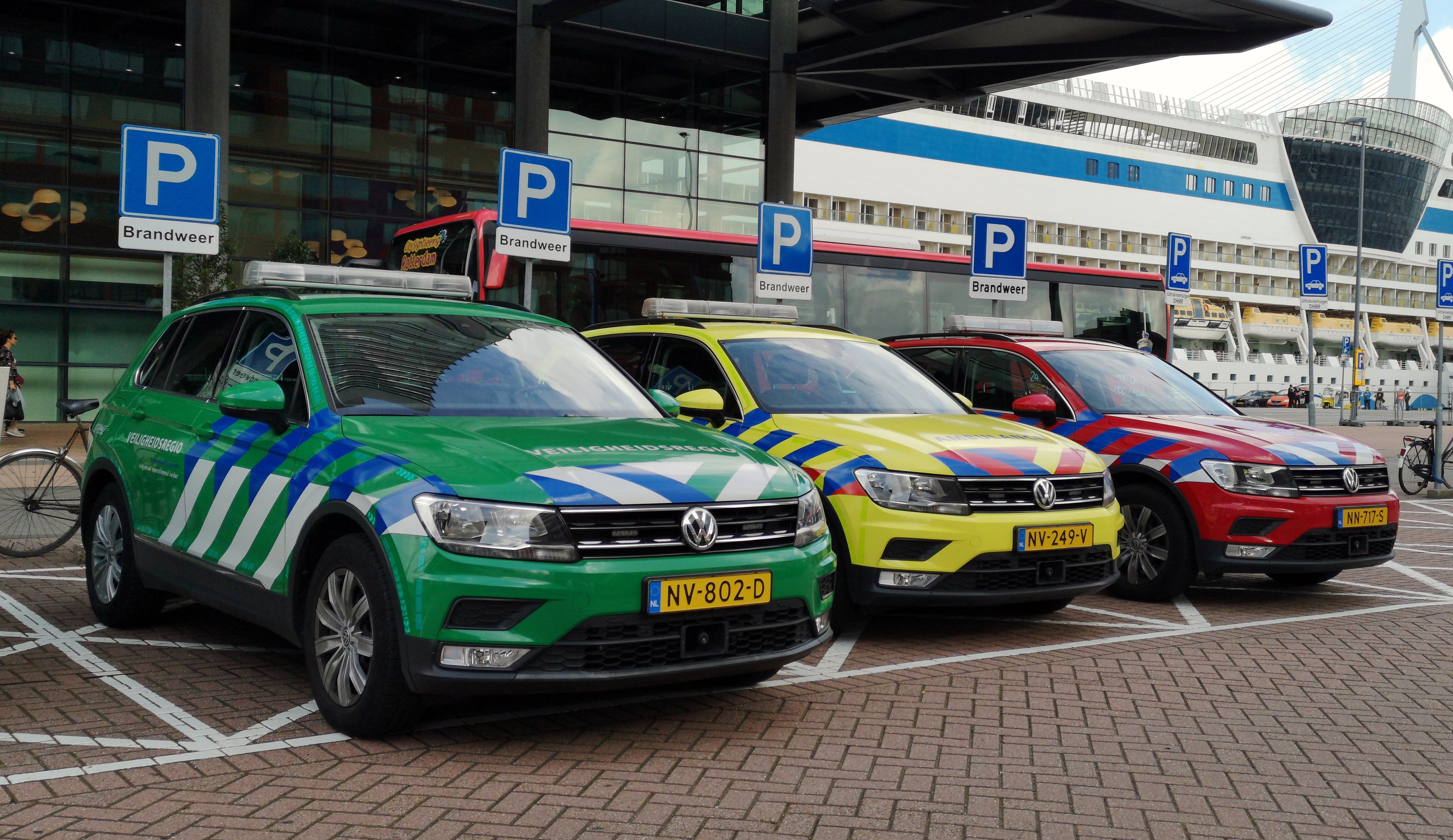
Safety region (public security), paramedic, and fire brigade Volkswagen Tiguan emergency vehicles in the Netherlands

An emergency vehicle is a vehicle used by emergency services. Emergency vehicles typically have specialized emergency lighting and vehicle equipment that allow emergency services to reach calls for service in a timely manner, transport equipment and resources, or perform their tasks efficiently. Emergency vehicles are usually operated by authorized government agencies, but some may also be operated by private entities where permitted by law.

Emergency vehicles are usually given right of way in traffic, and may be exempted from certain basic road laws to reach their destinations in the fastest possible time, such as driving through a red traffic light or exceeding the speed limit; however, this is almost always done with emergency lights and sirens on, to alert traffic that the emergency vehicle is approaching. In some jurisdictions, the driver of an emergency vehicle can face legal action if the driver shows "reckless disregard for the safety of others".

== Types ==
There are many types of emergency vehicles. Which service operates which vehicle depends on the jurisdiction. Examples of emergency vehicles include:

- Police force
  - Police car
  - Police van
  - Police motorcycle
  - Police bicycle
  - Police armoured vehicle
  - Mobile communications vehicle
  - Police bus
  - Police aviation
  - Police watercraft
  - Mounted police
- Fire department
  - Fire engine
  - Airport crash tender
  - Wildland fire engine
  - Quint
  - Fire command vehicle
  - Fire motorcycle
  - Light and air unit
  - Water tender
  - Wildland water tender
  - Firefighting aircraft
  - Fireboat
  - Fire train
  - Rescue vehicle
- Emergency medical services
  - Ambulance
  - Ambulance bus
  - Bariatric ambulance
  - Combination car
  - Nontransporting EMS vehicle
  - Motorcycle ambulance
  - Rail ambulance
  - Air medical services
  - Water ambulance
- Other
  - Bomb disposal vehicle
  - Internal security vehicle
  - Military police vehicle
  - Military vehicle
  - Hazardous materials apparatus
  - Tow truck
  - Personally-owned vehicles

== Equipment ==
An Ottawa Fire Services fire engine responding through traffic with its emergency lights and sirens

Many emergency response vehicles (especially those of the main police, fire, and medical services) are likely to be fitted with audible and visual warning devices, which are designed to facilitate their movement through traffic to reach their destination, and to provide some protection on the scene.

Depending on local laws, other vehicles on the road—either those in the lanes the emergency vehicle is on, those on the side of the road the emergency vehicle is traveling on, or all vehicles on both sides of the road—may be required to yield the right of way and travel slower, if not fully stop, for emergency vehicles with their warning devices enabled, at least until it has passed through. Exemptions may sometimes be made to this, such as if yielding would cause an accident or if the vehicles are stopped at a red light or stop sign. Even in jurisdictions where no such laws exist, many motorists may allow the emergency vehicle to pass as a matter of courtesy.

== Livery ==
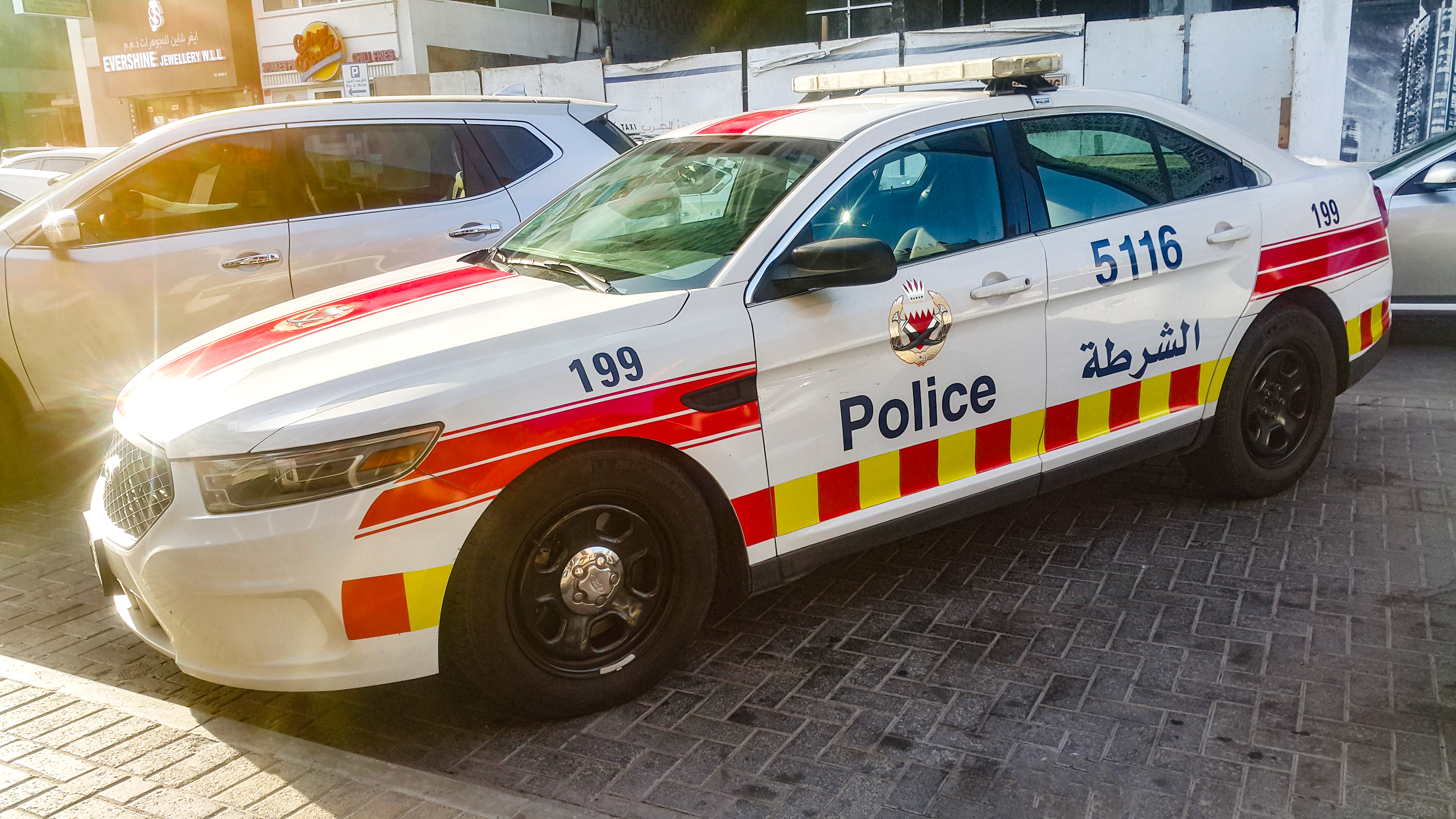
A police car with identifying symbols, an ID number, high visibility markings, and an emergency number in Bahrain

Liveries are graphic designs on emergency vehicles that are intended to identify the vehicle's respective emergency service, improve visual identification, and differentiate emergency vehicles from regular traffic. Each service's design choices reflect different needs, but typically include:

- Identification of the service: Text or logos identifying the emergency service to which the vehicle belongs, and its purpose to the public and other services. Occasionally, the name of the service ("police", "ambulance", etc.) may be written in reverse lettering on the front of the vehicle; this lettering is reflected properly in rear-view mirrors.
- Vehicle ID number: A fleet number or unit number, typically printed on the roof, trunk, or fender of the emergency vehicle, simplifying internal identification and fleet maintenance.
- High visibility markings: A design or paint scheme that makes the emergency vehicle distinct or highly visible, and thus easily identifiable as an emergency vehicle from a distance. These can be as simple as unique paint schemes (such as black and white for police, or bright red for fire) or stripes, or as complex as Battenburg markings or intricate images evoking the jurisdiction they serve. Police sometimes partially detract from this, with unmarked police cars that lack markings and resemble civilian traffic, though these rarely make up the majority of a fleet and are almost always paired with marked vehicles.
- Contact information: Appropriate contact information for the emergency service operating the emergency vehicle, or appropriate methods to request their assistance. The most common contact information printed on an emergency vehicle is an emergency telephone number, usually a national uniform number, but also a service's respective dedicated emergency number if they have one. The service's phone number or website link may also be used, though these are generally less emphasized so as to not confuse people who may be unfamiliar with a jurisdiction's emergency contact methods.

== See also ==
- Automotive safety
- ISO 9001 certification
- ISO 14001 certification
- Emergency management
- Safety car
- Vehicle recovery
