= Emergency vehicle equipment in the United Kingdom =

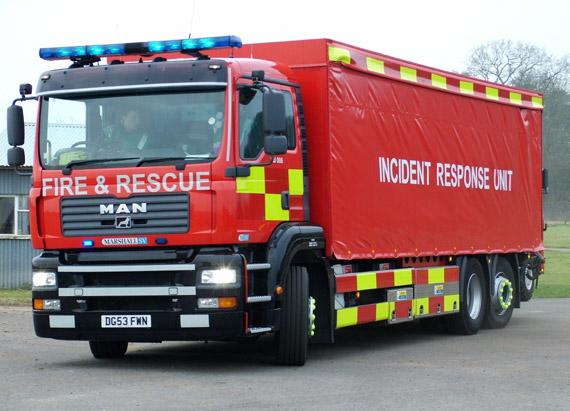
An Incident Response Unit operated by Norfolk Fire and Rescue Service with a blue lightbar on top, alternately flashing LED lights on the front, and flashing headlights. This vehicle is part of the New Dimension programme and consequently does not carry any insignia of Norfolk Fire and Rescue Service.

Electronic sirens have replaced two-tone horns on most emergency vehicles

Emergency vehicle equipment is used in the United Kingdom to indicate urgent journeys by an emergency service. This usage is colloquially known as "blues and twos", which refers to the blue lights and the two-tone siren once commonplace (although most sirens now have a range of tones like Wail, Yelp, Phaser, and Hi-Lo). A call-out requiring the use of lights and sirens is often colloquially known as a "blue light run". From 1993 to 1998, a television documentary following Britain's emergency services was titled Blues and Twos for this reason.

== Permitted use ==
Legislation that regulates blue flashing lights and sirens
- The Road Vehicles Lighting Regulations 1989; Road Vehicle Construction and Use Regulations 1986; Road Vehicles Lighting (Amendment) Regulations 2005; The Road Vehicles (Construction and Use)(Amendment)( No.2) Regulations 2005; Serious Organised Crime and Police Act 2005 (Consequential and Supplementary Amendments to Secondary Legislation) Order 2006; Road Vehicles (Construction and Use)(Amendment)(No.4) Regulations 2009; Road Vehicles Lighting and Goods Vehicles (Plating and Testing) (Amendment) Regulations 2009; Road Traffic Exemptions (Special Forces) (Variation and Amendment) Regulations 2011; Section 50 of the Deregulation Act 2015; Schedule 9 of the Deregulation Act 2015; Road Vehicles Lighting Regulations (Northern Ireland) 2000; Motor Vehicles (Construction and Use) Regulations (Northern Ireland) 1999; The Road Vehicles Lighting (Amendment) Regulations (Northern Ireland) 2007; The Road Vehicles Lighting (Amendment No. 3) Regulations (Northern Ireland) 2011

In Great Britain, the use of blue lights is regulated by the Road Vehicles Lighting Regulations 1989, and sirens by the Road Vehicles Construction and Use Regulations 1986, both of which have been amended by various other pieces of legislation (see right).

Regulation 16 of the Road Vehicle Lighting Regulations 1989 state that no vehicle, other than an emergency vehicle (or a vehicle used for special forces purposes), shall be fitted with a "blue warning beacon or special warning lamp", or a device which resembles a blue warning beacon or a special warning lamp, whether it works or not.

Similarly, Regulation 37(4) of the Road Vehicle Construction and Use Regulations 1986 prohibit vehicles from having a siren, bell, gong, or two-tone horn, unless the vehicle met the conditions of paragraph 5 (for emergency vehicles).

Northern Ireland on the other hand has the Road Vehicle Lighting Regulations (Northern Ireland) 2000 and the Motor Vehicles (Construction and Use) Regulations (Northern Ireland) 1999.

=== Great Britain ===
Type of vehicle	Blue flashing lights	Sirens	Other exemptions
used for police purposes	The Road Vehicles Lighting Regulations 1989	The Road Vehicles (Construction and Use) Regulations 1986	Yes
used for National Crime Agency purposes	The Serious Organised Crime and Police Act 2005 (Consequential and Supplementary Amendments to Secondary Legislation) Order 2006	The Serious Organised Crime and Police Act 2005 (Consequential and Supplementary Amendments to Secondary Legislation) Order 2006	Yes
used for Scottish Fire and Rescue Service purposes or fire and rescue authority purposes in England or Wales	The Road Vehicles Lighting Regulations 1989	The Road Vehicles (Construction and Use) Regulations 1986	Yes
used for: ambulance purposes, or; for the purpose of providing a response to an emergency at the request of an NHS ambulance service (which includes motorbikes, "fast response" cars and similar)	The Deregulation Act 2015	The Deregulation Act 2015	Yes
an ambulance, being a vehicle (other than an invalid carriage) which is constructed or adapted for the purposes of conveying sick, injured or disabled persons and which is used for such purposes	The Road Vehicles Lighting Regulations 1989	The Road Vehicles (Construction and Use) Regulations 1986	Yes
owned by a body formed primarily for the purposes of fire salvage and used for those or similar purposes	The Road Vehicles Lighting Regulations 1989	The Road Vehicles (Construction and Use) Regulations 1986	No
owned by: the Forestry Commission or by a local authority; Natural Resources Wales for the purposes of its functions relating to forestry and woodlands; the Scottish Ministers for the purposes of their functions under the Forestry and Land Management (Scotland) Act 2018 (i.e. Forestry and Land Scotland); and used from time to time for the purposes of fighting fires	The Road Vehicles Lighting Regulations 1989	The Road Vehicles (Construction and Use) Regulations 1986	No
owned or operated by the Secretary of State for Defence and used: for the purposes of the disposal of bombs or explosives; for the purposes of any activity which prevents or decreases the exposure of persons to radiation arising from a radiation accident or radiation emergency, or in connection with an event which could lead to a radiation accident or radiation emergency; by the Royal Air Force Mountain Rescue Service for the purposes of rescue operations or any other emergencies	The Road Vehicles Lighting (Amendment) Regulations 2005	The Road Vehicles (Construction and Use)(Amendment)( No.2) Regulations 2005	Some
owned or operated by the Secretary of State for Defence and used by United Kingdom Special Forces in response, or for training or practice in responding, to a national security emergency	The Road Traffic Exemptions (Special Forces) (Variation and Amendment) Regulations 2011	The Road Traffic Exemptions (Special Forces) (Variation and Amendment) Regulations 2011	Yes
primarily used for the purposes of the Blood Transfusion Service provided under the National Health Service Act 1977 or under the National Health Service (Scotland) Act 1978	The Road Vehicles Lighting Regulations 1989	The Road Vehicles (Construction and Use) Regulations 1986	Some
used by His Majesty's Coastguard or Coastguard Auxiliary Service for the purposes of giving aid to persons in danger or vessels in distress on or near the coast	The Road Vehicles Lighting Regulations 1989	The Road Vehicles (Construction and Use) Regulations 1986	No
used for the purposes of rescue operations at mines	The Road Vehicles Lighting Regulations 1989	The Road Vehicles (Construction and Use) Regulations 1986	No
owned by the Royal National Lifeboat Institution and used for the purposes of launching lifeboats	The Road Vehicles Lighting Regulations 1989	The Road Vehicles (Construction and Use) Regulations 1986	No exemptions. However, as it is only lifeboat launching vehicles that are classed as emergency vehicles and with all but a handful of these vehicles being slow moving tractors that move lifeboats across roads and beaches to access the sea it is highly unlikely they will ever need to use exemptions in the course of their emergency duties in any case.
primarily used for the purposes of conveying any human tissue for organ transplant or similar purposes	The Road Vehicles Lighting Regulations 1989	No	No
under the lawful control of the Commissioners for His Majesty's Revenue and Customs and used from time to time for the purposes of the investigation of serious crime	The Road Vehicles Lighting (Amendment) Regulations 2005	The Road Vehicles (Construction and Use) (Amendment) (No.2) Regulations 2005	No
used for mountain rescue purposes	The Road Vehicles Lighting and Goods Vehicles (Plating and Testing) (Amendment) Regulations 2009	The Road Vehicles (Construction and Use) (Amendment) (No.4) Regulations 2009	No exemptions for Mountain Rescue purposes alone; unless coupled with police purposes for all mountain rescue purpose vehicles except mountain rescue ambulances, while mountain rescue ambulances may couple mountain rescue purposes with "an ambulance, being a vehicle (other than an invalid carriage) which is constructed or adapted for the purposes of conveying sick, injured or disabled persons and which is used for such purposes" and/or ambulance purposes
used for the purpose of training drivers for the use of blue lights for any of the above purposes.	The Road Vehicle Lighting Regulations 1989	The Road Vehicles (Construction and Use) Regulations 1986	Some

=== Northern Ireland ===
Type of vehicle	Blue flashing lights	Sirens	Other exemptions
A vehicle used for fire and rescue authority purposes	The Road Vehicles Lighting (Amendment No. 3) Regulations (Northern Ireland) 2011	The Motor Vehicles (Construction and Use) Regulations (Northern Ireland) 1999	Yes
A vehicle used for ambulance purposes	The Road Vehicles Lighting Regulations (Northern Ireland) 2000	The Motor Vehicles (Construction and Use) Regulations (Northern Ireland) 1999	Yes
A vehicle used for police purposes	The Road Vehicles Lighting Regulations (Northern Ireland) 2000	The Motor Vehicles (Construction and Use) Regulations (Northern Ireland) 1999	Yes
An ambulance, being a vehicle (other than an invalid carriage) which is constructed or adapted for the purposes of conveying sick, injured or disabled persons and which is used for such purposes	The Road Vehicles Lighting Regulations (Northern Ireland) 2000	The Motor Vehicles (Construction and Use) Regulations (Northern Ireland) 1999	Yes
A cardiac response vehicle, being a vehicle used only for the purposes of transporting medical or nursing personnel and equipment to cardiac incidents	The Road Vehicles Lighting Regulations (Northern Ireland) 2000	The Motor Vehicles (Construction and Use) Regulations (Northern Ireland) 1999	Yes
A vehicle owned by a body formed primarily for the purposes of fire salvage and used for those or similar purposes	The Road Vehicles Lighting Regulations (Northern Ireland) 2000	The Motor Vehicles (Construction and Use) Regulations (Northern Ireland) 1999	?
A vehicle owned by the Department of Agriculture and used from time to time for the purposes of fighting fires	The Road Vehicles Lighting Regulations (Northern Ireland) 2000	The Motor Vehicles (Construction and Use) Regulations (Northern Ireland) 1999	?
A vehicle owned or operated by the Secretary of State for Defence and used-: for the purposes of the disposal of bombs or explosives; for the purposes of any activity which prevents or decreases the exposure of persons to radiation arising from a radiation emergency, or in connection with an event which could lead to a radiation emergency; by the Royal Air Force Mountain Rescue Service for the purposes of rescue operations or other emergencies	The Road Vehicles Lighting (Amendment) Regulations (Northern Ireland) 2007	The Motor Vehicles (Construction and Use) Regulations (Northern Ireland) 1999 Note: Only vehicles owned or operated by the Secretary of State for Defence and used for radiation emergency purposes are not included in this law	?
A vehicle primarily used for the purposes of the Blood Transfusion Service provided under Article 10(1)(d) of the Health and Personal Social Services (Northern Ireland) Order 1972	The Road Vehicles Lighting Regulations (Northern Ireland) 2000	The Motor Vehicles (Construction and Use) Regulations (Northern Ireland) 1999	?
A vehicle used by Her Majesty's Coastguard or Coastguard Auxiliary Service for the purposes of giving aid to persons in danger or vessels in distress on or near the coast	The Road Vehicles Lighting Regulations (Northern Ireland) 2000	The Motor Vehicles (Construction and Use) Regulations (Northern Ireland) 1999	?
A vehicle owned by the Royal National Lifeboat Institution and used for the purposes of launching lifeboats	The Road Vehicles Lighting Regulations (Northern Ireland) 2000	The Motor Vehicles (Construction and Use) Regulations (Northern Ireland) 1999	?
A vehicle primarily used for the purposes of conveying any human tissue for transplanting or similar purposes	The Road Vehicles Lighting Regulations (Northern Ireland) 2000	No	?
A vehicle under the lawful control of the Commissioners for Her Majesty's Revenue and Customs and used from time to time for the purposes of the investigation of serious crime ( which, save for the omission of the words "and, where the authorising officer is within subsection (5)(h), it relates to an assigned matter within the meaning of section 1(1) of the Customs and Excise Management Act 1979”, has the meaning given in section 93(4) of the Police Act 1997).	The Road Vehicles Lighting (Amendment) Regulations (Northern Ireland) 2007	No	?
A search and rescue vehicle deployed on the authority of the Chief Constable on search and rescue operations	The Road Vehicles Lighting (Amendment No. 3) Regulations (Northern Ireland) 2011	No	?

Each of the emergency services listed above has different policies regarding the use of blue lights and sirens. Most require the driver to be trained to a particular standard in response driving, but currently, no national standard exists.

Provision exists for a national standard to be required in order to utilize speed limit exemptions, but this has not been brought into force.

== Road traffic exemptions ==
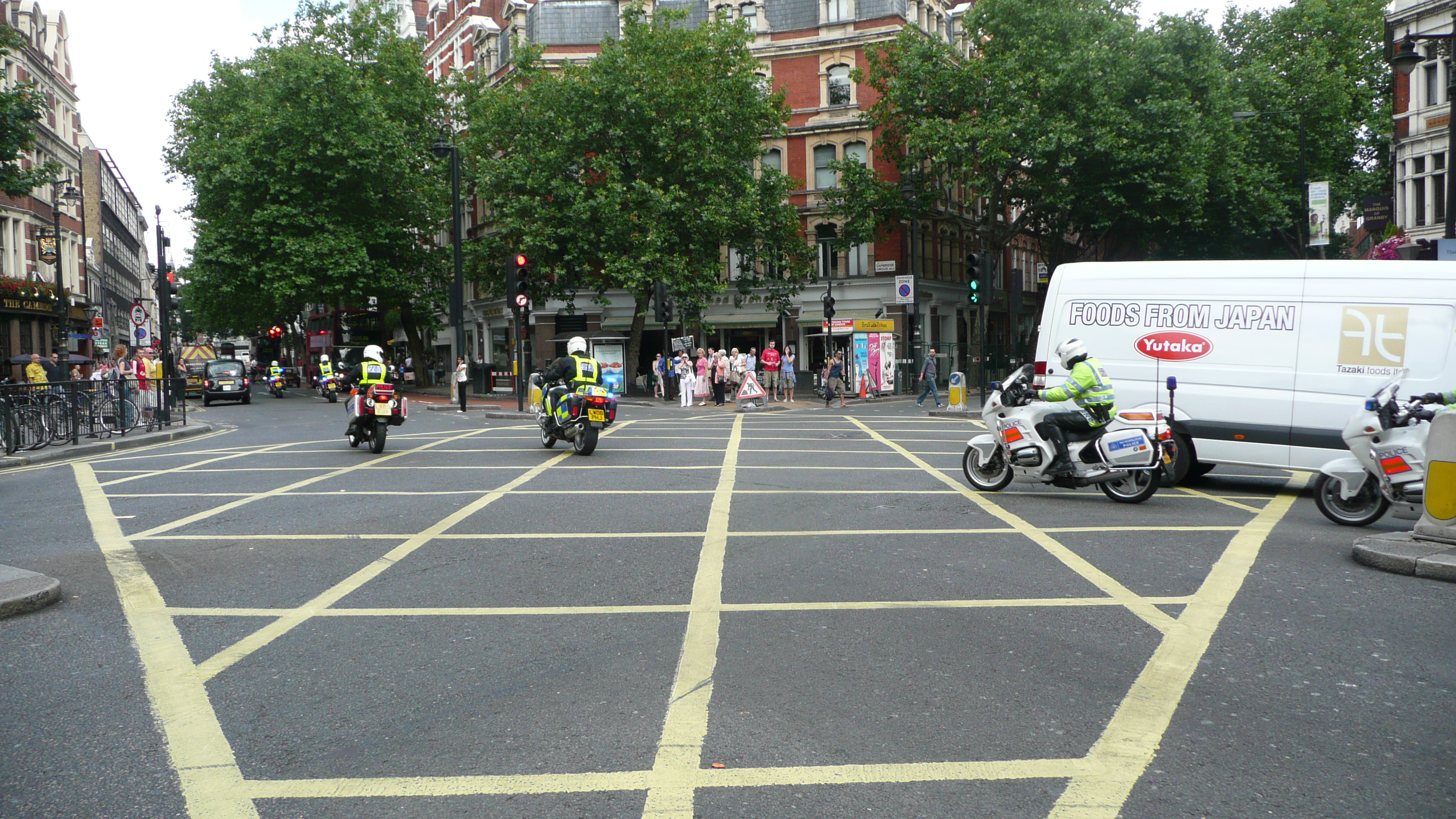
Six Metropolitan Police Service motorcycles driving with the blues and twos on. They can be seen breaking a number of normal traffic rules. Each motorbike has driven through a red light, and the motorbike on the far right can be seen driving on the wrong side of the road and passing on the right of a keep left sign.

In the UK, vehicles used for certain purposes may have exemptions from some road traffic regulations whilst responding to an emergency. Merely being authorized to use blue lights and sirens does not of itself grant exemptions from road traffic law. These exemptions apply whether or not blue lights and/or sirens are being used, although it is mainly desirable:

- treating a red traffic light as a give way sign
- passing to the right of a keep left sign or to the left of a keep right sign (but not disobeying a turn left, turn right, or ahead only sign)
- driving on a motorway hard shoulder (even against the direction of traffic)
- exceeding the statutory speed limit (police, fire and ambulance purposes only; and National Crime Agency purposes only, where the driver is trained or is being trained in high-speed driving)
- stopping on zig-zag lines
- parking in restricted areas, including against flow of traffic at night
- leaving the vehicle with the engine running, normally the offence of "quitting" (police and ambulance utilizing the run lock feature on most cars)
- using audible warnings outside permitted hours
- stopping and parking in a bus stop or bus stand clearway (but not using a bus lane) during hours of operation
- using a siren, bell, gong, or two-tone horn, whether the emergency vehicle is stationary or not

== See also ==
- Battenburg markings
- Code 3 Response
