= Gold Ridge Fire Protection District =

Fire protection district in Sebastopol, California

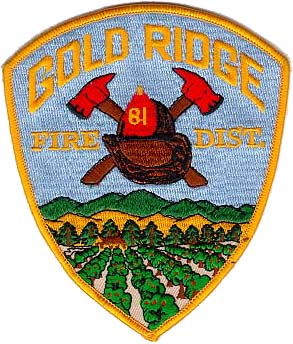

Operational area
- Country: United States
- State: California
- City: Sebastopol

Agency overview
- Established: 1993
- Annual calls: 1,100
- Staffing: Combination
- Fire chief: Shepley Schroth-Cary
- EMS level: BLS

Facilities and equipment
- Battalions: 1
- Stations: 3
- Engines: 2
- Tenders: 3
- Wildland: 4 - Type 3
- Light and air: 1

Website
- Official website

The Gold Ridge Fire Protection District is a special district governed by a board of directors, that provides fire protection and emergency medical services to much of western Sonoma County, including rural and unincorporated communities such as Lakeville, Bodega, Freestone, Hessel, Twin Hills, Valley Ford, and (after 2025) the City of Sebastopol. The district was formed in a merger and reorganization of the Twin Hills Fire District and the Hessel Fire District in 1993. The district includes approximately 75 sq mi (190 km^{2}) and serves a population of approximately 25,000. Gold Ridge Fire Protection District had a memorandum of understanding with the Bennett Valley Fire Protection District (a separate special district also located in Sonoma County) which allowed for sharing of overhead and staff that lasted for approximately 22 years and ended in 2019. Gold Ridge Fire Protection District works in close coordination with its surrounding fire districts/departments and provides automatic and mutual aid for all types of incidents and station cover assignments.

== Stations and apparatus ==
As of 2020, the district is home to three fire stations.

Fire Station Number	Address	Engine Company	Wildland Units	Water tender Units	Special Units
1	4500 Hessel Rd	Engine 8181	Engine 8161	Watertender 8191	Air Unit 8131, Utility 8141
2	1690 Watertrough Rd	Engine 8182	Engine 8162 Reserve Engine 8169	Watertender 8192	Battalion 8, Utility 8142
3	456 Bohemian Hwy		Engine 8163	Watertender 8193	

== Gallery ==
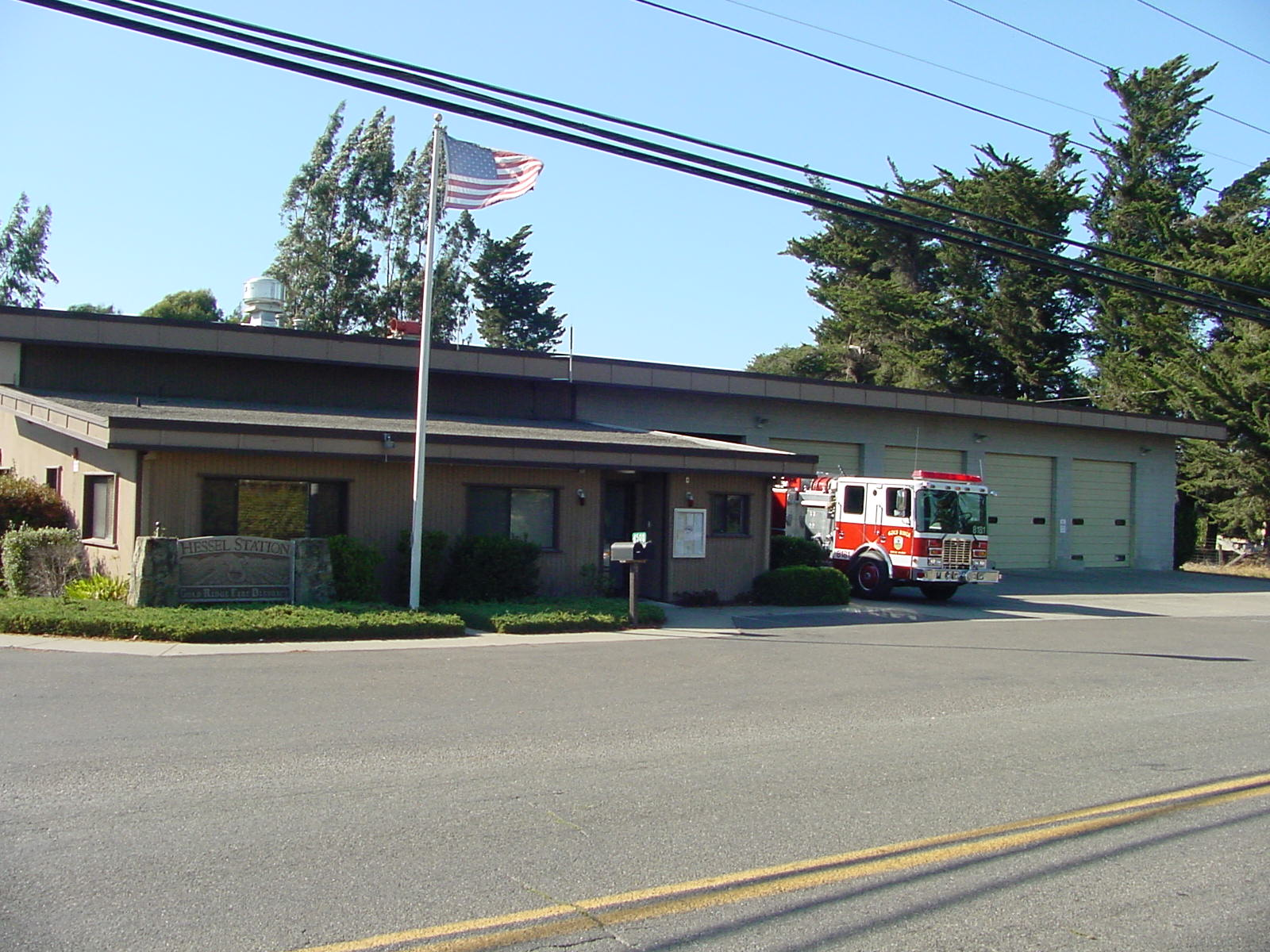
Station 1

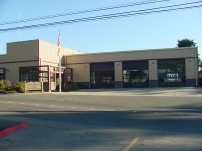
Station 2

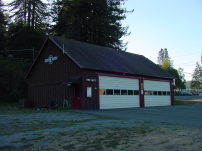
Station 3

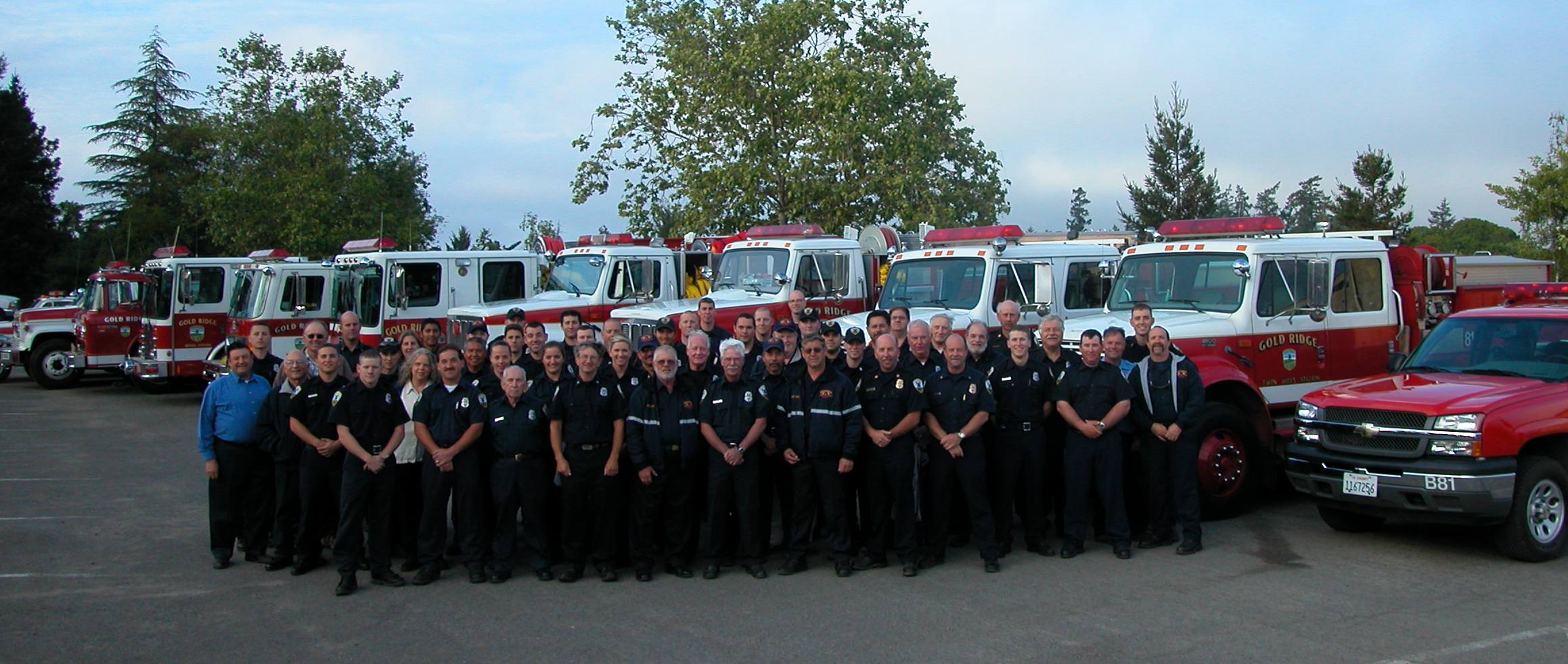
2006 District photograph
