= Emergency vehicle equipment =

Equipment used by emergency vehicles

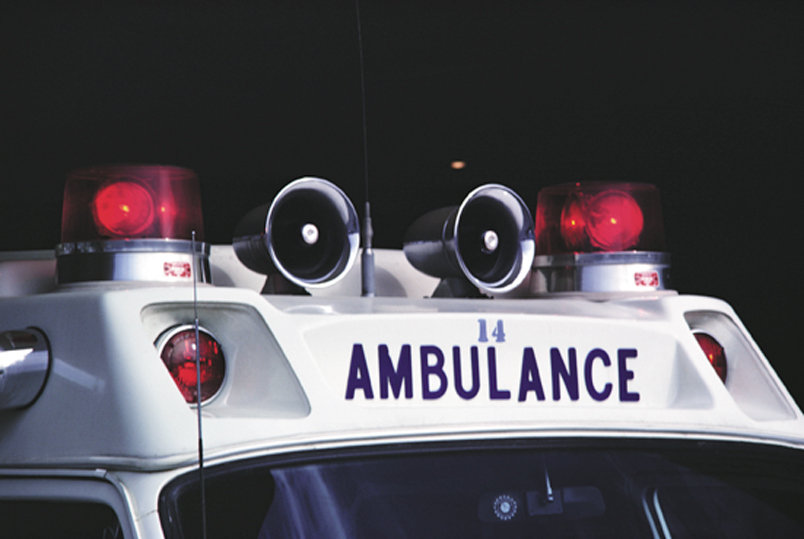
An ambulance with two red revolving lights (beacons) mounted above two flashing red lights, with two speakers between for the vehicle's electronic siren. Also seen are two antennae; the one seen between the two speakers is for a two-way radio, while the one seen in front of the flashing light on the left is probably for the vehicle's conventional AM/FM radio.

Emergency vehicle equipment is any equipment fitted to, or carried by, an emergency vehicle, other than the equipment that a standard non-emergency vehicle is fitted with (such as headlights, steering wheels, and windshield/windscreens).

== Visual warning devices ==
Emergency vehicles of any kind (fire truck, ambulance, police car) are highly likely to be involved in hazardous situations, including relatively common incidents such as a road traffic collision. They are also required to gain access to incidents as quickly as possible, and in many countries, are given dispensation from obeying certain traffic laws; for instance, they may be able to treat a red traffic light or stop sign as a give way, or be permitted to break the speed limit. However, emergency vehicles usually are not able to treat a railroad crossing as a give way, because a train cannot be warned in time to stop before the crossing to let the vehicle through. Hence, one of the few things emergency vehicles must yield to are heavy freight and passenger trains.

For these reasons, emergency vehicles in many countries worldwide, are fitted with visual warnings to alert members of the public (and in particular, other motorists and road users), either as they approach the vehicle, or it approaches them. Visual warnings can be of two types - passive warning or active warning.

=== Passive visual warnings ===
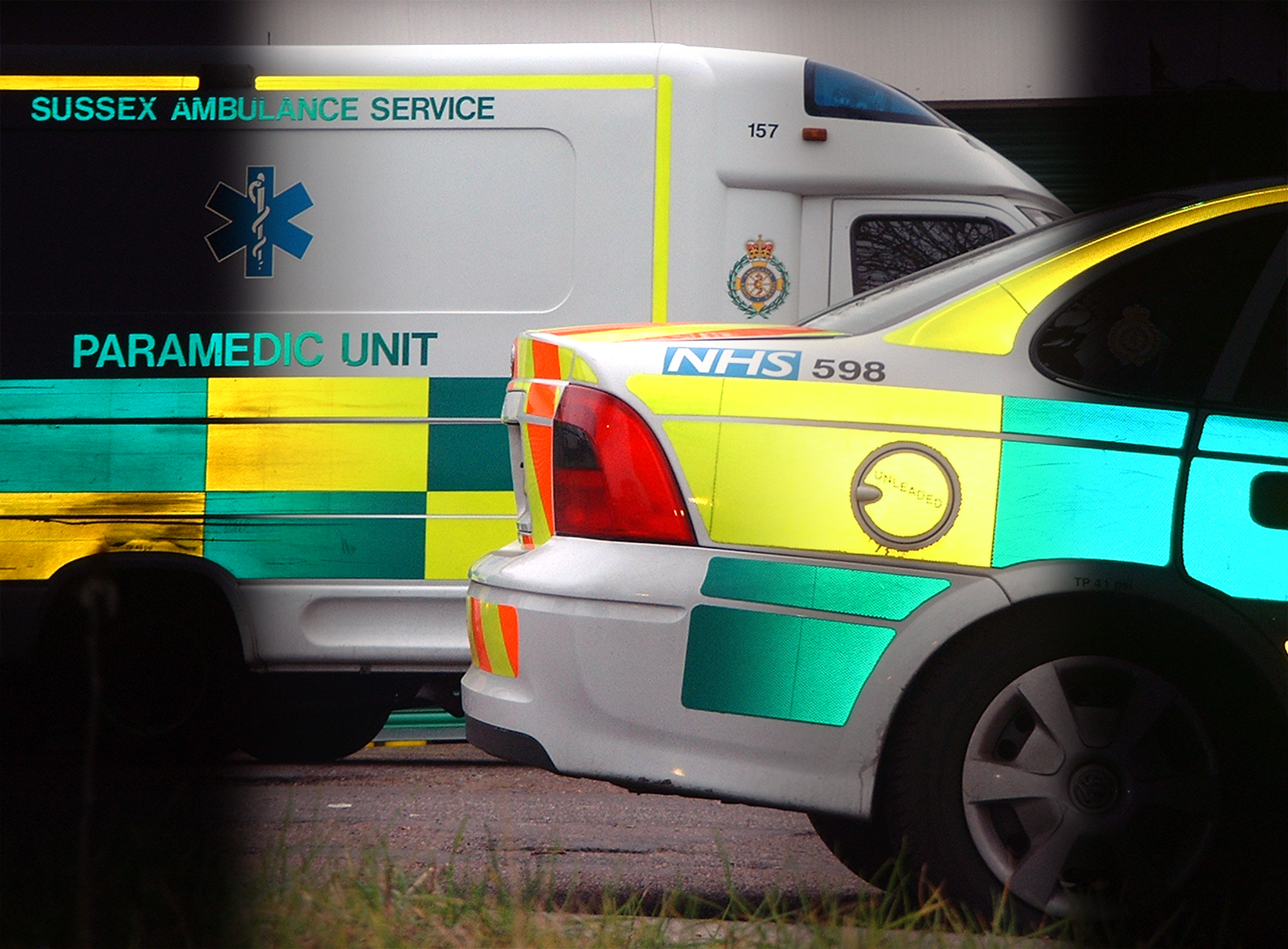
Composite picture of two ambulance vehicles in different light sources showing retroreflective high visibility battenburg markings in light and dark conditions

The passive visual warnings are usually inherently linked to the design of the vehicle, and involve the use of high contrast patterns. Older vehicles are more likely to have their pattern painted on, whereas modern vehicles generally carry the retro-reflective designs which reflect light from car headlights or torches (and was invented by 3M). Popular patterns include 'checker board' (alternate coloured squares, sometimes called 'Battenburg markings'), chevrons (arrowheads - often pointed towards the front of the vehicle if on the side, or pointing vertically upwards on the rear) or stripes (along the side - these were the first type or retro-reflective device introduced, as the original 3M reflective material only came in tape form). In some countries, in addition to retro-reflective markings, the vehicles are now painted in a bright yellow or orange colour underneath, in order to maximise visual impact.

Another passive marking form is the name of the emergency service spelled out in reverse on the front of the vehicle (e.g. Ambulance or Fire). This enables drivers of other vehicles to more easily identify an approaching emergency vehicle in their rear view mirrors. The vehicle may also display the name of their owner or operator, and a telephone number which may be used to summon the vehicle.

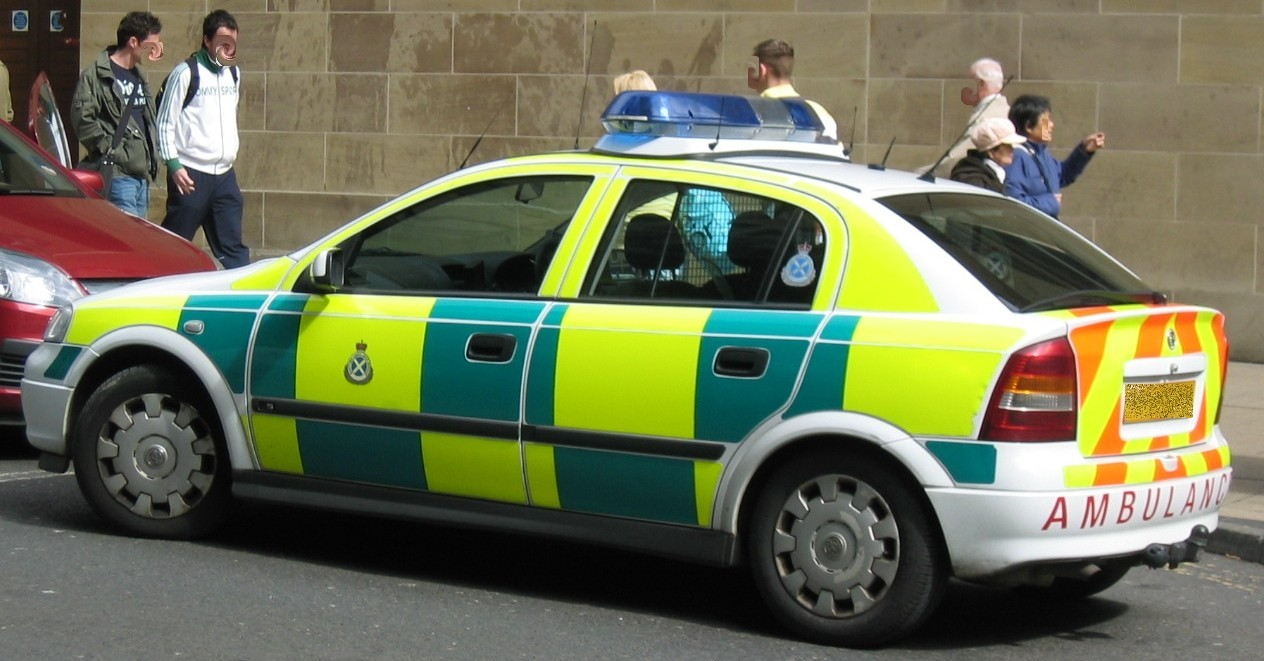
A British paramedic fly-car vehicle with high visibility Battenburg colour scheme, popular in the UK

Ambulances may also carry an emblem (either as part of the passive warning markings or not). Some ambulances may display a Red Cross, Red Crescent or Red Diamond (collective known as the Protective Symbols). These are symbols laid down by the Geneva Conventions, and all countries signatory to it agree to restrict their use to either (1) Military Ambulances or (2) the national Red Cross or Red Crescent society. Use by any other person, organisation or agency is in breach of international law. The protective symbols are designed to indicate to all people (especially combatants in the case of war) that the vehicle is neutral and is not to be fired upon (see Military ambulances), hence giving protection to the medics and their casualties, although this has not always been adhered to.

Many ambulances use the Star of Life, which indicates that the vehicle's operators can render their given level of care represented on the six pointed star.

=== Active visual warnings ===
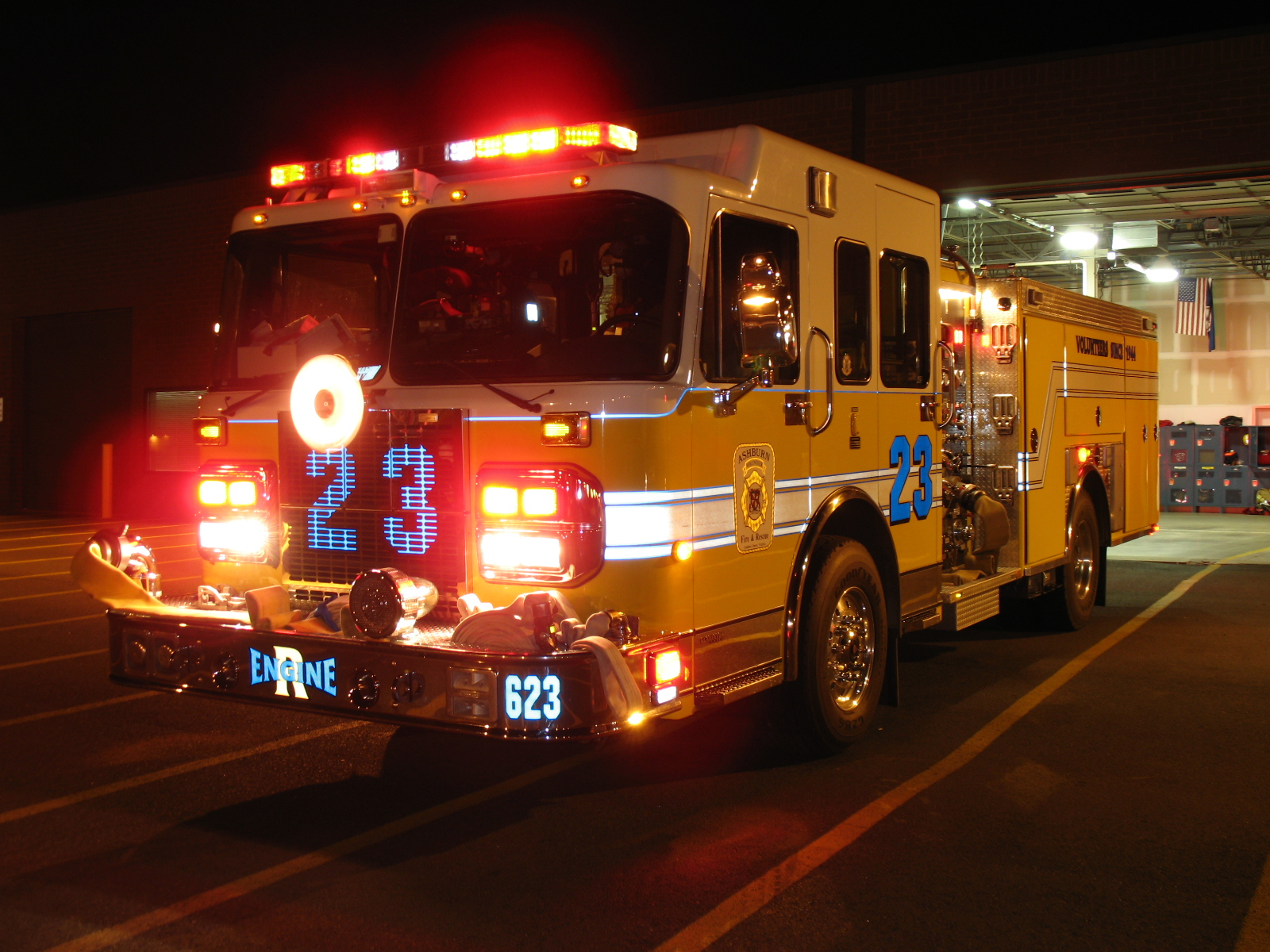
An American fire engine lit up at night. Notice the use of lights and reflective markings on the vehicle.

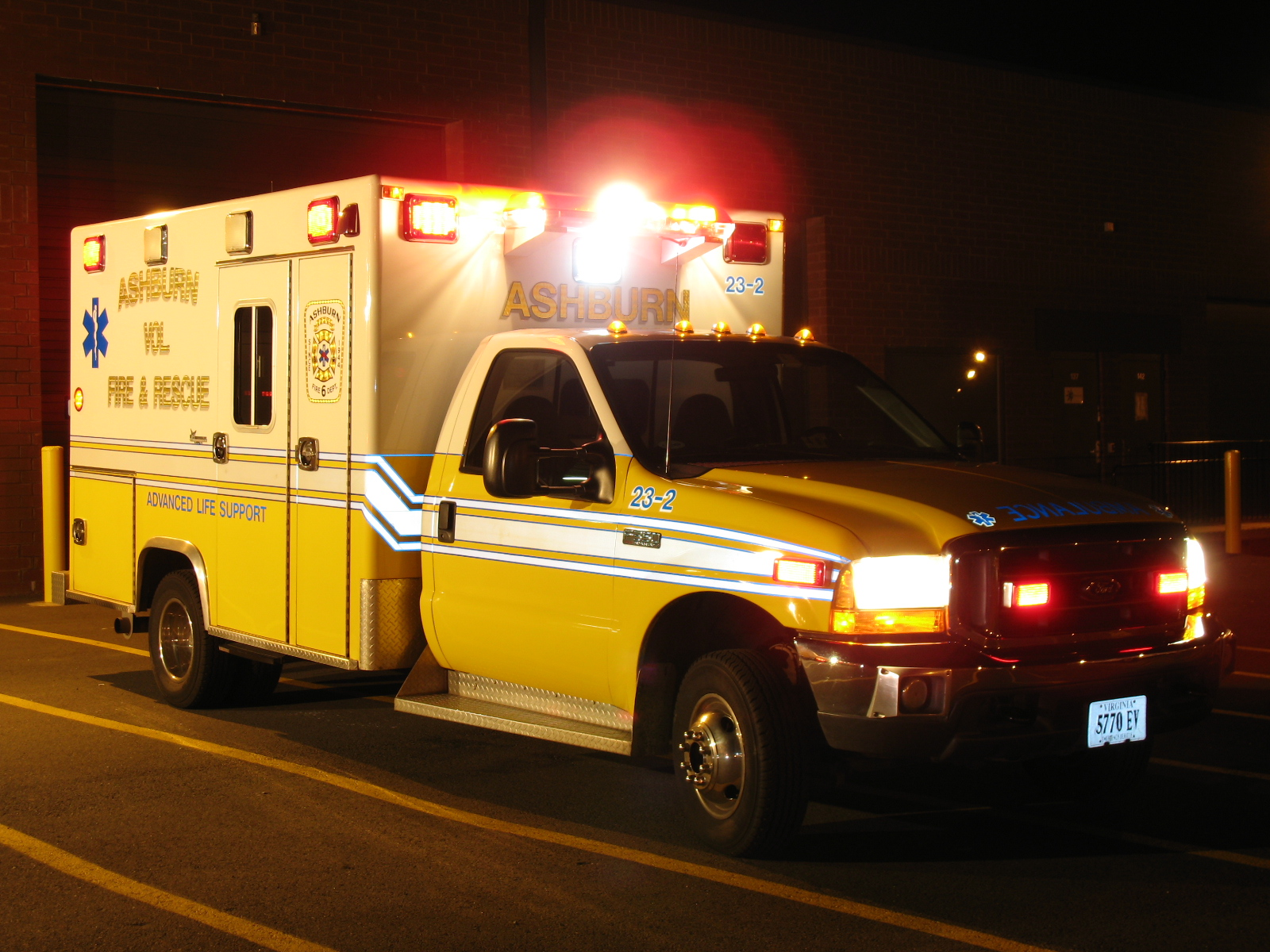
An American ambulance also with all its lights turned on

The active visual warnings are usually in the form of flashing coloured lights (also known as 'beacons' or 'lightbars'). These flash in order to attract the attention of other road users as the emergency vehicle approaches, or to provide warning to motorists approaching a stopped vehicle in a dangerous position on the road (and if the emergency vehicle positions itself to deliberately move people away from an incident, this is called fend off). Common colours for emergency vehicle warning beacons are blue and red, and this varies by country (and sometimes by operator).

The lights can be made to flash via a range of techniques, dependent on the technology used, and the desired end effect. Types of beacon include:

- Light bars - A long but narrow 'strip' of lights on top of an emergency vehicle, which can be configured with almost infinite combinations of different lighting technologies from the list below. These are typically the main source of flashing light for the vehicle, and are used on overt marked emergency vehicles. They can also be divided into sections, with an array of functions (for instance front blue flashing lights, and rear red flashing lights, switched separately). Due to the nature of the wind resistance encountered by these large units, the majority must be fixed to the car permanently, although some units (usually smaller) are available with either magnetic or suction cup mountings which can be removed. The Light bar may also contain the Audible Warning devices. Some jurisdictions disallow the sale of lightbars to the general public (especially if mandated under state and/or federal law regardless of lens coloring which are not red and blue).
- Beacons - A simple lighting device, often found on smaller emergency vehicles, or unmarked cars, (where it is removable) and consists of a clear or transparent coloured casing surrounding a lamp and a revolving mirror. Some beacons consist of one or several lamps that revolve, instead of using a mirror. These were the original type of emergency vehicle lighting
- Alternating Vehicle Lights or Wig-wags - This causes the Full beam headlights, or Fog lights to flash in a pattern (usually alternating left-right-left, although it can be together, or in a random pattern), and can also be used at the rear of the vehicle on Brake, Fog or reversing lights to warn vehicles approaching from the rear.
- Grille lights - Flashing lights fitted on, into or behind the grille of the emergency vehicle, creating forward-facing flashing effects, designed to be seen in the rear view mirror of moving traffic in front of the vehicle. These can be fitted to both overt and covert emergency vehicles, by simply changing whether they are mounted internally or externally, or by varying the lens colour (so that they may look like fog lights on a covert vehicle)
- Dash Lights - These are forward-facing lights, like grille lights, but mounted on the dashboard of the emergency vehicle. They are more often found on covert vehicles, but may be found on some marked vehicles which are trying to increase visibility. In order to avoid dazzling the driver, they are normally fitted with 'shields' around the light which stop the light reflecting into the cab.
- Deck lights (or Parcel Shelf lights) - Rear-facing equivalents of the Dash Lights which are placed on the Parcel Shelf of the vehicle. These can be used in both overt and covert vehicles.

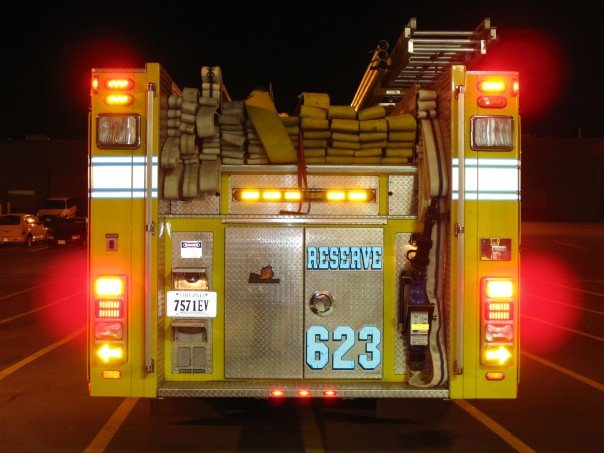
Directional warning arrows located in the centre of this fire engine

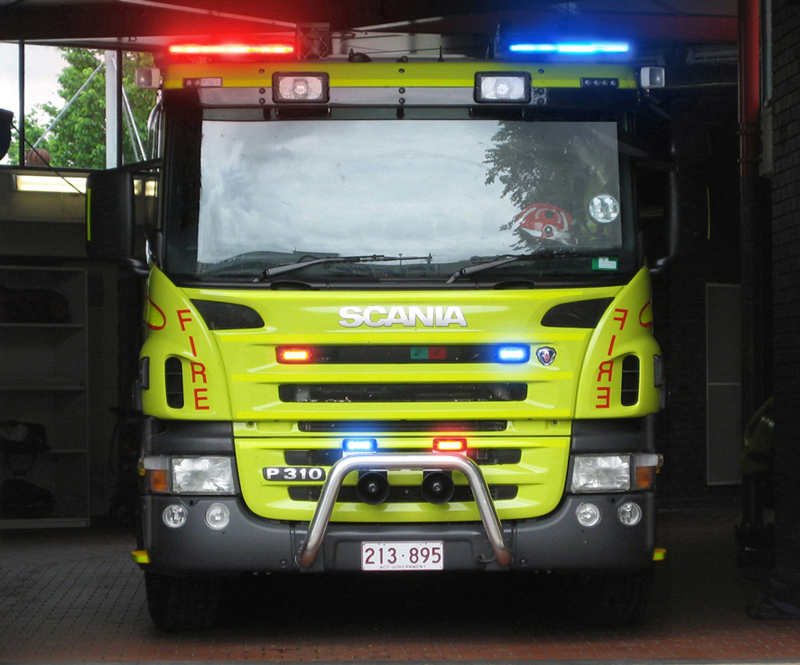
ACT Fire Brigade Heavy Rescue pumper with the emergency lights activated

- Directional Warning Arrows or arrow sticks - A strip of lights (typically amber or yellow) which light up in sequence to direct traffic to the right, left, or around both sides of an emergency vehicle. They may be found mounted on the back of a lightbar, on a car's package shelf (shining out the rear window) or on some other conspicuous location on the rear of a vehicle.
- Information Matrix Signs - These special active visual warnings are used to convey words to vehicles approaching from behind the emergency vehicle and often carry messages such as "Police. Stop" or other relevant message. Some systems allow only preprogrammed messages, where others can be fully customised.

Many governments list specific requirements for emergency vehicle lighting. These requirements may address the colour, location and intensity/visibility of the lights, and whether they should flash or burn steadily. Laws also may regulate what vehicles may display these lights, and under what circumstances they may do so.

The warning lights may be of several types, which includes:

- Incandescent - These are 'traditional' light bulbs, and may be found in the 'beacon' type lights, and will also be found where the vehicle's own lighting is used (such as wig-wag). Bulbs may be Halogen or Xenon type. They may use a rotating mirror to make them flash, or are simply turned on and off.
- Strobe lights - These lights give a short flash, which has high brightness compared to an incandescent light. They are usually made to work in multiples (such as three rapid flashes consecutively) and are often used in patterns between sets, which increases their effectiveness.
- LED lights - These are more recent developments, using the 'Super Bright' LED technology, and are entering wide use as they are easy to fit (being only a few millimetres wide, rather than several centimetres for most strobes and incandescent lights). This makes them particularly suitable for covert use. Though currently much more expensive than other types of lamps, there are substantial benefits. They draw much less electric current than other types of lamps which is a valuable reduction in electrical load on these vehicles' over-stressed electrical systems. They are much more resistant to vibration and have much longer service lives. They also present very saturated colors and so enhance visibility during daylight hours.

== Audible warning devices ==
The Whelen siren's wail, yelp and phaser tones are a familiar sound in many cities.

When an emergency vehicle is responding, it often uses audio warning devices in addition to the visual warnings provided by its warning lights. Audio warning devices are turned off once the vehicle is on-scene. Such devices include:

- Sirens - These can be fully electronic, electric, or manual, but are all designed to create changing sound patterns. These patterns vary by model of siren. Emergency drivers are often trained to use different siren tones in different conditions, to achieve maximum effectiveness through traffic. A long-standing problem for emergency services has been traffic being unable to determine the direction a siren is approaching from, and different tones have been developed on some electronic sirens to help combat this, such as the use of white noise or pink noise in between more conventional siren noises, which helps people to pinpoint their origin. Some sirens have dual tones. These tones are able to warn passing motorists or pedestrians to stay to the side as they pass by.
- Public address system - Sometimes linked to the electronic or electric siren, or possibly stand alone, this system allows the voice of the operator to be amplified to give direction. This is found especially useful in heavy pedestrian traffic.

A fire truck uses an air horn to alert cars of its presence.

- Air horn - These devices force compressed air from the vehicle's air brake system against a diaphragm, creating a loud noise. Air horns used on emergency vehicles usually have a distinctive tone so they can easily be distinguished from other large vehicles, commanding urgency. In Europe, they are sometimes used to create the classic two tone 'nee naw' sound which led to the colloquial expression for lights and sirens on emergency vehicles of blues and twos. Due to the need for compressed air in order to operate, they are primarily found in fire engines and large ambulances but not in police cars and other small vehicles since they do not contain air brakes. Most ambulances have electronic and electric horns that work in conjunction with the sirens to give a signal to clear the way.
- Bells - Usually found on older or classic emergency vehicles, these were the original methods of notifying people of the approach of emergency vehicles. They were first conventional hand rung bells, and later replaced by electric driven "Gong" versions.
- Exhaust whistles - These are no longer used, but still referred to in some legislation, and may be found on classic emergency vehicles, an exhaust whistle is fitted to a vehicle's exhaust pipe, and functions similar to a steam whistle, with the exhaust gasses replacing the steam.

Some emergency vehicle operators occasionally turn off their sirens when on side streets or when there are no cars on the road so as not to disturb residents; however, there is seldom a mandate for responders to do so. The driver will then turn on the sirens before proceeding through intersections or when traveling on potentially dangerous stretches of road.

== Auxiliary lighting ==
Auxiliary lighting is light used for illumination, to supplement factory-installed headlights or to illuminate areas to the side of or behind the vehicle. It is typically white or near-white light. Some emergency scenes require additional lighting if the emergency workers are to be able to effectively deal with the emergency. Also, building numbers are often obscured by darkness, making it difficult for emergency workers to find the scene of an emergency. For these reasons, emergency vehicles are often equipped with auxiliary lighting, such as:

- spot-lights, which may be mounted on the side, top, or rear of a larger vehicle, or on the A-post/A-pillar of smaller vehicles. In some states where police vehicles are decommissioned, the department reserves the right to include the spotlight defined as emergency vehicle lighting; in the State of Texas since September 1, 2015 decommissioned police vehicles are sold without the A-pillar spotlight regardless of the lens color (white, or red/blue). Although the vehicle-mounted spot-light is available for purchase e.g. eBay, amazon.com, Craigslist, some states are regulating the sales of certain emergency vehicle equipment as part of a policy mandated by the Department of Homeland Security.
- flood lights, which may similarly be mounted on the side, top, or rear of a larger vehicle.
- load lights, which are used by ambulances and other vehicles with cargo doors to light up the area around the cargo doors.
- alley lights, which are typically found mounted on the side of a police car or emergency vehicle's lightbar, for the purpose of illuminating areas to the side of the car, such as into an alley, or a scene at the side of the road.
- take-downs, which are typically mounted on the front of an emergency vehicle's lightbar. Take-downs are used on police cars to illuminate the interior of a vehicle immediately in front of the police car, such as a vehicle that has been pulled over after committing a traffic violation or while conducting a high-risk vehicle stop (also called a felony stop). The bright lights also serve to blind the vision of suspects looking back toward the police. Take-downs are also used on ambulances and other vehicles to illuminate a work area in front of the vehicle, such as a patient in the roadway, an accident scene, or a fire scene.

== Communications devices ==
Efficient emergency responses require that emergency responders can communicate with a dispatcher, with each other, and often with other facilities (such as hospitals or public utilities). Emergency vehicles are equipped with the following types of equipment to do so:

- two-way radio, usually operating on dedicated frequencies and channels designated for emergency use, or in some cases simply a CB radio.
- portable two-way radios, which transmit and receive on the same frequencies as the built in two-way radios, but are less powerful. Emergency workers can take these radios with them when they exit the vehicle. There are also systems (frequently referred to as mobile extenders or mobile repeaters) that allow the portable radios to be relayed through the vehicle's more powerful two way radio. Some emergency services encrypt their radio transmissions.
- car phones or portable cellular phones.
- mobile data terminals, or MDTs, which are computers that communicate with the dispatcher's computer.
- Laptop computers with Wi-Fi connections, usually with an in-vehicle mounting point or docking station. These can be used as an alternative to MDTs.
- PA or bullhorn to communicate with other workers, or with members of the public. Most electronic sirens are equipped with a PA.
- dashcams, usually video and audio equipment used during DUI stops, inclusive of bodycams worn by on duty police officers

== Service/unit-specific equipment ==
Different services require different types of equipment at emergency scenes (ambulances and fire trucks carry different types of equipment), and within one service, different units may require different equipment.

=== Medical services ===
- Ambulance
- ambulance car
- Air ambulance

=== Fire ===
Fire service units and their role differ between countries.

- Fire apparatus
- Fire car
- rescue vehicle
- urban search and rescue (although this may be done by a different organization in some countries0

=== Police ===
- Armed response vehicles/SWAT vehicles
- Motorway/highway patrol vehicles
- Police car
- Police aircraft
- Police motorcycle
- Police van

== See also ==
- Teardrop light
- Blues and twos
