= Emergency service response codes =

Systems for categorizing emergency responses to reported events

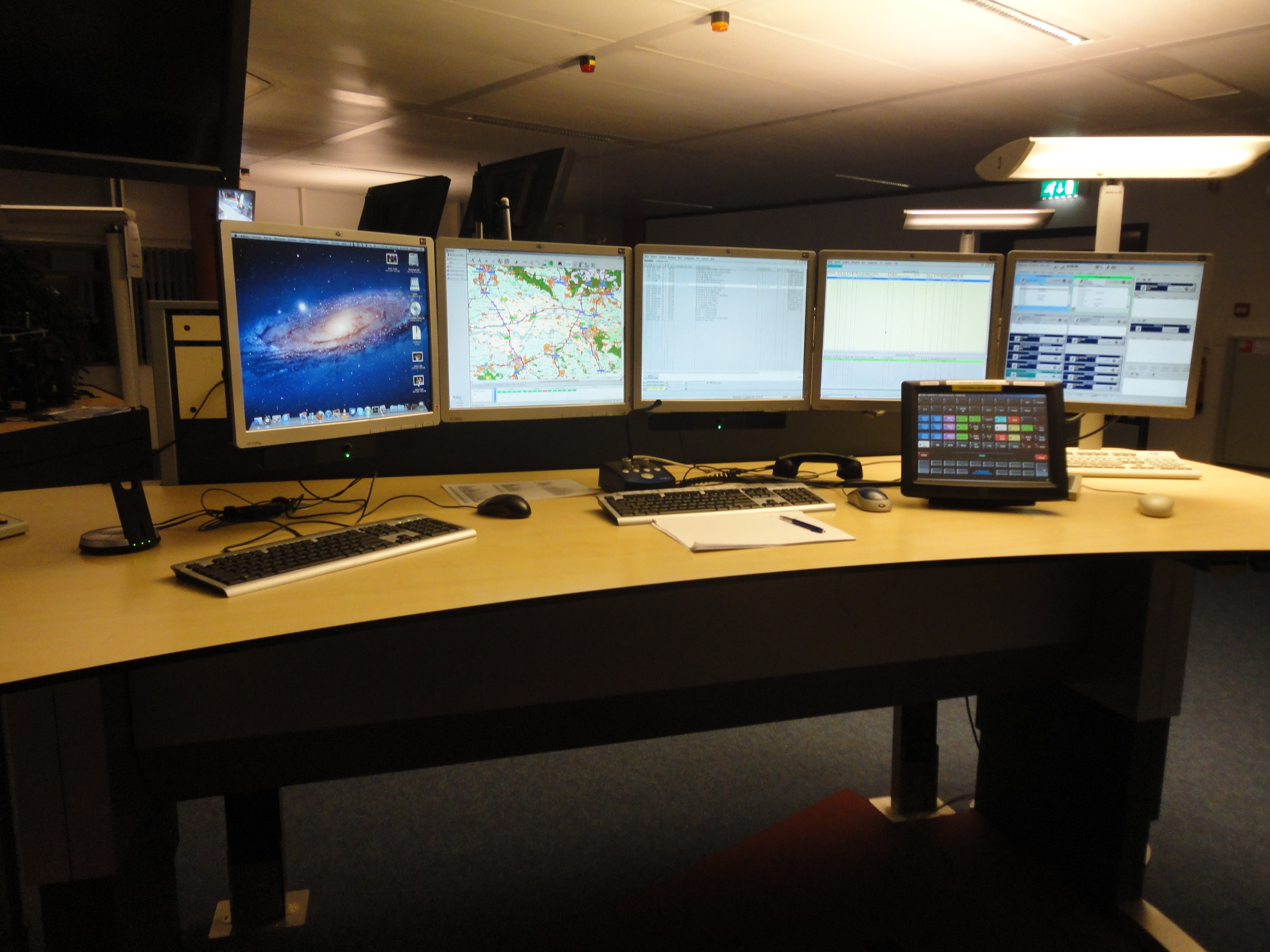
A police radio dispatcher's desk from the Netherlands

Emergency service response codes are predefined systems used by emergency services to describe the priority and response assigned to calls for service. Response codes vary from country to country, jurisdiction to jurisdiction, and even agency to agency, with different methods used to categorize responses to reported events.

== United States ==
In the United States, response codes are used to describe a mode of response for an emergency unit responding to a call. They generally vary but often have three basic tiers:

- Code 1: Respond to the call without lights and sirens.
- Code 2: Respond to the call with lights only (permissibility varies by jurisdiction).
- Code 3: Respond to the call using lights and sirens.

Some agencies may use the terms "upgrade" and "downgrade" to denote an increase or decrease in priority. For example, if a police unit is conducting a Code 1 response to an argument, and the dispatcher reports that the argument has escalated to a fight, the unit may "upgrade" to a Code 3 response, or be directed to do so. "Downgrade" may be used in the opposite situation; for example, if police are responding Code 2 to assist at a fire, but the fire department manages to get the scene under control, the responding police units may be asked to "downgrade" to Code 1. "Increase code" and "decrease code" are used interchangeably, usually by units themselves instead of dispatchers.

Multiple analyses link Code 3 operations with crashes involving responders. Accurate use of protocols establishing the priority of various cases is critical. The standard for emergency dispatcher training is becoming very high.

Some emergency medical services use "Priority" to establish the urgency of a given request for service instead of "Code", based on the status of the patient, the resources necessary, and the severity of the incident.

- Priority 1: Life-threatening emergency
- Priority 2: Non-life-threatening emergency
- Priority 3: Routine unscheduled call
- Priority 4: Routine scheduled call

=== National Shift to “plain language” ===
The National Incident Management System (NIMS) states "it is required that plain language be used for multi-agency, multi-jurisdiction and multi-discipline events, such as major disasters and exercises", and federal grants became contingent on this beginning fiscal year 2006. NIMS also strongly encourages the use of plain language for internal use within a single agency.

Plain language avoids confusion resulting from varying meanings assigned to different codes. Historically 10-codes and signal codes were used when radios were less reliable and frequent repetition was required. These codes were rarely uniform even between local agencies. Most used "10-4" to mean "acknowledged", for example, but some agencies used it as "message ends". A "Signal 30" could be a fatal car crash or any death, depending on local usage.

== United Kingdom ==
The use of lights and sirens is up to the individual police officer driving to the call. The nature of the call is an aggravating factor when deciding when to use them. Calls are graded by either the control room direct (in the case of emergency calls) or by some sort of first contact centre (nonemergency calls). Grading is affected by such factors as the use or threat of violence at the incident being reported. Even though the grading is done by the control room, officers can request an incident be upgraded if they feel in their judgement they are needed immediately. They can also request to downgrade an incident if they feel they cannot justify using emergency equipment like blue lights and sirens.

There is no nationally agreed call grading system with a number of different systems being used across the UK and attendance times given the grade varies between forces, depending on how rural the county is. For example, Suffolk Constabulary break down Grade A emergencies into further sub-categories of Grade A Urban and Rural, with Urban attendance times attracting a 15-minute arrival time and Grade A Rural attendance would attract a 20-minute arrival time. Some of these are listed below but the list is not exhaustive.

Police

Grade	Meaning	Audible and visible emergency equipment	Target time
A	Immediate response call	Use advisable	8 minutes
B	Significant call, routine call	Can be used if driver thinks police are needed immediately	20 minutes
C	extended call, Scheduled appointments	Not to be used	No time limit
D	Non-attendance	Not to be used	Non-attendance
Resolved	Non-attendance	Not to be used	Call is resolved at point of contact.

Another variant in use within the UK.

Grade	Meaning	Audible and visible emergency equipment
IM	Immediate Priority	Normally used, examples of incidents graded as an immediate priority include incidents in which life is at risk, there is serious injury (or risk of), serious road traffic collisions, and where serious crime is in-progress or has just taken place.
H	High Priority	Normally used - incidents graded high are of serious nature and have the potential to develop into immediate priority incidents
N	Normal Priority	Not used - incidents are graded as normal that do not depend upon a timely police response.
L	Low Priority	Not used - incidents graded as low that do not depend upon a timely police response and may be resolved by phone or pre-arranged appointment.
NA	Non-attendance	Not used, no police attendance required.

A numerical grading system is used in some forces.

Grade (Status)	Meaning	Audible and visible emergency equipment
State 0	Officer in danger	All available officers on radio frequencies respond.
State 1	Emergency response	Road traffic exemptions usually utilised as is audible and visual warning equipment.
State 2	Urgent response	Road traffic exemptions may be utilised along with audible and visual warning equipment.
State 3	Non-urgent response	Audible and visual warning equipment is not used.
State 4	Appointments	Audible and visual warning equipment is not used.
State 5	For information only	Calls not usually requiring police attendance that may be logged for information only.
State 6	On Scene	Officer On Scene of incident. Update information when necessary.

Ambulance

Ambulance responses in the UK are as follows. Some ambulance services allow driver discretion for Category 3/4 calls; this may be dependent on the type of call or how long it has been waiting for a response for. 999 calls to the ambulance service are triaged using either the NHS Pathways system or the Medical Priority Dispatch System.

Grade	Meaning	Audible and visible emergency equipment	Type of call	Initial response target	Response details
Category 1	Immediate Life Threat	Always used	Cardiac arrests, Choking, Unconscious, Continuous seizure, Not alert after a fall or trauma, Allergic reaction with breathing problems, Major Incidents	7 min	Response time measured with arrival of first emergency responder Will be attended by single responders and ambulance crews
Category 2	Emergency	Always used	Stroke patients, Fainting – not alert, Chest pain, Road Traffic Collisions, Major burns, Sepsis	18 min	Response time measured with arrival of transporting vehicle
Category 3	Urgent	Usually used (service policy dependent)	Falls, Fainting – now alert, Diabetic problems, Isolated limb fractures, Abdominal pain	120 min	Response time measured with arrival of transporting vehicle
Category 4	Less Urgent	Not usually used	Diarrhea, Vomiting, Non-traumatic back pain, Health Care Professional admission	180 min	Maybe managed through hear and treat Response time measured with arrival of transporting vehicle
GP Urgent	Urgent response	Not usually used	GP urgent admissions to hospital. Urgent interhospital transfers	1–4 hours or scheduled timeframe, decided by admitting HCP	

The use of flashing lights and sirens is colloquially known as blues and twos, which refers to the blue lights and the two-tone siren once commonplace (although most sirens now use a range of tones). In the UK, only blue lights are used to denote emergency vehicles (although other colours may be used as sidelights, stop indicators, etc.). A call requiring the use of lights and sirens is often colloquially known as a blue light run.

== Australia ==
Code 1: A time critical case with a lights and sirens ambulance response. An example is a cardiac arrest or serious traffic accident.

Code 2: An acute but non-time critical response. The ambulance does not use lights and sirens to respond. An example of this response code is a broken leg.

Code 3: A non-urgent routine case. These include cases such as a person with ongoing back pain but no recent injury.

Additional codes are used for internal purposes.

Country Fire Authority There are two types of response for the Country Fire Authority which cover the outer Melbourne Area. These are similar to those used by Ambulance Victoria, minus the use of Code 2.

Code 1: A time critical event with response requiring lights and siren. This usually is a known and going fire or a rescue incident.

Code 2: Unused within the Country Fire Authority

Code 3: Non-urgent event, such as a previously extinguished fire or community service cases (such as animal rescue or changing of smoke alarm batteries for the elderly).

=== New South Wales ===
Marine Rescue NSW

Code 1 Urgent Response - Use warning devices

Code 2 Semi Urgent Response - Use of Warning devices at skippers discretion

Code 3 Non Urgent Response - Warning Devices not needed

Code 4 Training - No Warning devices to be used unless specifically needed for training

The New South Wales Rural Fire Service and the New South Wales State Emergency Service use two levels of response, depending on what the call-out is and what has been directed of the crew attending the incident by orders of the duty officer:

- Proceed: To drive to an incident, without displaying lights and/or sirens and to obey all road rules.
- Respond: To drive to an incident, urgently but safely, whilst displaying lights and/or sirens. Drivers are exempt from the road traffic act with some conditions, however both organisations have policies imposing further restrictions. The siren can be switched off at the discretion of the driver when it is not needed (for example, when the road ahead is clear of traffic and easily visible) and reactivated at possible traffic hazards.

The New South Wales Police Force uses two distinct classifications for responding to incidents. In order to respond 'code red' a driver must be suitably trained and have qualified in appropriate police driver training courses.

- Code Red: Vehicle responding with lights and sirens activated.
- Code Blue: Vehicle responding without lights or sirens activated.

New South Wales Ambulance use 2 priorities similar to both SES and RFS.

- R1: Lights and Sirens Response
- R2: Normal Road Conditions

=== South Australia ===
SA Ambulance Service use a Priority system.

Priority	Case Type	Lights & Sirens Used	Crew Type	Response Time KPI
1	Emergency	Yes	Emergency (Paramedic or Intensive Care Paramedic)	8 minutes
2	Emergency	Yes	Emergency (Paramedic or Intensive Care Paramedic)	16 minutes
3	Urgent	No	Emergency (Paramedic or Intensive Care Paramedic)	30 minutes
4	Urgent	No	Emergency (Paramedic or Intensive Care Paramedic)	60 minutes
5	Urgent	No	Emergency Support Service (Ambulance Officer)	60 minutes
6	Routine	No	Emergency (Paramedic or Intensive Care Paramedic)	NA
7	Routine	No	Emergency Support Service (Ambulance Officer)	NA
8	Routine	No	Patient Transport Service (Ambulance Officer)	NA

Note: Priority 0 has been reserved for future use. Priority 9 is used for administration taskings and non-patient related vehicle movements.

The South Australian Metropolitan Fire Service, Country Fire Service and South Australian State Emergency Service use a Priority System which has been recently updated.

Priority	Type	Local Event Triage	Lights & Sirens Used	Response
1	Emergency	Can't wait	Yes	Multiple Units Sent, Life-Threat
2	Urgent	Can Wait	No	Single Unit Responded, Potential for Life-Threat
3	Routine	Will Wait	No	Used Primarily by SES, No risk of Life Threat

All calls are routed through the Metropolitan Fire Service (Call Sign "Adelaide Fire") including State Emergency Service 132 500 calls.

During significant weather events the State Communication Centre (SCC) unit of the SES take over call taking responsibly. This operations centre is staffed by volunteers routing calls for assistance to the closest unit who will dispatch the events to individual teams.

=== Queensland ===
Queensland Police uses the priority system:

- Code 1 - Immediate risk of death to a person. Proceed lights and sirens. Permission granted to disobey road rules.
- Code 2 - Immediate risk of serious injury to a person or damage to property. Proceed lights and sirens. Permission granted to disobey road rules.
- Code 3 - Routine job. Proceed without lights or siren. Road rules must be obeyed.
- Code 4 - Negotiated response time. Proceed without lights or siren. Road rules must be obeyed.

For Queensland Police code 1 and code 2 are exactly the same response time. Rarely will a job be given a priority code 1, instead officers will (in most cases) be told to respond code 2.

=== Northern Territory ===
St John Ambulance Northern Territory uses terms to determine the response:

- Emergency or Non-Emergency. Emergency can be broken down into Life-threatening or Non-life-threatening.
- Emergency: Life-threatening - Respond lights and sirens
- Emergency:Non-life-threatening - Respond without lights and sirens
- Non Emergency: Respond without lights and sirens

=== Western Australia ===
St John Ambulance Western Australia uses the following codes to determine a response:

- Priority 0 represents an Emergency call when there's an immediate threat to life, such as an incident requiring resuscitation.
- Priority 1 represents an Emergency call. (Response time target is to attend to 90% of emergency calls within 15 minutes)
- Priority 2 represents an Urgent call. No use of lights or sirens are authorised (Response time target is to attend to 90% of urgent calls within 25 minutes)
- Priority 3 represents a Non-urgent call. No use of lights or sirens are authorised (response time target is to attend to 90% of non-urgent calls within 60 minutes) ..

The Western Australia Police Force uses the following Priority codes from 1 to 6 to determine the urgency of Police response:

- Priority 1 or P1 is imminent threat to life or very serious incidents. Lights and siren authorised and an exemption from all road traffic laws. An example of a P1 call would be an active armed offender, pursuit or an officer requiring immediate assistance. This is the least common priority used, as most urgent calls fall under the Priority 2 category. The KPI for attendance of P1's is 12 minutes.
- Priority 2 or P2 is an urgent emergency call with risks of serious injury or damage to property. Lights and siren authorised and an exemption from all road traffic laws. An example of a P2 call is a high risk family violence incident, urgent welfare check, out of control gathering or a serious vehicle crash. The KPI for attendance of P2's is 12 minutes.
- Priority 3 or P3 is a routine call, no lights or sirens to be used unless authorised, Police to follow all traffic and road rules. An example of a P3 call is a disturbance, stealing/shoplift or sudden death. The KPI for attendance of P3's is 60 minutes.
- Priority 4 or P4 is a less urgent routine call, no lights or sirens to be used, Police to follow all traffic and road rules. An example of a P4 call is a reattendance of a job that was of a higher priority, arrest attempts or neighbourly dispute. The KPI for attendance of P4's is 24 hours.
- Priority 5 or P5 is a job that has been set for supervisor review. Various jobs may require a person of the rank of Acting Sergeant or higher to review the completed job.
- Priority 6 or P6 is a job set for attendance at a station or unit level. Jobs set at this priority are for the Officer in Charge of the station or unit to manage at their discretion. An example of a P6 call is community outreach, patrols or property to collect. The KPI for attendance of P6's is 30 days.

The Department of Fire and Emergency Services have two response codes:

- Fire Call is the response that authorises lights and sirens, and disobeying road laws within reason. This is the response for most calls, including bushfires and road crashes.
- Normal Road is the second response that requires the appliance to follow road regulations and not use emergency lights and siren. This code is rarely used for initial responders, but is given to further appliances if the incident doesn't require immediate assistance. This is also the only code that the State Emergency Services are authorised to respond with.

== Belgium ==
In Belgium, the federal government issues a common set of protocols for the integrated handling of both emergency as well as non-emergency medical calls. These protocols are bundled in the Belgian Manual of Medical Regulation, of which the latest version was issued in February 2026. They are used by federal calltakers who handle 112 emergency calls as well as non-emergency calls for some out-of-hours services of general practitioners. Through these protocols, each emergency or non-emergency medical call undergoes the same questioning. The calls are subsequently triaged by the calltaker and assigned an urgency level from 0 to 8. This urgency level defines the response time target as well as the necessary resources to assign. The urgency levels 0 to 5 are understood as requiring a response of emergency medical services, and the urgency levels 6 to 8 requiring a response of or consultation with a general practitioner.

Urgency	Definition	Response time^{1}	Preferred response^{2}	Alternative response^{2}
0	Resuscitation: cardiac arrest.		Fastest ALS / BLS / first responder	
1	Immediate threat to life or organs: highest priority.	15 minutes	ALS physician	
2	Eventual threat to life or organs: condition requiring emergency medical assistance.	15 minutes	ALS physician	ALS ambulance
3	May rapidly progress to threat to life or organs: condition requiring emergency medical assistance within a known protocol.	15 minutes	ALS ambulance	ALS physician
4	May progress to threat to life or organs: condition not requiring emergency medical assistance.	20 minutes	ALS ambulance	BLS ambulance
5	No threat to life or organs: condition requiring hospital admission for diagnosis or therapy.	25 minutes	BLS ambulance	ALS ambulance
6	No threat to life or organs: condition requiring rapid medical evaluation within 1 to 2 hours for diagnosis or therapy.	2 hours	General practitioner	BLS ambulance
7	No threat to life or organs: condition requiring medical evaluation within 12 hours for diagnosis or therapy.	12 hours	General practitioner	
8	Plannable care: referall to own general practitioner outside of the out-of-hours service.	None	General practitioner	

(1): The response time target is defined as the time between the start of the call and the arrival on-scene of the first or only medical resource. The federal protocols state that the response time target should be met for 90% of all interventions.

(2): Each urgency level is associated with a type of resource to be preferably assigned or dispatched to the call. In Belgium, advanced life support (ALS) is provided by response cars staffed by physicians and nurses and by ambulances staffed by nurses and EMTs. The response cars with a physician have a (theoretically) unlimited scope of practice, and are dispatched to the most severe calls alongside an ambulance. The ALS ambulances are staffed by a nurse who delivers care through the use of standing orders written by a physician. The scope of practice of these nurses is more limited than that of a physician. If the preferred resource is not available within a certain time but a defined alternative resource is, then that alternative resource will be dispatched to the call instead.

== British Columbia, Canada ==
BC EHS Clinical Response Model implemented as of May 30, 2018 by BC Emergency Health Services, updating how they assign paramedics, ambulance and other resources to 9-1-1 calls.

Colour	Patient Condition	Details	Additional Resources
Purple	Immediately life-threatening	E.g. Cardiac Arrest	Fire Immediately dispatched
Red	Immediately life-threatening or time critical	E.g. Chest Pain	Fire Immediately dispatched
Orange	Urgent	Potentially serious, but not immediately life-threatening (E.g. Abdominal Pain)	Fire may be dispatched
Yellow	Non-urgent	Not serious or life-threatening. (E.g. Sprained Ankle)	
Green	Non-urgent	Not serious or life-threatening. Possibly suitable for treatment at scene. NOT Being implemented immediately	
Blue	Non-urgent	Not serious or life-threatening. Further clinical telephone triage and advice Referrals to HealthLink BC (8-1-1 calls)	Patient will be called back.

== Sweden ==
In Sweden, emergency services use specific response codes as in many other countries to categorize the urgency of incidents and determine the appropriate response. These codes vary among the police, ambulance services, and fire services.

=== Police ===
The Swedish Police Authority categorizes emergency responses into three urgency levels, known as angelägenhetsgrader (urgency levels). Each level determines the extent to which officers may disregard traffic regulations while responding to incidents. However, all exemptions require caution and must only be exercised if necessary.

- Tjänsteutövning (Routine duty) – Applies to all police patrol operations. Officers may disregard certain traffic rules, including:
  - Driving on pedestrian streets, bicycle paths, and bus lanes (max 30 km/h on pedestrian areas).
  - Entering restricted areas, such as one-way streets, environmental zones, and roads with vehicle bans.
  - Parking in otherwise prohibited locations, such as bus stops and pedestrian zones.
  - Making otherwise prohibited turns or reversing on motorways when necessary.
- Brådskande (Urgent response) – Used when time is a critical factor. If a situation can wait, it is not considered urgent. In addition to the exemptions under routine duty, officers may:
  - Exceed posted speed limits.
  - Take priority boarding on ferries.
  - Drive above absolute speed limits, including in pedestrian zones.
- Trängande fall (Emergency response) – Reserved for cases where there is an immediate and severe danger to life, health, or significant property damage. Officers may disregard almost all traffic regulations, including:
  - Overtaking despite prohibitions.
  - Ignoring stop signs, red lights, and mandatory driving directions.
  - Disregarding right-of-way rules, including yielding to oncoming traffic and in roundabouts.

However, even in an emergency (trängande fall), police must obey the instructions of traffic officers or traffic guard. The use of blue lights and sirens to request the right of way is only permitted during trängande fall

=== Ambulance Services ===
The Swedish ambulance services classify emergencies into four priority levels:

- Prio 1 – Life-threatening conditions requiring immediate intervention. Ambulances respond with lights and sirens.
- Prio 2 – Acute but not life-threatening situations. Prompt response without lights and sirens.
- Prio 3 – Non-urgent cases needing medical transport without immediate risk.
- Prio 4 – Scheduled patient transports, such as transfers between medical facilities.

=== Fire Services ===
The Swedish fire services operate with two primary response priorities similarly to the ambulance service,:

- Prio 1 – Immediate response with lights and sirens for critical incidents like fires, severe traffic accidents, or hazardous material spills.
- Prio 2 – Non-emergency responses without lights and sirens for situations that require attention but do not pose immediate danger.

== See also ==
- Medical Priority Dispatch System
- Police code
- Ten-code
