= Ten-code =

Brevity codes used by a variety of US professionals

Ten-codes, officially known as ten signals, are brevity codes used to represent common phrases in voice communication, particularly by US public safety officials and in citizens band (CB) radio transmissions. The police version of ten-codes is officially known as the APCO Project 14 Aural Brevity Code.

The codes, developed during 1937–1940 and expanded in 1974 by the Association of Public-Safety Communications Officials-International (APCO), allow brevity and standardization of message traffic. They have historically been widely used by law enforcement officers in North America, but in 2006, due to the lack of standardization, the U.S. federal government recommended they be discontinued in favor of everyday language.

== History ==
APCO first proposed Morse code brevity codes in the June 1935 issue of The APCO Bulletin, which were adapted from the procedure symbols of the U.S. Navy, though these procedures were for communications in Morse code, not voice.

In August 1935, the APCO Bulletin published a recommendation that the organization issue a handbook that described standard operating procedures, including:

1. A standard message form for use by all police departments.
2. A simple code for service dispatches relating to corrections, repetitions, etc.
3. A standard arrangement of the context of messages (for example, name and description of missing person might be transmitted as follows: Name, age, height, weight, physical characteristics, clothing; if car used, the license, make, description and motor number. This information would actually be transmitted in the text of the message as follows: John Brown 28-5-9-165 medium build brown eyes dark hair dark suit light hat Mich. 35 lic. W 2605 Ford S 35 blue red wheels 2345678 may go to Indiana).
4. A standard record system for logging the operation of the station.
5. Other important records in accordance with the uniform crime reporting system sponsored by the International Association of Chiefs of Police.

The development of the APCO Ten Signals began in 1937 to reduce use of speech on the radio at a time when police radio channels were limited. Credit for inventing the codes goes to Charles "Charlie" Hopper, communications director for the Illinois State Police, District 10 in Pesotum, Illinois. Hopper had been involved in radio for years and realized there was a need to abbreviate transmissions on State Police bands. Experienced radio operators knew the first syllable of a transmission was frequently not understood because of quirks in early electronics technology. Radios in the 1930s were based on vacuum tubes powered by a small motor-generator called a dynamotor. The dynamotor took from 1/10 to 1/4 of a second to "spin up" to full power. Police officers were trained to push the microphone button, then pause briefly before speaking; however, sometimes they would forget to wait. Preceding each code with "ten-" gave the radio transmitter time to reach full power. An APCO Bulletin of January 1940 lists codes assigned as part of standardisation.

In 1954, APCO published an article describing a proposed simplification of the code, based on an analysis conducted by the San Diego Police Department. In the September 1955 issue of the APCO Bulletin, a revision of the Ten-Signals was proposed, and it was later adopted.

The Ten Signals were included in APCO Project Two (1967), "Public Safety Standard Operating Procedures Manual", published as study cards in APCO Project 4 (1973), "Ten Signal Cards", and then revised in APCO Project 14 (1974).

=== In popular culture ===
Ten-codes, especially "10-4" (meaning "understood") first reached public recognition in the mid- to late-1950s through the television series Highway Patrol, with Broderick Crawford.

Ten-codes were adapted for use by CB radio enthusiasts. C. W. McCall's hit song "Convoy" (1975), depicting conversation among CB-communicating truckers, put phrases like "10-4" and "what's your twenty?" (10-20 for "where are you?") into common use in American English.

The film Convoy (1978), loosely based on McCall's song, further entrenched ten-codes in casual conversation, as did the film Smokey and the Bandit.

The New Zealand reality television show Ten 7 Aotearoa (formerly Police Ten 7) takes its name from the New Zealand Police ten-code 10-7, which means "Unit has arrived at job".

== Police officer retirement (North America) ==
Often when an officer retires, a call to dispatch is made. The officer gives a 10-7 code (Out of service) and then a 10-42 code (ending tour of duty).

== Signals by time period (North America) ==
Signal	APCO meaning								
Signal	1937 APCO	1939 first published set (17 signals)	1940 (APCO Standards Committee)	1955 (National Operating Procedure Committee)	APCO Project 2 (1967)	APCO Project 4 (1973)	APCO Project 14 (1974)	Clear Speech (c. 1971) (plain language to replace Ten Codes)	Phrase Word Brevity Code (c. 1979)
Procedure and officer details
10-MAX		AWOL	-	-	-		Corrupt Officer	Officer not following orders	Insubordination/Rogue Officer
									Go Ahead
									Under Control
									In Pursuit
									Traffic Stop
10-0			—	—	—		—	Use caution	
10-1			Receiving poorly.		Unable to copy – change location		Signal Weak	Unable to copy – change location	Unreadable
10-2			Receiving well		Signals good		Signal Good	—	
10-3			Stop transmitting	Disregard last information	Stop transmitting		Stop Transmitting		
10-4			Acknowledgement	Message received	Acknowledgement		Affirmative (Ok)	Roger	Roger/Affirmative
10-5			Relay				Relay (To)	Relay	
10-6			Busy	Busy, stand by	Busy – Stand by unless urgent		Busy	Busy	
10-7			Out of service		Out of service (Give location and/or telephone number)		Out of Service	Out at ...	Out of Service
10-7 A							—		Not Available
10-7 B							—		Off Radio
10-8			In service				In Service	Clear	In Service
10-9			Repeat, conditions bad	Repeat			Say Again		
10-10			Out of service—subject to call	On minor detail, subject to call	Fight in progress		Negative	—	
10-11			Dispatching too rapidly	Stay in service	Dog Case		... On Duty	—	On Radio
10-12			Officials or visitors present	Visitors or officials present	Stand by (stop)		Stand By (Stop)	Stand by	Stand By
10-13			Advise weather and road conditions	Weather and road conditions	Weather and road report		Existing Conditions	Weather report/road report	
10-14			Convoy or escort	Convoy or escort	Report of prowler		Message/Information	—	Prepare to Copy
10-15			We have prisoner in custody		Civil disturbance		Message Delivered	Disturbance	
10-16			Pick up prisoner at ...		Domestic trouble		Reply to Message	—	
10-17			Pick up papers at ...		Meet complainant		Enroute	—	Responding
10-17 A			—	—	—		—	Theft	
10-17 B			—	—	—		—	Vandalism	
10-17 C			—	—	—		—	Shoplifting	
10-18			Complete present assignment as quickly as possible	Anything for us?	Complete assignment quickly		Urgent		Priority
10-19			Return to your station	Nothing for you	Return to ...		(In) Contact	Return to ...	
10-20			What is your location?	Location	Location		Location	Location	
10-21			Call this station by telephone	Call ... by phone			Call (...) by Phone	Call ...	Telephone
10-22			Take no further action last information	Report in person to ...	Disregard		Disregard		
10-23			Stand by until no interference	Arrived at scene			Arrived at Scene	On scene	
10-24			Trouble at station—unwelcome visitors—all units vicinity report at once	Finished with last assignment	Assignment completed		Assignment Completed	—	Available
10-25			Do you have contact with...?	Operator or officer on duty?	Report in person to (meet) ...		Report to (Meet) ...	Meet ... or contact ...	
10-26			Can you obtain automobile registration information?	Holding subject, rush reply	Detaining subject, expedite		Estimated Arrival Time	Detaining subject, expedite	
10-27			Any answer our number...?	Request driver's license information	Drivers license information		License/Permit Information	Drivers license information on ...	
10-28			Check full registration information	Request full registration information	Vehicle registration information		Ownership Information	Registration information on ...	
10-29			Check for wanted	Check record for wanted	Check records for wanted.		Records Check	Check for wanted on ...	
Emergency or unusual
10-30			Does not conform to rules and regulations		Illegal use of radio		Danger/Caution	—	Use Caution
10-31			Is lie detector available?	Emergency basis, all squads, 10-11	Crime in progress		Pick Up	—	
10-31 A			—	—	—		—	Burglary	
10-31 B			—	—	—		—	Robbery	
10-31 C			—	—	—		—	Homicide	
10-31 D			—	—	—		—	Kidnapping	
10-31 E			—	—	—		—	Shooting	
10-32			Is drunkometer available?	Chase, all squads stand by	Man with gun		... Units Needed (Specify)	—	
10-33			Emergency traffic at this station—clear?	Emergency traffic this station	EMERGENCY		Help Me Quick	—	Help Officer
10-34			Clear for local dispatch?	Trouble at station, assistance needed	Riot		Time	—	
10-35			Confidential information	Major crime, blockade	Major crime alert		—Reserved—	—	
10-36			Correct time?	—	Correct time		—Reserved—	—	
10-37			Operator on duty?	No rush	Investigate suspicious vehicle		—Reserved—	—	
10-38			Station report—satisfactory	Hurry, but do not use red light or siren	Stopping suspicious vehicle (Give station complete description before stopping)		—Reserved—	Traffic stop on ...	
10-39			Your Nr...delivered to addressee	Use red light and siren	Urgent-Use light and siren		—Reserved—	—	
General use							Private use		
10-40			Advise if Officer...available for radio call	Notification	Silent run – No light or siren			—	
10-41			Tune to ... kcs. for test with mobile unit or emergency service	Car change at ...	Beginning tour of duty			—	
10-42			—	Crew change at ...	Ending tour of duty			Off duty	
10-43			—	Take school crossing	Information			—	
10-44			—	—	Request permission to leave patrol ... for ...			Request for ...	
10-45			—	—	Animal carcass in ... lane at ...			—	
10-46			—	—	Assist motorist			Assist motorist	
10-47			—	—	Emergency road repairs needed			—	
10-48			—	—	Traffic standard needs repairs			—	
10-49			—	Hourly report mark	Traffic light out			East bound green light out (etc.)	
Accident and vehicle handling
10-50			—	Auto accident, property damage only	Accident—F, PI, PD			Traffic (F, PD) Traffic: Hit and run; Injury; No injury reported; Unknown; Private property, location	
10-51			—	Auto accident, wrecker sent	Wrecker needed			—	
10-52			—	Auto accident, personal injuries, ambulance sent	Ambulance needed			—	
10-53			—	Auto accident, fatal	Road blocked			—	
10-54			—	—	Livestock on highway			—	
10-55			—	Drunken driver	Intoxicated driver			—	
10-56			—	—	Intoxicated pedestrian			Drunk pedestrian	
10-57			—	—	Hit and run—F, PI, PD			—	
10-58			—	Is wrecker on the way?	Direct traffic			—	
10-59			—	Is ambulance on the way?	Convoy or escort			—	
Net message handling
10-60			What is next item (message) number?	What is your next message number?	Squad in vicinity			—	
10-61			Stand by for CW traffic on ... kcs	CW traffic	Personnel in area			—	
10-62			Unable to copy phone—use CW	Any answer our Nr. ...	Reply to message			—	
10-63			Net directed	Time	Prepare to make written copy			Prepare to copy	
10-64			Net free	—	Message for local delivery			—	
10-65			Clear for item (message) assignment?	Clear for message assignment	Net message assignment			—	
10-66			Clear for cancellation?	Clear for cancellation	Message cancellation			—	
10-67			Stations...carry this item (message)	Clear for net message	Clear to read net message			—	
10-68			Repeat dispatch	—	Dispatch information			—	
10-69			Have you dispatched...?	—	Message received			—	
Fire
10-70			Net message (State net traffic)	Fire, phone alarm	Fire alarm			Fire	
10-71			Proceed with traffic in sequence (busy here)	Box alarm	Advise nature of fire (size, type, and contents of building)			—	
10-72			—	Second alarm	Report progress on fire			—	
10-73			—	Third alarm	Smoke report			—	
10-74			—	Fourth alarm	Negative			Negative	
10-75			—	Fifth alarm	In contact with			—	
10-76			—	Fire equipment needed	En Route			En route ...	
10-77			—	Fire, grass	ETA (estimated time of arrival)			ETA (estimated time of arrival)	
10-78			—	Set up command post	Need assistance			Request Assistance	
10-79			—	Report progress on fire	Notify coroner			Notify coroner (to be done by phone whenever possible)	
Reserved for assignment by nets for local use				Personal favors	—				
10-80			... tower lights at this station burned out	—	—			Chase	
10-81			Officer Nr. ... will be at your station ...	—	—			—	
10-82			Reserve room with bath at hotel for officer Nr. ...	Reserve hotel room	Reserve lodging			—	
10-83			Have officer Nr. ... call this station by telephone	—	—			—	
10-84			Advise telephone Nr. ... your city that officer Nr. ... will not return this date	—	If meeting ... advise ETA			—	
10-85			Officer ... left this station for ... (Jefferson City) (Des Moines) at ...	—	Will be late			—	
10-86			Officer ... left this station for ... at ...	—	—			—	
10-87			Officer Nr. ... will be in ... if officer Nr. ... will be in	—	Meet the officer at ______			—	
10-88			What phone number shall we call to make station to station call to officer Nr. ...?	Advise phone number for station to station call	Advise present telephone number of ...			—	
10-89			Request radio service man be sent to this station...	Radio transmission	—			Bomb threat	
Technical
10-90			Radio service man will be at your station ....	Transmit on alternate frequency	Bank alarm			Alarm (type of alarm)	
10-91			Prepare for inspection (date) ... (time) ...	—	Unnecessary use of radio			Pick up prisoner	
10-92			Your quality poor—transmitter apparently out of adjustment	—	—			Parking complaint	
10-93			Frequencies to be checked this date	Frequency check	Blockade			—	
10-94			Test—no modulation—for frequency check	Give me a test	Drag racing			—	
10-95			Test intermittently with normal modulation for ...	—	—			Prisoner in custody	
10-96			Test continuously with tone modulation for ...	—	Mental subject			—	
10-97			—	—	—			Check traffic signal	
10-98			—	—	Prison or jail break			Prison/jail break	
10-99			—	—	Records indicate wanted or stolen			Wanted/stolen	

== Usage by area ==
=== New Zealand ===
The New Zealand Police use a variety of radio communication codes including its own version of 10-codes seen below.

Code	Meaning	Activity
10-0	Off duty	In use
10-1	Broadcast to all units	In use
10-2	Enroute to job/event	In use
10-3	Available	In use
10-4	Repeat your last message	In use
10-5	Out of service for a short time	Not in use
10-6	Change radio channel	In use
10-7	Arrived at job/event	In use
10-8	Busy but available	In use
10-9	Urgent message	In use
10-10	Officer requires immediate assistance (call for help)	In use

== TxtFire Philippines fire-specific 10-codes ==
TxtFire Philippines employs a subset of its standard 10-codes exclusively for fire-response operations. These fire-specific signals are used to dispatch and coordinate firefighting resources on VHF/UHF radio.

== Fire-specific code list ==
Code	Meaning
10-23	Arrived at scene
10-45	Fire-service vehicle
10-70	For Verification, Fire alarm (structure)
10-71	Advise nature of fire
10-73	Request additional fire truck
10-74	Negative Fire

== Fire response protocols ==
- Codes 10-70 through 10-73 automatically trigger dispatch of firefighting units and apparatus.
- Code 10-45 is used to identify any fire-service vehicle (engine, ladder, tanker, etc.) on the air.
- All fire-specific traffic takes priority over routine and non-fire messages on the main frequency.

== Operational procedures ==
=== Emergency protocols ===
Codes 10-70 through 10-73 are designated as fire-specific codes that trigger automatic dispatch protocols within the TxtFire network.

Code 10-33 is reserved exclusively for life-threatening emergencies, requiring all non-essential radio traffic to cease immediately.

=== Communication guidelines ===
Before initiating non-emergency communication with another station, operators must first request permission using code "10-75" from base control and complete the communication within three minutes, or transfer to a secondary channel.

During curfew hours (22:00–06:00), only emergency traffic is permitted on the main frequency; routine communications are prohibited.

Base control strictly prohibits vulgar language and commercial or personal advertisements on all frequencies.

== Replacement with plain language ==
While ten-codes were intended to be a terse, concise, and standardized system, the proliferation of different meanings can render them useless in situations when officers from different agencies and jurisdictions need to communicate.

In the fall of 2005, responding to inter-organizational communication problems during the rescue operations after Hurricane Katrina, the United States Federal Emergency Management Agency (FEMA) discouraged the use of ten-codes and other codes due to their wide variation in meaning. The Department of Homeland Security's SAFECOM program, established in response to communication problems experienced during the September 11 attacks also advises local agencies on how and why to transition to plain language, and their use is expressly forbidden in the nationally standardized Incident Command System, as is the use of other codes.

APCO International stated in 2012 that plain speech communications over public safety radio systems is preferred over the traditional 10-Codes and dispatch signals. Nineteen states had changed to plain English by the end of 2009. As of 2011, ten-codes remained in common use in many areas, but were increasingly being phased out in favor of plain language.

=== Phrase Word Brevity Code ===
About 1979, APCO created the Phrase Word Brevity Code as a direct replacement for the Ten-code.

Phrase Word Brevity Code
Phrase word	English meaning	APCO Ten-code
Use Caution	Caution: dangerous condition is suspected to exist	10-0
Unreadable	Radio signal is too weak to receive	10-1
Out of Service	Unit, vehicle or person is not working	10-7
In Service	Unit, vehicle or person is working but not necessarily "available" or "on radio"	10-8
Available	Unit is in service ready to accept assignment, not necessarily by radio	10-24
Not Available	Unit cannot accept another assignment, but may be "on radio"	10-7A
Prepare to Copy	Dispatcher is about to give lengthy message	10-14
Go	You have been given clearance to transmit your message	-
Roger (Received)	Message received and understood	10-4
Say Again (Repeat)	Repeat your message	10-9
Stand By	Stop transmitting and wait for further instructions	10-12
Disregard (Recall)	Cancel your present assignment	10-22
Off Radio	Unit is not capable of being contacted by radio, but may be "available"	10-7B
On Radio	Unit is capable of being contacted by radio, but not necessarily "available"	10-11
Responding	Unit is en route to assigned location	10-17
Under Control	Situation is under control when no further assistance is anticipated	-
Telephone (Tel. # or person)	Call by telephone specified number or person	10-21
Priority	When transmitted, means that the following transmission must have immediate attention	-
In Pursuit	Unit is chasing a vehicle and requires assistance from other units	-
Traffic Stop	Unit is going to stop a motorist	O-10
Help Officer	Help me quick (emergency)	10-33
Affirmative	Yes	10-4

=== ICS Clear Text ===
In 1980, the National Incident Management System published a document, ICS Clear Text Guide, which was another attempt to create a replacement for Ten-codes. The list of code words was republished in the 1990 Montana Mutual Aid and Common Frequencies document.

ICS Clear Text Guide
Procedure word	Meaning
Unreadable	Used when signal received is not clear. In most cases, try to add the specific trouble. Example: "Unreadable, background noise."
Loud and Clear	Self-explanatory
Stop Transmitting	Self-explanatory
Copy, Copies	Used to acknowledge message received. Unit radio identifier must also be used. Example: "Engine 2675, copies."
Affirmative	Yes
Negative	No
Respond, Responding	Used during dispatch – proceed to or proceeding to an incident. Example: "Engine 5176, respond ..." or "St. Helena, Engine 1375 responding."
Enroute	Normally used by administrative or staff personnel to designate destinations. "Enroute" is not a substitute for responding. Example: "Redding, Chief 2400 enroute RO II."
In-quarters, with Station Name or Number	Used to indicate that a unit is in a station. Example: "Morgan Hill, Engine 4577 in-quarters, Sunol."
Uncovered	Indicates a unit is not in service, because there are no personnel to operate it.
Out-Of-Service	Indicates a unit is mechanically out of service. Example: "Aburn, transport 2341, out-of-service." Note, when repairs have been completed the following phrase should be used: "Aburn transport 2341, back in-service, available."
In-Service	This means that the unit is operating, not in response to a dispatch. Example: "Fortuna, Engine 1283, in-service, fire prevention inspections."
Repeat	Self-explanatory
Weather	Self-explanatory
Return to	Normally used by communications center to direct units that are available to a station or other location.
What is your Location?	Self-explanatory
Call ____ by Phone	Self-explanatory
Disregard Last Message	Self-explanatory
Stand-By	Self-explanatory
Vehicle Registration Check	Self-explanatory
Is ____ Available for a Phone Call?	Self-explanatory
At Scene	Used when Units arrive at the scene of an incident. Example: "Perris, Engine 6183, at scene."
Available at Residence	Used by administrative or staff personnel to indicate they are available and on-call at their residence.
Can Handle	Used with the amount of equipment needed to handle the incident. Example: "Susanville Battalion 2212, can handle with units not at scene."
Burning Operations	Self-explanatory
Report on Conditions	Self-explanatory
Fire under Control	Self-explanatory
Emergency Traffic Only	Radio users will confine all radio transmissions to an emergency in progress or a new incident. Radio traffic which includes status information such as responding, reports on conditions, at scene and available will not be authorized during this period.
Emergency Traffic	Term used to gain control of radio frequency to report an emergency. All other radio users will refrain from using that frequency until cleared for use by the communications center.
Resume Normal Traffic	Self-explanatory

== Related codes ==
Brevity codes other than the APCO 10-code are frequently used, and include several types:

- The California Highway Patrol uses ten-codes, along with an additional set of eleven- and higher codes.
- California Penal Code sections were in use by the Los Angeles Police Department as early as the 1940s, and these Hundred Code numbers are still used today instead of the corresponding ten-code. Generally these are given as two sets of numbers
- The New York Fire Department uses its own ten-code system.
- Fire and Emergency New Zealand uses a system of "K-codes" to pass fire appliance availability statuses as well as operational messages. For example, "K1" means "proceeding to incident", "K99" means "Structure fire, well involved", and "K41" means "fatality" (a reference to the Ballantyne's fire, New Zealand's deadliest, which killed 41 people). The New Zealand Police also use some K-codes, with completely unrelated meanings to those used by FENZ; Police code "K1" means "no further police action required".
- Telegraph and teletype procedures
  - Q code and prosigns for Morse code are used in amateur radio, aviation, and marine radio. They provide specific abbreviations for concepts related to aviation, shipping, RTTY, radiotelegraph, and amateur radio. In radiotelegraph operation, a Q code is often shorter, and provides codes standardized by meaning in all languages – essential for international shortwave radio communications.
  - Z codes are used for military radio communications NATO countries, and like Q codes are standardized across languages.

== See also ==
- Advanced Medical Priority Dispatch System
- Emergency service response codes
- List of CB slang
- List of international common standards
- Medical Priority Dispatch System
- NATO phonetic alphabet
- Radiotelephony procedure
  - Procedure word
- Spelling alphabet
