= Police radio code =

Brevity codes used by law enforcement

A police radio code is a brevity code, usually numerical or alphanumerical, used to transmit information between law enforcement over police radio systems in the United States. Examples of police codes include "10 codes" (such as 10-4 for "okay" or "acknowledged"—sometimes written X4 or X-4), signals, incident codes, response codes, or other status codes. These code types may be used in the same sentence to describe specific aspects of a situation.

Codes vary by country, administrative subdivision, and agency. It is rare to find two agencies with the same ten codes, signals, incident codes, or other status codes. While agencies with adjacent or overlapping jurisdictions often have similar codes, it is not uncommon to find differences even within one county or city. Different agencies can have codes dissimilar enough to make communication difficult. There are similarities among popular sets of 10-codes.

The topic of standardized codes has been discussed in US law enforcement circles, but there is no consensus on the issue. Some law enforcement agencies use “plain talk” or “plain codes” which replace codes with standard speech and terminology, albeit in a structured manner or format. Arguments against plain language include its lack of brevity, variability, and lack of secrecy which is often tactically advantageous or a safety issue when officer communications can be overheard by the civilian public.

== Examples ==
Code	Description
2	No lights or sirens
3	Lights and sirens
4	Disregard
121	Priority on the air
122	Priority on silence
123	Sick or injured person
124	Operation completed
125	Operation continue
126	Intercept suspects
127	Proceed with caution
128	No siren, no flashing
129	Request back up
130	Emergency
131	Shooting
132	Armed robbery
133	Possibly dangerous person
134	Kidnapping
135	Escape
136	Hold of hostages
137	Riot
138	Bomb alert
139	Air disaster
140	Murder
141	Accident
142	Unlawful assembly
143	Hit and run
144	Impaired
145	Prisoner transport
146	Breaking and entering (vehicle or residence)
147	Suspect armed
148	Brawl or family feuding
149	Ascertainment
150	Theft

=== California ===
The Hundred Code is a three-digit police code system. This code is usually pronounced digit-by-digit, using a radio alphabet for any letters, such as 207A "two zero seven Adam". The following codes are used in California. They are from the California Penal Code, except where noted below.

In the 1970s, the television show Adam-12 was considered so authentic in its portrayal of Los Angeles PD officers and their procedures that excerpts from the shows were used as police training films nationwide. This led to the widespread use of California Penal Codes as radio codes.

Code	Description
187	Murder
207	Kidnapping
207A	Kidnapping attempt
211	Robbery
211A	Robbery alarm
211S	Robbery alarm, silent
212	Illegal use of drugs
213	Use of illegal explosives
214	Kidnapping and murder
215	Carjacking
216	Child abuse
217	Assault with intent to murder
218	Sexual activity with a minor
219	Cutting or stabbing
240	Assault
241	Impaling
242	Battery
243	Battery with dangerous weapons
244	Throwing acid with intent to disfigure or burn
245	Assault with a deadly weapon
246	Shooting at inhabited dwelling
261	Rape
261A	Attempted rape
273A	Child neglect
273D	Domestic violence – felony
288	Lewd conduct with a minor
311	Possession of obscene material
314	Indecent exposure
374B	Illegal dumping
390	Drunk
390D	Drunk, unconscious
415	Disturbance
417	Person with a gun
417K	Person with a knife
417B	Person with bomb
419	Dead human body
428	Child molest
444	Officer-involved shooting
459	Burglary
459A	Burglar alarm
459S	Burglar alarm, silent
470	Forgery
480	Hit and run – felony (great bodily injury or death)
481	Hit and run – misdemeanor
486	Major theft (value > $10,000)
487	Grand theft (value > $950, or certain livestock)
488	Petty theft (value < $950)
501	Drunk driving – felony (great bodily injury or death)
502	Drunk driving
503	Auto theft
504	Tampering with a vehicle
505A	Reckless driving
507	Public nuisance
510	Speeding or racing vehicles
586	Illegal parking
594	Malicious mischief
604	Throwing object
647	Lewd conduct (various subsections)
653M	Threatening phone calls
998	Officer involved shooting

=== 500 codes and similar ===
"500" codes are only radio codes that substitute for other code sections. For example, a "503" is not Penal Code section 503 (embezzlement). All of the "500" codes, generally, involve vehicles and are thus grouped together (except 594, which is an actual Penal Code section). Additionally, "390" and variants are also radio codes only (CPC 647(f) is the legally enforced section "public intoxication").

In California, some radio codes in the 400–599 range that refer to vehicle violations are left over from the California Vehicle Code (CVC) which was revised in 1971. Some agencies, such as the California Highway Patrol (CHP) use the vehicle code numbers while municipal and county police agencies, especially the Los Angeles Police Department (LAPD) still use the 500 series.

Old	New	Description
480	20001	Felony hit and run
481	20002	Misdemeanor hit and run
501	23151	Felony drunk driving
502	23152	Misdemeanor drunk driving
503	10851	Stolen vehicle (also a penal code section, 487A)
504	10854	Tampering with a motor vehicle
505	23103	Reckless driving
510	23109	Speed contest / racing
586	22500	Illegal parking

== See also ==
- Emergency service response codes
- APCO phonetic alphabet
- NATO phonetic alphabet
- Ten-code
- 5150
