= Call for service =

Term for an incident reported to and handled by emergency services

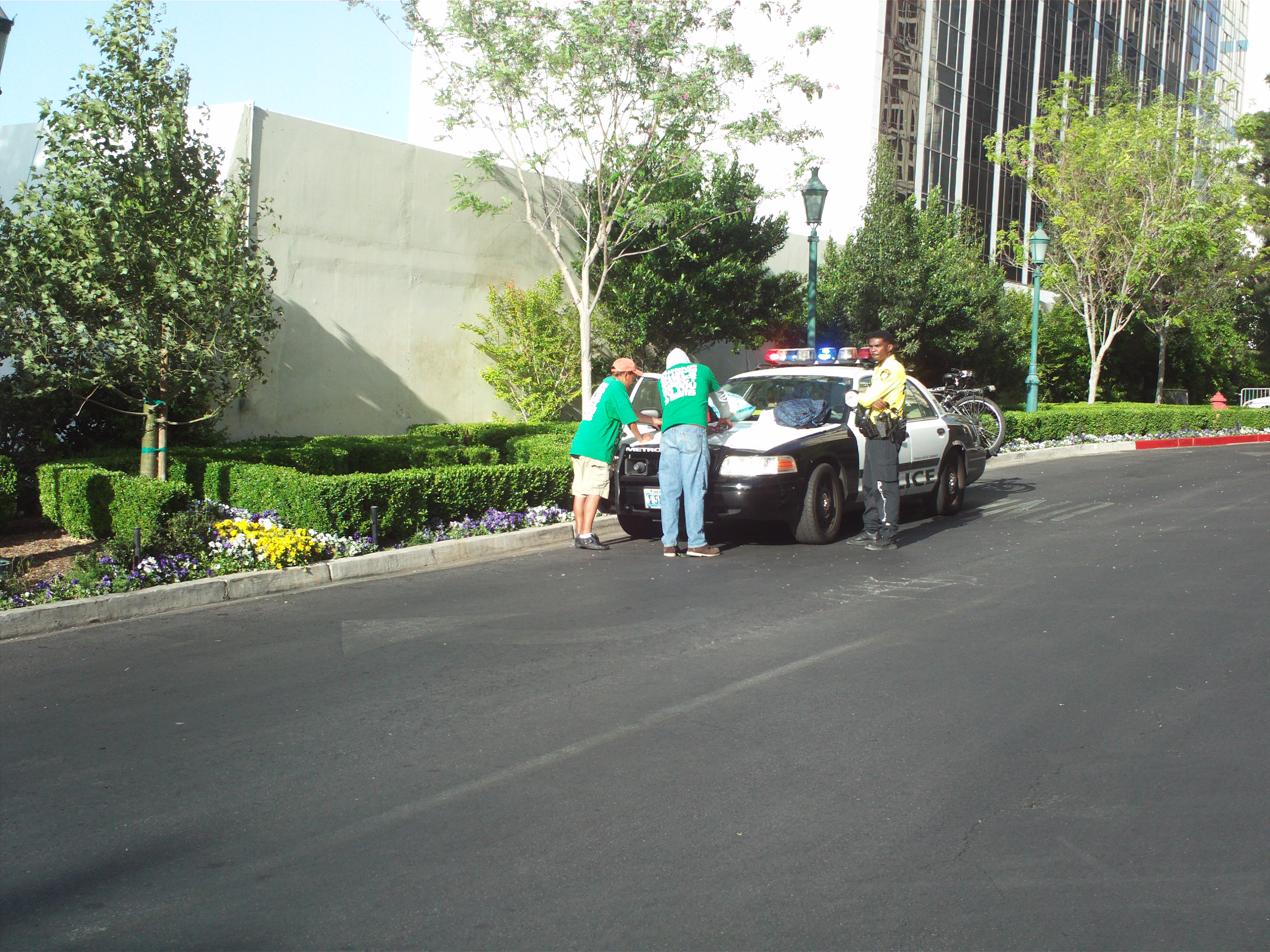
A Las Vegas Metropolitan Police Department officer at a call for service in 2013. The call involved two people handing out business cards for sex workers at the Las Vegas Strip.

A call for service (CFS, also known as a job, hitch, incident, callout, call-out, or simply a call) is an incident that emergency services or public safety organizations (such as police, fire departments, and emergency medical services) are assigned to resolve, handle, or assist with. Operationally, a call for service is any incident where emergency services are a third-party intervener, regardless of whether their presence was requested or they came across it in the course of their duties.

The term "call" originates from the telephone calls made by the public to emergency telephone numbers to report the incident to dispatchers and request an emergency service response. There are two types of calls for service: dispatched calls, which are made by members of the public through emergency number calls; and self-initiated, self-generated, or directed calls, which are made by emergency services personnel.

After a call for service is received, it is given a basic "call type" and designated response code by the dispatcher for transmission and assignment. The call types issued by dispatchers can often be vague due to predefined types issued by their agency or jurisdiction's legal code, such as "Alarm" and "Unknown Trouble".

As it pertains to police work, when the call for service is broadcast over the radio, it is assigned to an officer who patrols the specific sector or beat within which the call for service originates. Once assigned, the officer must respond and issue some type of finality back to the dispatcher indicating the action taken in order to essentially "finish" that particular call and prepare the patrol shift for the next call. Multiple calls for service may be assigned at once to several patrol beats and, depending on the severity or urgency of the call, multiple calls may be assigned to one individual officer or pair of officers, to be handled in a "queue" of priority.
