= Wildland water tender =

Specialized vehicle

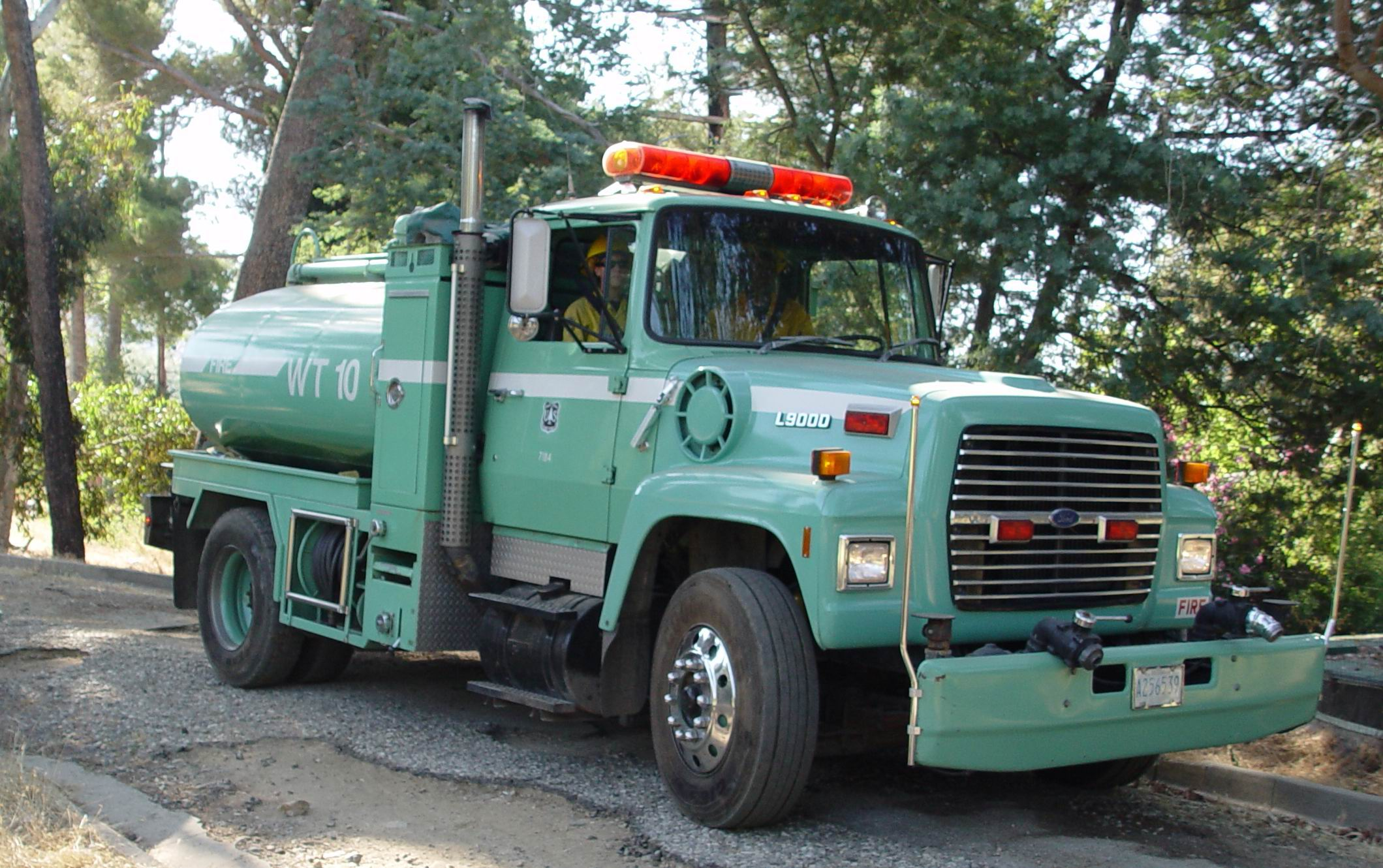
A Type 2 Tactical water tender belonging to the United States Forest Service.

A wildland water tender is a specialized vehicle capable of bringing water, foam, or dry chemicals to fire trucks in the field that are engaged on the fireline. Water tenders have a large truck mounted tank that carries a minimum 1,000 gallons and up to 4,000 gallons of water. These vehicles are specifically designed for fire fighting often with four-wheel drive, rugged suspension and high wheel clearance for mountainous dirt road conditions.

Support water tenders have larger water tanks and are staffed with one person. They deliver water to fire engines and large portable tanks that are connected to hose lays (hose rolled out on the ground for knocking down fires and for mop up). Tactical water tenders are capable of performing some of the functions of a wildland fire engine, such as deploying lengths of hose. Two people staff this type of water tender. Unlike support water tenders, tactical water tenders are capable of a technique of pump-and-roll. The vehicles engine can power a pump while the vehicle is being driven, so the second firefighter uses a short hose to spray water on the fire. This technique allows a team of two to flank the perimeter of a fire.

== Water Tender Types ==
In the fall of 2007, the National Wildfire Coordinating Group agreed on a set of standards for all water tenders that are used for wildland firefighting. Water tenders are divided into support tenders and tactical tenders.

Municipal or structural fire department also use water tenders with much larger water capacities for areas of structures that may lack fire hydrants, in case of "dry hydrants" (faulty hydrants that will not provide water flow) or in sustained cold sub-zero weather, which may freeze underground water lines. These tenders might be tractor/trailer trucks carrying 8,000 gallons or more. These water tenders might be equipped with associated fire station equipment including required number of breathing apparatus, first aid kits, telescopic ladders, heat-resisting fiberglass blankets, overall suits, electrically insulated rubber hand gloves, fireman's axes with insulated handle, fireman's helmets made of fiberglass, leather belt and pouch for axe, etc.

Minimum Standards by Type
	Tender Type				
	Support			Tactical	
Requirements	S1	S2	S3	T1	T2
Tank capacity	4,000 US gal (15,000 L)	2,500 US gal (9,500 L)	1,000 US gal (3,800 L)	2,000 US gal (7,600 L)	1,000 US gal (3,800 L)
Minimum flow rate	300 US gal/min (68 m^{3}/h)	200 US gal/min (45 m^{3}/h)	200 US gal/min (45 m^{3}/h)	250 US gal/min (57 m^{3}/h)	250 US gal/min (57 m^{3}/h)
Minimum pressure	50 psi (340 kPa)	50 psi (340 kPa)	50 psi (340 kPa)	150 psi (1,000 kPa)	150 psi (1,000 kPa)
Pump and Roll	No	No	No	Yes	Yes

== NFPA 1906 ==
Additionally, there are requirements laid out by the National Fire Protection Association in NFPA 1906: Standard for Wildland Fire Apparatus. According to the National Fire Protection Association, apparatuses used mostly for outdoor or wildland fires are considered wildland fire apparatuses and must meet the standards laid out.
