= San Ramon Valley Fire Protection District =

Coordinates: 37°46′48″N 121°58′41″W

Operational area
- Country: United States
- State: California
- Cities: San Ramon; Danville; Alamo; Diablo; Camino Tassajara
- Address: 2401 Crow Canyon Road, STE A, San Ramon, CA 94583

Agency overview
- Established: 1963
- Annual calls: 9,788 (2017)
- Employees: 185 (2017)
- Annual budget: $81,348,924 (2018)
- Staffing: Career
- Fire chief: Jonas Aguiar
- IAFF: 3546

Facilities and equipment
- Battalions: 2
- Stations: 10
- Engines: 9
- Trucks: 2
- Rescues: 1
- Ambulances: 5
- HAZMAT: 1
- USAR: 1
- Wildland: 9 - Type 3
- Light and air: 1

Website
- Official website
- IAFF website

The San Ramon Valley Fire Protection District provides fire protection and emergency medical services for the cities of Alamo, Blackhawk, Danville, Diablo, Camino Tassajara and San Ramon as well as southern areas of the Morgan Territory in California, United States. In all, the district is responsible for 155 square miles (400 km^{2}) with a population of approximately 192,800.

== History ==
The San Ramon Valley Fire Protection District was first started in 1912, when it was decided that a volunteer fire department needed to be organized to provide services to the community. This first department became known as the Danville Farm Defense Fire District. In 1921, after a state law was passed allowing the organization of special fire districts, the district was renamed the Danville Fire Protection District and expanded to cover nearly 50 square miles (130 km^{2}).

In 1963, Contra Costa County reorganized its East County Fire Protection District into the San Ramon Fire Protection District, an independent district. This led to the Local Agency Formation Commission consolidating the two districts into one on July 1, 1980.

== USAR Task Force 4 ==
The district is part of Urban Search and Rescue California Task Force 4 (CA-TF4) which is one of eight FEMA Urban Search and Rescue Task Forces in California. The task force, which is based in Oakland, is sponsored by the Oakland Fire Department.

== Stations and apparatus ==
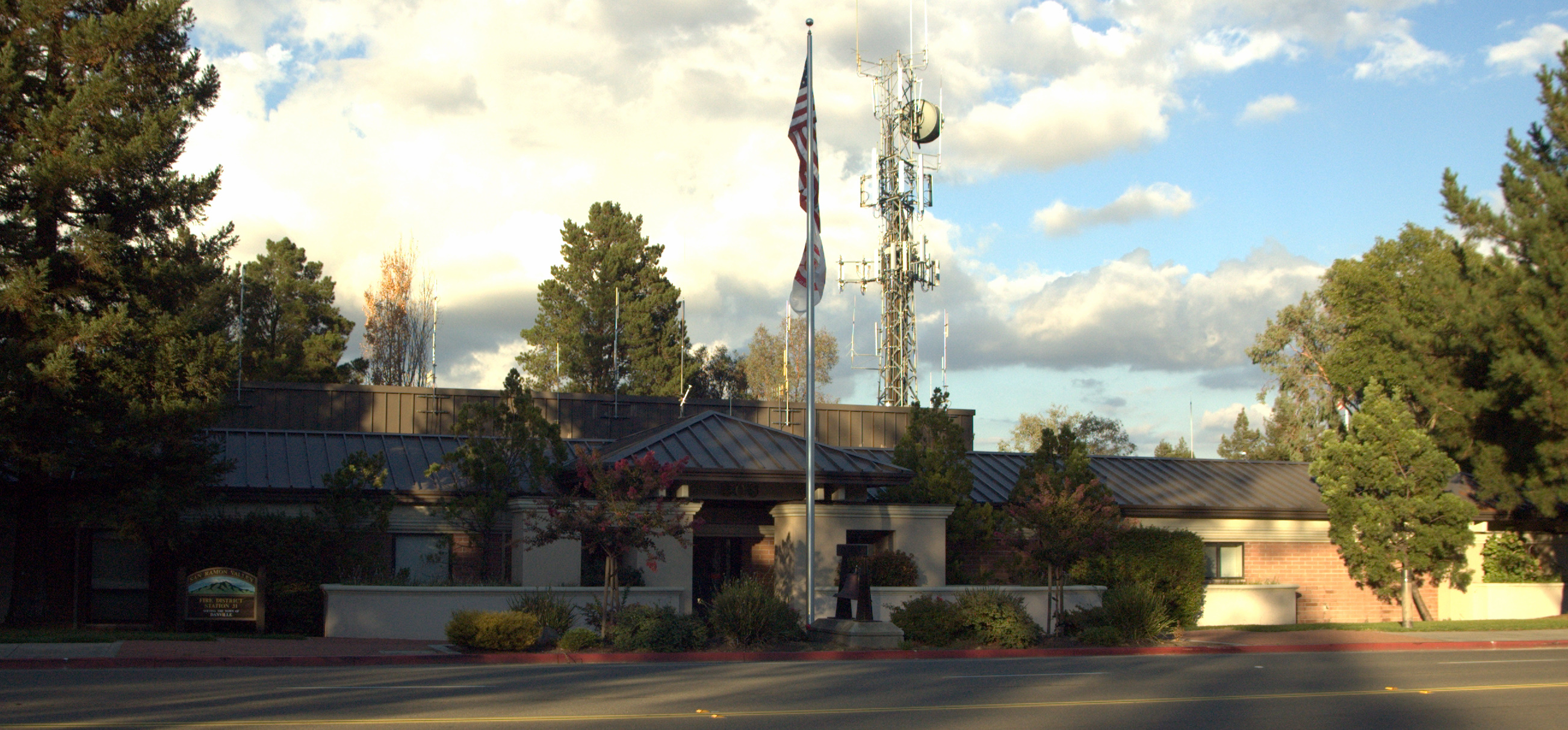
Station 31

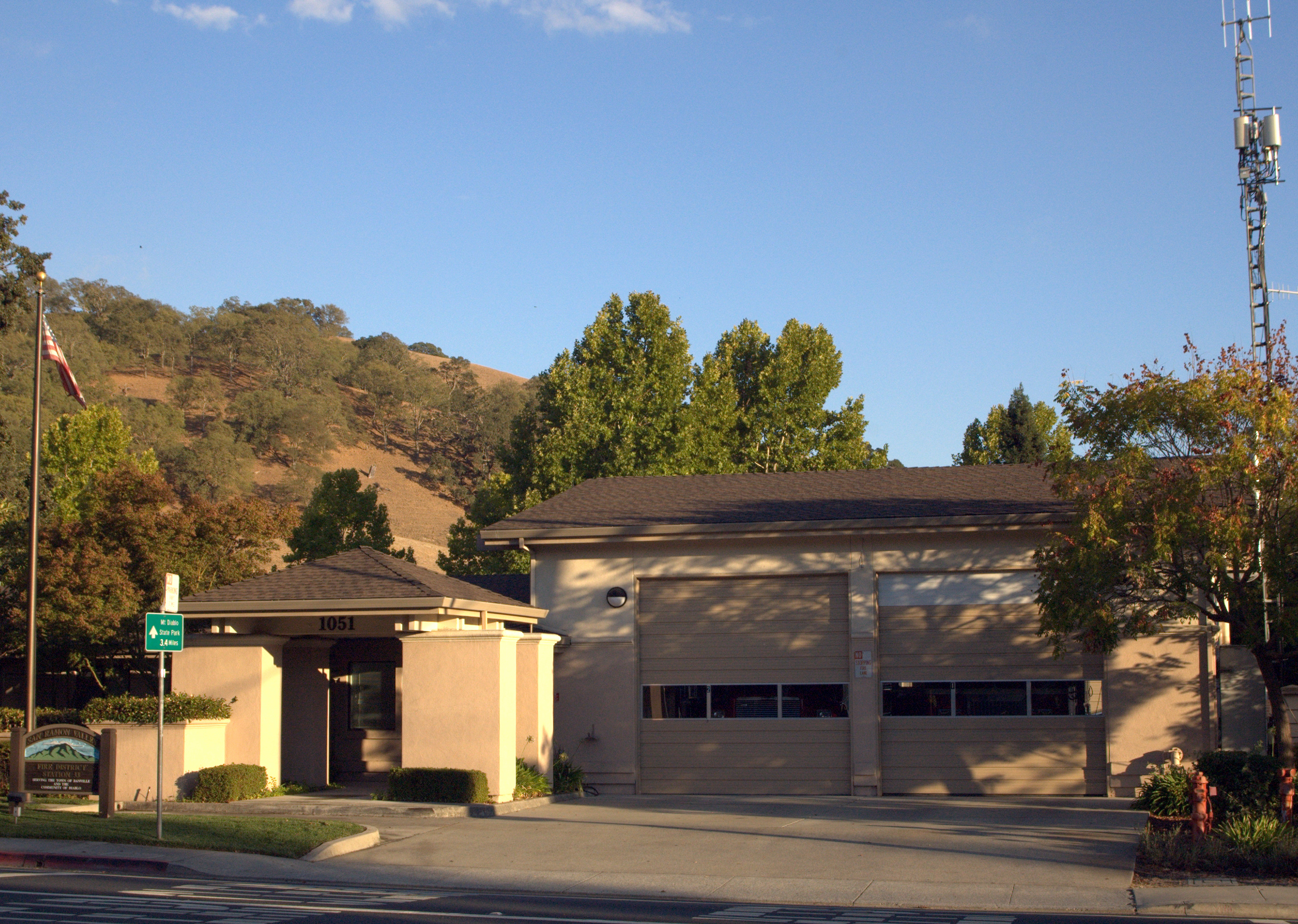
Station 33

The district has 10 stations spread across the 155 square miles (400 km^{2}) of responsible area.

Fire Station Number	City	Engine Company	Truck Company	Reserve Rescue Medic or Paramedic Unit	Wildland Unit	Specialized units
30	San Ramon	Engine 30		Rescue Medic 30 (Reserve)	Engine 630	Water Tender 30
31	Danville	Engine 31	Truck 31	Paramedic 31	Engine 331	Breathing Support 31, Communications Support 31, HazMat 31, Battalion 31
32	Alamo	Engine 32; Engine 32A		Paramedic 32	Engine 332	
33	Danville	Engine 33		Rescue Medic 33 (Reserve)	Engine 633	Multiple Casualty Unit 33
34	San Ramon	Engine 34	Truck 34	Rescue Medic 34 (Reserve)	Engine 334	Urban Search and Rescue (USAR)134
35	Danville	Engine 35		Paramedic 35	Engine 335	Water Tender 35
36	Danville	Engine 36		Rescue Medic 36 (Reserve)	Engine 336	
37	Livermore	Engine 37			Engine 337	
38	San Ramon	Engine 38		Paramedic 38	Engine 638	Water Tender 38
39	San Ramon	Engine 39		Paramedic 39	Engine 339	
