= Berkeley Fire Department =

Fire department in Berkeley, California

Coordinates: 37.87°N 122.27°W

Operational area
- Country: United States
- State: California
- County: Alameda

Agency overview
- Established: 1904
- Annual calls: 17,713 (2023)
- Employees: 144
- Annual budget: $45,434,206 (FY 2021)
- Staffing: Career
- Fire chief: David Sprauge
- EMS level: ALS
- IAFF: 1227

Facilities and equipment
- Battalions: 1
- Stations: 7
- Engines: 7 - Front line 3 - Reserve
- Trucks: 2 - Front line 1 - Reserve
- Ambulances: 4 - ALS
- HAZMAT: 1
- Wildland: 1 - Type 3; 2 - Type 6

Website
- Berkeley Fire Department
- www.bffa1227.org

The Berkeley Fire Department (BFD) provides fire protection and emergency medical services to the city of Berkeley, California, United States as well as the University of California, Berkeley.

== History ==
In 1877, volunteer fire companies were first organized. On October 22, 1904 the Berkeley City Hall was destroyed by a fire and shortly thereafter a paid department was formed. In 1914, the Berkeley Fire Department became the first department west of the Mississippi to be fully motorized. In 1923, over 600 homes and businesses were destroyed by the 1923 Berkeley, California fire. In 1977, the fire department placed ambulances into service and took over the responsibility of emergency medical transport from the police department. In 1986, the department began providing paramedic level emergency medical services to the city. In 1991, 63 homes in Berkeley burned down during the Oakland firestorm of 1991.

== Stations & Equipment ==
The Berkeley Fire Department operates out of 7 Fire Stations, located throughout the city. Beginning in July 2017 the Berkeley Fire Department has added staffing for a 4th ambulance.

Fire Station Number	Address	Engine Company	Truck Company	Medic Unit	Command Unit	Wildland Engine	Special Operations Units	Other Units
1	2442 Eighth Street	Engine 1		Medic 1			Water Tender 1	Reserve Ambulance
2	2029 Berkeley Way	Engine 2	Truck 2	Medic 2	Battalion 2 Ems 2	Wildland engine 602 Type 6	HazMat 2	Reserve Truck; Reserve Ambulance
3	2710 Russell Street	Engine 3		Medic 3				
4	1900 Marin Avenue	Engine 4					1912 Segrave (Parade Engine)	Reserve Engine
5	2680 Shattuck Avenue	Engine 5	Truck 5	Medic 5		Wildland engine 305 Type 3		Reserve Engine
6	999 Cedar Street	Engine 6						Reserve Engine
7	3000 Shasta Road	Engine 7				Cal OES Engine 2612 Type 6	QRV 7	

== See also ==
- Berkeley
- Oakland Fire Department
- Alameda County Fire Department
