= Livermore-Pleasanton Fire Department =

Fire department in California, U.S.

Coordinates: 37°40′0.24″N 121°51′25.91″W

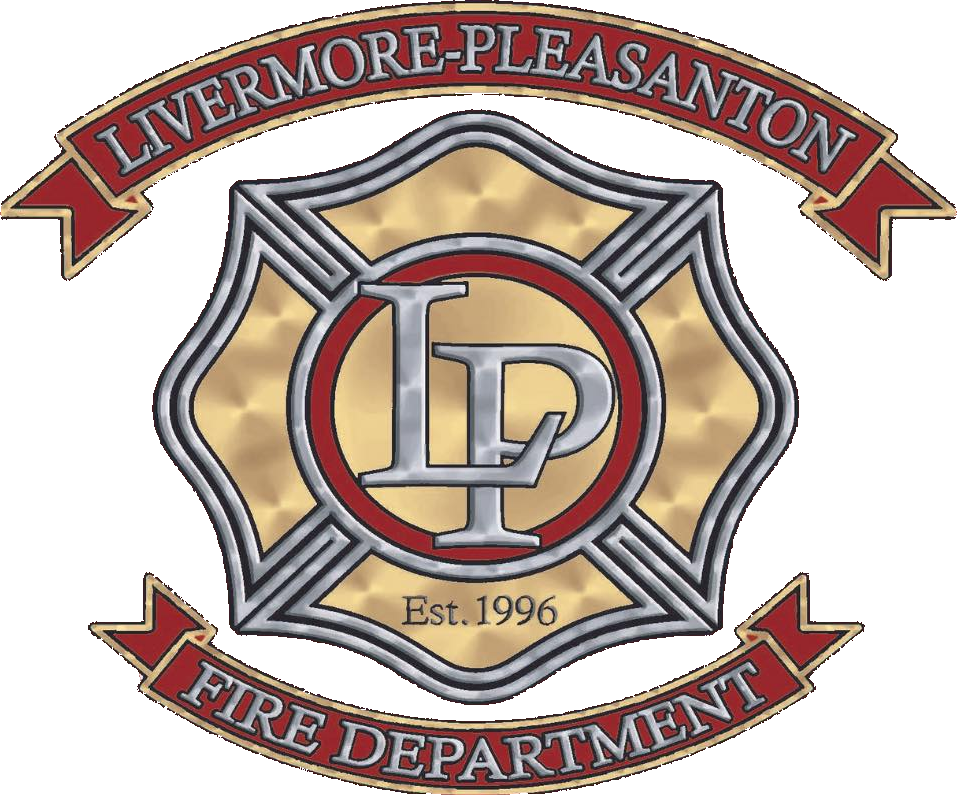

Operational area
- Country: United States
- State: California
- Cities: Livermore; Pleasanton

Agency overview
- Annual calls: 14,443 (2017)
- Employees: 121 (2017)
- Annual budget: $36,720,370 (17/18)
- Staffing: Career
- Fire chief: Joseph Testa
- EMS level: ALS
- IAFF: 1974

Facilities and equipment
- Battalions: 2
- Stations: 10
- Engines: 8
- Trucks: 2
- HAZMAT: 1
- Wildland: 6 – Type 6; 3 – Type 3

Website
- Official website
- IAFF website

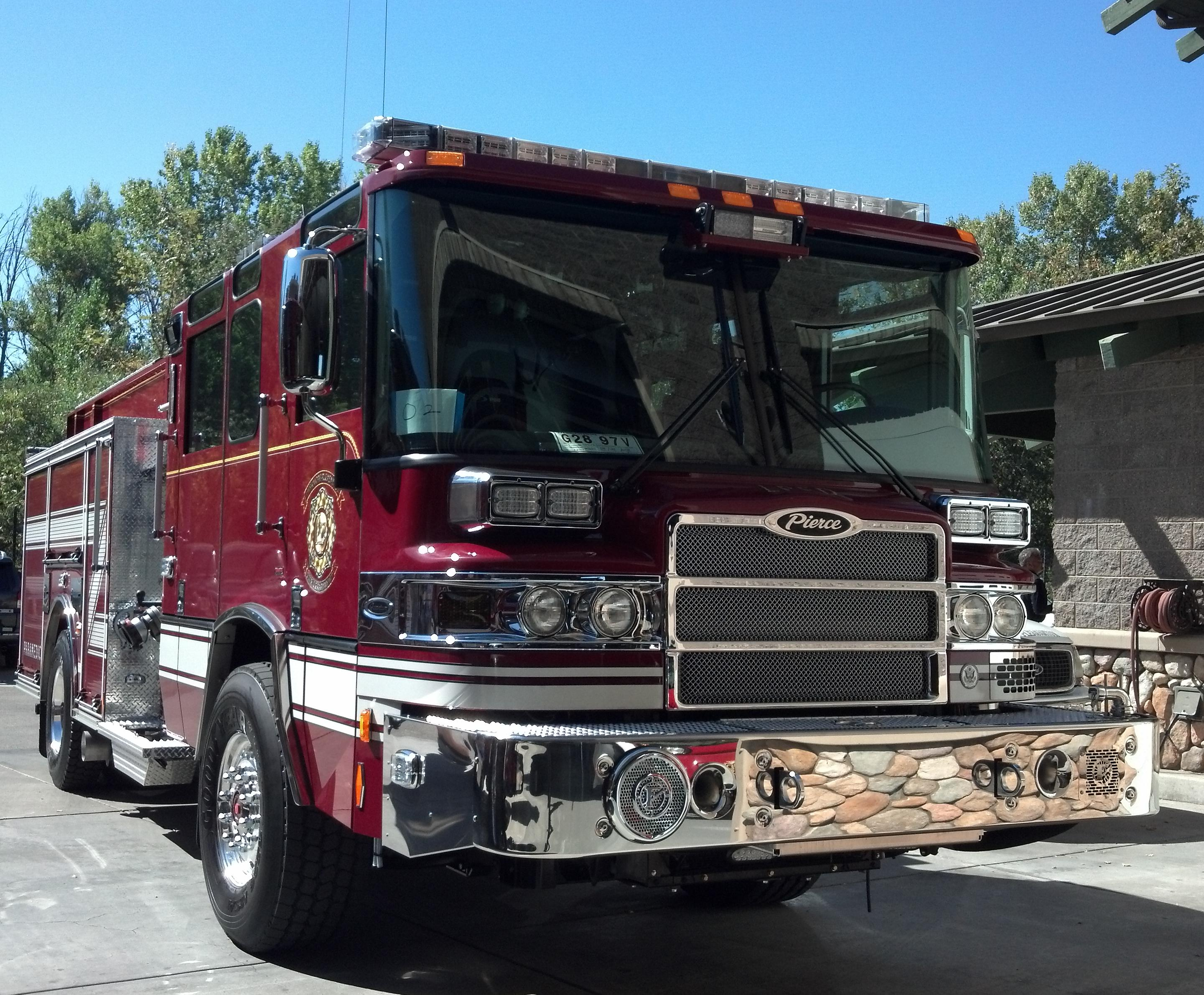
Engine 91

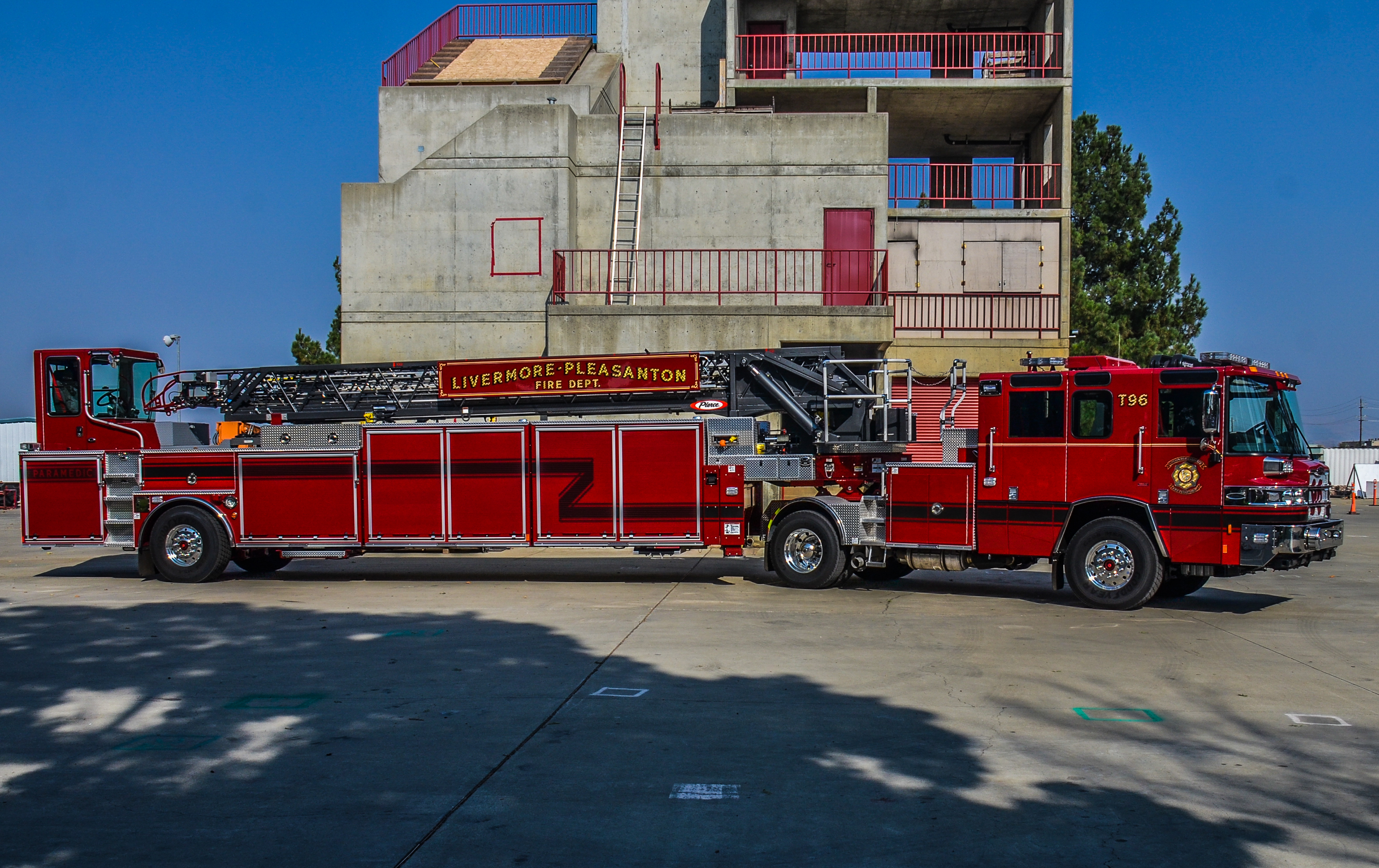
Truck 96 at Training Tower

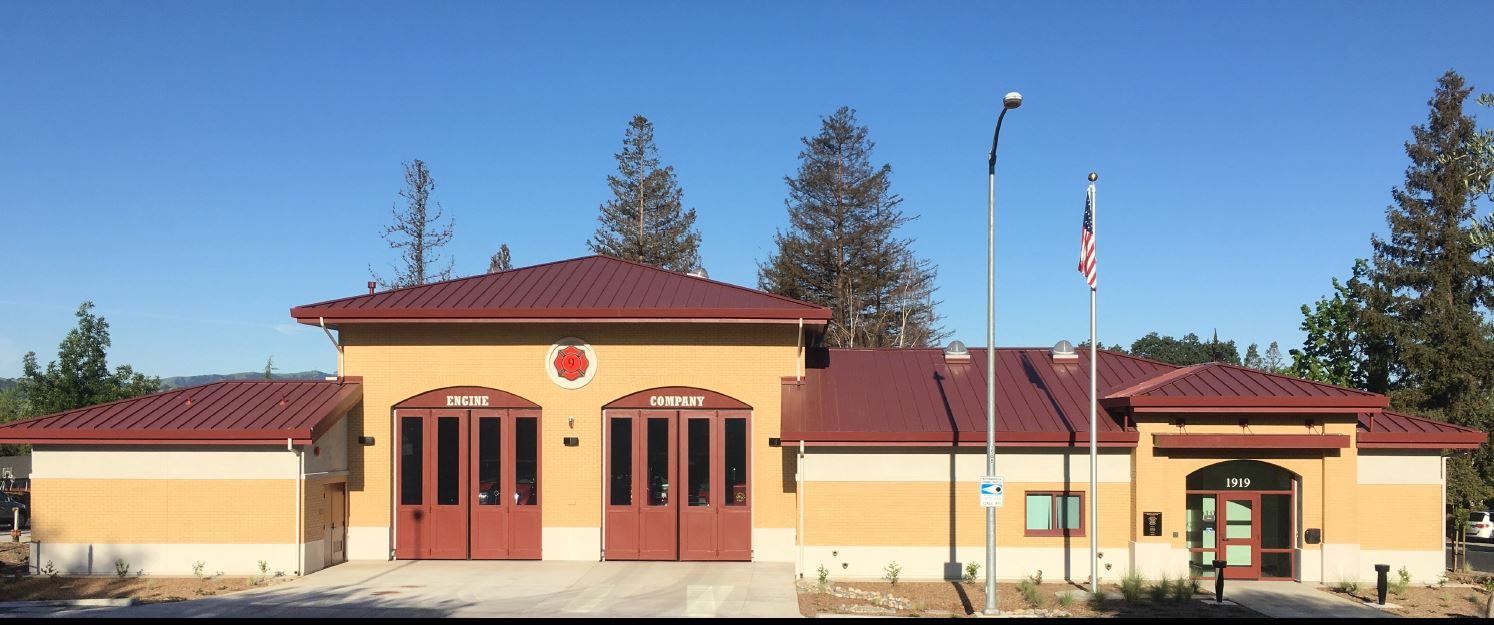
Station 9

The Livermore-Pleasanton Fire Department (LPFD) provides fire suppression and emergency medical services to the neighboring cities of Livermore and Pleasanton, California. The organization uses a joint powers authority (JPA) model.

== Centennial Light ==
Firehouse Six houses the Centennial Light, the world's longest-lasting light bulb, located at 4550 East Avenue in Livermore. The department says that the bulb is 125 years old and has been turned off only a handful of times. Due to its longevity, the bulb has been noted by The Guinness Book of World Records, Ripley's Believe It or Not!, and General Electric. It has also featured in an episode of Mythbusters.

== USAR Task Force 4 ==
The LPFD has multiple members in the California USAR Task Force 4 (CA-TF4) one of the eight FEMA Urban Search and Rescue Task Forces in the state. The task force is based in Oakland and is sponsored by the Oakland Fire Department.

== Stations and apparatus ==
The Livermore-Pleasanton Fire Department has ten fire houses spread across both Pleasanton and Livermore.

Firehouse	City	Engine companies	Truck companies	Wildland engine Companies	Other units
1	Pleasanton	Engine 91		Engine 691	Rescue Boat 91, UTV 91, Battalion 9
2	Pleasanton	Engine 92		Engine 392	HAZMAT 92
3	Pleasanton		Truck 93	Engine 693	
4	Pleasanton	Engine 94		Engine 394	OES 340
5	Pleasanton	Engine 95		Engine 695	
6	Livermore		Truck 96	Engine 696	Utility 96, Breathing Support 96
7	Livermore	Engine 97		Engine 697	Battalion 10
8	Livermore	Engine 98		Engine 698	
9	Livermore	Engine 99		Engine 399	
10	Livermore	Engine 90		Engine 690	

== Firefighters Foundation ==
The Livermore-Pleasanton Firefighters Foundation is a non-profit organization created to support injured and fallen firefighters, police, EMS personnel, and their families both locally and across the state.

== Dispatch ==
Communications and dispatch services are provided by the Alameda County Regional Emergency Communications Center (ACRECC) located at nearby Lawrence Livermore National Laboratory.
