= Firefighting apparatus =

Vehicle for use during firefighting operations

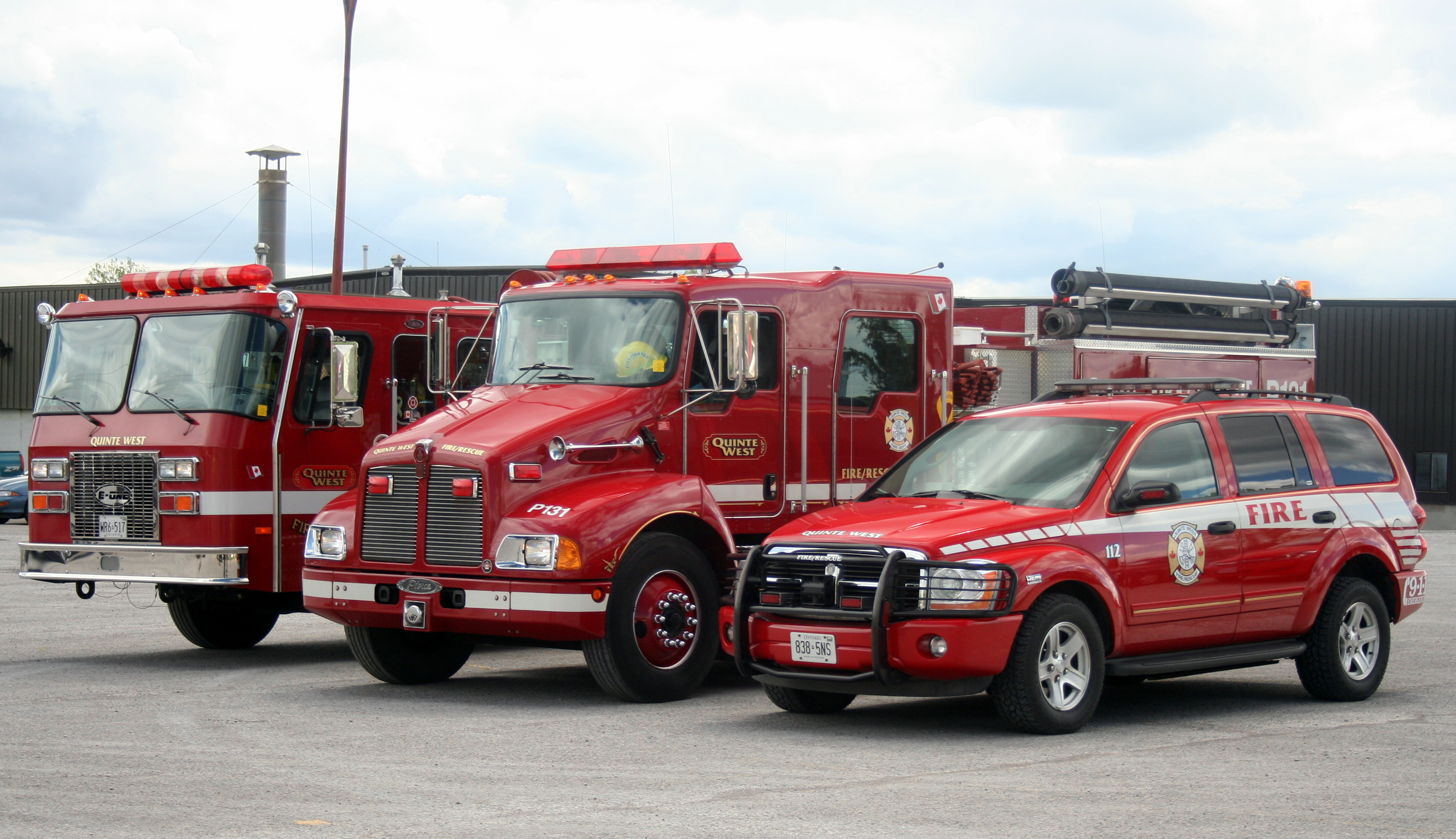
A fire engine, water tender, and fire command vehicle, three examples of firefighting apparatus

A firefighting apparatus (North American English) or firefighting appliance (UK English) is any vehicle that has been customized for use during firefighting operations. These vehicles are highly customized depending on their needs and the duty they will be performing. These duties can include firefighting, technical rescue, and emergency medical services.

== History ==
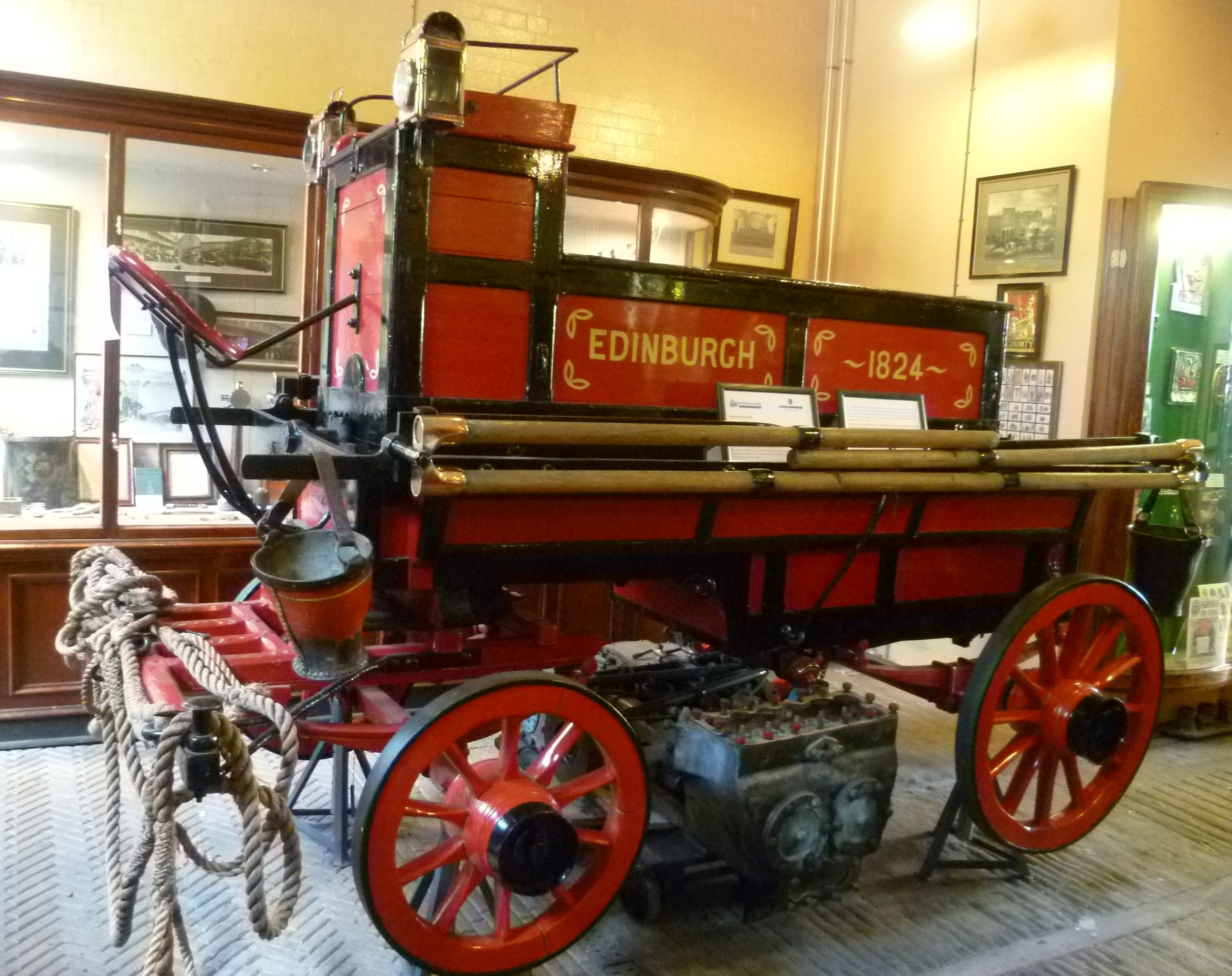
Manually drawn fire pump in service in Edinburgh in 1824

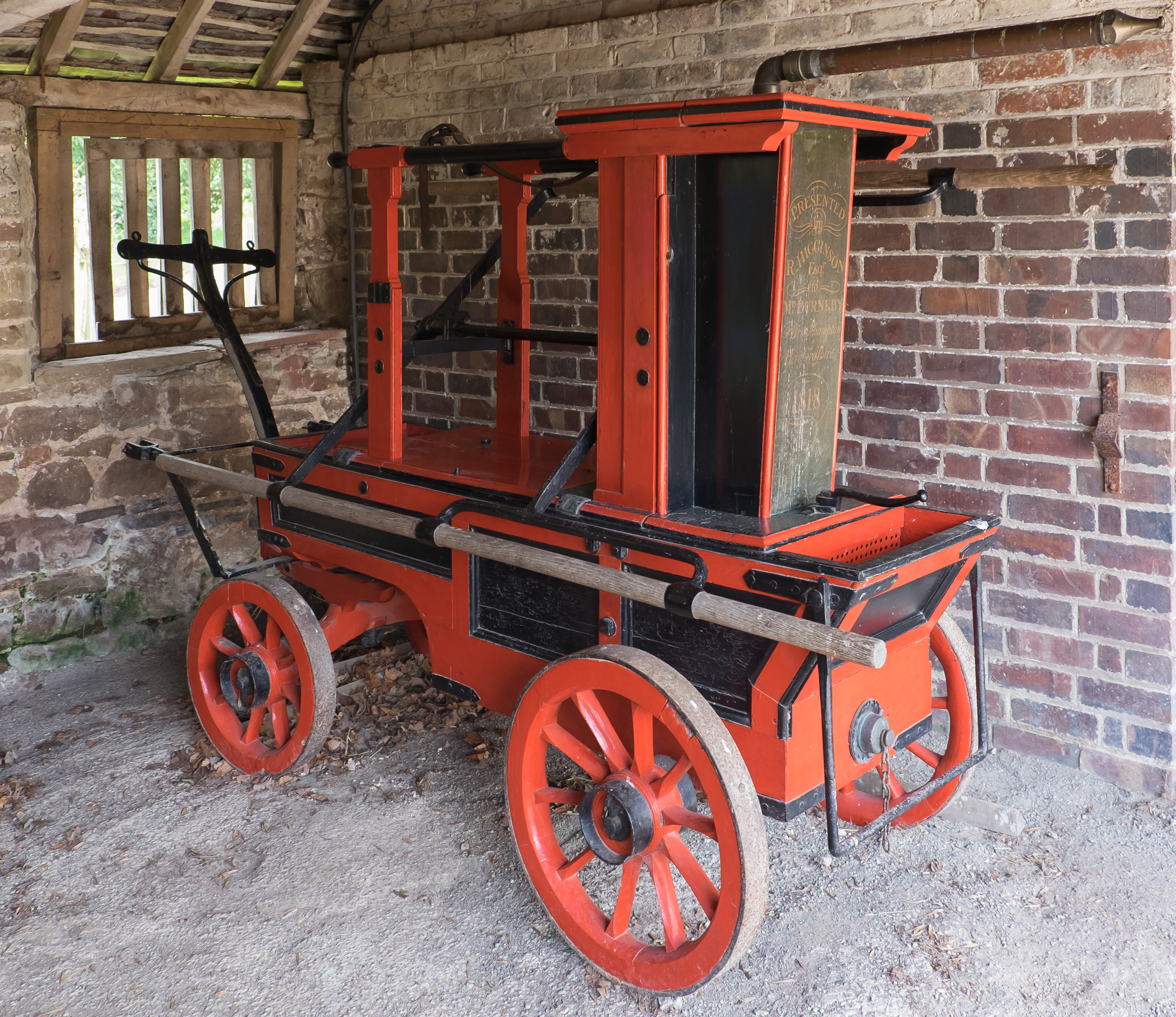
Horse-drawn fire pump given to Brockhampton Estate in 1818

An early device used to squirt water onto a fire is a squirt or fire syringe. Hand squirts and hand pumps are noted before Ctesibius of Alexandria invented the first fire pump circa the 2nd century B.C., and an example of a force-pump possibly used for a fire-engine is mentioned by Heron of Alexandria. The fire pump was reinvented in Europe during the 16th century, reportedly used in Augsburg in 1518 and Nuremberg in 1657. A book of 1655 inventions mentions a steam engine (called a fire engine) pump used to "raise a column of water 40 feet [12.2 m]", but there was no mention of whether it was portable.

Colonial laws in America required each house to have a bucket of water on the front stoop during fires at night. These buckets were intended for use by the initial bucket brigade that would supply the water at fires. Philadelphia obtained a hand-pumped fire engine in 1719, years after Lynn's 1654 model appeared there, made by Joseph Jencks, but before New York's two engines arrived from London.

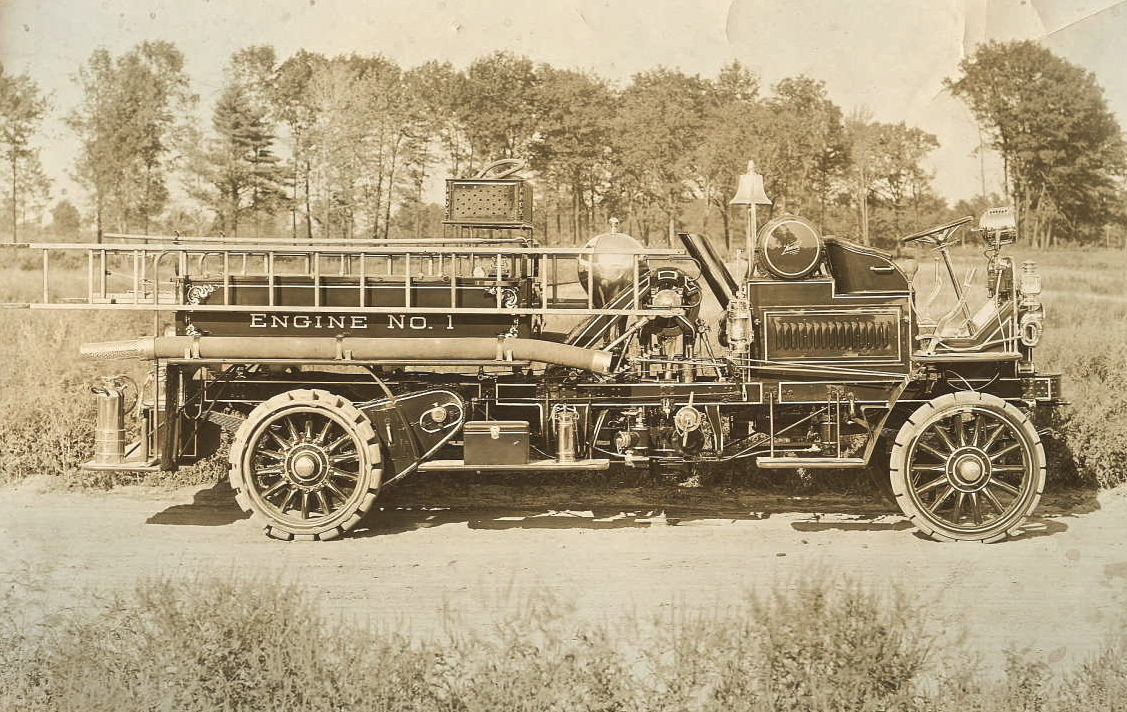
Knox fire engine, one of the first modern fire engines, manufactured in 1905 in Springfield, Massachusetts by the Knox Automobile Company

By 1730, Richard Newsham, in London, had made successful fire engines; the first used in New York City (in 1731) were of his make (six years before formation of the NYC volunteer fire department). The amount of manpower and skill necessary for firefighting prompted the institution of an organized fire company by Benjamin Franklin in 1737. Thomas Lote built the first fire engine made in America in 1743. These earliest engines are called hand tubs because they are manually (hand) powered and the water was supplied by bucket brigade dumped into a tub (cistern) where the pump had a permanent intake pipe. An important advancement around 1822 was the invention of an engine which could draft water from a water source doing away with the bucket brigade. Philadelphia fire engine manufacturers Sellers and Pennock model the Hydraulion is said to be the first suction engine produced in 1822. Some models had the hard, suction hose fixed to the intake and curled up over the apparatus known as a "squirrel tail" engine.

The earliest engines were small and were carried by four men or mounted on skids and dragged to a fire. The earliest four-wheel carriage mounted engines were pulled to the fire by hand. As the engines grew larger they became horse-drawn and later self-propelled by steam engines. John Ericsson is credited with building the first American steam-powered fire engine. John Braithwaite built the first steam fire-engine in Britain.

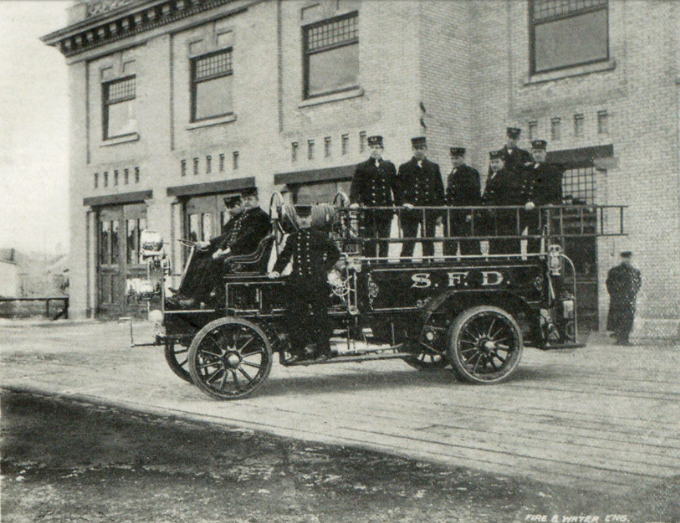
An early motorized fire engine of the Saskatoon Fire Department, in Saskatoon, Saskatchewan

Until the mid-19th century, most fire engines were maneuvered by men, but the introduction of horse-drawn fire engines considerably improved the response time to incidents. The first self-propelled steam-driven fire engine was built in New York in 1841. It was the target of sabotage by firefighters and its use was discontinued, and motorized fire engines did not become commonplace until the early 1900s. The dawn of the 20th Century brought about the age of the motorized fire apparatus. One of the first self-propelled fire engines of that era was introduced in 1903 for the Niagara Engine Company of New London, Connecticut. It was driven by a steam-powered engine, as opposed to an internal combustion engine which proved to be more popular. By 1905, the idea of combining gasoline engine motor trucks into fire engines was attracting great attention; according to a Popular Mechanics article in that year, such trucks were rapidly gaining popularity in England. That same year, the Knox Automobile Company of Springfield, Massachusetts began selling what some have described as the world's first modern fire engine. A year later, the City of Springfield had an entire modern fire department supplied with Knox fire engines. In 1906, the Waterous Company introduced a fire engine with two gasoline-powered engines, one for propulsion and the other for pumping.

For many years firefighters sat on the sides of the fire engines, or even stood on the rear of the vehicles, exposed to the elements. This arrangement was uncomfortable and dangerous (some firefighters were thrown to their deaths when their fire engines made sharp turns), and today nearly all fire engines have fully enclosed seating areas for their crews.

== Types of apparatus ==
- Aerial firefighting apparatus
  - Helitack
- Fireboat
- Fire bike
- Fire engine
  - Quint
  - Wildland fire engine
  - Airport crash tender
- Water tender
  - Wildland water tender
- Heavy rescue vehicle
- Light and air unit
- Hazardous materials apparatus
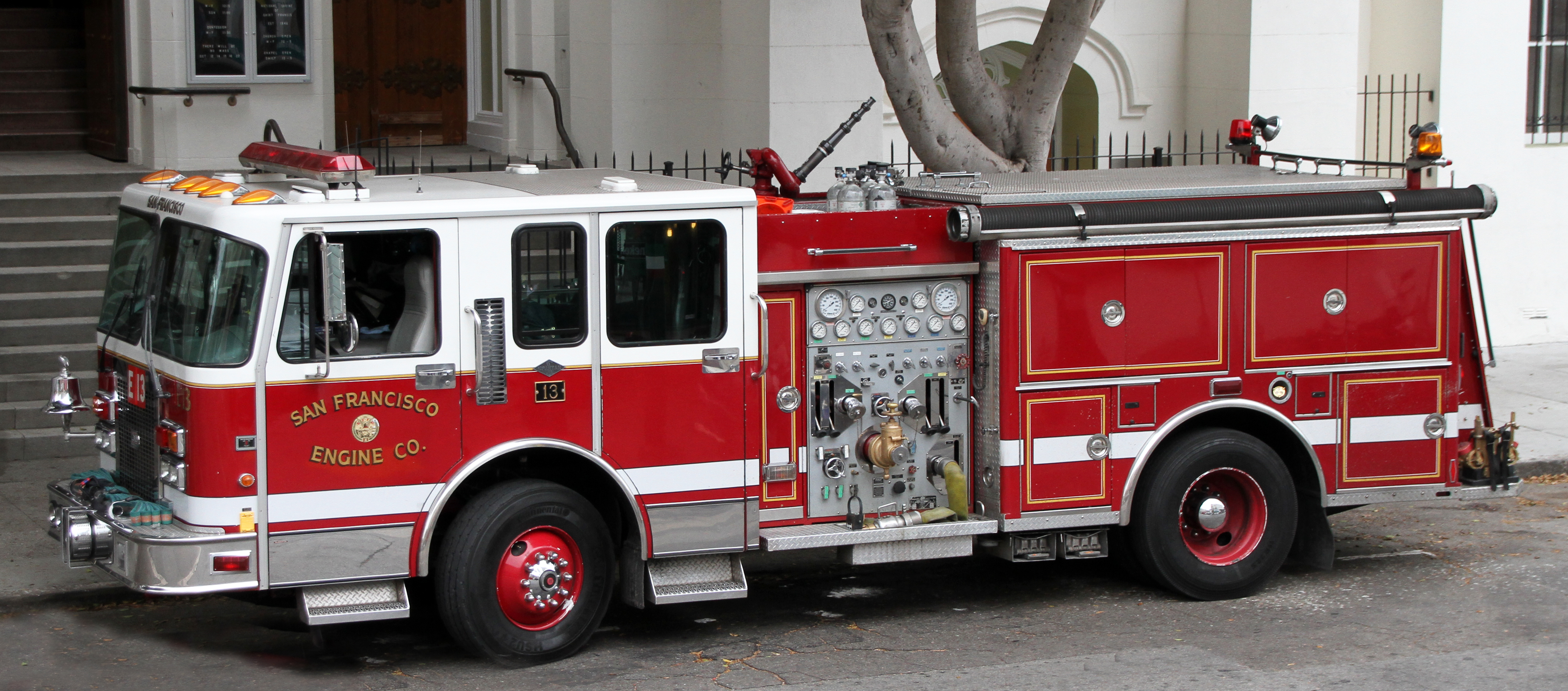
Fire engine

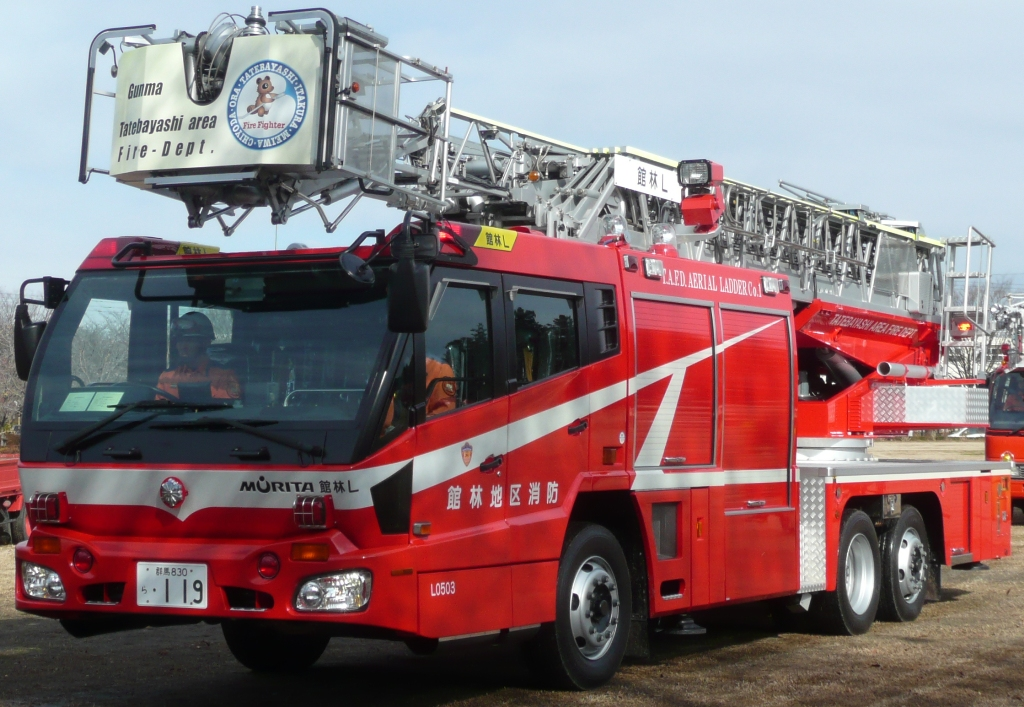
Ladder (or tower) truck

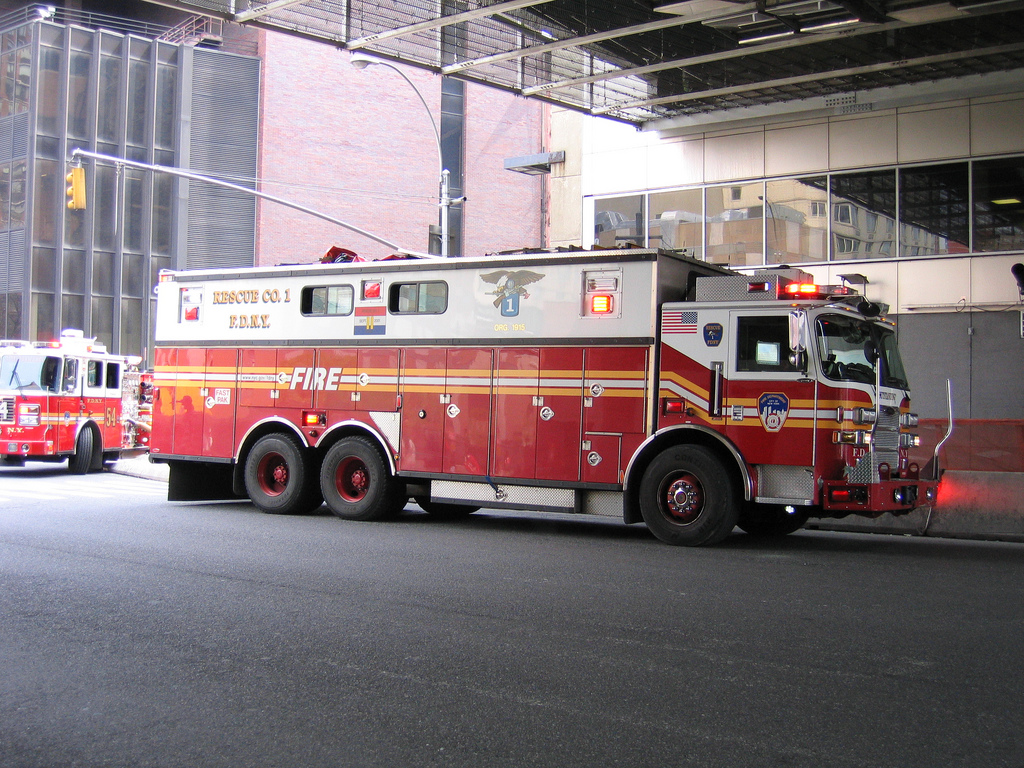
Rescue vehicle

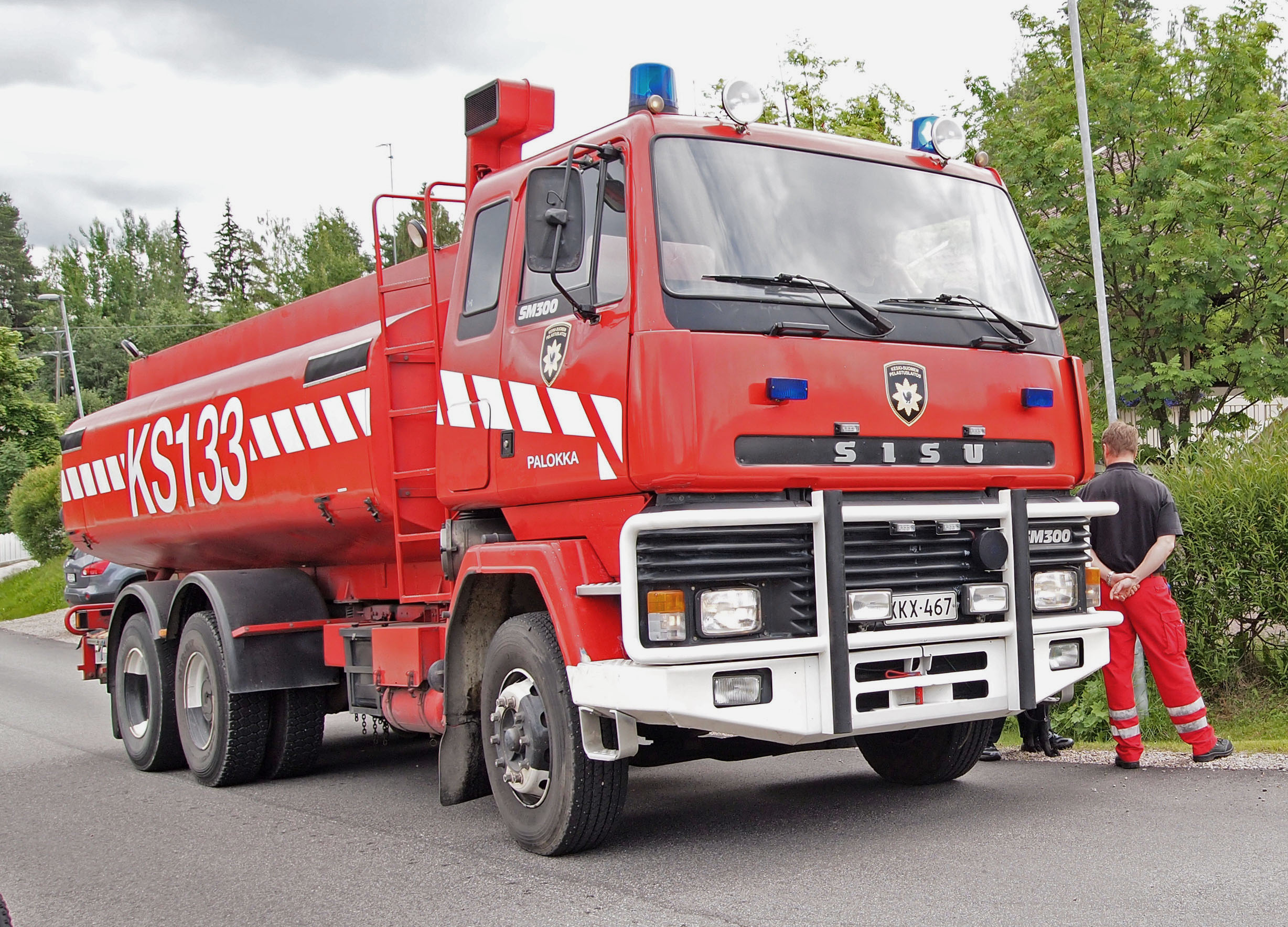
Water tender (or tanker)

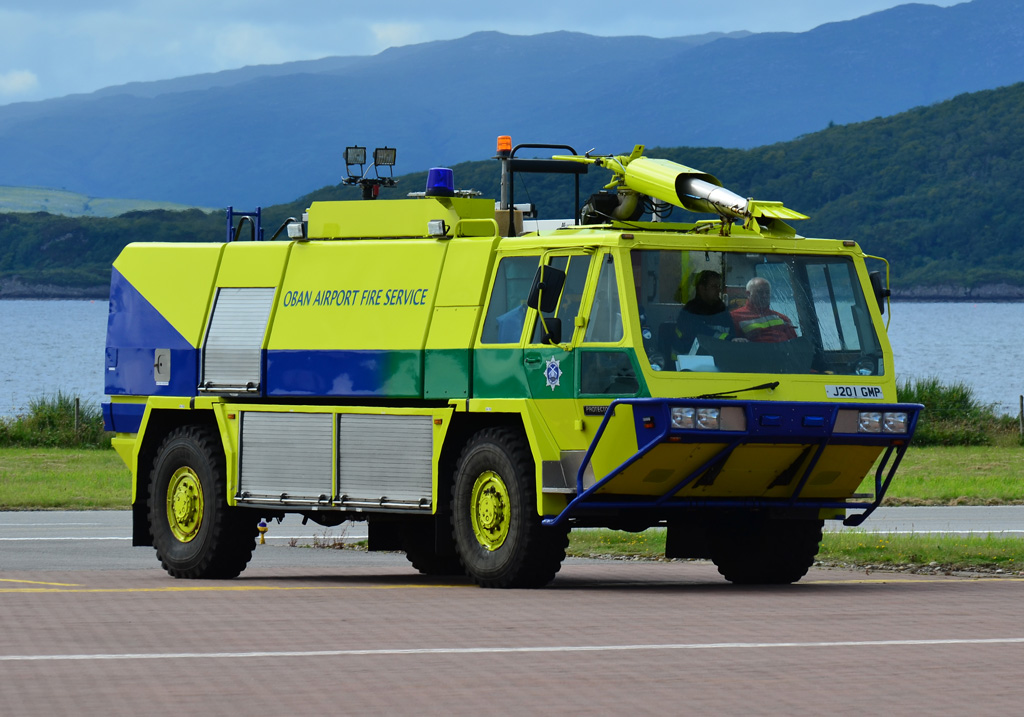
Airport crash tender

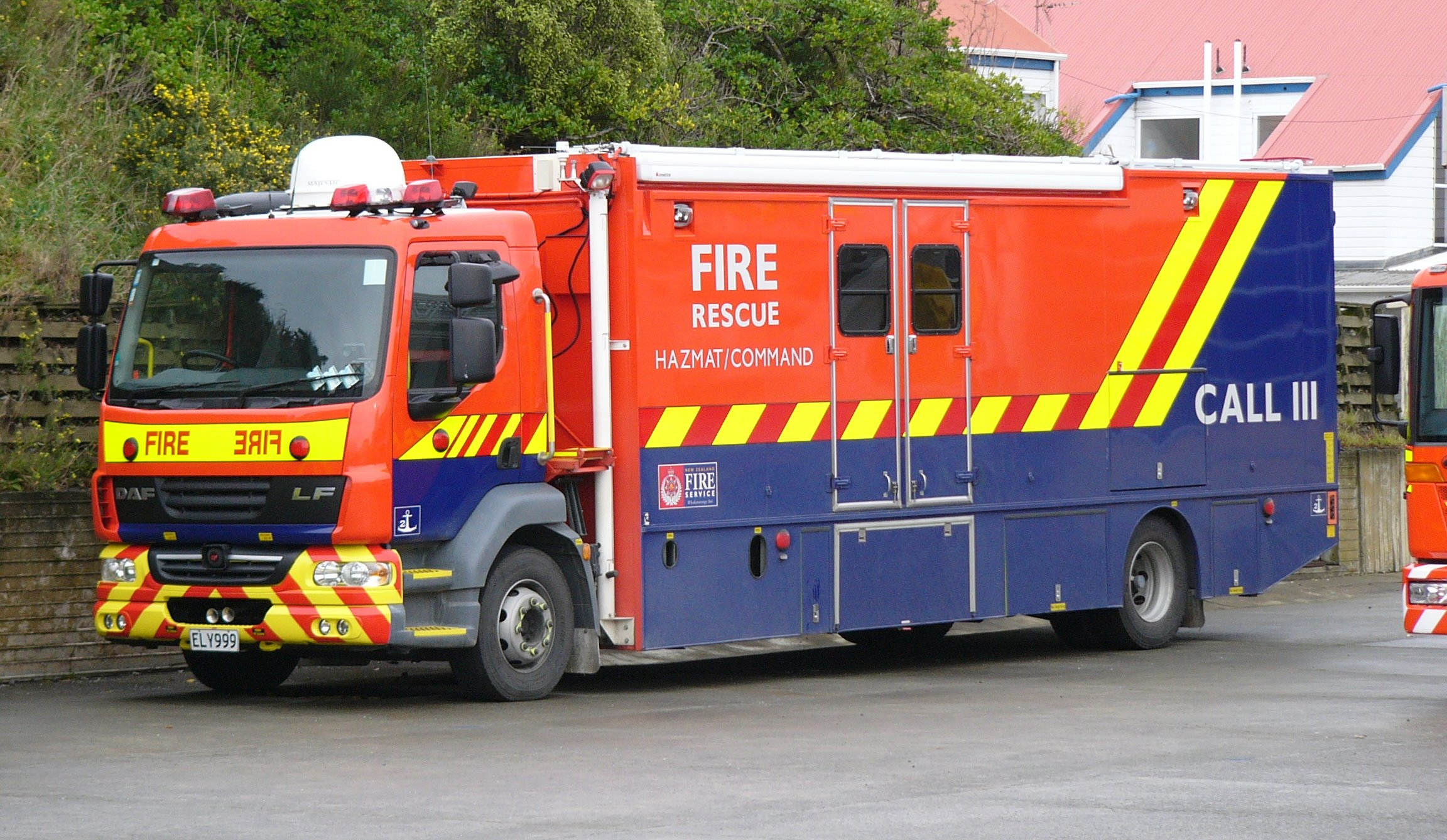
Hazardous materials apparatus

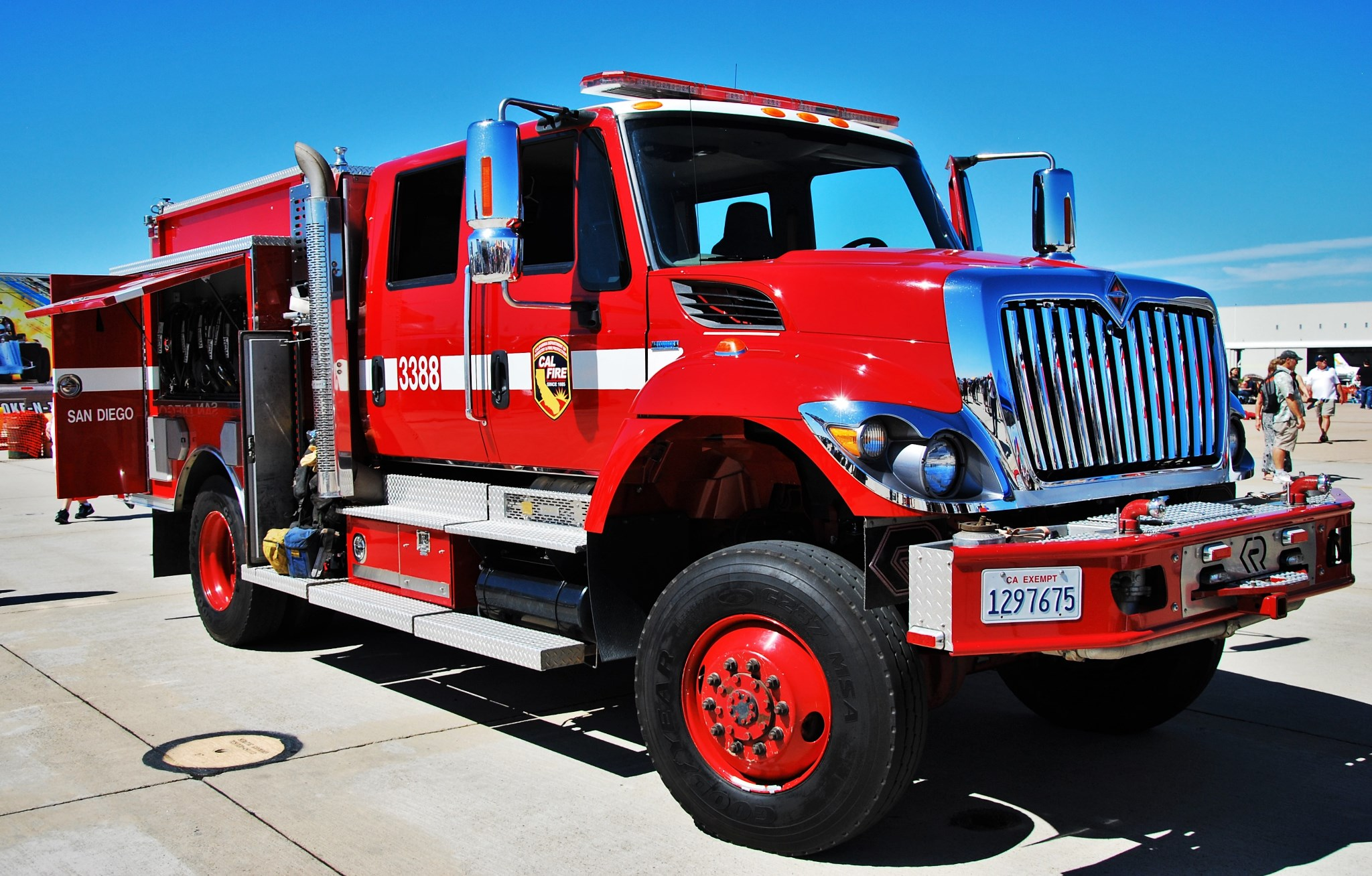
Wildland fire engine

== Characteristics ==
=== Color ===
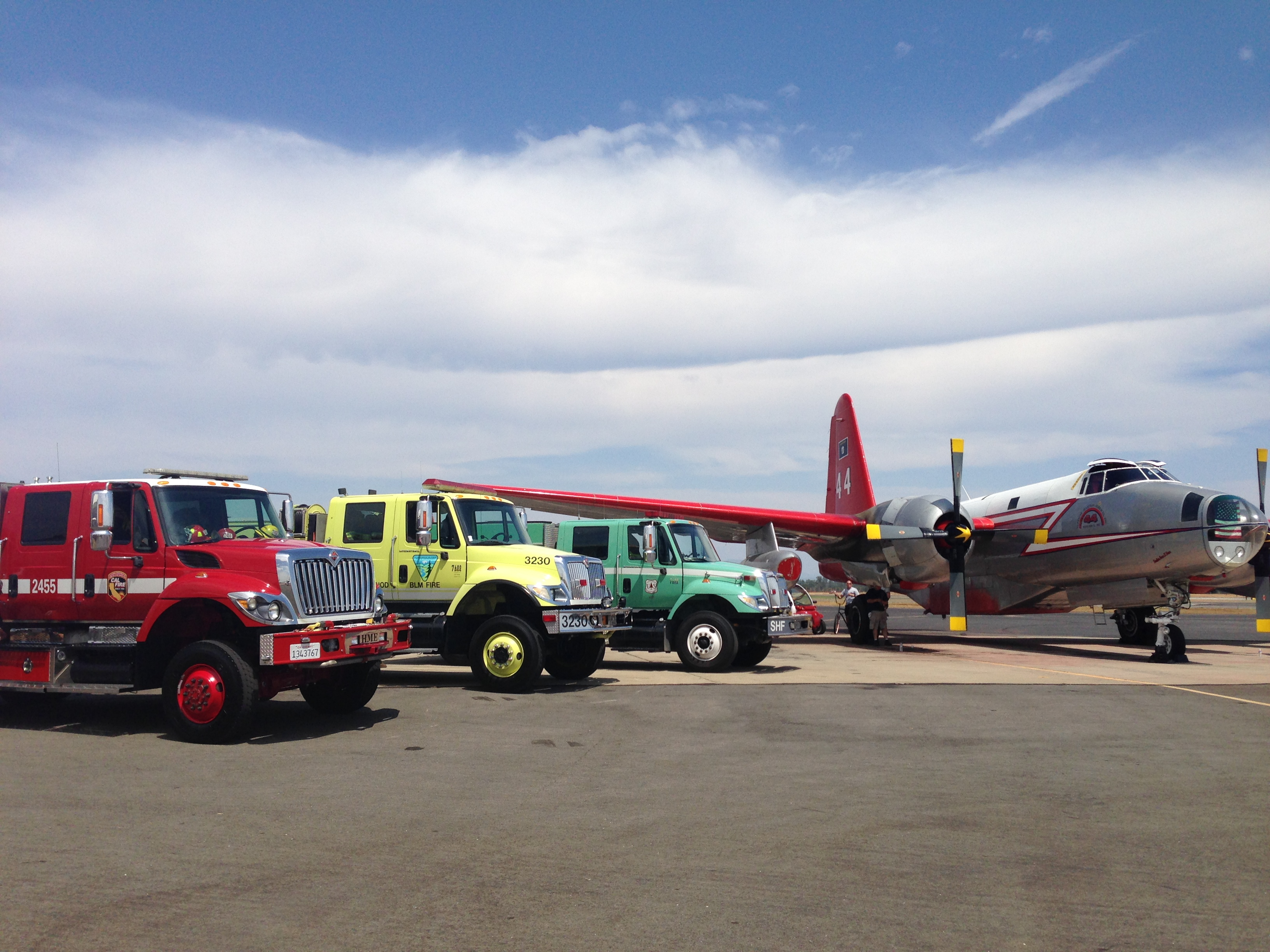
Wildland fire engines in three different colors alongside a Neptune Aviation plane. The red engine is used by CAL FIRE, the yellow engine is used by the Bureau of Land Management, and the green engine is used by the United States Forest Service.

Due to the need for firefighting apparatus to be highly visible, they are, similar to other emergency vehicles, painted in conspicuous colors, such as white, yellow, orange, or, most frequently and famously, fire engine red. While red remains the most common color for firefighting apparatus, it is not required and depends highly on individual needs, traditions, and safety research. For example, the Chicago Fire Department has a long-standing tradition of painting their apparatus black over red, a practice that has caught on far beyond Illinois. Neighboring departments will also often use different colors to distinguish their apparatus. For example, the Santa Barbara City Fire Department uses the traditional fire engine red while the neighboring Santa Barbara County Fire Department elects to use white with blue stripe. Some, like the Denver Fire Department use less common colors like all-over white with stripes, gold in Denver's case. Most fire apparatus use retroreflective markings to increase their visibility in poor light; red and white or red and yellow chevrons on the rear are almost universal, and while most choose a more modest and arguably stylish option in simply making existing stripe patters reflective, some, particularly European fire services and especially those in the United Kingdom and in the Netherlands, choose to have very large and prominent markings. Others still, such as the Munich Fire Department have replaced red with similar but more visible colors, such as fluorescent orange.

A study by the American Psychological Association published in February 2014 indicated that lime-yellow is a significantly safer color for emergency vehicles because of its increased visibility. The study showed that lime-yellow fire apparatus were half as likely to be involved in accidents as red vehicles.

=== Audible and visual warnings ===
Active visual warnings of a North American-type fire appliance

Passive visual warnings involve the use of high contrast patterns to increase the visibility of the vehicle. These types of warnings are often seen on older vehicles and those in developing countries. More modern designs make use of retroreflectors to reflect light from other vehicles. Vehicles will also often have these reflectors arranged in a chevron pattern along with the words fire or rescue. European countries commonly use a pattern known as Battenburg markings.

In addition to the passive warnings, there are active visual warnings which are usually in the form of flashing colored lights (also known as "beacons" or "lightbars"). These flash to attract the attention of other road users as the fire appliance approaches, or to provide warning to motorists approaching a stopped appliance in a dangerous position on the road. Additionally the lights use sirens. sound as an accompaniment.

Wail, Yelp and Phaser electronic tones from a Whelen(R) siren unit

Most appliances are also fitted with audible warnings, sometimes known as sirens, which can alert people to the presence of an emergency vehicle before they can be seen. The first audible warnings were mechanical bells, mounted on the front or roof of the truck. Most vehicles are now fitted with electronic sirens, which can produce a range of different sounds. Fire service driving training often includes the use of different sounds depending on traffic conditions and maneuver being performed. For instance, on a clear road, approaching a junction, the "wail" setting may be used, which gives a long up and down variation, with an unbroken tone, whereas, in heavy slow road traffic, a "yelp" setting may be preferred, which is like a wail, but faster.

A fire truck using an air horn while responding

The speakers for modern sirens can be located in several places on the vehicle, including being integral to the lightbar, or hidden in the grille. Some vehicles may also be fitted with airhorn audible warnings. The "acoustic" or "air" traditional sirens are still in wide use, most notably on North American-type fire apparatus but other countries such as Japan have fitted their apparatus with these types of warning systems as well, as its overtones help the public "locate" and avoid the fire truck—the newer electronic signals disperse almost pure electronic sine wave tones, which are hard to locate, especially in city "canyons" of buildings. Furthermore, "air" sirens are generally much, much louder. In Chile, many vehicles are fitted with three types of audible warnings, which are sounded all at once: the classic "air" siren, the electronic "yelp", and the European two-tone air horns (sometimes newer vehicles are fitted with the electronic version of the latter, commonly called "Hi-Lo").

A development is the use of the RDS system of car radios, whereby the vehicle can be fitted with a short range FM transmitter, set to RDS code 31, which interrupts the radio of all cars within range, in the manner of a traffic broadcast, but in such a way that the user of the receiving radio is unable to opt out of the message (as with traffic broadcasts). This feature is built into all RDS radios for use in national emergency broadcast systems, but short range units on emergency vehicles can prove an effective means of alerting traffic to their presence, although is not able to alert pedestrians and non-RDS radio users.

== See also ==
- Birdsill Holly
