= Alameda County Fire Department =

Coordinates: 37.65°N 121.91°W

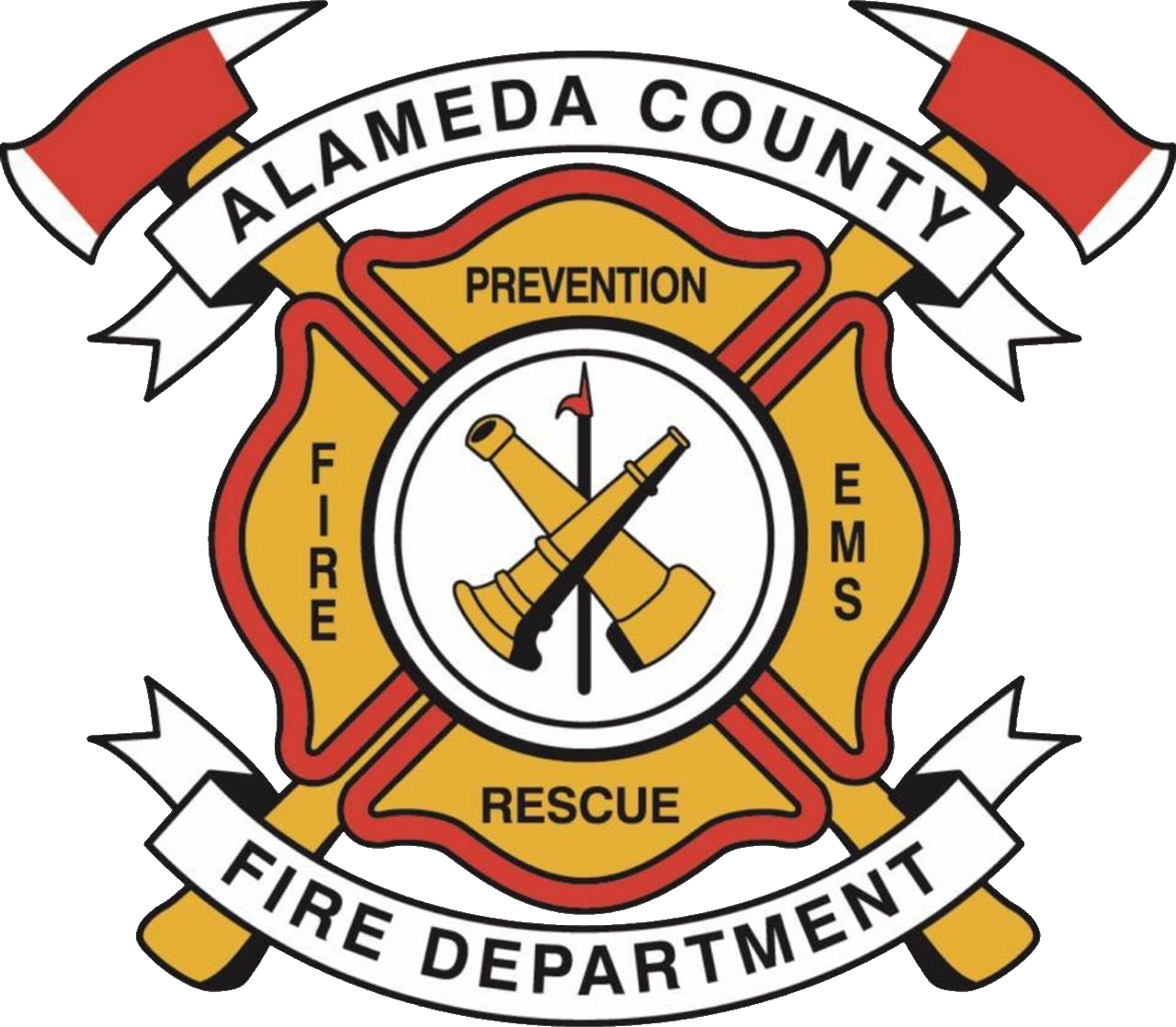

Operational area
- Country: United States
- State: California
- County: Alameda

Agency overview
- Established: July 1, 1993
- Annual calls: 41683(2017)
- Employees: 400 Staff, 100 Reserve personnel
- Annual budget: $140,490,812 (2018)
- Fire chief: William McDonald
- EMS level: ALS
- IAFF: 55

Facilities and equipment
- Battalions: 4
- Stations: 28
- Engines: 26
- Trucks: 4
- Quints: 3
- Rescues: 1
- Ambulances: 2
- Tenders: 2
- HAZMAT: 4
- Bulldozers: 2

Website
- Official website
- IAFF website

The Alameda County Fire Department (ACFD) provides all-risk emergency services to the unincorporated areas of Alameda County, California (excluding Fairview), the cities of San Leandro, Dublin, Newark, Union City and Emeryville, the Lawrence Berkeley National Laboratory and the Lawrence Livermore National Laboratory. With 28 fire stations and 35 companies serving a population of 394,000, the ACFD serves densely populated urban areas, waterways, industrialized centers, extensive urban interface, agricultural and wildland regions. Over 400 personnel and 100 reserve firefighters provide a wide variety of services to a community roughly 508 square miles (1,320 km^{2}) in size.

These services include:

- Advanced Life Support Emergency Medical Services Response
- Fire Suppression Response
- Hazardous Materials Response
- Urban Search & Rescue Response
- Water Rescue Response
- Community Outreach & Education efforts
- Disaster Preparedness
- Fire Prevention and Code Compliance efforts
- Regional Dispatch

== USAR Task Force 4 ==
The Alameda County Fire Department has multiple members that participate in California USAR Task Force 4 (CA-TF4.) CA-TF4 is one of eight FEMA Urban Search and Rescue Task Forces in the State of California and 28 nationally. CA-TF4 is based in Oakland and is sponsored by the Oakland Fire Department.

== Stations & Equipment ==
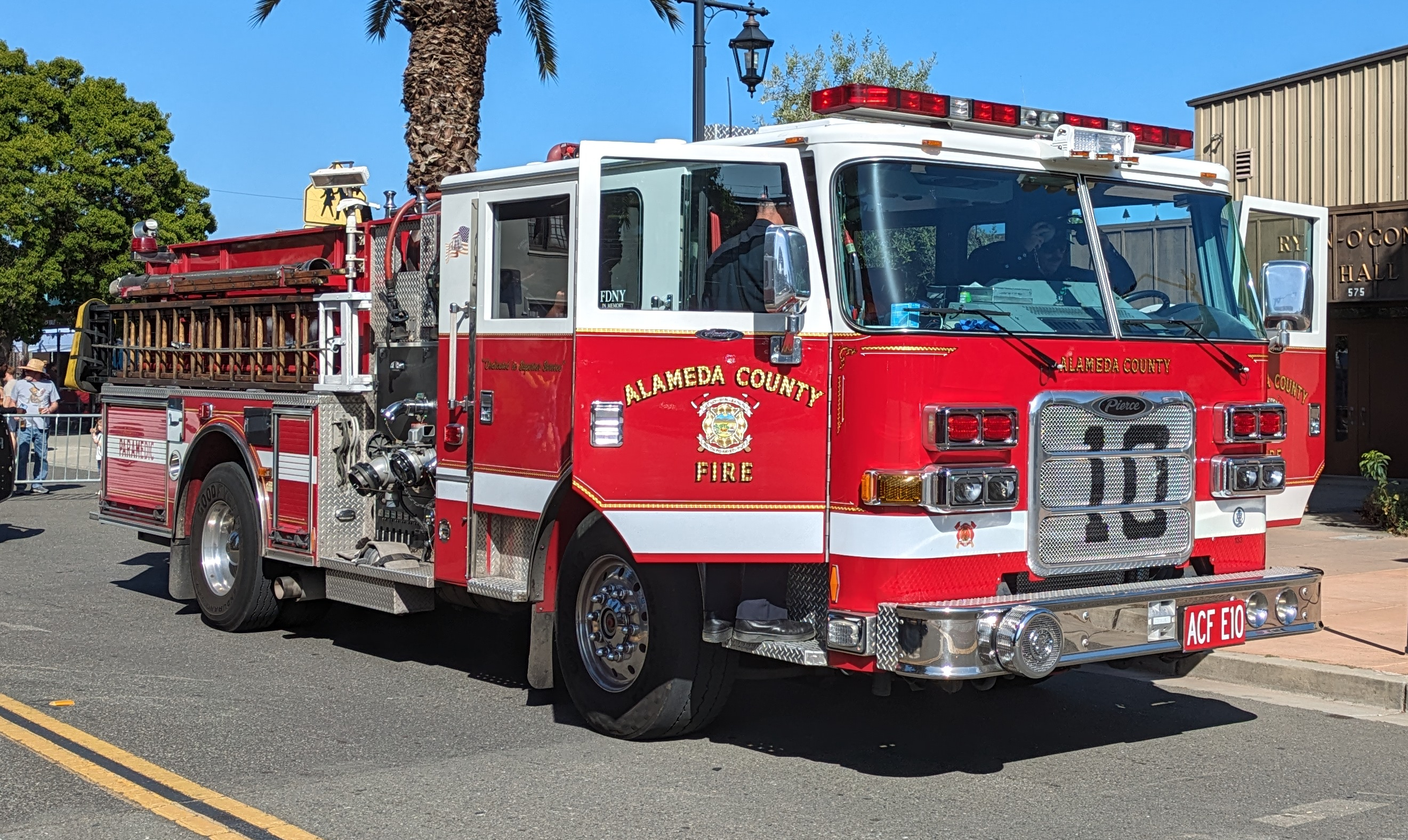
Engine 10 in San Leandro

The Alameda County Fire Department utilizes a wide variety of firefighting and specialized apparatus, including Engines, Trucks, Quints, Wildland Engines (Type 3 or Type 6,) Dozers and Water Tenders. Special Operations Vehicles include Rescue Boats, HazMat Units and a Rescue Unit. The Department has four Battalions. Stations 6, 7, 22, 23, 24, 25 and 26 are in Battalion 2. Stations 14, 16, 17, 18, 20 and 21 are in Battalion 3. Stations 9, 10, 11, 12, 13, 19, 34 and 35 are in Battalion 4. Stations 27, 28, 29, 31, 32 and 33 are in Battalion 7.

Battalion 2
Fire Station Number	City	Address	Engine Company	Truck Company	Wildland Engine Company	Command Unit	Special Operations Units	Other Units
6	Castro Valley	19780 Cull Canyon Road	Engine 6		Engine 606			Reserve Engine 506 Reserve Water Tender 6
7	Castro Valley	6901 Villareal Avenue	Engine 7		Engine 607			
22	San Lorenzo	427 Paseo Grande	Engine 22					
23	Hayward	19745 Meekland Avenue	Engine 23		Engine 323			
24	San Leandro	1430 164th Avenue	Engine 24				Rescue 24 Heavy Rescue 524	
25	Castro Valley	20336 San Miguel Avenue	Engine 25	Truck 25	OES Engine 8233 Engine 625	Battalion Chief 2	HazMat 25	Reserve Truck 525 Reserve Engine 525
26	Castro Valley	18770 Lake Chabot Road	Engine 26		Engine 626			

Battalion 3
Fire Station Number	City	Address	Engine Company	Truck Company	Wildland Engine Company	Command Unit	Special operations Units	Other Units
14	Sunol	11345 Pleasanton-Sunol Road	Engine 14		Engine 614 CDF Engine 1664 CDF Engine 1684	CDF Battalion Chief 1614		CDF Dozer 1644
16	Dublin	7494 Donohue Drive	Engine 16		Engine 616			Water Tender 16 Reserve Engine 516
17	Dublin	6200 Madigan Road	Engine 17	Truck 17	Engine 317			Dozer 17
18	Dublin	4800 Fallon Road	Engine 18		Engine 318			Dozer 18 Breathing Support 18
20	Livermore	7000 East Avenue	Engine 20 Engine 8	Truck 20	Engine 320 Engine 308 Engine 620	Battalion Chief 3	HazMat 20 Rescue Boat 8 REMS Unit 8	Medic 20 Medic 520 Reserve Engine 520
21	Tracy	15999 W. Corral Hollow Road	Engine 21		Engine 321 Engine 621			Medic 21

Battalion 4
Fire Station Number	City	Address	Engine Company	Truck Company	Wildland Engine Company	Command Unit	Special Operations Unit	Other Units
9	San Leandro	450 Estudillo Avenue	Engine 9	Truck 9				
10	San Leandro	2194 Williams Street	Engine 10				Rescue Boat 10	
11	San Leandro	14903 Catalina Street	Engine 11				Rescue Boat 11	
12	San Leandro	1065 143rd Avenue	Engine 12	Truck 12		Battalion Chief 4	HazMat 12	
13	San Leandro	637 Fargo Avenue	Engine 13					
19	Berkeley	1 Cyclotron Road	Engine 19		Engine 619		HazMat 19	
34	Emeryville	2333 Powell Street	Engine 34					Rescue Boat 34
35	Emeryville	6303 Hollis Street	Engine 35				Reserve Truck 35	

Battalion 7
Fire Station Number	City	Address	Engine Company	Truck (Quint) Company	Wildland Engine Company	Command Unit	Other Units
27	Newark	39039 Cherry Street	Engine 27				Reserve Engine 527
28	Newark	7550 Thornton Avenue		Truck 28 (Quint)			
29	Newark	35775 Ruschin Drive	Engine 29				Reserve Engine 529
31	Union City	33555 Central Avenue		Truck 31 (Quint)			Reserve Truck 531
32	Union City	31600 Alvarado Blvd	Engine 32				Reserve Engine 532
33	Union City	33942 7th Street	Engine 33		Engine 333	Battalion Chief 7	

== See also ==
- Alameda County
