= Urban Search and Rescue California Task Force 4 =

Urban Search and Rescue California Task Force 4 or CA-TF4 is a FEMA Urban Search and Rescue Task Force based in Oakland, California. CA-TF4 is sponsored by the Oakland Fire Department.

CA-TF4 is composed of individuals from a number of different agencies. The agencies are the Alameda City Fire Department, Alameda County Fire Department, Hayward Fire Department, American Medical Response, Berkeley Fire Department, Camp Parks Fire Department, City of Dublin Fire Department, Fremont Fire Department, Contra Costa County Fire Protection District, Livermore-Pleasanton Fire Department, Marin County Fire Department, Novato Fire Department, Oakland Fire Department, San Ramon Valley Fire Protection District, Santa Rosa Fire Department and the Stockton Fire Department.

== Deployments ==
- September 11, 2001 attacks - Deployed to World Trade Center, New York City, New York
- Hurricane Katrina
- Hurricane Rita - Gulf Region
