= ACFD =

ACFD may refer to:

- Arlington County Fire Department, the fire department for Arlington County, Virginia
- Alameda County Fire Department, the fire department for Alameda County, California
