= Riverside Fire Department =

Coordinates: 33.9813°N 117.3707°W

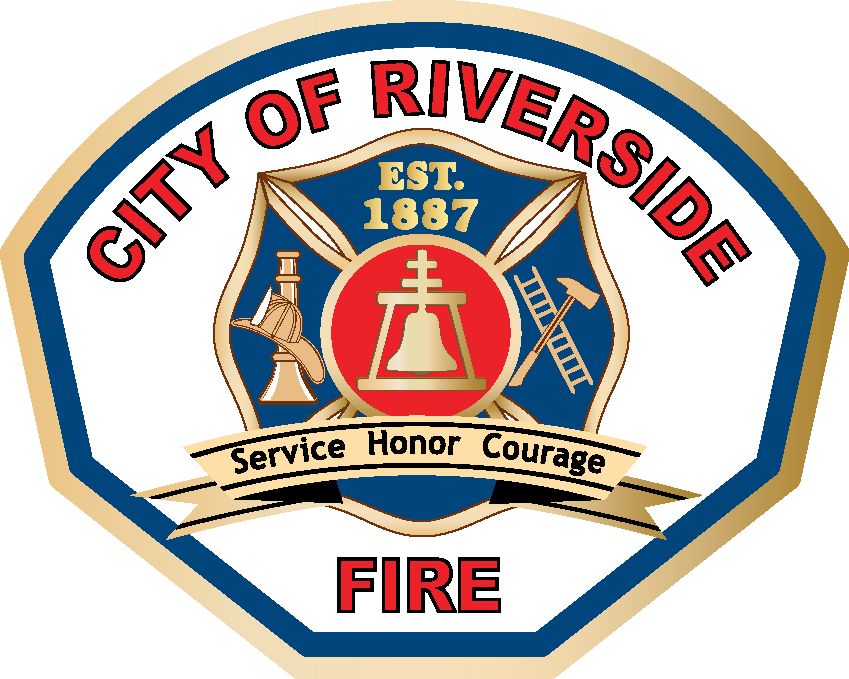

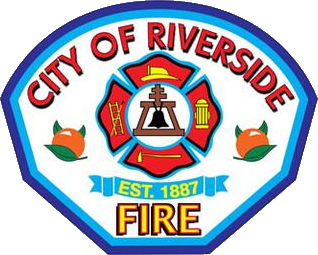

Operational area
- Country: United States
- State: California
- City: Riverside

Agency overview
- Established: October 7, 1887
- Annual budget: $52,088,055 (2014)
- Fire chief: Steve McKinster
- IAFF: 1067

Facilities and equipment
- Battalions: 2
- Stations: 14
- Engines: 13 - first-run 8 - reserve
- Trucks: 4
- Squads: 3
- Rescues: 1
- Tenders: 1
- HAZMAT: 1
- Wildland: 4 - Type 3; 1 - Type 6

Website
- Official website
- IAFF website

The Riverside Fire Department is the agency that provides fire protection and emergency medical services for the city of Riverside, California. As of 2015 the department is responsible for servicing a population of 314,034 in an area of 81.51 square miles (211.1 km^{2}).

== History ==
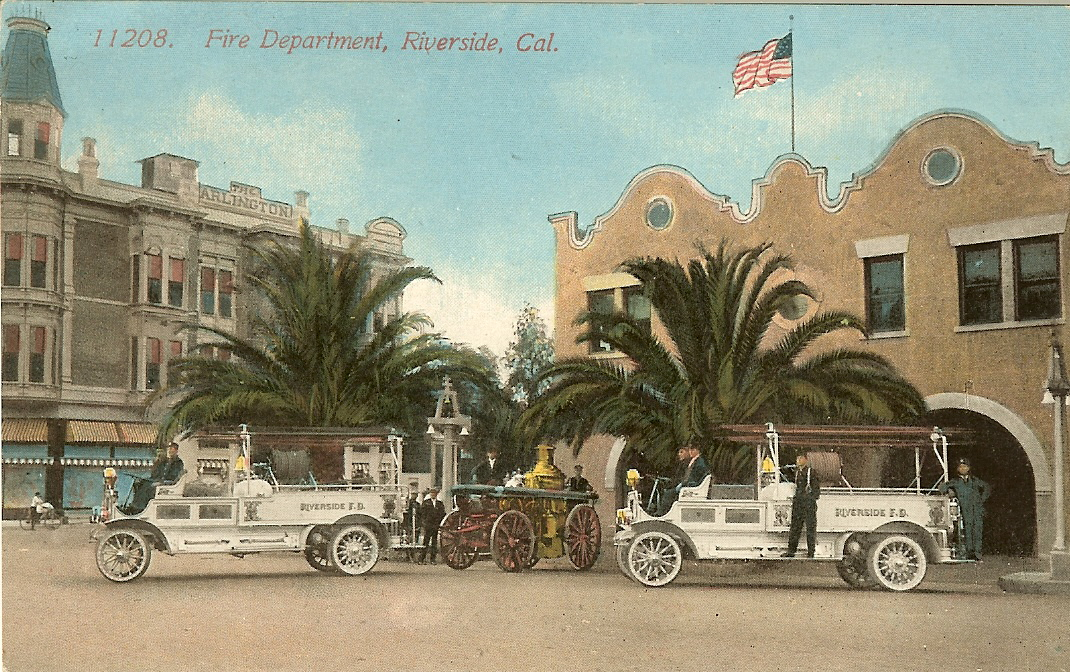
Fire Station #1, circa 1910, at the corner of 8th and Lime Streets (8th Street is now University Avenue)

The City of Riverside Fire Department can trace its origin back to 1875 from a newspaper article referencing the response of a hose cart to a fire in the township of Riverside. An unorganized group of volunteers existed in the Riverside township from December 1871 to April 1882. In April 1882, Frank Miller, the owner of the Mission Inn, convinced local businessmen to contribute towards a wagon and fire buckets, costing $500. Subsequently, William Hayt, a businessman and owner of several stage lines, began a drive to establish a complete fire department. Hayt got the city's Board of Trustees agreement to establish the Riverside Fire Department, but only after Hayt offered to raise half the money from local businessmen, and to put up the other half of the funds himself, to be reimbursed later. Hayt was able to raise $527, he loaned the city an additional $516, and the Riverside Fire Department was officially established on October 7, 1887.

The first major fire to confront the new fire department was on April 21, 1888, when the Pavilion, a large wood-frame structure used for many social occasions such as theaters, dances, and general meeting space, burned to the ground. Nearly two decades later, in February 1906, the first station was built for the Riverside Fire Department at the corner of 8th and Lime Streets.

By 1938, the department had grown to 33 firefighters and five engine companies spread out across four stations. Starting in 1998, the department transitioned to the Advanced Life Support (ALS) level of support.

=== USAR Task Force 6 ===
The RFD is the sponsoring agency of California Task Force 6 (CA-TF6), one of the eight FEMA Urban Search and Rescue Task Forces spread out across the state. The task force responds to emergencies and disasters. Some of their most notable responses include the Northridge earthquake (1994), the Oklahoma City bombing (1995) and Hurricane Katrina (2005).

== Stations and apparatus ==
The RFD has 14 stations in the city.

Fire Station Number	Neighborhood	Engine Company	Truck Company	Squad Company	Reserve Engine or Squad	Wildland Unit	Command Unit	Specialized units
1	Downtown	Engine 1	Truck 1	Squad 1		Brush 1	Battalion 1, Battalion 831	UT-1, ATV 1, AMR 301
2	Arlington	Engine 2	Truck 2	Squad 2			Battalion 2	HazMat 2, Support 2 & UT-2
3	Magnolia Center	Engine 3	Truck 3					Heavy Rescue 3, Water Rescue 3, UT-3, ATV 3, HART
4	University	Engine 4				Water Tender 4		
5	Airport	Engine 5	Water Tender 5	RA-5	Squad 835, Foam Tender 5			Breathing Support 5
6	Northside	Engine 6			Engine 836		Decon 6	
7	Arlanza	Engine 7	Engine 831			OES 6314		UT-7
8	La Sierra	Engine 8			Engine 369			UT-8
9	Mission Grove	Engine 9			Engine 839			
10	Arlington Heights	Engine 10			Engine 840	Truck 841		
11	Orange Crest	Engine 11			Engine 841		OES 369	
12	La Sierra South	Engine 12				Brush 12		SUPPORT12
13	Sycamore Canyon		Truck 13			Patrol 13		UT-13
14	Canyon Crest	Engine 14	Engine 832	Engine 842		Engine 8635		UT-14, Ladder Trailer, Quad 14A & Quad 14B

== Chiefs ==
LaWayne Hearn (2022–present)

Michael Moore (2014–2022)

Michael Esparza (2013 - 2014)

Steven H. Earley (2009 - 2013)

Tedd Laycock (2005 - 2009)

Dave Carlson (1996 - 2005)

Michael Vonada (1993 - 1996)

Douglas Greene (1986 - 1992)

Richard Bosted (1977 - 1986)

Fred Woodard (1973 - 1977)

Burney Montgomery (1959 - 1973)

Ray Allen (1942 - 1959)

William Taylor (1938 - 1942)

Ed Mosbaugh (1931 - 1938)

Jack Hutchinson (1929 - 1931)

John Bayha (1928 - 1929)

Jack Hutchinson (1926 - 1928)

Joseph Schneider (1901 - 1926)

S.L. Wight (1897 - 1901)

W.G. Polcene (1897 - 1897)

S.R. Smith (1896 - 1897)

G.F. Ward (1890 - 1896)

J.N. Keith (1887 - 1890)
