= Santa Barbara City Fire Department =

Municipal fire department serving the city of Santa Barbara

Coordinates: 34°25′33″N 119°42′51″W

City of Santa Barbara Fire Department
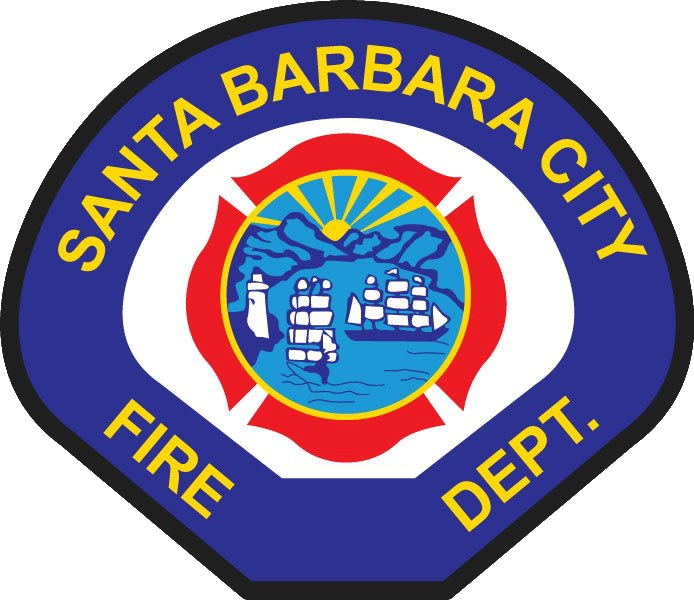

Operational area
- Country: United States
- State: California
- City: Santa Barbara

Agency overview
- Established: 1881
- Annual calls: 8,027 (2012)
- Employees: 110
- Annual budget: $21,393,661
- Staffing: Career
- Fire chief: Christopher P. Mailes
- EMS level: BLS
- IAFF: 525

Facilities and equipment
- Battalions: 1
- Stations: 8
- Engines: 7 frontline 4 reserve
- Trucks: 2
- Squads: 1
- Rescues: 2
- HAZMAT: 1
- Airport crash: 2
- Wildland: 2 - Type 3; 1 - Type 6

Website
- Official website
- IAFF website

The City of Santa Barbara Fire Department (SBFD), also known as the Santa Barbara City Fire Department, is the fire department of the city of Santa Barbara, California, United States. It provides fire protection and basic life support (BLS) emergency medical services for the city of Santa Barbara. The Santa Barbara County Fire Department serves county residents.

== Equipment ==
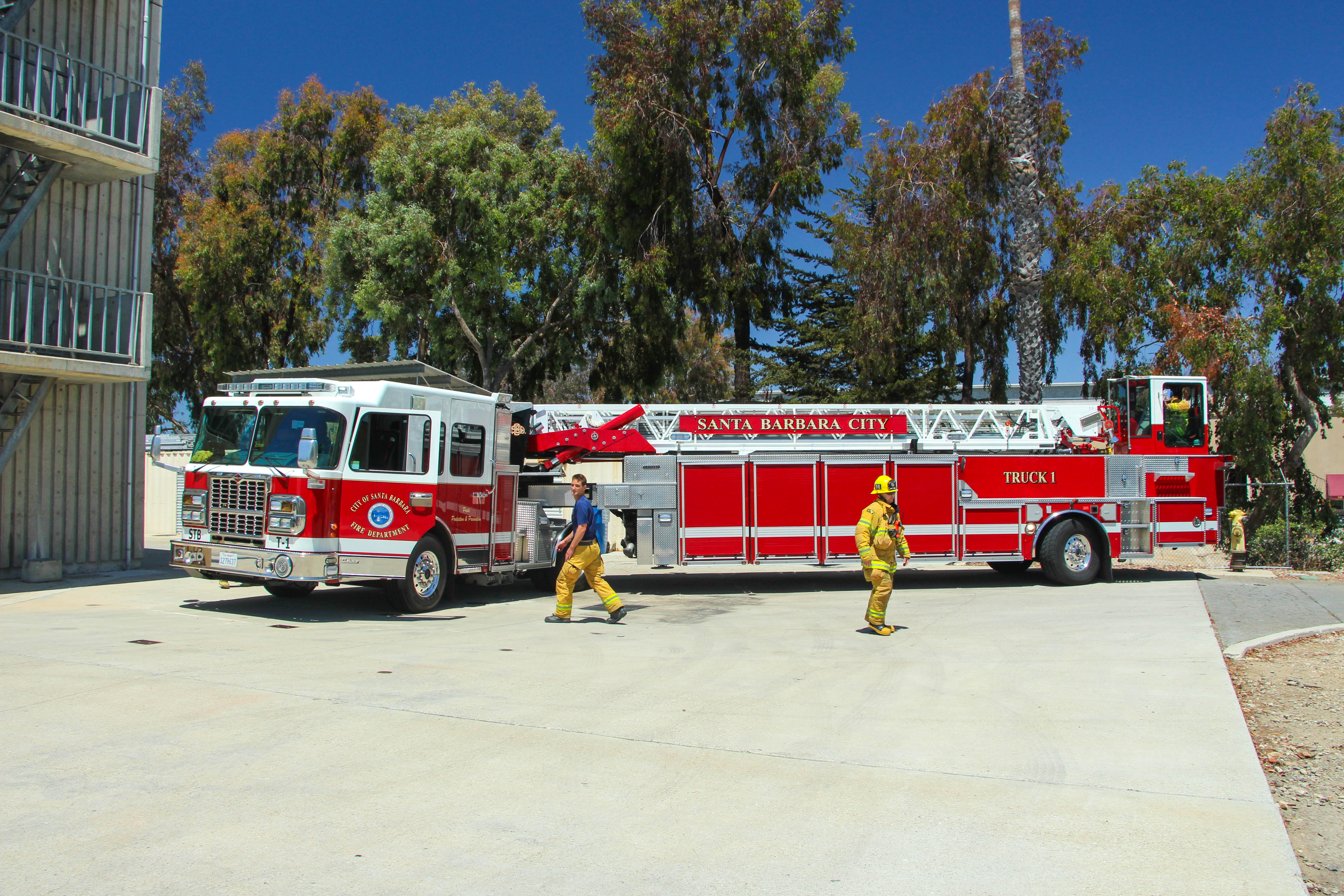
Truck 1 during a drill at the training tower.

=== Type 1 Engine ===
Santa Barbara has a total of 11 pumper engines with 7 acting as frontline engines and an additional 4 in reserve. These engines are staffed by 3 personnel: a captain, an engineer and a firefighter. Each engine is fitted with a 1500 GPM pump and carries 750 gallons of water.

=== Type 3 Engine ===
The Type 3 Engines, which are used mainly for vegetation fires, are smaller than the Type 1s which are used primarily in the city. It can pump water while the vehicle is being driven, unlike the Type 1 engine. Each of the engines feature a 500-gallon water tank and a 20-gallon tank for Class A foam. In September 2013, the SBFD bought a second $400,000 Type 3 Engine and placed it at station 7, moving the older Type 3 to station 4.

=== Special Response Unit ===
The Special Response Unit is a box van that contains supplies for a Mass Casualty Incident (MCI). It is dispatched automatically to any reported aircraft emergency on or off the airport property, as well as by request of any incident IC.

=== Heavy Rescue ===
In March 2006, the SBFD acquired a $450,000 Heavy Rescue unit built by SVI Trucks. At over 33 feet long, the Heavy Rescue weighs 44,000 pounds fully loaded. The interior has seating for six people as well as storage for all the tools necessary. The vehicle also has foldout awnings on both sides.

=== Airport Foam Engines ===
Station 8, located at the Santa Barbara Municipal Airport, which was previously under the jurisdiction of Santa Barbara County Fire and was later annexed into the City of Santa Barbara, is home to 3 Oshkosh Striker vehicles. Responding to approximately 65 calls per year, each of these engines is fitted with a 1500 GPM pump, carry 1500 gallons water, 210 gallons of foam concentrate, and 450 pounds of dry chemical or Halotron.

== Stations and apparatus ==
Fire Station Number	Address	Engine Company or Reserve Engine Company	Truck Company or Auxiliary Truck Company	Rescue Units	Other units
1	121 W. Carrillo St.	Engine 1 Reserve Engine 1	Truck 1 Auxiliary Truck 1	Rescue 1	Heavy Rescue Squad 1, Battalion Chief
2	819 Cacique St.	Engine 2			HazMat 2
3	415 E. Sola St.	Engine 3 Reserve Engine 3			
4	19 N. Ontare Rd.	Engine 4 Reserve Engine 4			Brush Engine 304
5	2505 Modoc Rd.	Engine 5			Special Response Unit
6	1802 Cliff Dr.	Engine 6 Reserve Engine 6			
7	2411 Stanwood Dr.	Engine 7			Brush Engine 307, Patrol 7
8	Santa Barbara Airport			Rescue 8	Foam 81, Foam 82, MCI 8

== See also ==
- Santa Barbara County Fire Department
