= Oakland Fire Department =

Fire department in the United States

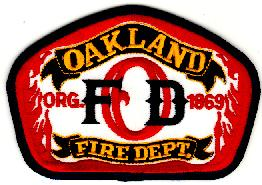

Operational area
- Country: United States
- State: California
- City: Oakland

Agency overview
- Established: March 13, 1869
- Annual calls: 62,729 (2011)
- Employees: ~420
- Staffing: Career
- EMS level: ALS
- IAFF: 55

Facilities and equipment
- Battalions: 3
- Stations: 26
- Engines: 25
- Trucks: 7
- Rescues: 1
- HAZMAT: 2
- USAR: 1
- Airport crash: 6
- Wildland: 8

Website
- Official website
- IAFF website

The Oakland Fire Department (OFD) provides fire protection and emergency medical services to the city of Oakland, California. The department is responsible for 78 square miles (200 km^{2}) with a population of 406,253.

== History ==
The Oakland Fire Department was initially started in the 1860s as a volunteer fire department and was officially formed on March 13, 1869, when its first fire station was built. In 1908 the department bought their first motorized fire engine and in the 1920s, the department became one of the first in the nation to hire African American firefighters.

In 1991, the OFD was faced with a major conflagration that killed 25 people and injured 150 others. The Oakland firestorm of 1991 burned 1,520 acres (6.2 km^{2}) in the Berkeley and Oakland Hills, destroying 3,354 single-family dwellings and 437 apartment and condominium units. The economic loss was estimated at $1.5 billion.

== USAR Task Force 4 ==
The Oakland Fire Department is the sponsoring agency of Urban Search and Rescue California Task Force 4 (CA-TF4), one of eight FEMA Urban Search and Rescue Task Forces in the state of California and 28 nationally. The task forces, which is made up of personnel from 15 different agencies in the Bay Area, provides resources to locate, extricate, and provide immediate medical treatment to victims trapped in collapsed structures as well as other life saving operations.

== Stations and apparatus ==
Below is a complete listing of all OFD Fire Station and Fire Company locations according to Division and Battalion.

Fire Station	Address	Engine Company	Truck Company	Patrol Unit	Wildland Unit	Special Unit	Division	Battalion
1	1603 MLK Jr. Way	Engine 1	Truck 1			Rescue 1	2	2
2	47 Clay St	Engine 2				Marine 1, Marine 2, Marine 3, Utility 93	2	
3	1445 14th St	Engine 3	Truck 3			Fire Investigator 1, HazMat 1, HazMat 2, Foam 1	2	
4	1235 International Blvd	Engine 4	Truck 2				4	
5	934 34th St	Engine 5					2	
6	7080 Colton Blvd	Engine 6			Wildland Unit 306		4	
7	1006 Amito Dr	Engine 7			Wildland Unit 307		2	
8	463 51st St	Engine 8	Truck 5				4	
10	172 Santa Clara Ave	Engine 10					2	
12	822 Alice St	Engine 12						
13	1225 Derby Ave	Engine 13					4	
15	455 27th St	Engine 15	Truck 4				2	
16	3600 13th Ave	Engine 16					4	
17	3344 High St	Engine 17					4	4
18	1700 50th Ave	Engine 18	Truck 6				3	
19	5766 Miles Ave	Engine 19				Air 1	4	
20	1401 98th Ave	Engine 20	Truck 7				3	3
21	13150 Skyline Blvd	Engine 21		Patrol Unit 21			3	
22	Oakland Airport					ARFF Crash 1, ARFF Crash 2, ARFF Crash 3, ARFF Crash 5, ARFF Crash 6, ARFF Crash 17, ARFF Crash 18		
23	7100 Foothill Blvd	Engine 23			Wildland Unit 323		3	
24	5900 Shepherd Canyon Rd	Engine 24			Wildland Unit 324		4	
25	2795 Butters Dr	Engine 25			Wildland Unit 325		4	
26	2611 98th Ave	Engine 26		Patrol Unit 26		OES 8232	3	
27	8501 Pardee Dr	Engine 27				Foam 2	3	
28	4615 Grass Valley Rd	Engine 28		Patrol Unit 28			3	
29	1016 66th Ave	Engine 29					3	

== Rank structure ==
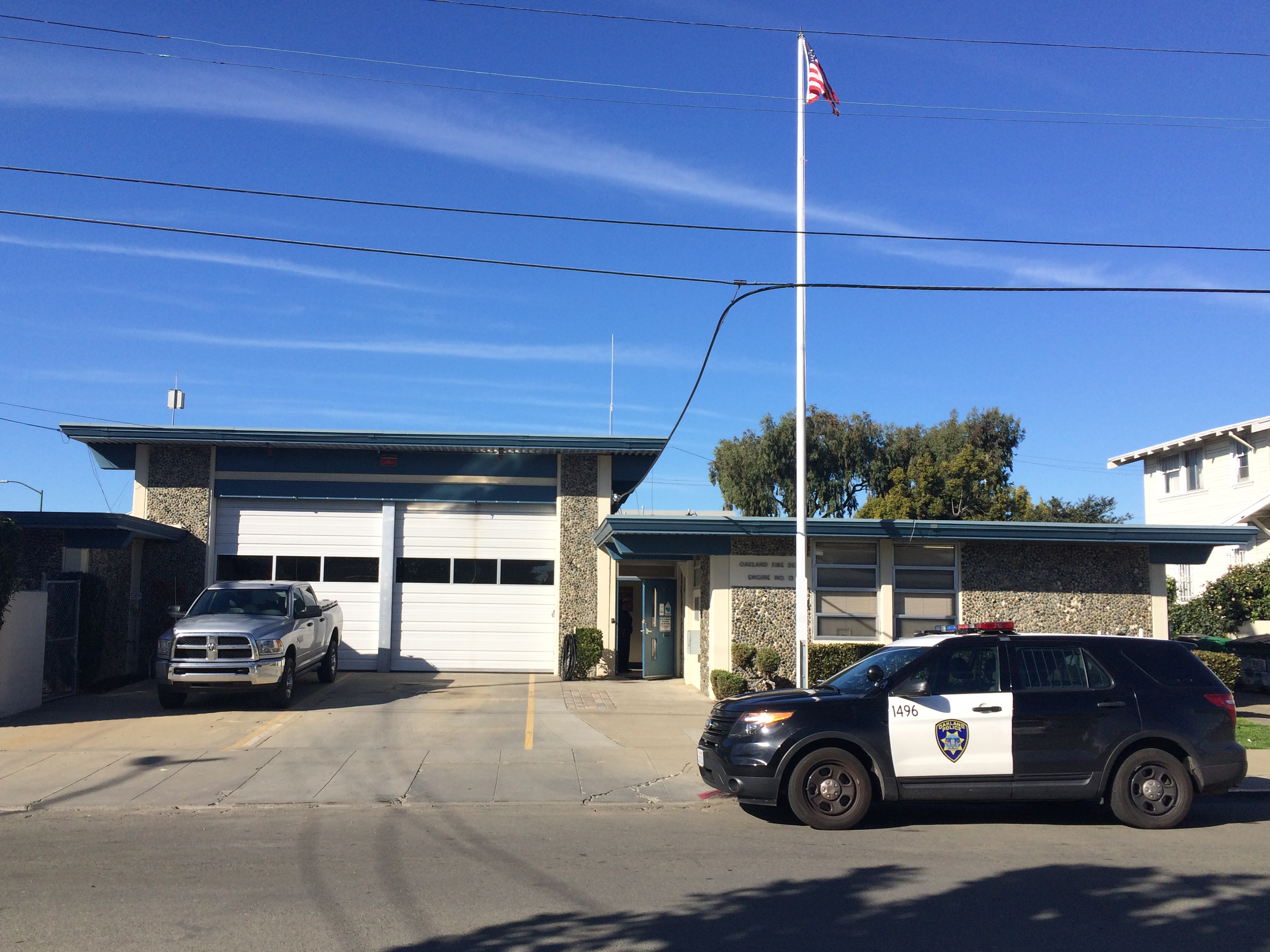
Fire Station 13, 2016

1. Firefighter/Paramedic
2. Engineer
3. Lieutenant
4. Captain
5. Battalion Chief
6. Assistant Chief
7. Deputy Chief
8. Fire Chief
