= Hazardous materials apparatus =

Emergency vehicle for hazardous materials

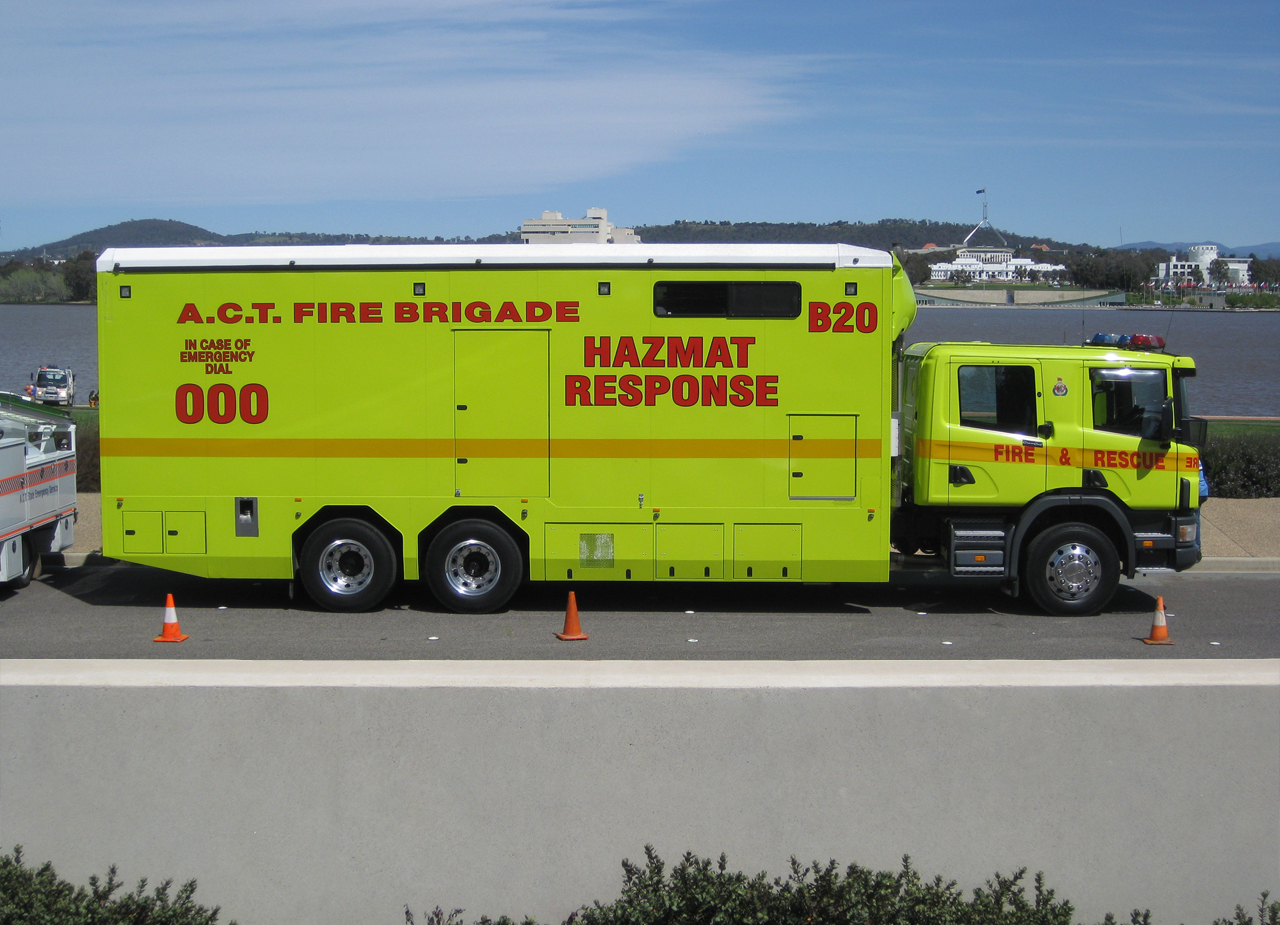
Hazmat response unit with the ACT Fire & Rescue Service in Canberra.

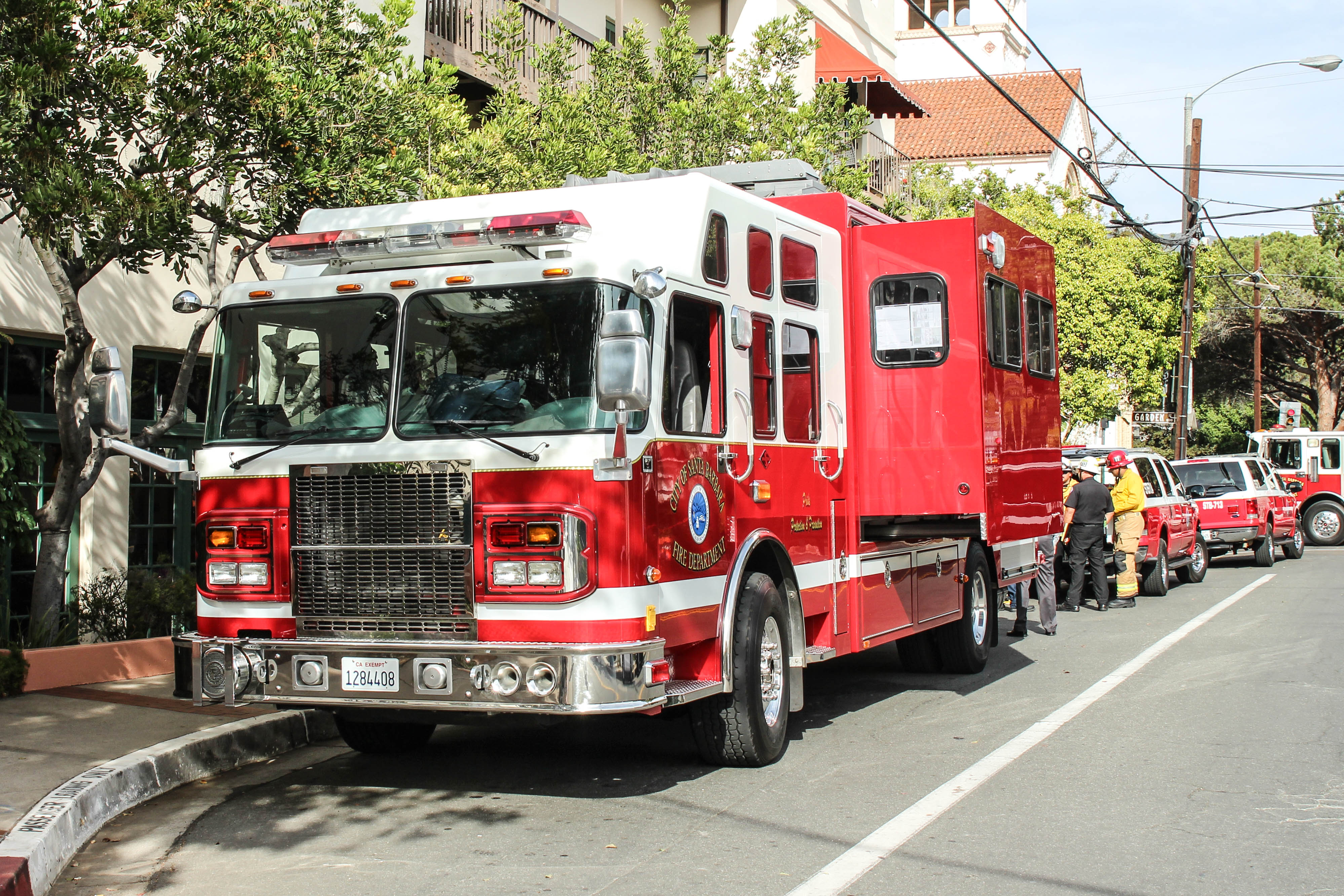
The Santa Barbara City Fire Department Hazmat vehicle staged at an incident.

A hazardous material (hazmat) apparatus is a vehicle used by emergency services to respond to calls involving potentially hazardous materials. These vehicles are customized to fit the needs of the agency responsible for the apparatus, which may be a rescue squad, fire department, emergency medical services, law enforcement agency, or military.

A typical hazmat vehicle will have a portion dedicated to a command and communications center often fitted with computers, televisions, two-way radios and other equipment. This command center is usually located in a portion of the vehicle that slides out or expands much like is found on a typical recreational vehicle.

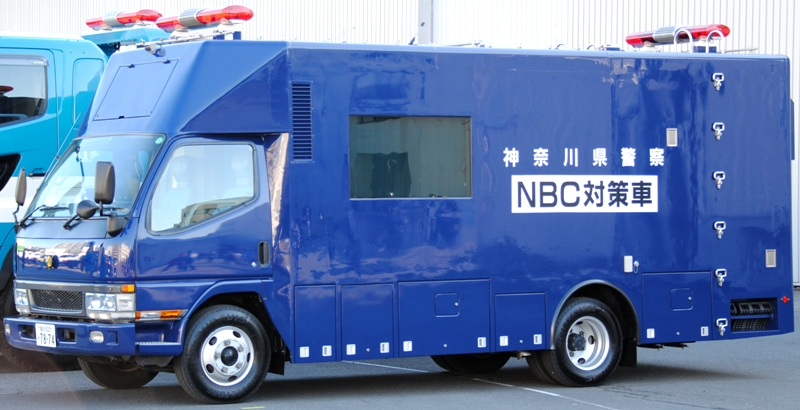
Hazmat apparatus of the Kanagawa Prefectural Police Department

Hazmat vehicles also often come with a portable lab complete with sinks and fume hoods that allow for the analysis of samples collected at the scene.

In the United States, NFPA regulation 471 Recommended Practice For Responding To Hazardous Materials Incidents outlines the equipment required for a hazmat apparatus including a radiation detector, pH meter and other air sampling devices.

Some equipment found on hazmat vehicles include:

- Containment booms to contain spills of non-miscible materials
- Personal protective equipment such as self-contained breathing apparatus and hazmat suits

== See also ==
- Salvage drum
