= Wildland fire engine =

Fire engine designed for fighting wildfires

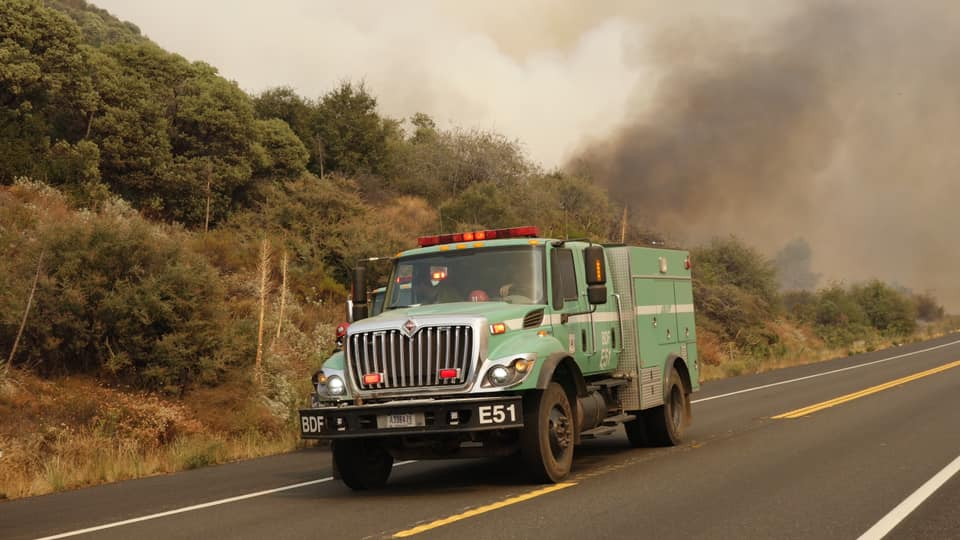
A United States Forest Service wildland fire engine during the 2020 El Dorado Fire in California

A wildland fire engine or brush truck is a fire engine specifically designed to assist in fighting wildfires by transporting firefighters to the scene and providing them with access to the fire, along with water or other equipment. There are multiple types of wildfire apparatus which are used in different scenarios.

== United States ==
According to the U.S. National Fire Protection Association, if the apparatus will be used primarily for outdoor and wildland responses, then it is to be considered a wildland fire apparatus and must conform to NFPA 1906.

Depending on where the engine is stationed, it may carry as much as twice the national standard in fire hose. In areas where there is rugged terrain that keeps engines from driving directly to the fire, large hose lays are installed to transport water to the fire area. In areas with moderate terrain less hose is used as it is easier to access the fire.

== Features ==
Wildland engines are traditionally smaller than standard fire engines and are primarily used for wildfires. They also respond to emergencies in the back country where traditional engines cannot respond. Most wildland engines feature four-wheel drive capability and can thus climb hills and make it through rough terrain. One of the features that makes these engines ideal for vegetation fires is that they can pump water while driving, whereas most, but not all traditional engines must be put into park to flow water, it depends on the specifications to which the Fire Department wants the vehicle to be built.

== Engine types ==
In the fall of 2007, the National Wildfire Coordinating Group agreed on a set of standards for fire engines used for wildland firefighting in the United States. As structure engines are sometimes used on wildland fires, though primarily for structure protection, they are also included in the NWCG engine typing. Per the standards there are 7 types of fire engines.

Minimum Standards by Type
	Engine Type						
	Structure		Wildland				
Requirements	1	2	3	4	5	6	7
Minimum tank capacity	300 US gal (1,100 L; 250 imp gal)	300 US gal (1,100 L; 250 imp gal)	500 US gal (1,900 L; 420 imp gal)	750 US gal (2,800 L; 620 imp gal)	400 US gal (1,500 L; 330 imp gal)	150 US gal (570 L; 120 imp gal)	50 US gal (190 L; 42 imp gal)
Minimum flow rate USGPM (L/S IMPGPM)	1,000 (63; 830)	500 (32; 420)	150 (9.5; 120)	50 (3.2; 42)	50 (3.2; 42)	50 (3.2; 42)	10 (0.63; 8.3)
Minimum pressure	150 psi (1,000 kPa)	150 psi (1,000 kPa)	250 psi (1,700 kPa)	100 psi (690 kPa)	100 psi (690 kPa)	100 psi (690 kPa)	100 psi (690 kPa)
Hose types							
2-1/2"	1,200 ft (370 m)	1,000 ft (300 m)	—N/a	—N/a	—N/a	—N/a	—N/a
1-1/2"	500 ft (150 m)	500 ft (150 m)	1,000 ft (300 m)	300 ft (91 m)	300 ft (91 m)	300 ft (91 m)	—N/a
1"	—N/a	—N/a	500 ft (150 m)	300 ft (91 m)	300 ft (91 m)	300 ft (91 m)	200 ft (61 m)
Pump and Roll	Sometimes	Sometimes	Yes	Yes	Yes	Yes	Yes

=== Type 3 ===
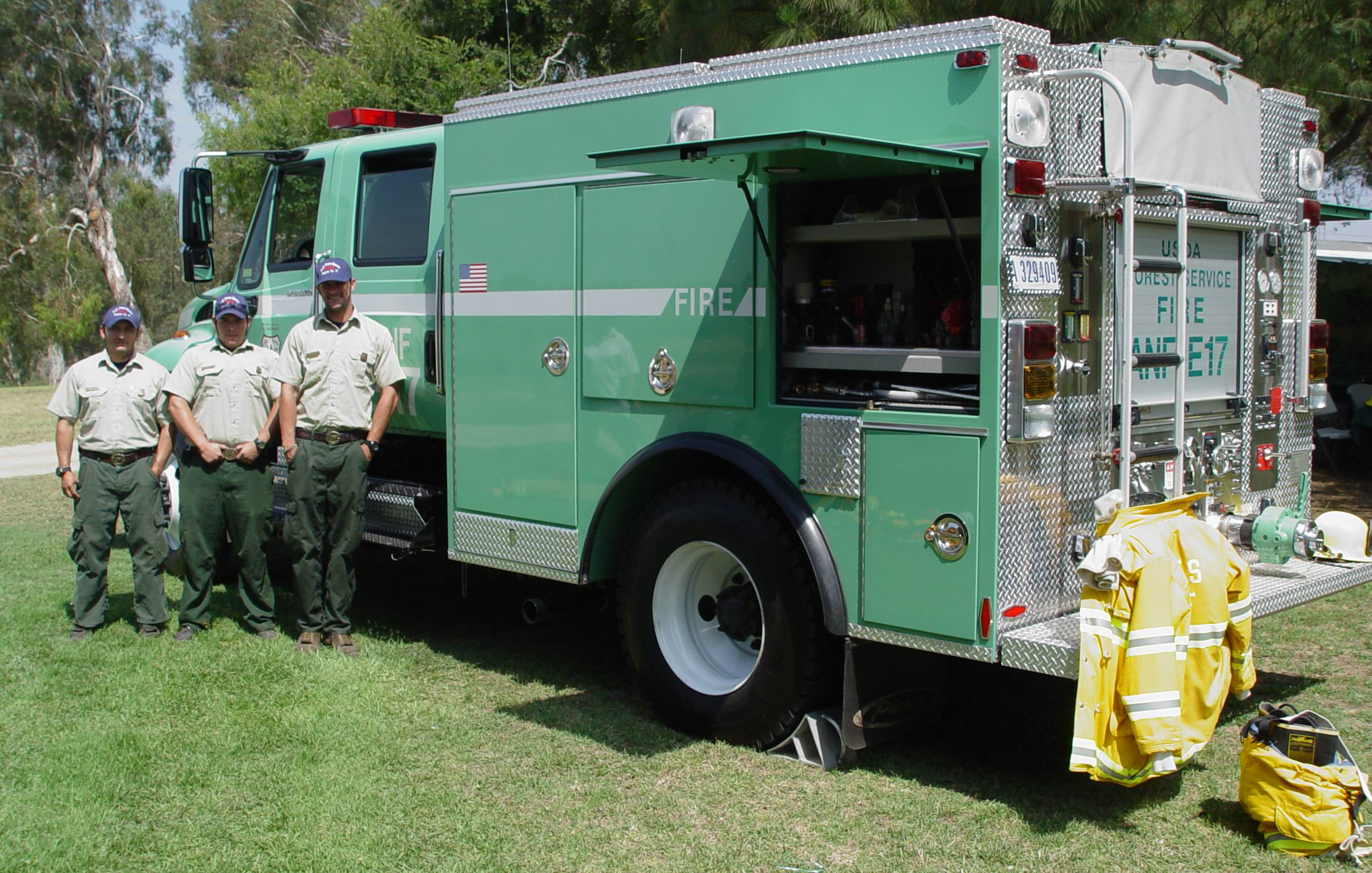
ANF E17 is a Type 3 engine that at the time of this photograph is stationed at the Chantry Flat Ranger Station in the Angeles National Forest, in the San Gabriel Mountains.

The Type 3 Engines traditionally have four-wheel drive to make driving over rough terrain easier; they can also be produced with standard rear wheel drive. Additionally the cab can either be two- or four-door holding up to five people, but no fewer than three. Almost all Type 3s have four doors as a crew size of five is optimum. Type 3s are required to have a minimum of 500 US gallons (1,900 L; 420 imp gal) of water, and be able to pump 150 US gallons per minute (9.5 litres per second; 120 imperial gallons per minute) at a pressure of 250 pounds per square inch (1,700 kPa). They have a typical GVWR of 26,000 pounds (12,000 kg). The Type 3 is the most popular engine in California due to the difficult road access to wildland fires; Type 3 engines typically have a shorter wheelbase allowing tighter turns on forest roads.

=== Type 4 ===
The Type 4 engine trades a smaller pump and less hose for a 50% larger tank. It is required to carry a minimum of 750 US gallons (2,800 L; 620 imp gal) of water, but only pump 50 US gallons per minute (3.2 litres per second; 42 imperial gallons per minute) at a pressure of 100 pounds per square inch (690 kPa). The typical GVWR is at least 26,000 pounds (12,000 kg).

=== Type 5 ===
Type 5s are normally used as an initial attack engine atop a medium duty chassis. The GVWR of the chassis is around 20,000 pounds (9,100 kg).

=== Type 6 ===
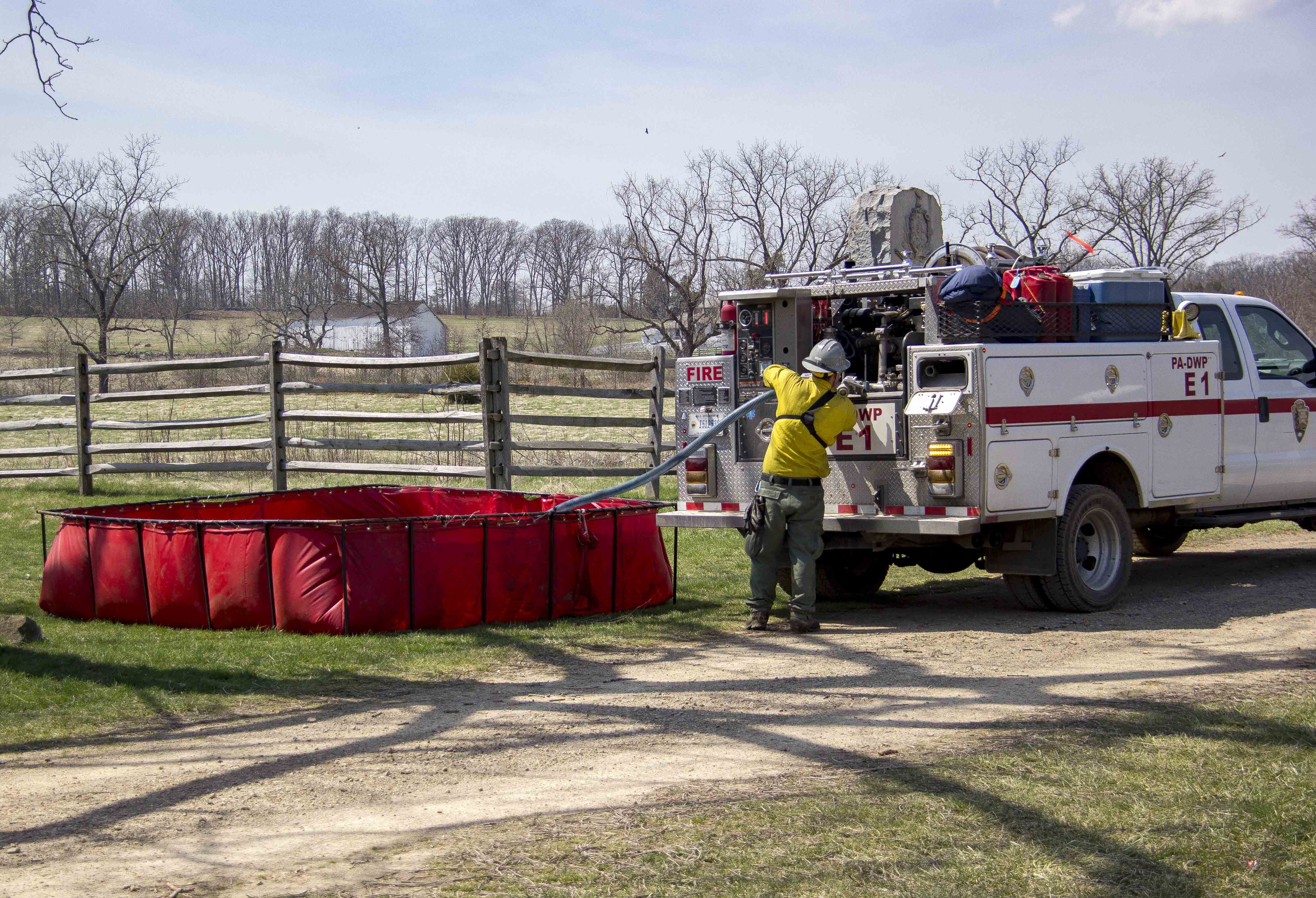
A firefighter refills his type-6 engine with water at a temporary holding tank at the Slyder farm.

Type 6 Engines are built on a pickup truck frame with a medium duty chassis giving a GVWR of 9,000–16,000 pounds (4,100–7,300 kg). They are required to carry a minimum of 150 US gallons (570 L; 120 imp gal) of water, but only pump 50 US gallons per minute (3.2 litres per second; 42 imperial gallons per minute) at a pressure of 100 pounds per square inch (690 kPa). In California these engines are staffed with one firefighter and used for patrols; for this reason the unit itself is sometimes called a patrol truck or simply "patrol". Most other dispatch areas require the Type 6 to have a minimum of 3 personnel (required by NWCG policies), and is more popular outside of California due to its ability to go where other engines cannot. Some Fire departments like CAL-Fire or city of Riverside fire use type 6 trucks as paramedic rescue squads

=== Type 7 – Prevention Module ===
Type 7 are patrol vehicles with a small pump and tank. As a light duty vehicle, they are in the range of 6,500–10,000 pounds (2,900–4,500 kg) GVWR. The vehicle has a small 50 US gallons (190 L; 42 imp gal) water tank and can pump 10 US gallons per minute (0.63 litres per second; 8.3 imperial gallons per minute) at a pressure of 100 pounds per square inch (690 kPa). It is a multipurpose unit used for patrol, mop up, or initial attack.

== NFPA 1906 ==
Additionally, there are requirements laid out by the National Fire Protection Association in NFPA 1906: Standard for Wildland Fire Apparatus.

== See also ==
- Wildfire suppression
- Wildfire suppression equipment and personnel
