= Ottawa Paramedic Service =

Canadian public safety agency

Agency overview
- Formed: January 1, 2001
- Jurisdiction: Ottawa (2,796 km^{2})
- Headquarters: 2465 Don Reid Drive
- Motto: UT SALUTIS VITAE QUOTIDIE (To Save Lives Everyday)
- Employees: 825
- Agency executive: Chief Pierre Poirier
- Parent agency: Emergency and Protective Services GM Anthony Di Monte
- Website: ottawa.ca/en/health-and-public-safety/ottawa-paramedic-service/

Ottawa Paramedic Service is a uniformed municipal public safety agency providing emergency and non-emergency paramedic care to residents and visitors of city of Ottawa, Ontario. It is the sole, licensed, statutory provider and is operated directly by the city. The Service is an independent third service provider. This means that it is part of the Emergency and Protective Services department of the city but functions as an independent and separate agency from other services. The Ottawa Paramedic Service operates in compliance with legislation and licensing standards overseen by the government of Ontario. It also provides routine, non-emergency transports and emergency paramedic coverage for special events. It is the only service provider permitted to service medical emergency calls in the City of Ottawa.

== History ==
The first known Ottawa (called Bytown) hospital was created in 1827 by Lt. Col. John By who was commissioned to build the canal and join the Ottawa river with Lake Ontario. This military hospital most likely had some form of ambulance, but no records or documentation can support its use. The population of Ottawa was only a few thousand, and it did not have an ambulance service since no general hospital existed.

=== Early diseases and first hospital ===
Communicable diseases, mostly malaria, cholera, influenza, typhus and smallpox were common causing the religious community to ask Montreal Grey Nuns for assistance in establishing a permanent hospital in By-Town. Elizabeth Bruyere opened the Ottawa General hospital on May 10, 1845. Located at 169 St. Patrick Street, it contained 7 beds. Their first patient transport was completed by the sisters on the same day, a 40-year-old tubercular patient who was brought in on a hand cart two pushing and two pulling. Mother Bruyere faced her first typhus outbreak in 1847, which led to the construction of an emergency hospital. Many Irish immigrants in that year were escaping Great Famine of Ireland, and searching for work on the Rideau Canal. More than 3,000 Irish immigrants passed through Ottawa in that year, causing disease rates to skyrocket. In this outbreak 172 patients of the 532 patients died. Even more devastating were 17 out of 21 nurses became infected while providing care but were able to recover. Mother Bruyere and the sisters would remove the deceased to the graveyard at night and bury them so that the residents would not be alarmed by the devastation Ottawa's outbreaks caused. This placed an enormous strain on Ottawa's infant health care system. Mother Bruyere dealt with three decades of severe outbreaks, traumas, and poverty in Ottawa; she died at 58 years on April 5, 1876.

=== City of Ottawa involvement ===
The first known ambulance reference is in the City of Ottawa by-laws and was possibly enforced earlier than 1890. It was written that police could use any for hire wagon to “assist in the conveyance of any person to hospital or elsewhere as may be required, who may be wounded or met with accident, or who may have been suddenly taken ill, provided the sickness is not infectious in nature, and such owner or driver shall be entitled after the performance of such service to the usual fare therefore from the proper authorities” This implies that any taxi, wagon, or cart was used by police to move patients around. This method would have been most effective in the early years since officers patrolled the streets and would have been notified of any traumatic or accidental emergency.

=== Ottawa's first public ambulance ===
The first designated and public ambulance operator was the Women’s Humane Society (Ottawa Humane Society) that began service shortly after their inception in 1888. Seeing a need in the Ottawa community, a hand ambulance was purchased for the conveyance of injured persons and children. In their first few years as a society, the scope included: “We believe it to be our duty bettering the lot of neglected children by urging legislation to provide foster homes; supervising the overhaul of Ottawa’s only ambulance; and stirring up the public conscience to the fair treatment of all animals..” In addition to their hand ambulance, they also became advocates for heroism and first aid resources. Each year, awards for Bravery were given out to members of the public who put their lives in danger for another. The Ottawa Humane Society also raised funds to have large waterproof banners with resuscitation instructions and rescue buoys were put in the most frequent drowning sites. In under ten years, it was clear that providing ambulance services for the City of Ottawa was too large of a service for the Humane Society. With the final report given on the condition of their ambulance, the hand ambulance was donated in 1895 to the City of Ottawa's fleet under the care of Mr. McKinstry of Queen Street.

The City of Ottawa accepted on October 6, 1890, to purchase a contagious disease ambulance (similar time frame to Women's Humane Society donating their ambulance). Medical Health Board wrote to the council, “The time has arrived when the City should own and control such means of conveyance”. Records suggest that the City of Ottawa owned the disease ambulance that became associated with the Strathcona Hospital and was used only for contagious disease cases. The horse-drawn ambulance was relieved of service in 1919 after Ottawa faced the 1918 Influenza Epidemic and was replaced by a much needed motorized ambulance. This vehicle was staffed with nursing students out of the Civic hospital and they attended the patients while a 'skilled chauffeur' was in charge of driving. This vehicle was not sent on emergencies with lights and sirens activated, but it was considered an ambulance. This vehicle was replaced again in the 1930s with a Hudson 8 ambulance. This vehicle was then taken out of service when the Strathcona Hospital closed.

=== Funeral homes come to Ottawa's aid ===
Each year the City of Ottawa would ask for tenders to provide ambulance service for emergency calls excluding contagious disease cases. A variety of offers would come in showing the vast interest in providing ambulance service, but it also showed a lack of direction since the lowest tender was almost always the one taken. Alphonse Julien, Woodburn, Gauthier, Landreville, Hulse, Brady and Harris, Whelan, Tubman, A.E. Veitch, Geo. B. Burney, Rogers, McEvoy, Radmore and Stewart, Rancine, and Fred N. Garrett funeral services were all known to bid on these contracts or offer private ambulance service for the residents of Ottawa from as early as 1898 to almost 1968. Other potential ambulance operators were Louis Duhamel a carriage maker turn of the century and ambulance mechanic, Medric Landreville (son of Joseph Landreville who owned Landreville Funeral Home) and Peter Shorkey operated taxi services in the 1930s as well as ambulance services. Arthur Wilson Ambulance Service provided service for a short period of time. These services valiantly took on the task of providing ambulance care, but with unpaid accounts, lack of accountability and few resources, each provider amalgamated, discontinued ambulance service and sold their equipment to the next generation of ambulance providers.

The next generation of ambulance providers were now primarily in the business of ambulance care instead of it being a secondary operation. There was a wide range of success for these services most notably were Exclusive Ambulance Service and Twin City Ambulance Service. Queensway Ambulance Service and Arthur Wilson Ambulance Services both existed for short periods of time, but very little to no information has survived to today.

Exclusive Ambulance began in 1948 when Eric Magladry returned home post war to find his wife Edith Magladry had purchased an ambulance service from three interns working out of the Civic Hospital. Living on 338 Somerset Street with the garage below, they began providing ambulance services to Ottawa. In 1955 the City of Ottawa renewed their contract with Exclusive ambulance after stating they had received satisfactory service. At this time they had three ambulances and charged five dollars per call. In 1961 the service was moved to 61 Louisa, possibly for expansion. This move was followed almost immediately by another when Louisa Street (and other nearby) residents were expropriated for the first Ottawa Urban Renewal Project – the building of the Queen Elizabeth Way (the 'Queensway' or Highway 417). The Magladry family and Exclusive Ambulance was moved to 71 Le Breton Street in November 1965, the property being sold for $42,500 and no remuneration was given to relocate Ottawa's largest ambulance service. Eric was forced to go farther in debt to support his business since many accounts went unpaid. Eric offered hospital bed delivery, home oxygen supplies, transfers, body removal and other medical equipment needs to citizens in order to offset the debt incurred by completing ambulance calls. Eric reported to the Ottawa Journal in 1964 that 40% of his accounts are unpaid. Every attendant that worked for Eric speaks of his dedication to his patients as well as his business. Eric Magladry created uniforms, codes and other protocols to provide a better standard of care for the citizens of Ottawa. In 1966 the City of Ottawa renewed their contract with Exclusive. Listed in this contract were 7 vehicles. All are specially designed ambulances on Cadillac chassis. (4-1954, 1–1955, 2-1956 models) Exclusive has 20 members on staff and all have St. John's Ambulance Certificates and attend annual refresher courses.

Twin City Ambulance Service Gordon Hiscoe and his wife Valeda Hiscoe purchased a home at 95 Selkirk in Eastview (now called Vanier). In the early 1950s, Gordon witnessed a pedestrian struck by a vehicle. By no fault of their own, Exclusive Ambulance being a west end service took over 45 minutes to respond to the dying patient. After seeing the need for more ambulance services, Gordon felt it was his moral responsibility to the general public to provide care and transportation for these patients. Gordon hired a variety of employees, volunteer firefighters, orderlies at the hospitals, nurses and anyone else who expressed interest in the service. All modifications were done through an Ottawa company or done in the garage at 95 Selkirk. No standard for how these vehicles should be altered existed at this time, Gordon and Ed had vehicles altered to meet their needs.

The dynamics of the emergency call varied from service to service, with Twin City, they had a ‘driver’ and the ‘attendant’. The driver was always more senior, because payment occurred when the patient arrived at hospital. Any first aid treatments were secondary to this. Minimal extrication equipment existed, so the patient would be taken out of the building on the stretcher regardless of the number of stairs (differing greatly from today, when we now have other means of moving patients to the stretcher). Injuries to ambulance attendants was frequent and often untreated.

Queensway Ambulance Service started in 1959 at 827 Campbell Avenue by Bryan W. Fuller. After only five years Bryan reported to the Ottawa Journal that in 1963 his yearly income was $16,203 representing a net loss. He stated that police and fire departments would act as ambulances, passersby would remove patients and that 33% of all his medical calls were uncollectable. Bryan operates 2 vehicles and employed 15 men in this timeframe. On July 5, 1964, his vehicle was dispatched to a motor vehicle collision they lost control and collided with the 417 overpass at Woodroffe. Bryan W. Fuller was sent to hospital with potential internal injuries and his partner was Warren Cushman was treated and released. After this incident, Bryan sold his remaining assets to Twin City Ambulance and pursued other employment.

Both Twin City and Exclusive Ambulance Services responded to the Heron Bridge Collapse on August 10, 1966. Both services worked tirelessly to help treat and account for all victims involved.

=== Provincial changes for Ontario ===
The first Ambulance Act entitled, “An Act to promote Ambulance Services and improve their Standards” was created in the fiscal year of 1966-1967 and was a five-page document that was the conceptual framework for an evolving ambulance service system in Ontario. This enabling legislation allowed the Minister of Health and that department the legal framework to begin the creation and assessment of the requirements for Ontario's ambulance response system. The Act contained basic information to begin regulating ambulance services such as definitions of terms and levels of authority. This Act would effect all forms of ambulance services in Ontario regardless of ownership. The Ontario Hospital Services Commission was created within the provincial government to oversee the transition of ambulance services into a standardized system. These changes were spearheaded by Dr. Norman McNally-who has been named "the Father of EMS in Ontario".

On July 1, 1968, all Ontario ambulance services became part of the Ontario Hospital Services Commission (Ministry of Health and Long Term Care). Persons insured with O.H.S.C are entitled to use an ambulance will only be required to pay 25% of the scheduled rates. This transition as a whole was positive for the workforce of attendants. A transition that demanded better equipment, pay, standards of care and ensured proper ambulances would be used to transport patients instead of homemade vehicles. These changes came at the expense of the Hiscoe and MaGladry families who spent all their time and money to provide ambulance care.

By the end of the transition phase in 1974 Ottawa Ambulance Service was purchased by the newly formed Ambulance Services Branch of the Ministry of Health and all the employees became Crown Agents.

By 1975 the Ambulance Act was updated to contain the new standardized criteria for employment with a service as well as the service and its equipment.

Ottawa Ambulance Service continued to operate from 1975 to 1984 when the service name was changed to "Ottawa-Carleton Regional Ambulance Service". This name remained the same until 2001.

In 1984 changes occurred in the periphery of Ottawa. Areas such as Orleans, Kanata, Osgoode, Richmond and Barrhaven expanded quickly and required better ambulance coverage. Bases and contracts were drawn up creating the following five privately owned ambulance services that also responded to Ottawa:

Rockland Orleans Ambulance Service: Orleans base opened in November 1984 (was briefly owned by Ottawa) and was owned by Bernard Thivierge.

Arnprior-Kanata Ambulance Service: Kanata base opened in November 1984 and was owned by Doug Powell.

Carleton Place-Richmond Ambulance Service: Richmond base opened in 1981 due to local pressure for better coverage. This service was owned by Mr. Alan Barker of Carleton Place.

St. Lawrence and District Ambulance Service: This service owned or operated the Barrhaven post (1984) and Nepean post (1984). Although once the hunt club bridge became operational, the Nepean post was closed and SLDAS took over the Queensway Carleton Hospital ambulance base. This service was run by Mr. Ron Dalgleish until July 21, 1997, when it was sold to Rural Metro who ran the service until 2001.

Osgoode and District Ambulance Service: This service was opened in April 1988 under a contract with St Lawrence and District Ambulance Service. Rural Metro owned this service for a period of a few months until it went to tender again. Then the service was owned by Eastern Medical Services (created and owned by Doug Powell, Jim McIsaac and Michel Chretien) until 2001.

=== Ottawa EMS ===
The Ottawa EMS-SMU came into existence on January 1, 2001, when six separate agencies providing Ambulance and Paramedic care to the then Regional Municipality of Ottawa-Carleton were amalgamated into one service. St. Lawrence & District Ambulance Services in Nepean, Ontario (SLDAS), Ottawa Carleton Regional Ambulance Service in Ottawa (OCRAS), Rockland/Orleans in Orleans, Ontario (ROAS), Carleton Place/Richmond in Richmond, Ontario, Kanata/Arnprior Ambulance in Kanata, Ontario, and Eastern Medical in Osgoode, Ontario, all became the Ottawa Paramedic Service. City council named Anthony Di Monte as the first Chief of the service. In 2003 the city also assumed control of the communications centre which was, at that time, run by a third party for the Government of Ontario.

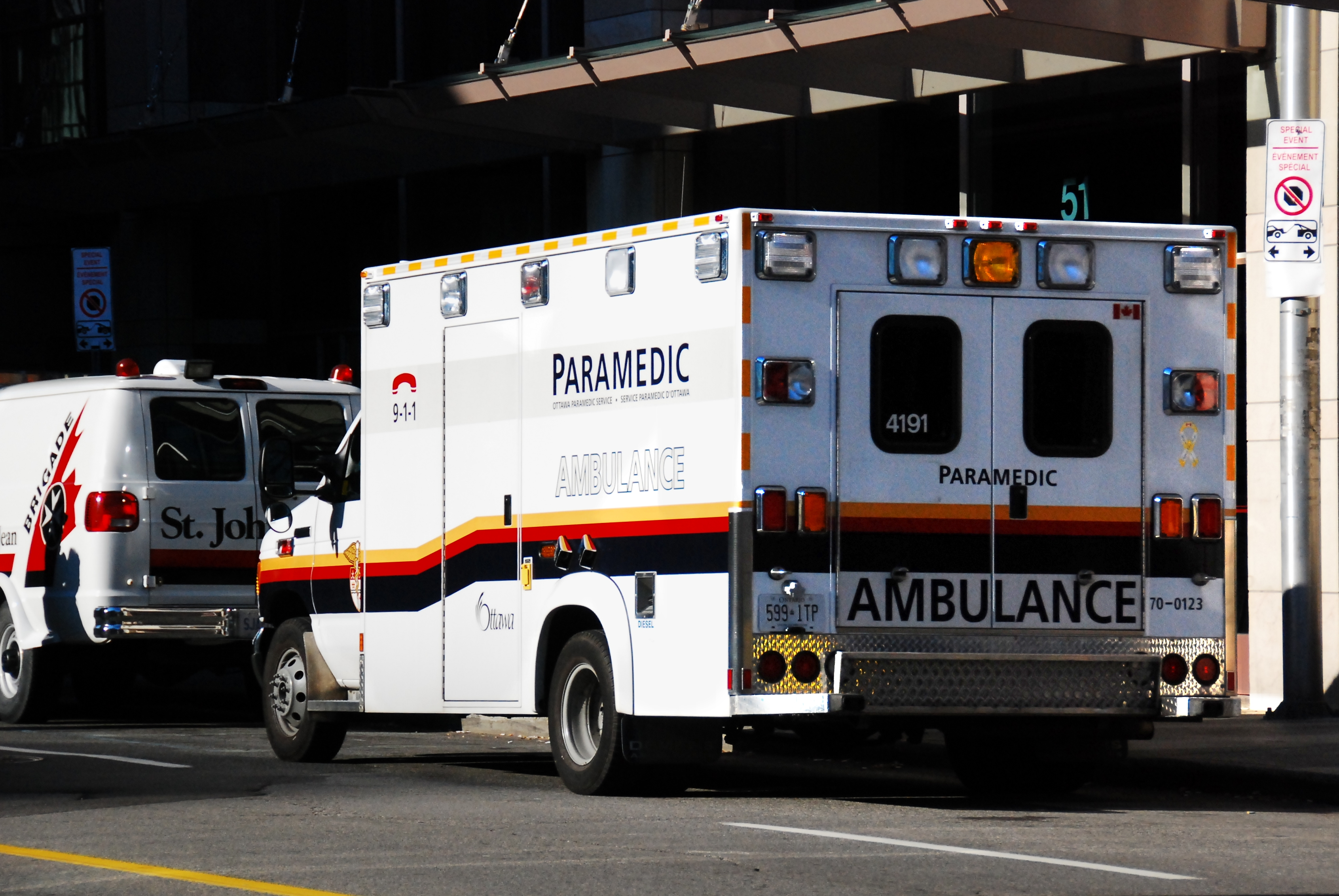
An Ottawa Paramedic Service ambulance parked on Queen Street, during the 2007 Remembrance Day ceremonies in Ottawa. In front of the ambulance is a St. John's Ambulance van.

In the 1980s better ambulances and equipment became the Ministry of Health and Long-Term Care's priority. In the 1990s, semi-automatic Defibrillators and Symptom relief medications administration became the norm for paramedic Scope of practice. Due primarily to local grassroots efforts (Action Paramedic led by the ACT Foundation), political pressure and a research program called the Ontario Prehospital Advanced Life Support Studies (OPALS) Ottawa was the first center in Ontario to be selected to introduce fully trained Advanced Care Paramedics (ACP) as part of a Ministry of Health province-wide project. As we know them today ACPs have been in Ottawa since 1995. Various Advanced Life Support (ALS) response programs had been developed and implemented with much less success over the past 40 years throughout Ontario. Until 2001, Ottawa had never had a single agency provide comprehensive ACP paramedic treatment in the community. Prior to then it was typically several services operating under a single communications radio network offering only primary care paramedic (PCP) level of treatment and response.

The Ottawa Paramedic Service is part of a larger city department comprising Ottawa By-law Services, Corporate Security and Emergency Management and Ottawa Fire Services. Like many other models the Paramedic Service and Fire Service are sister agencies within a single department, distinct but culturally separate. A single department overseen by a General Manager with a Paramedic Chief and a Fire Chief each with their mandate serving residents and the community.

== Service ==
The service is a structured hierarchy with a clearly defined rank system conforming to a national and provincial paramedic visual identity. The Paramedic Chief is the most senior leader in the Service and is responsible for the overall effective operation of the Ottawa Paramedic Service.

The office of the chief is the most senior administrative body within the branch. Under this office the service is organized into four broad functional groups called divisions. All divisions report to the Chief. Each division is further divided into sections of operational work areas. Sections may be divided into teams, units or in the case of larger sections, such as in the Operations Division, platoons. Divisions are led by a Deputy Chief, Sections by Commanders and units, teams or platoons are led by Superintendents. The Chief, Deputy Chiefs, Commanders and Superintendents together are the formal leadership team of the service.

The Service Executive Team (the Executive) is composed of the service's most senior staff including the Chief and the divisional deputies. The Senior Management Team (SMT) comprises the Executive and all command staff (the Commanders). Commanders can be responsible for 6 to 10 Superintendents and overall up to 120 staff in total. Superintendents are the front line supervisors of the service and, depending on their role, can be responsible for from 6 to 24 personnel each.

- Operations Division - Led by a Paramedic Deputy Chief the division is divided into four sections (Alpha, Bravo, Charlie and Delta) which are led by a Commander with five platoons, each led by Superintendents
- Communications Division - Is divided into two sections, each led by a Commander including Communications Operations (Medical Dispatch) and Performance Management
- Technical Services Division - Led by a Paramedic Deputy Chief the division is divided into three sections, each led by a Commander including Logistics, Quality Assurance and the training and development section
- Special Operations Division - Led by a Paramedic Deputy Chief along with two Commanders is responsible for: Paramedic Bike Unit, Paramedic Tactical Unit, USAR [urban search and rescue], Public Support Unit, the Paramedic Marine Unit, the Ottawa Medical Venturer Unit (MedVent) and is also responsible for contingency, special event and emergency planning as well as Community Medicine

== Personnel ==
1 Chief

4 Deputy Chiefs

12 Commanders

40 Superintendents (Operations, Clinical Training, Logistics, Communications, Professional Standards, Quality Review and Public Information)

70 Communications Officers

8 Administrative support personnel (including Quality Assurance/Improvement Clerks, Program Performance Analysts, Administrative Assistants and other non-uniformed personnel)

44 Equipment and Supply Technicians

1 Biomedical Engineer

12 Public Education Officers

440 Advanced and Primary Care Paramedics (sub-specialties of Marine, Tactical, USAR, CBRNE as well as others)

== Fleet ==
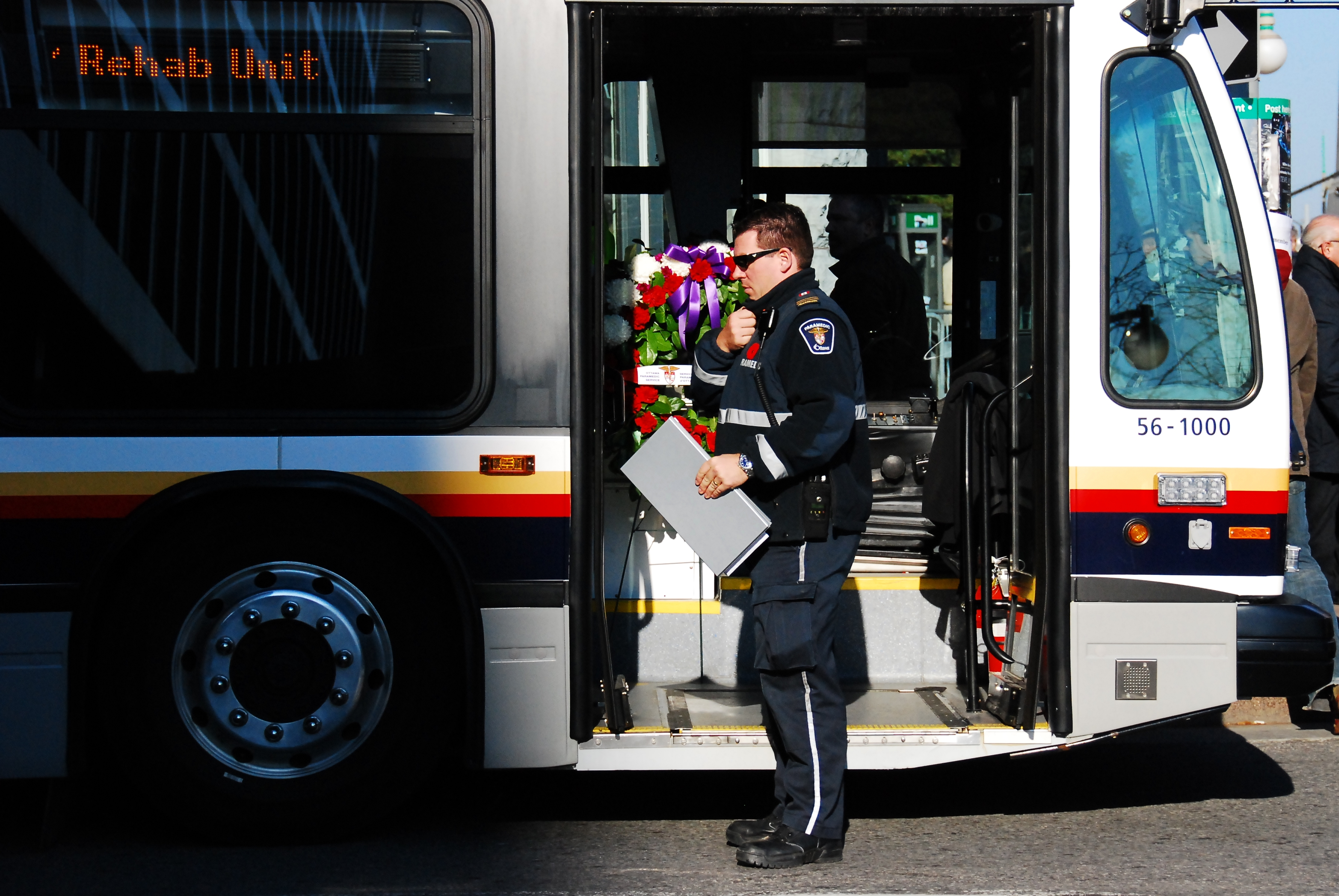
A paramedic outside the Treatment and Rehabilitation Unit, during the Remembrance Day ceremonies in Ottawa

86 Paramedic Units (Type III) - Demers Ambulances Mystère MX160A (on Ford E-Series chassis), all equipped with Stryker Power Load

4 Special Response Units (Ford F Series/Demers Type 1)

1 Neonatal Transfer Unit (Type III with Stryker Power Load)

7 Supervisor Response Vehicles (Ford Explorer Police Interceptors)

18 Paramedic Response Units (Ford Taurus and Ford Explorer Police Interceptors)

2 Off Road Rescue Units (4x4 ASAP Units)

1 Treatment and Rehabilitation Unit (Nova Bus LFS)

2 Multi Patient Units

2 Emergency Shelter trailers

2 Multi-Casualty Incident (disaster supplies) trailers

== Facilities ==
- Headquarters Campus - Located at 2495 Don Reid Drive in Ottawa (The first LEED-certified building in the city)
- The campus - Is divided into two distinct areas with separate buildings. One 30,000-square-foot (2,800 m^{2}) building houses the Paramedic Communications Centre (2475 Don Reid), the Ministry of Health Field Office and the Regional Paramedic Program for Eastern Ontario (RPPEO, the base Hospital). The second building is the administrative and operational centre for all Paramedic Service operations. This building serves as the 100,000-square-foot (9,300 m^{2}) single start station for all urban paramedic operations in the city
- Paramedic Posts - 16 strategically located throughout the city for paramedic personnel to have down time between calls
- Combined Services Facilities - 8 facilities located in sub-urban and rural areas. The Emergency and Protective Services (EPS) combined services buildings house part-time fire service personnel and full-time Paramedics. These combined service Paramedic Posts were report to work locations outside of the urban core and are shared with other city staff such as police and fire. They are now used the same as Paramedic Posts with indoor facilities.

== Level of care ==
- Note: The Paramedic Service is the only licensed agency in Ottawa that employs and responds certified paramedics. No other agency employs or responds with paramedics in any capacity in the city. (With the exception of ornge)
- Advanced and Primary Care Paramedicine
- Ottawa Paramedics utilize special emergency bypass protocols as well as critical interventions not normally associated with ACP or PCP level of care.
- Close to 2000 public access defibrillators (PAD) are located throughout the city in certain buildings such as a pools, hockey rinks and other public facilities as well as in all marked police cars and some fire vehicles.
- Police officers and fire service personnel have basic first aid training and also provide fully automatic defibrillation under a first responder program. Both services may be asked to respond to certain call types at the request of the paramedic service.
- All defibrillators and training for the PAD program as well as for first responders are provided by, maintained and administered by the Ottawa Paramedic Service, Community Medicine program

== Research ==
The Ottawa Paramedic Service has a research committee comprising front-line personnel leading, evaluating and directing what research the service will enter into and recommend with whom the service will partner in research

- The Ottawa Paramedic Service is an agency in paramedic and emergency medical research participating in research programs and studies including:
1. Resuscitation Outcomes Consortium
2. Ottawa C-Spine study
3. Paramedic STEMI bypass
4. Paramedics Assessing Elders at Risk of Independence Loss (PERIL) and many others

== See also ==
Paramedicine in Canada

- List of EMS Services in Ontario
- Paramedics in Canada
- Emergency Medical Services in Canada

Emergency Services in Ottawa

- Ottawa Police Service
- Ottawa Fire Service
- Ottawa By-law Services
