= George Floyd protests in Canada =

2020 protests in Canada against police brutality

- Part of George Floyd protests
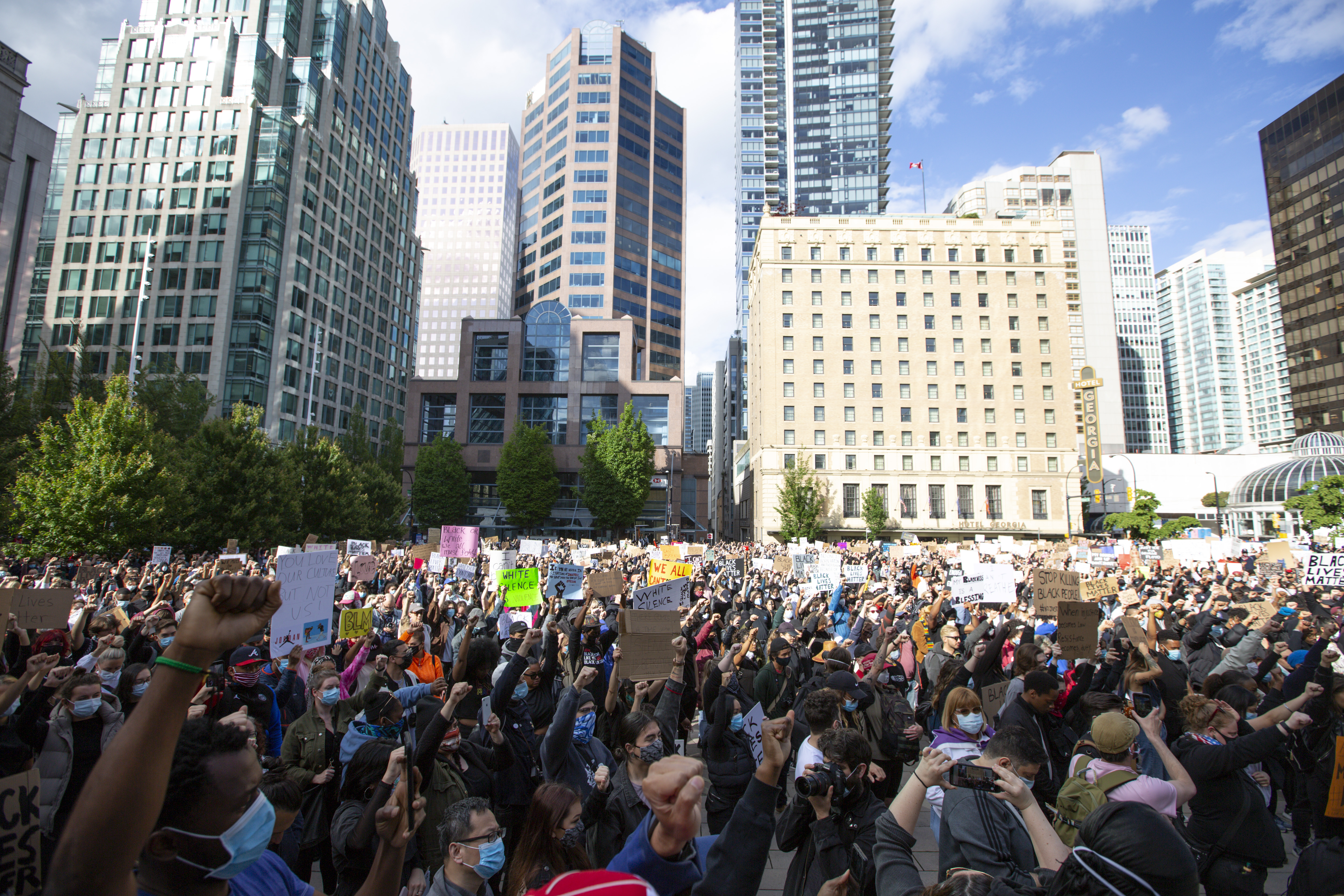
- George Floyd protests in Vancouver.
- Date: May 30 – June 14, 2020 (2 weeks and 1 day)
- Location: Canada
- Caused by: Police brutality; Institutional racism against black Canadians; Institutional racism against indigenous Canadians; Reaction to the murder of George Floyd

Cities in Canada in which a protest with about 100 or more participants was held

Shortly after protests seeking justice for George Floyd, an African-American who was accidentally killed during a police arrest, began in the United States, people in Canada protested to show solidarity with Americans and to demonstrate against issues with police or racism in Canada. Vigils and protests of up to thousands of participants took place in all 10 provinces and all 3 territories of Canada.

== Reactions ==
=== Political ===
Canadian Prime Minister Justin Trudeau called for Canada to "stand together in solidarity" against racial discrimination. He said Canadians are watching the police violence in the United States in "shock and horror." When Trudeau was asked about U.S. President Donald Trump's threats to use military force against protesters, he paused for 21 seconds before responding diplomatically. He attended an afternoon protest on Parliament Hill on 5 June where he knelt in solidarity with protesters.

== Demonstrations ==
=== Alberta ===
- Calgary: About 100 protesters initially assembled in Fish Creek Park on 31 May, with subsequent protests each over 1,500 in Downtown Calgary on 1 June, 3 June, and 6 June.
- Edmonton: On 5 June, a protest organized by an Edmonton anti-racism group 'A Fight For Equity' was held near the Alberta Legislature with over 15,000 attendees.
- Innisfail: A protest against racism and police brutality was held in a parking lot on 13 June. The event was almost cancelled by the organizer due to a hateful backlash, but 350 people showed up and the rally went through.
- Lacombe: Over 300 people gathered outside the Lacombe Memorial Centre for a peaceful protest on 19 June.
- Lethbridge: Over 1,000 people gathered outside City Hall on 4 June.
- Medicine Hat: Approximately 350 people gathered in front of city hall on 5 June to rally against racism and police brutality.
- Lloydminster: 80 people gathered at the city hall on 5 June to show solidarity with the Black Lives Matter movement.
- Red Deer: A series of three protests took place from 1 June to 6 June in Red Deer, drawing a combined 1,650 protesters.

=== British Columbia ===
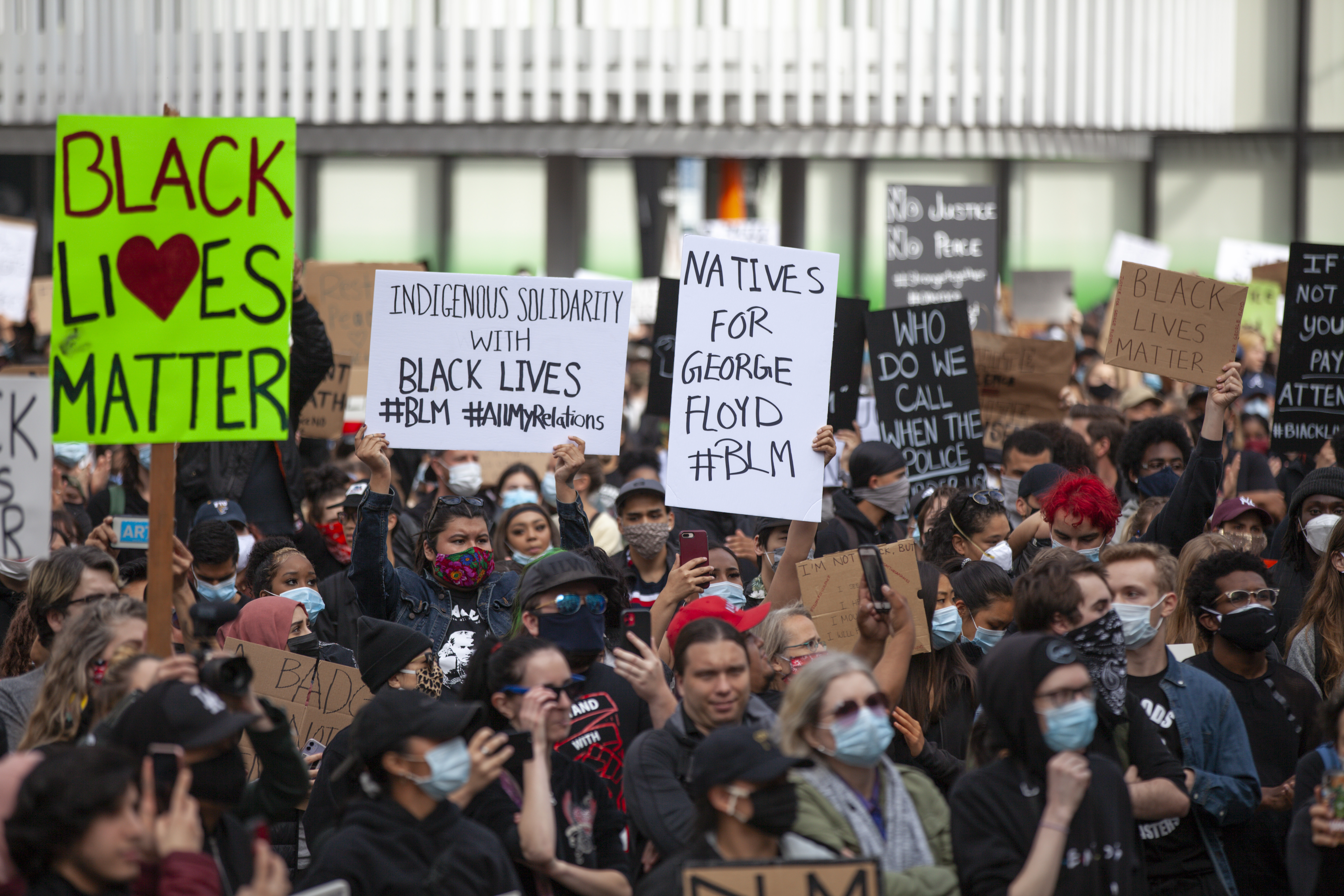
Protest at the Vancouver Art Gallery in Vancouver on 31 May

- Abbotsford: At least one hundred protested in Abbotsford on 5 June.
- Chilliwack: On 5 June, hundreds of protesters marched through the streets to Central Community Park in support of George Floyd and Black Lives Matter.
- Comox Valley: Several hundred people gathered in Courtenay on 5 June for a rally and memorial led by Black and indigenous community members. Around 250 people met on 6 June to protest roadside with signs, and knelt for eight minutes at noon.
- Kelowna: Around 300 people gathered in Stuart Park on 5 June to protest the murder of George Floyd.
- Nanaimo: On 5 June, hundreds of protesters gathered in Maffeo Sutton Park to support Black Lives Matter.
- Prince George: On 5 June, about 300 protesters observed eight minutes of silence outside city hall. Indigenous encounters with the police were also addressed.
- Squamish: Hundreds of protesters gathered at the O'Siyam Pavilion in Downtown Squamish for a rally on 6 June, introduced by Indigenous and Black members of the community and ending in a public forum.
- Vancouver: About 100 protesters marched in Vancouver's Downtown Eastside, on 30 May. The following day, 31 May, thousands gathered peacefully in front of the Vancouver Art Gallery to protest police violence and white supremacy. Another rally in Vancouver against police violence and systemic racism occurred on 5 June. On 13 June, about 50 protesters blocked the Georgia and Dunsmuir viaducts. The protest continued until 15 June, when police ordered the protesters to move. Seven people who refused were arrested.
- Victoria: Dozens gathered at Centennial Square on Monday afternoon, 1 June, for a march to the grounds of the British Columbia Parliament Buildings, followed by an evening vigil.

=== Manitoba ===
- Brandon: On 5 June, over 200 people marched from the Healthy Living Centre at Brandon University through the streets of Brandon to protest racism and the murder of George Floyd.
- Winnipeg: Approximately 2,000 people gathered at the Manitoba Legislature on 5 June. A Black and Indigenous Lives Matter rally was held on 4 July where some protesters were attacked with hockey sticks.

=== New Brunswick ===
- Fredericton: Thousands of people gathered at Fredericton City Hall on 2 June to protest the murder of George Floyd. The event, which was organized by the New Brunswick African Association, saw several major streets blocked as protesters marched to City Hall.
- Moncton: Over 500 people protested peacefully outside Moncton City Hall on 1 June. The event was organized by a high school student. A march occurred on 5 June.
- Sackville: Nearly 300 people showed up to an anti-racism rally on 3 June. They held an eight-minute moment of silence outside the post office to honour George Floyd.
- Saint John: Thousands of people rallied in Saint John on June 14, showing their support for the Black Lives Matter movement. The rally started in King's Square, with the participants marching through Saint John, ending at the Saint John City Hall for a moment of silence.

=== Newfoundland and Labrador ===
- St. John's: At the Confederation Building, thousands of people held a rally on 6 June.

=== Northwest Territories ===
- Fort Smith: About 60 people met at the centre of town to protest against racism. Drivers honked their horns in support, and a couple of RCMP officers dropped by.
- Yellowknife: Hundreds of people congregated at the Multiplex Area and marched down Franklin Avenue toward City Hall and the RCMP station in a peaceful protest against racism. Outside the RCMP station, protesters chanted for the defunding of police. Protesters also took a knee and raised their fists in solidarity, and some RCMP officers took a knee as well.

=== Nova Scotia ===
- Halifax: Thousands of people protested peacefully in downtown Halifax on 1 June, filling up Spring Garden Road and taking a knee for eight minutes and forty-six seconds.
- Sydney: Hundreds of demonstrators showed up at the Cape Breton Regional Police headquarters on 4 June to protest racism and police brutality.
- Yarmouth: On 7 June, hundreds protested at a Black Lives Matter anti-racism rally. Protesters wore masks and took social distancing precautions while taking a knee for eight minutes and forty-six seconds.

=== Nunavut ===
- Iqaluit: A protest of over 200 people, organized by Nunavut Black History Society, was held in the Four Corners intersection. Protesters also sought justice for an unnamed Kinngait man who was placed into custody after apparently being knocked down by an RCMP officer with a truck door and then beaten up by an inmate so severely that he was flown to Iqaluit for medical attention. Organizers also asked the crowd to kneel for eight minutes and forty-six seconds.

=== Ontario ===
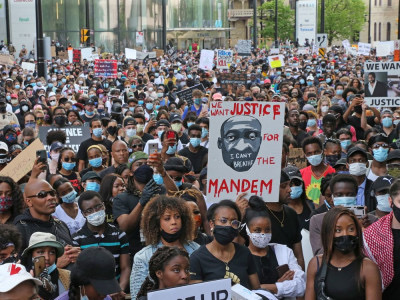
Protest in Ottawa on 5 June

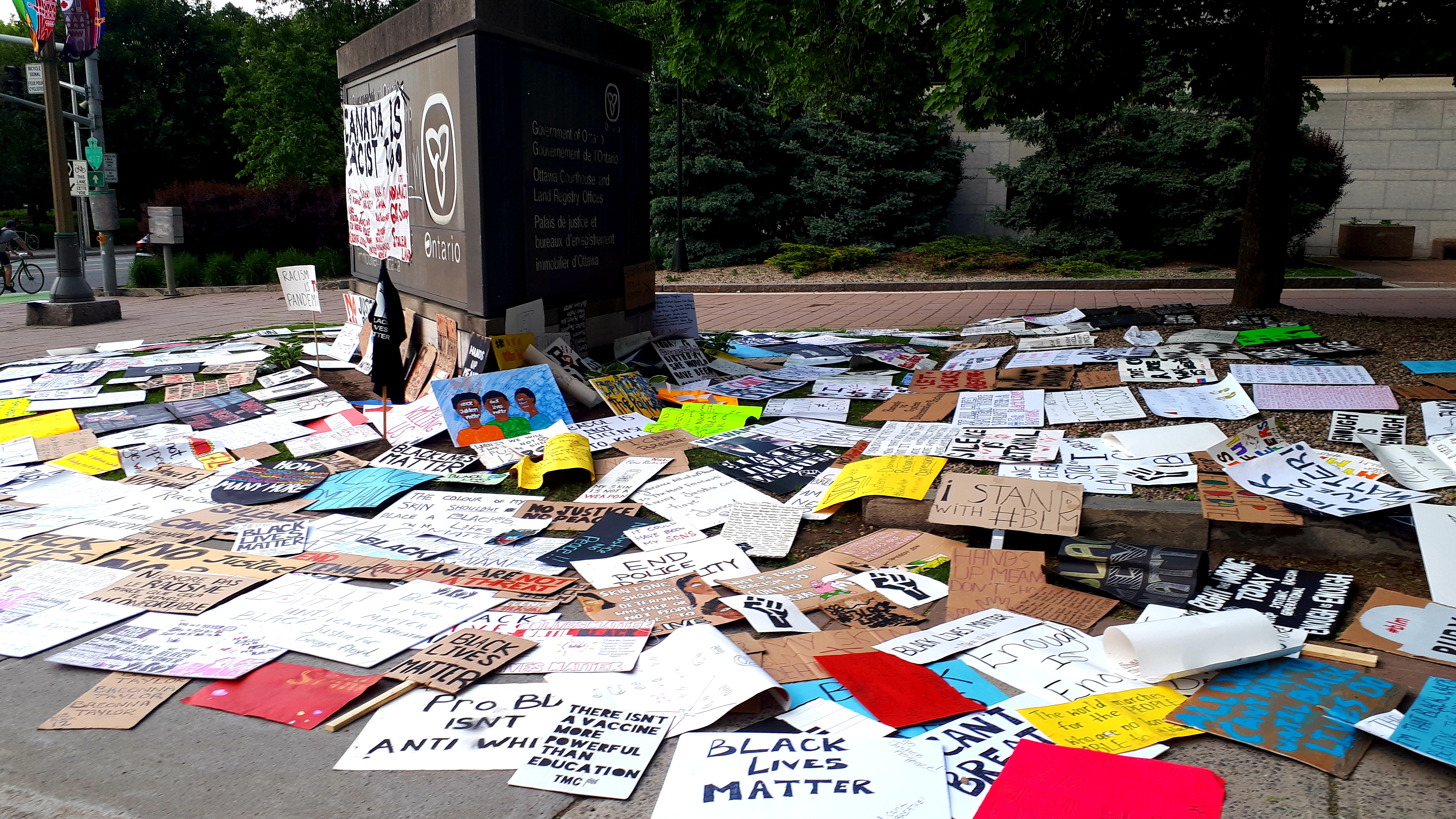
Protest signs left at the Ottawa Courthouse on 5 June

- Barrie: 5 June and 6 June: Over 1,000 people participated in a 'Justice for Black Lives' rally in Barrie. Organized by Black Lives Matter, the protest and march began at City Hall at 2 p.m. and then headed along Mulcaster and Simcoe Streets to Meridian Place to where people gathered to hear speeches from people about systemic racism.
- Burlington: 4 June: Several hundred protesters marched from Walkers Line and New Street to Burlington City Hall and held a rally to raise awareness of anti-black racism and stand in solidarity with protests happening across North America.
- Hamilton: 1 June: A crowd of 400-500 people showed up for a peaceful protest at Gore Park, organized by Michael St. Jean of Foreign Waves International, and co-organizers Mykel, Chancese, and Debbie.
- Kingston: 2 June: The City of Kingston lowered its city flags in solidarity with hundreds who turned out for a rally and vigil held in McBurney Park to show solidarity with protests across Canada, as well as the U.S., and around the world. On 6 June, hundreds gathered again for the 'Justice for George Floyd & All Police Racism Victims' vigil in Confederation Park across from Kingston City Hall to demand justice for anti-Black racism in Canada and to honour George Floyd.
- Kitchener: Around 20,000 people showed up to a march in Downtown Kitchener on 3 June. The group walked the streets around the Downtown core before taking a knee and raising their fist on Charles Street.
- London: 6 June: Roughly 10,000 protesters gathered in Victoria Park to listen to speeches before peacefully marching for several blocks through the city's downtown area.
- Mississauga: On 7 June, a group of demonstrators began marching from Celebration Square into the city streets. Organizers of the protest called for police officers in the Peel Region to be required to wear body cameras.
- Niagara Falls: On 6 June, thousands of people gathered for a protest to show support for demonstrators in neighboring Niagara Falls, New York.
- North Bay: On 6 June, around 2,000 peaceful protesters gathered at a field behind Memorial Gardens and marched to City Hall, where they packed into Vanier Square to protest the murder of George Floyd.
- Oshawa: On 7 June, hundreds of people gathered for a peaceful protest at Memorial Park to support Black Lives Matter and George Floyd.
- Ottawa: On 5 June, an estimated 20,000 people took part in protest and march in front of Parliament Hill, the United States Embassy, and continued past the Senate of Canada Building, to the Human Rights Monument. The march was named No Peace Until Justice Ottawa, and was a march of solidarity in honour of George Floyd, anti-black racism, and police brutality. The march was attended by politicians including Justin Trudeau, the Prime Minister of Canada. The event featured speeches and an eight-minute and 46 second moment of silence, before marching through Downtown Ottawa. The crowd chanted "Black Lives Matter", "No justice, no peace", and held up signs denouncing police brutality, including the murder of an unarmed black man by Ottawa Police. Some businesses and banks downtown boarded up windows in advance of the march, although there were no reports of damage and only a few minor physical altercations with police occurred.
- Peterborough: On 2 June, hundreds of protesters gathered for a rally in Peterborough's Millennium Park and marched to Confederation Square, across from the city hall, for a second peaceful rally.
- Sudbury: Approximately 200 people gathered peacefully on 31 May in front of the city's courthouse and marched through downtown, ending at police headquarters. Another protest, organized by a group of Black activists, took place on June 19 in honour of Juneteenth and drew more than 300 protesters. This marked the first rally of Black Lives Matter - Sudbury, a nonprofit organization dedicated to dismantling systemic racism and supporting cultural creation in Northern Ontario.
- Thunder Bay: 5 June: More than 2,000 Black Lives Matter protesters gathered for a rally at Waverley Park to protest police brutality and injustice facing black people and Indigenous people.

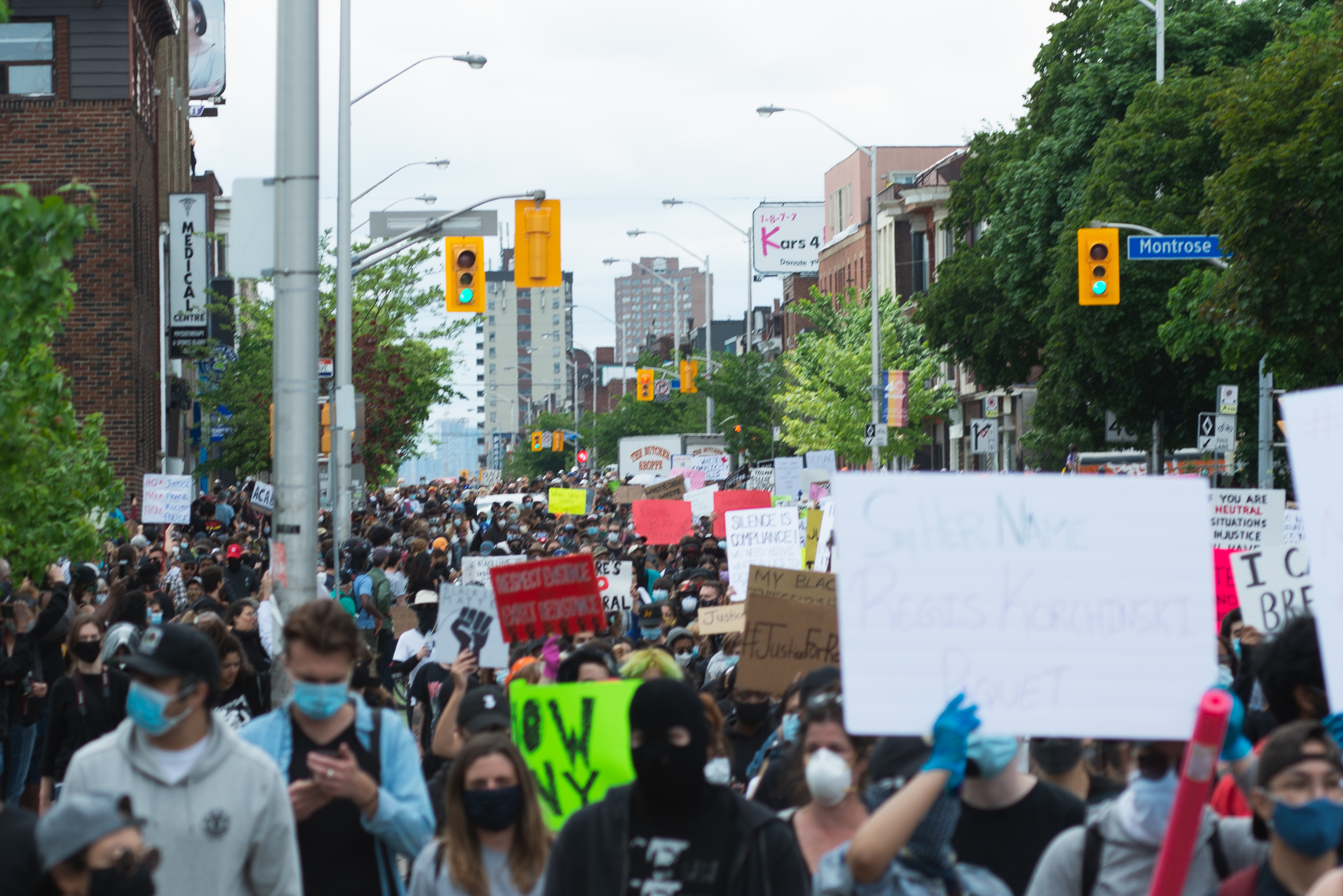
Protest in Toronto on 30 May

- Toronto: Over 4,000 individuals peacefully marched from Christie Park to Toronto Police Headquarters in protest against anti-black and anti-indigenous racism on 30 May following the death of Regis Korchinski-Paquet, a Black Canadian woman who fell from a high-rise building on 27 May in the presence of police. A second protest of similar scale happened on 5 June, where Chief of Toronto Police Services, Mark Saunders knelt with protesters in solidarity. On 6 June, thousands of people took to Toronto streets in two separate events to protest anti-black racism and police brutality. One began at Nathan Phillips Square outside city hall and marched to Yonge-Dundas Square. A man who appeared at the start of the protest wearing blackface was escorted out of the public square by Toronto Police Service. The police initially told media outlet that the man was arrested for breach of the peace and charged, but have since said no charges have been laid and “inquiries continue.” The protesters chanted "Black Lives Matter" and held up signs that read "No Justice No Peace" and "Yes it's here too Ford" in reference to comments the Premier made earlier in the week in regards to systemic racism in Canada. The protesters then marched on University Avenue to the U.S. consulate, where they took a knee with police officers. The second protest at Trinity Bellwoods Park in the city's west end, and marched to the Ontario legislature. After speeches at both destinations, the protests continued to Toronto Police headquarters on College Street, where they took a knee and chanted: "No justice, no peace."
- Windsor: Hundreds of protesters marched along the waterfront on 31 May.

=== Prince Edward Island ===
- Charlottetown: About 25 people peacefully protested outside Province House, the provincial legislative building, despite rainfall. Hundreds of protesters dressed in black in a march organized by Black Cultural Society of Prince Edward Island.

=== Quebec ===
Montreal protest on 31 May 2020

- Montreal: Thousands attended a protest outside the Montreal police headquarters on 31 May. The protests eventually escalated into unrest, and police fired tear gas. Several store windows were damaged, and some items were stolen. Eleven arrests were made, including one for assault. Several thousands protesters held another rally and march on 7 June.
- Quebec City: In front of parliament, thousands of people held a rally on 7 June.
- Repentigny: 5 June: About 100 protesters lit candles outside the Repentigny police station. Several black residents told personal stories of being racially profiled in this small suburban area 40 miles north of Montreal.
- Rimouski: At Beauséjour Park, around 400 people held a rally on 7 June.
- Rouyn-Noranda: At the Place de la Citoyenneté et de la Coopération, around 250 people held a rally organized by the group La Mosaïque on 8 June.
- Saguenay: At Place du Citoyen, around 100 people held a rally on 1 June.
- Sept-Îles: On 7 June, around 150 people marched to the Sûreté du Québec police station to rally against police brutality.
- Sherbrooke: Between 2,500 and 3,000 people marched from the Sherbrooke Station market to the police station on 7 June to protest police violence.
- Trois-Rivières: Around a thousand people held a rally on 6 June that started in front of the Université du Québec à Trois-Rivières before heading for the city hall.

=== Saskatchewan ===
- Prince Albert: On 6 June, a large crowd of protesters gathered at the city hall and held a moment of silence for eight minutes and forty-six seconds to honour George Floyd.
- Regina: Hundreds of protesters gathered at the Saskatchewan Legislature on 2 June. 5 June: Demonstrators were silent for 8:46 before singing Amazing Grace. Community organizers spoke and Regina Police Chief Evan Bray said "Black Lives Matter."
- Saskatoon: Hundreds rallied outside the Saskatoon City Hall, on 30 May. On 4 June, 2,000 people marched throughout various parts of downtown. The aim was to remain peaceful. A third rally planned for 20 June by Black Lives Matter YXE Movement said in a statement that they didn't want police presence (uniformed or in plainclothes), but they are welcome to march.

=== Yukon ===
- Dawson City: On Front Street, at least 100 people held a rally on 6 June denouncing both anti-black and anti-indigenous racism.
- Whitehorse: Downtown, hundreds of people held a rally on 6 June denouncing both anti-black and anti-indigenous racism.
