= Centrepointe =

- Neighbourhood
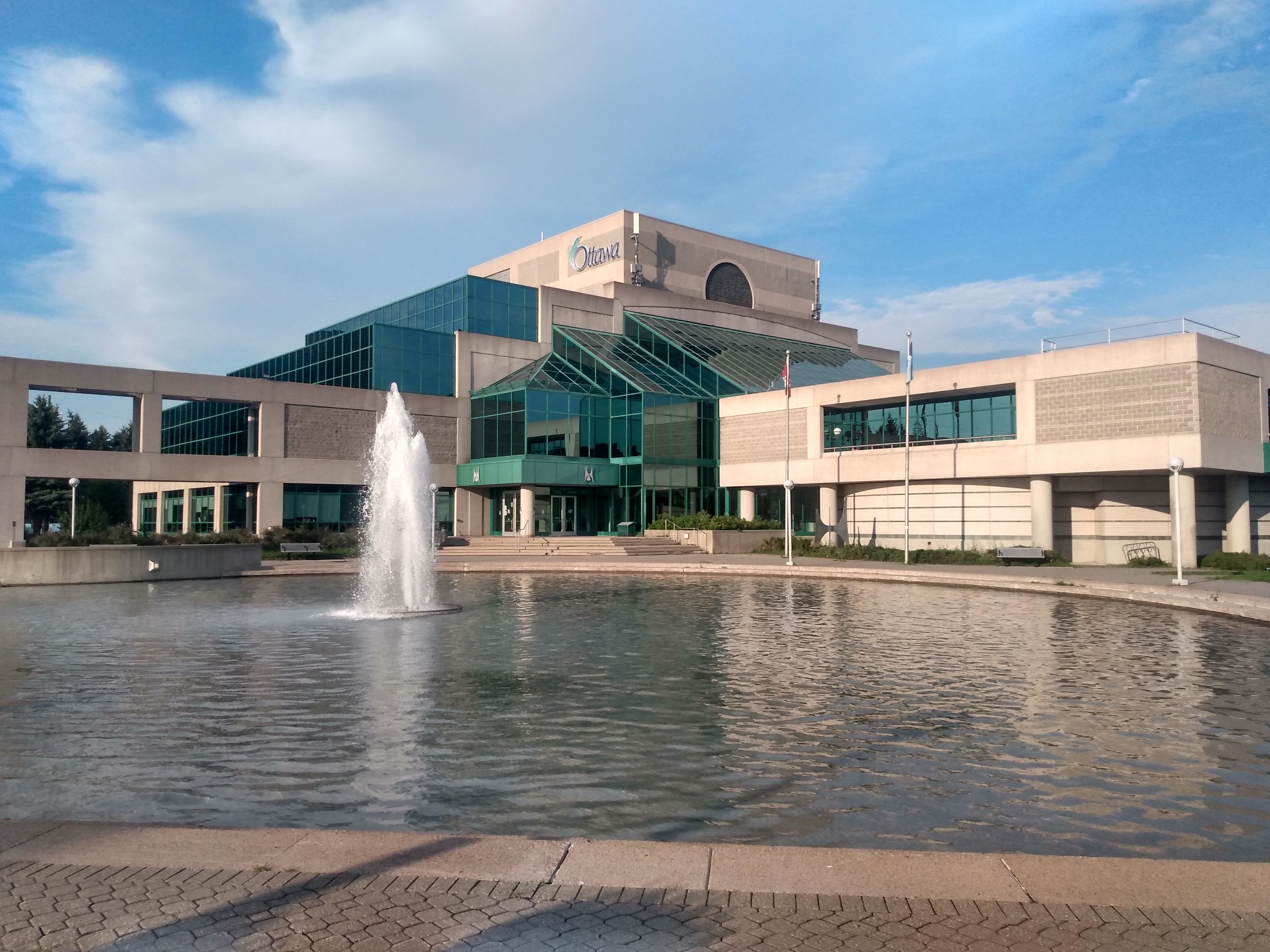
- Fountain at Ben Franklin Place

- Location within Ottawa
- Coordinates: 45.34261°N 75.76810°W
- Country: Canada
- Province: Ontario
- City: Ottawa

Government
  - MPs: Anita Vandenbeld
  - MPPs: Chandra Pasma
  - Councillors: Laine Johnson
  - Governing body: Centrepointe Community Association
  - President: Ron Benn

Area
  - Total: 2.07 km^{2} (0.80 sq mi)
- Elevation: 85 m (279 ft)

Population (Canada 2016 Census)
  - Total: 7,245
  - Density: 3,500/km^{2} (9,060/sq mi)
- Time zone: Eastern (EST)
- Forward sortation area: K2G
- Website: Community Association

Centrepointe is a neighbourhood in College Ward in the urban west end of the city of Ottawa, Ontario, Canada. It was formerly part of the city of Nepean. It is a residential subdivision in the west/central part of Ottawa, developed from 1984 onwards, and is informally bounded by Baseline Road to the north, Woodroffe Avenue to the east, the CN railroad to the south, and the Briargreen subdivision and Forest Ridge Apartments to the west. The housing stock includes approximately 1,000 detached homes, with the remainder mostly townhomes (row houses) and terrace homes.

According to the Canada 2016 Census, the neighbourhood had a total population of 7,245.

Census Tract
Year	Pop.	±%
1996	6,163	—
2001	7,144	+15.9%
2006	7,275	+1.8%
2011	7,523	+3.4%
2016	7,245	−3.7%

Previously farmland, it was purchased by the Canada Mortgage and Housing Corporation, which let the land lay fallow for many years. It had been intended to be developed as a demonstration model of an "ideal community". After facing budget cuts, CMHC sold the land, with most being sold off to Ottawa's largest housing developer Minto Group, which built and sold off a wide range of homes from townhouses to large upscale houses. The Nepean Housing Corporation has built and rents out affordable housing units in townhouses and one low-rise apartment building. The neighbourhood was built to be Nepean's "downtown", with including small strip-mall shops and restaurants, and offices and a civic square, to formally housed Nepean's city hall. The neighbourhood was built as a "self-contained community" and was projected to cost $700 million.

Its major attraction is Ben Franklin Place, named for the former mayor of Nepean, which houses the Centrepointe Branch of the Ottawa Public Library, the locally renowned Centrepointe Theatre, and the former Nepean City Hall (now housing satellite offices for the City of Ottawa).

The neighbourhood has a significant Jewish population. The 2011 National Household Survey indicated that 13% of the neighbourhood's population was Jewish.

The Centrepointe Community Association was formed on February 4, 2006 to represent and advance the interests of neighbourhood residents. A major issue confronting the association is the City of Ottawa's proposed development of the Centrepointe Town Centre concept, which could add up to two million square feet of high density residential and commercial space to the area. Residential construction in Centrepointe continues. In 2007, a former snow dump next to Centrepointe Park was converted into approximately 260 townhouses, terrace homes and low-rise apartments, which was completed in early 2011. The Centrepointe Community Association has not been very active as of late; however, it does advertise a community garage sale each spring.

The easternmost portion of Centrepointe underwent major development. As of January 2012, construction had finished on three major projects: the City of Ottawa Archives at the corner of Tallwood Drive and Woodroffe Avenue, a new trades building for nearby Algonquin College, and expansion of Centrepointe Theatre at Ben Franklin Place. Baseline Station Portions of Constellation Drive were rerouted to accommodate the new buildings and as part of the City's long-term public transportation plan.

As of 2024, two major apartment building projects are well underway in the north section of Centrepointe: a 2-tower (22 and 24 storeys) Richcraft condominium complex on the southwest corner at 19 Centrepointe Drive, and a 15-storey rental apartment building near the northeast corner of Constellation Drive (2140 Baseline Road).

Baseline station is expected to be the terminus of Stage 2 of the LRT's Line 1. Delayed several times, as of April 2024, it is now expected by OC Transpo to be completed in 2026 at the earliest.

Many school-aged children attend Briargreen, Manordale, Knoxdale (French Immersion), Greenbank Middle School (closed in 2017), and then Sir Robert Borden High School.

== Ethnic make up ==
Centrepointe has 2805, ethnic minorities per stats can 2016 census.

- 3.2% of Centrepointe residents do not speak English or French.
- 65.4% only speak English.
- 31.2% are bilingual.
- 43.9% of children speak a non-official language.
- 485 South Asians
- 1,285 Chinese
- 235 Blacks
- 30 Filipinos
- 60 Latin Americans
- 240 Arabs
- 145 South East Asians
- 65 West Asians
- 90 Koreans
- 40 Japanese
- 15 people defined as other.
- 105 indigenous people.

== Notable residents ==
- Jesse Levine (born 1987), US/Canadian tennis player
