= Ben Franklin Place =

Coordinates: 45.344474°N 75.762663°W

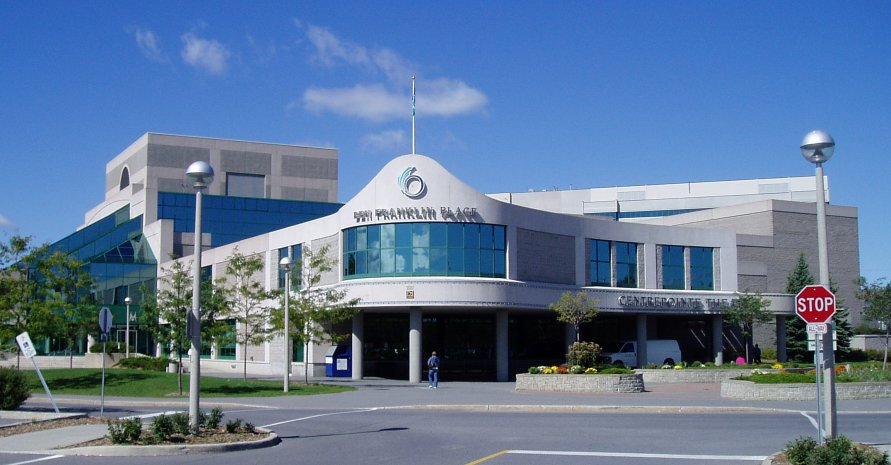
Ben Franklin Place

Ben Franklin Place is a building complex in the Centrepointe area of Ottawa which houses the Centrepointe Branch of the Ottawa Public Library, the Centrepointe Theatre, and a satellite office for the City of Ottawa. It also includes an outdoor skating rink. Ben Franklin Place also houses an Ottawa By-Law Enforcement Office and the West Bureau of Investigations and Prevention for the Ottawa Fire Service.

Built to house the former city of Nepean's city hall, the complex was named for the longest-serving mayor of Nepean, Ben Franklin.

The Royal Canadian Legion, Bells Corners Branch and the City of Nepean dedicated a granite War Memorial obelisk on Sunday, September 20, 1992, to those who made the supreme sacrifice, in many world conflicts.

The building also houses the offices for the city councillor for College Ward, currently Laine Johnson.

== History ==
Ben Franklin Place was built in 1980 for a cost $24 million.
