= Legal status of animals in Canada =

Animals in the Canadian legal system are considered property. Property rights include the rights of possession, the rights of use, and the enjoyment of property to the exclusion of humans. Jurisdiction over animals is divided between the federal government and the provinces under the Constitution of Canada. The federal government, using its criminal law power, has created offences in the Criminal Code, in relation to animal suffering, defining the limitations and penalties in the event of breaches. The federal Parliament also has jurisdiction over the import of animals. The provinces have jurisdiction over animals as part of their power to regulate property laws.

== Federal Criminal Code provisions ==
=== Current provisions ===
Provisions for animal cruelty were originally enacted in 1892. Cattle and other working animals have more protection than other species. In general, owned animals also have more protection than unowned animals. Crimes of neglect are rarely prosecuted because of the term "wilful neglect", which is difficult to prove. There is no provision for training animals to fight other animals, nor for receiving money from animal fights. Law enforcement animals have no special protection.

The Criminal Code makes the deliberate killing, wounding, maiming, injuring, or poisoning of an animal as well as acts of deliberate cruelty can result in a prison sentence of up to 5 years or a fine of up to $10,000. A prison sentence of up to 18 months may also accompany a fine. Specific acts of cruelty detailed in the code are: causing unnecessary pain or suffering, administering or allowing the administration of a poisonous substance or drug, and participating in the freeing of captured birds to be shot on liberation. Persons who allow their property to be used for any of the above activities may also be charged, unless there is sufficient evidence that they were unaware of how their property was used. Failure to exercise reasonable care to prevent the suffering of an animal also counts as wilfully allowing the suffering.

=== Attempts at reform ===
In 1999, the Government of Canada began gathering input on what changes were needed to update the provisions. Then Justice Minister Anne McLellan tabled Bill C-17 in December of that year, but the bill died due to the election call of early 2000. Over the next five years, the Liberal government repeatedly retabled the bill as it died again due to repeated prorogations. The bill nearly passed in 2003 as Bill C-10B, with the support of all parties, but was blocked by the Senate.

When the Conservative Party came to power in 2006, MP Mark Holland tabled a private member’s bill that was virtually identical to Bill C-50, the most recent incarnation of C-17. Holland also retabled his bill repeatedly as it died with prorogation. The New Democratic Party also tabled its own version of the bill, C-558, in June 2008.

In February 2005, Liberal Senator John Bryden tabled Bill S-24. Animal groups like the Canadian Federation of Humane Societies strongly opposed this bill with the support of a petition, containing almost 112,000 signatures from the Canadian public. While S-24 did increase the penalties for misconduct (the penalties section was taken from the Liberal government bill that had not yet passed), it fell short of much-needed updates to the list of offences. Bryden had to retable the bill as, like the others, it repeatedly died due to prorogation. Bryden's bill ultimately passed through the Senate and House of Commons of Canada as Bill S-203, enacted in June 2008.

=== Bill C-229 (40th Parliament of Canada, 1st Session) ===
In 2009, Mark Holland tabled Bill C-229, which was supported by both animal protection groups and most animal use industries. This bill would update many of the archaic offenses that had not changed substantially since 1892. If passed, this bill would have updated the wording of the current Criminal Code as it deals with animal cruelty in order to more effectively identify misconduct. Animal cruelty would no longer have been considered a property offence. It would have protected all animals equally, regardless of species and whether or not they were owned. The term "wilful neglect" would have been replaced with "negligent". There would have been new provisions for killing an animal in a particularly brutal or vicious manner, training animals to fight or receiving money for animal fights, and special protection for law enforcement animals. The bill would have maintained protection for lawful animal use activities such as farming, hunting, fishing, and scientific research. The bill was not passed. Efforts are now being made at the provincial level to elevate the status of animals from property to sentient (i.e., feeling) beings.

=== Bill C-246 (42nd Parliament, 1st Session) ===
On February 26, 2016, MP Nathaniel Erskine-Smith introduced Bill C-246, as a private member’s bill, titled The Modernizing Animal Protection Act. The bill was supported by major animal welfare organizations across North America. If passed, it proposed to amend key pieces of legislation including the Criminal Code and The Fisheries Act. This included the ban on the importation of shark fins, requiring labelling for fur products in Canada, and banned the importation and sale of cat and dog fur. The bill also proposed to strengthen the language in criminal laws against animal cruelty, by prohibiting training and breeding animals for fighting and make it easier for prosecuting criminal neglect of animal welfare.

The bill was defeated on Oct. 5, 2016, at the second reading. It was opposed by organizations such as The Ontario Federation of Anglers and Hunters who lobbied against the bill. Bill C-246 was last introduced in the 42nd Parliament, 1st Session, which ended in September 2019.

Despite the bill being defeated, Erskine-Smith stated “If I can see the silver lining in all of this it’s that thousands, if not millions of Canadians spoke up and showed they cared about improving our animal protection laws. The government is committed to taking action because of that overwhelming response,” he says. “It wasn’t a victory for Bill C-246, but that is a victory for animals.”

== Federal Import regulations ==
The Health of Animals Regulations must be followed for all animals in human care while in Canada. Endangered species are subject to additional controls by the Convention on International Trade in Endangered Species of Wild Fauna and Flora. In Canada, these controls are administered by the Canadian Wildlife Service. Environment and human health analysis may also be required under the Canadian Environmental Protection Act before importation is permitted.

=== Amphibians and reptiles ===
There are no regulations on the imports of reptiles and amphibians, except for turtles and tortoises, which require an import permit from the Canadian Food Inspection Agency. Pet turtles and tortoises must have been in the owner’s possession in the country of origin and must accompany the owner into Canada. Permits for turtle and tortoise eggs are only issued to zoos and research laboratories.

=== Birds ===
Pet birds imported from the United States must accompany the owner or an immediately family member into Canada. They must be found to be healthy when inspected at the place of entry and have been in the owner’s possession for 90 days preceding the importation, during which they cannot have been in contact with any other birds. If the bird is less than three days old, the owner must have been in possession of its mother and father for the preceding 90 days and both birds must have the same health status. The birds must also be pets, not intended for re-sale. Finally, neither the owner nor any member of their family may have imported birds into Canada under the pet bird provision during the preceding 90 days.

Importation of birds from countries in which highly pathogenic avian flu is endemic (Bangladesh, China, Egypt, India, Indonesia, Vietnam) is prohibited. Importation from other countries requires a CFIA permit.

=== Cats ===
Domestic cats aged 3 months or older from a country recognized by Canada as free of rabies must be accompanied by a rabies vaccination certificate or a veterinary certificate declaring that country of origin is rabies-free. Cats from a country not so recognized must be accompanied by a vaccination certificate. Without a certificate, the owner must have their cat vaccinated and provide a record of the vaccination to a CFIA office.

=== Dogs ===
Regulations for domestic dogs vary with the age of the dog and whether the country of origin is recognized by Canada as rabies-free. In general, dogs must be accompanied by a certification of rabies vaccination or that the country of origin is rabies-free.

=== Aquatic animals ===
Aquatic animals such as fish, crustaceans, and molluscs must be declared. If the animal is on the Susceptible Species of Aquatic Animals list and cannot be exempt (for example, if the owner can attest that the animal will not come into contact with other aquatic species other than those kept in the household), a permit is required.

=== Rodents ===
Rodents do not require a permit except for prairie dogs, Gambian pouched rats, squirrels, or rodents from Africa. Permits are also required for rats in Alberta.

=== Horses ===
Horses may be imported from the United States with an export certificate from the United States Department of Agriculture.

=== Rabbits ===
Pet rabbits from countries other than the United States require a permit.

=== Primates ===
In general, owning primates as pets in Canada is largely restricted, and specific regulations vary by province. While some provinces may have exceptions for specific primate species or in specific circumstances (like breeding programs or research), the broad trend is towards restrictions or prohibitions on keeping primates as pets

== Provincial regulation ==
=== Quebec ===
In 2015, Pierre Paradis, the Minister of Agriculture, Fisheries and Food in the government of Quebec, introduced Bill 54 in the National Assembly. The purpose of the bill was to amend the Civil Code to provide that animals are not "things" but sentient beings, to implement the Act to improve the legal situation of animals, and to provide for jail time for animal cruelty. In the Assembly, Paradis explained that the bill would bring Quebec's laws into line with British Columbia, Manitoba and Ontario, which have some of the strongest animal protection laws in Canada. He also emphasized the need for anyone who is responsible for animals, whether domesticated or farm animals, to take proper care of them. He indicated that the bill was to end Quebec's reputation as a haven for "puppy mills".

Following public consultations, the bill was passed unanimously by the National Assembly in December, 2015. While animal protection groups welcomed the legislation, they have subsequently stated that the government's enforcement of the law has been lax.

== See also ==
- Animal welfare
