= Centrepointe Theatre =

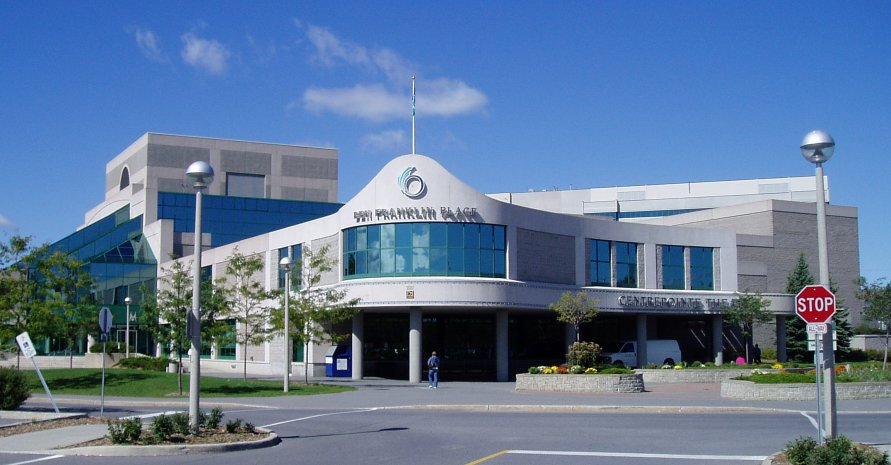
- Ben Franklin Place
- Interactive map of Centrepointe Theatre
- Full name: Meridian Theatres @ Centrepointe
- Address: 101 Centrepointe Drive
- Location: Ottawa, Ontario, Canada
- Coordinates: 45.343881°N 75.762405°W
- Capacity: Main Stage: 954; Les Lye Studio: 199 - 234

Construction
- Opened: May 3, 1988

Website
- www.meridiancentrepointe.com

Centrepointe Theatre stylized as Meridian Theatres @ Centrepointe, are publicly owned performance halls located in the former city of Nepean in Ottawa, Ontario, Canada. The building originally opened in 1988 with a 954-seat mainstage theatre and added a smaller studio theatre in February 2011. In 2018, Meridian Credit Union entered into a fifteen-year naming rights agreement with the City of Ottawa. The studio theatre was renamed the Les Lye Studio Theatre in 2019.

== Theatre ==
The building has two performance theatres - a 954-seat mainstage and the 199 - 234-seat Les Lye studio theatre. Genres presented include musical theatre, theatre, dance, comedy and music. In addition to community theatre groups, the theatre rents performance space to commercial presenters and other organizations.

The theatre employs a full-time manager and other support staff, and has a regular company of volunteers who serve as ushers and stage crew, for events presented by non-profit organizations. Stage crew for other events are provided by the International Alliance of Stage and Theatrical Employees IATSE.

The theatre is located in the Ben Franklin Place civic complex at Baseline Road and Woodroffe Avenue. It is located near Baseline station on the Transitway and near the Queensway (Highway 417) highway.

== History ==
Originally a project of the City of Nepean, the 954-seat mainstage theatre opened on May 3, 1988. The theatre became an asset of the City of Ottawa after Nepean was amalgamated into Ottawa in 2001. The 199 - 234-seat studio theatre opened in February 2011. On September 27, 2019, a ceremony was held to name the studio theatre after the beloved local actor and broadcaster Les Lye.

A CA$5 million dollar expansion of the theatre had been planned in 2002, largely funded by a ticket surcharge, but in 2005 these plans were set aside in favour of a "Capital Renewal" fund for replacement of existing facility elements such as sound and lighting equipment.

On August 21, 2018, Centrepointe Theatres was officially renamed Meridian Theatres @ Centrepointe as part of a fifteen-year naming rights agreement between the City of Ottawa and Meridian Credit Union.

=== Performances ===
The Orpheus Musical Theatre Society, the Savoy Society of Ottawa, the Capital City Chorus and other community groups have sustained the theatre with hundreds of performances since its opening. Numerous touring performers have graced its stages including Paul Potts, Russell Peters, Dave and Ian Thomas, Jeff Healey, David Clayton-Thomas, Sarah McLachlan, Bruce Cockburn, Blue Rodeo, The Barenaked Ladies, The Kids in the Hall, The Rankin Family, Leahy, Lyle Lovett, and the Moscow Philharmonic Orchestra.
