= Orpheus Musical Theatre Society =

The Orpheus Musical Theatre Society is an amateur musical theatre society, based in Ottawa, Ontario, which was founded in 1906.

Orpheus performs three shows annually at the Centrepointe Theatre in Ottawa, Ontario.

== Arms ==
Coat of arms of Orpheus Musical Theatre Society
Notes 15 August 2006. Crest A mask of tragedy and a mask of comedy Or their ribbons Azure. Escutcheon Azure a lyre Or. Supporters Two song-birds Or standing on a stage set with footlights Proper. Motto Music Enriches
