= Ottawa Police Service =

Police agency of Ottawa, Ontario, Canada

Ottawa Police Service Service de police d'Ottawa (French)
- Abbreviation: OPS
- Motto: Community Service Communautaire

Agency overview
- Formed: 1855 (original); 2001 (current OPS)
- Annual budget: $373.0 million (2024)

Jurisdictional structure
- Operations jurisdiction: Ottawa
- Legal jurisdiction: As per operations jurisdiction
- Governing body: Ottawa Police Services Board
- Constituting instrument: Community Safety and Policing Act, 2019 (SO 2019, c. 1, Sched. 1)
- General nature: Local civilian police

Operational structure
- Headquarters: 474 Elgin Street, Ottawa, Ontario, Canada
- Sworn members: 1,615 (2024)
- Unsworn members: 646 (2024)
- Elected officer responsible: Michael Kerzner, Solicitor General of Ontario
- Agency executive: Eric Stubbs, Chief of Police
- Parent agency: City of Ottawa

Facilities
- Stations: 5
- Community Police Centers: 5

Website
- www.ottawapolice.ca

The Ottawa Police Service (OPS; French: Service de police d'Ottawa) is the municipal police service of Ottawa, Ontario, Canada, as well as most of the north east Ontario side of the National Capital Region. As of 2024, this police service has employed 1,615 officers and 646 non-uniformed staff, and serves an area of 2,790 square kilometres and 1,017,449 (2021 census) civilians, alongside several other police forces which have specialized jurisdiction. Formally established in 1855, this police service gradually absorbed the police forces of other neighbouring municipalities as Ottawa itself expanded, and experienced multiple mergings and reforms in the process; the present OPS was established in 2001.

== History ==
=== Early history (1847–1968) ===
The first law enforcement agency in Ottawa was the Bytown Association for the Preservation of the Public Peace, formed in 1847. In 1855, after Bytown was incorporated and renamed to Ottawa, Roderick Ross was appointed the first chief constable, supervising a force of approximately 17 constables. Early law enforcement in Ottawa was reportedly difficult: constables often dealt with rampant public intoxication and alcohol abuse; instead of a proper salary, constables were paid $1 for each apprehension and call response; and political influence frequently interfered with the Peelian principles the police were meant to follow. The dysfunction of early policing in Ottawa prompted reform in the 1860s: in 1863, the Board of Commission of Police (later the Ottawa Police Services Board) was formed to oversee police activities and prevent police corruption, and a new chief of police was appointed with baton-armed officers, though they still lacked uniforms and salaries. In 1865, the Ottawa Police was formalized as a police service with uniforms and proper salaries.

Over the years, the Ottawa Police gradually advanced with technology and society, fielding armed police in 1867; horse-drawn paddy wagons in 1893; bicycle patrols in 1896; a mounted unit in 1905; police cars in 1912; a 24/7 emergency line in the 1930s; and police radios in 1935. In 1913, the OPS hired Flora Ann Campbell, their first female constable, though she was unarmed and assigned to juvenile duties, probation, overseeing women accused of crimes, and conflict resolution, instead of the regular patrol duties reserved for male constables. In 1915, a code of conduct was formalized. In 1945, the Ottawa Police School was established as a police academy to train recruits; previously, Ottawa Police constables only received field training. It was succeeded by the Ontario Police College in 1959. In 1951, the Ottawa Police Association, the Ottawa Police's union, was formed.

=== Mergers and Ottawa–Carleton Regional Police Service (1969–2000) ===
As Ottawa and the Ottawa Police grew, neighbouring municipalities did as well, and some formed their police forces. The Eastview Police was formed in 1913, and was suitably renamed when Eastview became Vanier in 1969. In 1957, Gloucester and Nepean formed the shared Gloucester-Nepean Police Department, which was later split into the separate Gloucester Police Service and Nepean Police Service in 1964. Other municipalities with close ties to Ottawa—namely Cumberland, Kanata, Manotick, Rockcliffe Park, and West Carleton Township—has their own Ontario Provincial Police detachments as well. By the formation of Ottawa–Carleton Region in 1969, the possibility arose to merge all police forces in the Region into a single unified service, and expand the new police service's jurisdiction to take over for the OPP. These mergers began in 1984, when the Ottawa Police absorbed the Vanier Police on December 31; Vanier remained a separate city until 2001, and most Vanier Police constables "patched over" to continue patrolling their jurisdiction, making the merger largely a visual and administrative change.

On January 1, 1995, the Ottawa Police absorbed the Nepean Police Service, Gloucester Police Service, and the jurisdictions of the aforementioned municipalities with OPP detachments, to be reformed as the Ottawa–Carleton Regional Police Service (OCRPS). However, the new service was immediately plagued by major controversies, severe dysfunction, and poor morale: the Ottawa Citizen reported in May 1995 that in the span of just 18 weeks, Regional Chief Brian Ford was accused of misusing sick leave funds; Jamaican Canadian activist Ralph Kirkland accused the OCRPS of racism over a minor arrest, prompting "secret negotiations" to drop the charges; a judge deemed a weapons arrest by two constables illegal and accused them of police brutality; Wayne Johnson, a Black Canadian, drowned in the Rideau River while fleeing constables in controversial circumstances, which led to one investigated constable committing suicide due to a lack of support; two constables were shot and wounded responding to a robbery, which was blamed on outdated service weapons and low manpower; and eight homicides had already occurred (the same amount for all of 1994), with one victim having called the police three times with no response before she was killed. Even before the OCRPS's establishment, surveys in fall 1994 indicated 74% of Ottawa Police constables believed morale was low and 82% of Nepean Police constables were disillusioned with their jobs. Ford was quoted as saying, "I've never seen three months like this in all my 30 years of policing. It's one crisis after the next. I've never seen anything like this. Never."

=== Modern history (2001–present) ===
On January 1, 2001, Ottawa–Carleton Region's constituent municipalities were amalgamated into the City of Ottawa, and the OCRPS was reformed as the Ottawa Police Service. Throughout Ottawa's history, the police forces had 14 officers died in the line of duty.

== Policing philosophy ==
The OPS takes a community-oriented approach to policing. The Neighbourhood Resource Team (NRT) program was created to deploy frontline constables into high-crime and high-traffic areas. After the closure of the OPS school resource officer program, NRT gained a new youth subdivision intended to engage with at-risk youth outside of the education system. The PIVOT team works to combat guns and gangs within Ottawa through a strategic deployment to certain communities.

Frontline OPS constables are expected to prioritize community interaction, which is a different approach from traditional law enforcement. Community policing is displayed in many OPS units. Frontline and NRT constables are expected to make connections with citizens and businesses in the areas they serve. This, in turn, creates a more trusting environment all around. The OPS was the first police service in Canada to include a Hate Crimes investigative branch.

== Organization ==
The current chief of police is Eric Stubbs.

Rank	Commanding officers		Senior officers		Police officers						
Rank	Chief of police	Deputy chief of police	Superintendent	Inspector	Staff sergeant	Sergeant	First class constable	Second class constable	Third class constable	Fourth class constable	Special constable
Insignia (slip-on)											
Insignia (shoulder board)					Shoulder boards not used for these ranks						

The rank of senior constable is no longer awarded; however, the rank is still in effect until the last senior constable retires. To have become a senior constable, an officer had to have had ten years' service and have completed the sergeant's promotional exam.

With very rare exceptions, all police officers receive their three-month police training and basic constable diplomas at the Ontario Police College in Aylmer. New police recruits are hired as 4th-class constables, and without any training or discipline issues, can expect to reach the rank of 1st-class constable within 5 years. A 1st class constable has a base salary pretax of approximately $96,000, not including overtime and off-duty court time. This pay rate is the norm compared to other police services found within Ontario, and generally, the Ottawa Police Service falls within the top five highest-paid services in the province. In 2024, Constable Daniel Montsion was paid just above $450,000 as the second highest paid employee in Ottawa. The OPS also maintains a Ceremonial Guard to attend the many community events and parades that occur in Ottawa as a representative of the police service, and the Ottawa Police Service Pipe Band, which competes every season in the Ontario pipe band circuit, most notably finishing as Ontario Championship Supreme in grade 2 in 2012.

== Inter-agency relationships ==
Security services at Parliament Hill and the parliamentary district in Ottawa are handled by the Parliamentary Protective Service (PPS) and Royal Canadian Mounted Police (RCMP), not the OPS. The RCMP generally does not play a role in municipal police operations in Ottawa, except federal land managed by the National Capital Commission. Under federal and provincial law, the RCMP has jurisdiction over the entire city but maintains a mandate of diplomatic engagements, federal land, and carriage rides.

The Ontario Provincial Police patrol Ottawa's main provincial highways (Highway 416 and the Queensway). The Canadian Forces deploy their own military police to patrol Department of National Defence property in Ottawa (National Defence Headquarters (Canada), NDHQ Carling, CFS Leitrim and Connaught Cadet Training Centre). This police force provides law enforcement services at Ottawa Macdonald–Cartier International Airport and is also authorized to act on behalf of the Ottawa Macdonald–Cartier International Airport Authority for providing certain security services. Before the 1997 semi-privatization of Class 1 Canadian airports, these services were provided by the RCMP to Transport Canada.

In April 2007, the Ottawa Police Services Board granted special constable status to transit law enforcement officers employed by OC Transpo. The OPS works in partnership with transit special constables who provide many frontline supplemental police services in cooperation with the Ottawa Police. In the same way, some of the safety personnel of Carleton University are sworn as special constables and hold limited police powers on campus grounds.

== Operations ==
The OPS has 5 police stations, which largely operate as typical police stations but with more focus on serving as police workplaces; and 19 Community Police Centres, which are community-oriented substations typically located in central areas and community centre.

=== Patrol Operations ===
- West Division — Responsible for regions of Ottawa west of the Rideau River (e.g. Kanata, Nepean, Stittsville, West Carleton).
- Central Division — Responsible for central Ottawa and Downtown (e.g. Centretown, Westboro, Vanier).
- East Division — Responsible for regions of Ottawa east of the Rideau River (e.g. Orleans, Gloucester, Riverside South, Greely).

=== Criminal Investigative Services ===
- Arson Unit — Investigates arsons and suspicious fires in cooperation with the Ottawa Fire Services and Ontario Office of the Fire Marshal.
- Collision Investigation Unit — Investigates traffic collision that are not fatal but may be serious or in dispute.
- Fatal Collision Investigation Unit — Investigates fatal traffic collisions and handles collision reconstruction, technical analyses, calculations, and evidence examination where necessary.
- Digital Forensics Unit — Investigates cybercrime, hacking, network intrusion, child pornography distribution, serious cyberbullying, and other computer-related crimes that do not primarily fall under the mandate of other units. Also provides computer forensics, online tracing, and technical support services to other units.
- Drug Unit — Enforces narcotic laws, prevents the illegal production of prescription drugs and acquisition of precursor chemicals, and investigates and counters drug trafficking, smuggling, and drug-related organized crime.
- Elder Abuse Section — Investigates elder abuse and domestic violence involving elderly individuals.
- Forensic Identification Section — Handles forensics, crime scene investigation, evidence and body handling and analyses, and DNA databank maintenance.
- Guns and Gangs Unit — The gang intelligence unit and anti-arms trafficking unit of the OPS. Counters the activities of existing gangs and works to prevent further membership through interventions and social prevention. Under Guns and Gangs is Prevention and Intervention of Violence in Ottawa (PIVOT), formerly the Direct Action Response Team (DART), which works to directly intervene against gangs and patrol communities with a notable gang presence.
- Hate and Bias Crime Unit — Investigates hate crimes.
- Homicide Unit — Investigates homicides, suspicious deaths, found human remains, and cold cases.
- Human Trafficking Unit — Investigates and counters human trafficking.
- Intimate Partner Violence Unit — Investigates domestic violence and abuse.
- Robbery Unit — Investigates all types of robberies.
- Sexual Assault and Child Abuse Section — Investigates sexual assault, child abuse, and child pornography.
- Organized Auto Theft — Investigates motor vehicle theft and vehicle break-ins.
- Organized Fraud Section — Investigates all kinds of fraud.

=== Support Services ===
- Communications Centre — Handles police dispatching and 911 service for the Ottawa area.
- Police Reporting Unit — Takes and handles police reports, and handles calls for service where constables do not need to be dispatched, primarily by phone.
- Evidence Control Unit — Handles evidence, stolen property, and items in police custody.
- Mental Health Crisis Unit — Provides urgent mental health support in mental health crisis incidents, in cooperation with The Ottawa Hospital's Mobile Crisis Team.
- Adult Pre-Charge Diversion Unit — Guides individuals with minor criminal offences away from the criminal justice system and toward rehabilitation via restorative justice, community organization support, and addressing root problems that lead to crime and worse offences.
- Victim Support Unit — Provides support, services, assessments, and counselling to victims of crimes.
- Impounded Vehicles Section — Manages police vehicle impoundment and towing. Organized under the Traffic Services Unit.

=== Emergency Operations ===
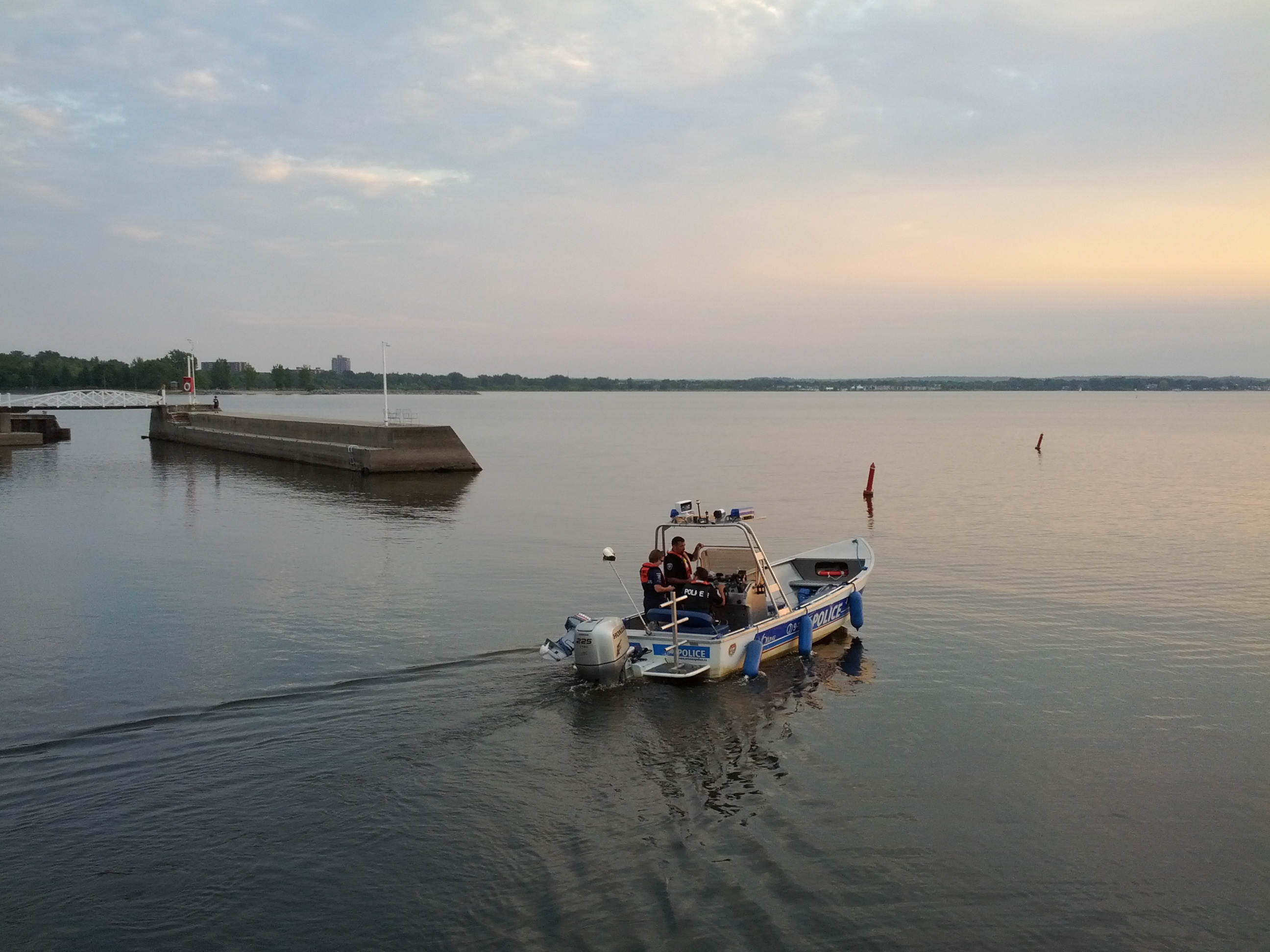
Ottawa Police Service Underwater Search and Recovery Unit at the Britannia Yacht Club in 2012.

- Tactical Unit — The police tactical unit of the OPS. Handles high-risk and high-profile situations that regular constables are not trained or equipped to effectively and safely resolve.
- Traffic Services Unit — The traffic police and road patrol unit of the OPS. Provides basic traffic enforcement and road policing, and handles operations such as police escorts, parades, road closures, police checkpoints, and special traffic enforcement projects.
- Canine Unit — Maintains and provides police dog services. As of 2024, the OPS has 13 police dogs.
- Emergency Services Unit — Handles planned and unplanned large-scale events such as large-scale searches for missing persons and evidence, crowd management, and mass casualty incidents. Divided into multiple other units for specific incidents, including the Public Order Unit for crowd control and the CBRNe Task Force for chemical, biological, radiological, nuclear, and explosive crises.
- Marine, Dive and Trails Unit — Provides marine policing services in Ottawa's waterways, as well as policing in remote areas such as trails that are not accessible to regular vehicles and underequipped constables.
- Underwater Search and Recovery Unit — Provides underwater search and recovery services in cooperation with the Marine, Dive, and Trails Unit.
- Airport Policing Section — Provides airport police services at Ottawa Macdonald–Cartier International Airport.

=== Corporate/Executive Services ===
- Media Relations — Communicates with news media, maintains the OPS's image in the public eye, and facilitates cooperation between the media and police.
- Diversity Resource and Race Relations Unit — Ensures the OPS upholds fair and equitable policing and maintains its public image in race relations.
- Professional Standards Section — Ensures the OPS maintains and upholds their professional standards and conduct.

== Fleet ==
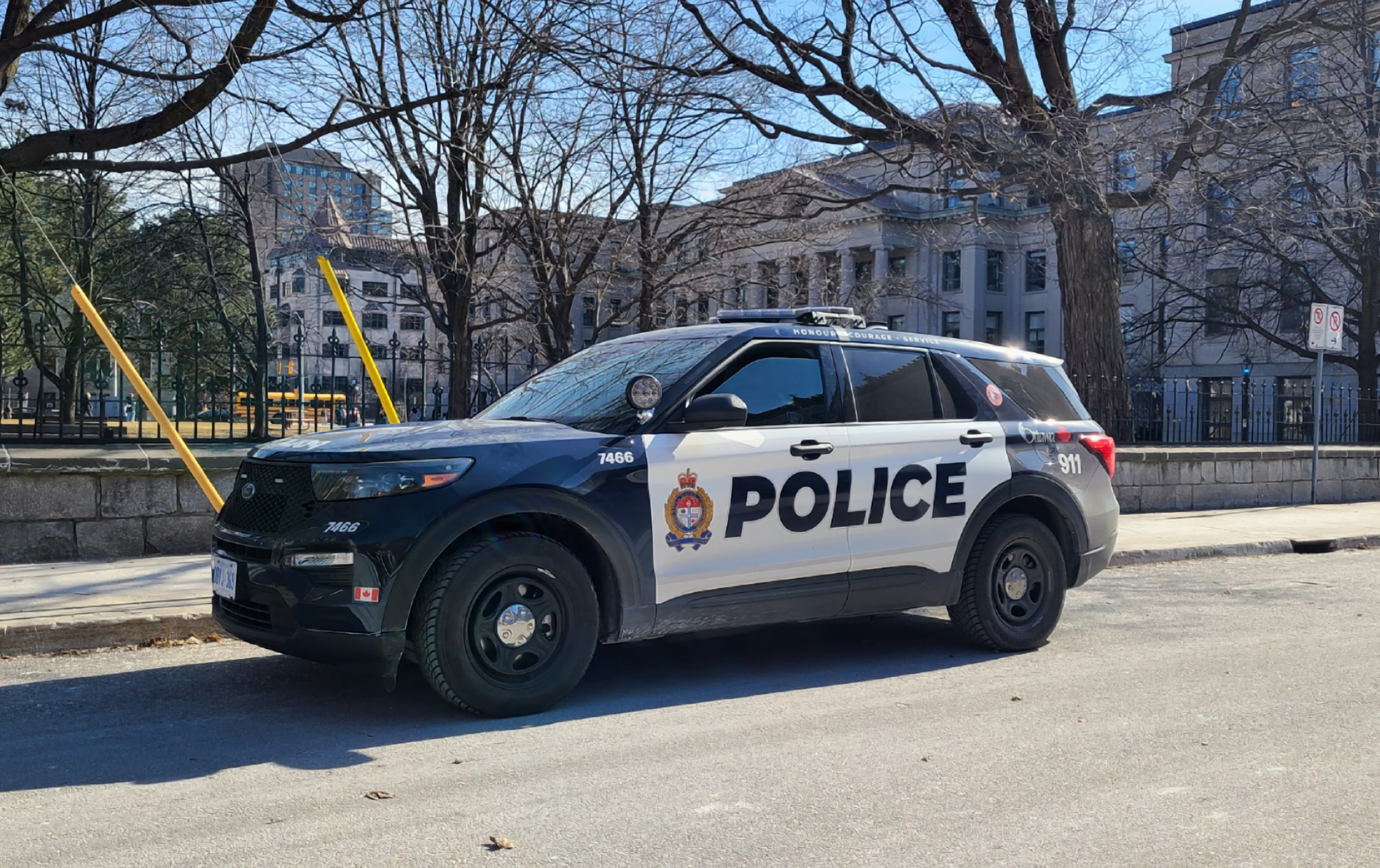
An OPS Ford Police Interceptor Utility near the University of Ottawa

Throughout the 20th century, the Ottawa Police Service and other neighbouring police services used a variety of vehicles, such as the Chevrolet Caprice. The first motor vehicle used by the Ottawa Police in 1912 was the Ford Model T.

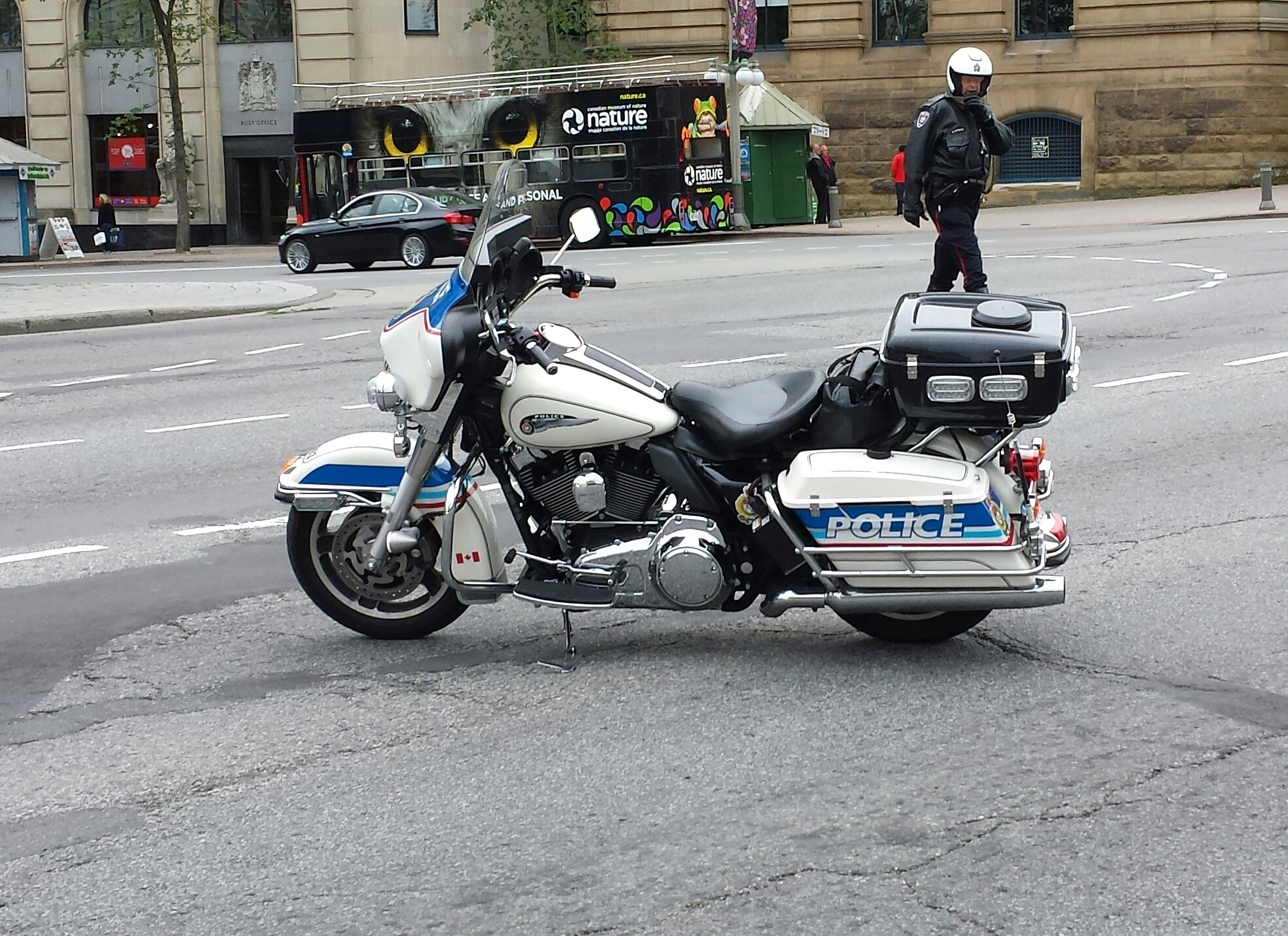
An OPS Harley-Davidson FLHP

By the 2001 amalgamation, the majority of marked patrol vehicles deployed by the OPS were the Ford Crown Victoria Police Interceptor and Chevrolet Impala 9C1. Following the CVPI's discontinuation in 2011, the OPS purchased Ford Police Interceptor Sedan (FPIS) and Ford Police Interceptor Utility (FPIU) vehicles to replace it. The FPIS became the new majority of marked patrol vehicles in the fleet until it was discontinued in 2019; since then, most FPIS vehicles in the fleet have been retired and replaced by newer FPIUs.

In February 2021, the Ottawa Police Services Board discussed the possibility of using electric police cars. In summer 2022, the OPS tested Dodge Durango and Dodge Charger police vehicles.

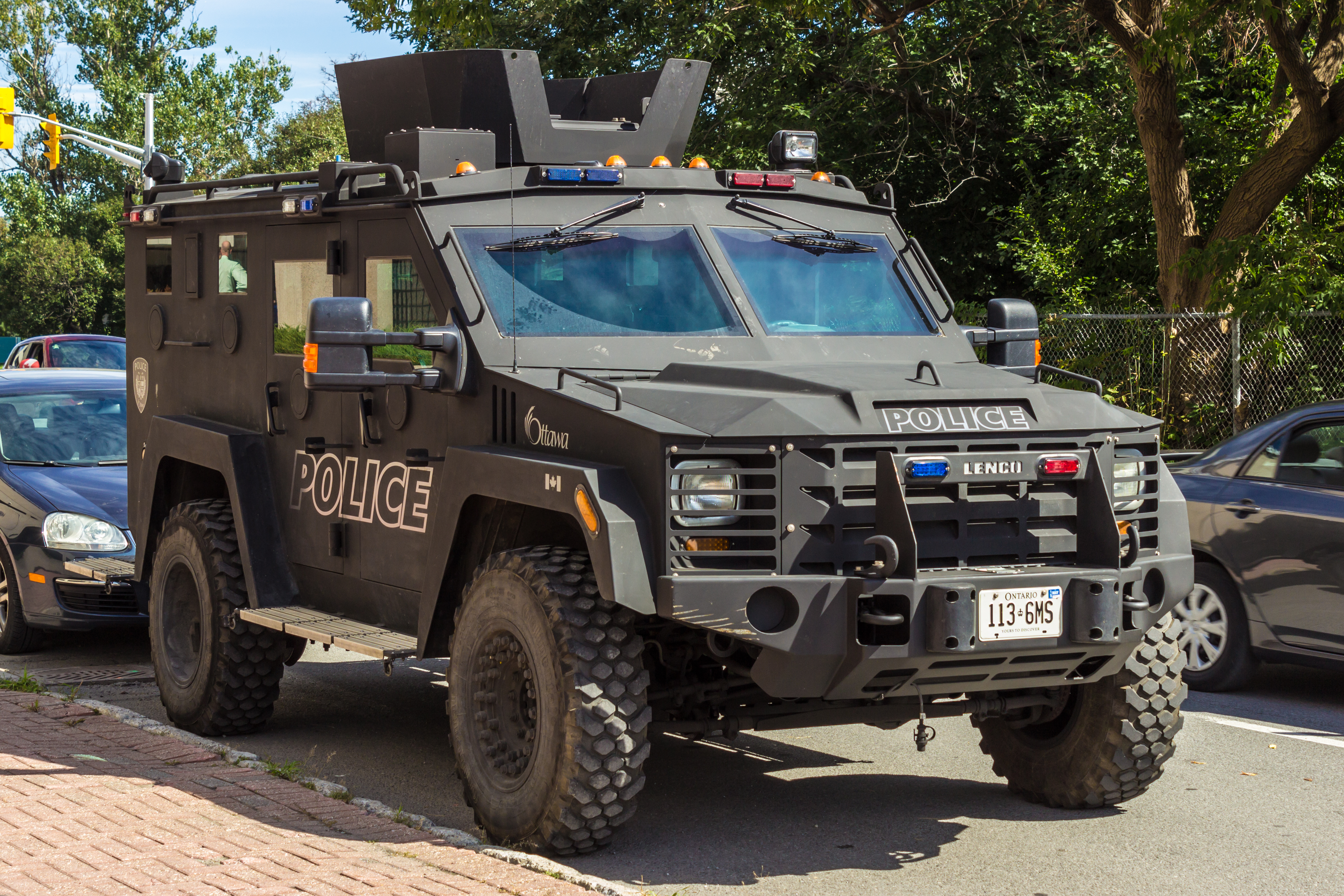
An OPS Lenco BearCat G3 used by the tactical unit

Vehicles used by the Tactical Unit include the Ford Expedition and the Lenco BearCat.

The OPS has one fixed wing aircraft, a Cessna 206 and various marine vehicles that patrol Ottawa waterways in the summer.

Ottawa Police Service fleet
Vehicle	Quantity
2020 Ford Police Interceptor Utility	>100
2016 Ford Police Interceptor Utility	>100
Ford Taurus (paid duty)	58
Ford Crown Victoria (patrol)	<10
Ford Crown Victoria (non-patrol)	18
Chevrolet Impala	<10
Other sedans	148
Vans	49
SUVs/trucks	38
Boats	5
Motorcycles	29
Snowmobiles	4
ATVs	4
Trailers	16
Specialty vehicles	6
Prisoner transport	3
Dodge Charger	1
Ford Expedition	
Total	554

== Equipment ==
- Glock 22
- Colt Canada C7 and C8
- Remington 870
- Mossberg 500
- Taser X26, X2 Defender, and 7
- Batons
- Pepper spray
- Handcuffs
- Tourniquet
- Radio
- First aid kit
- Automated external defibrillator
- Naloxone

== Controversies ==
On March 20, 1995, Wayne Johnson, a Black Canadian, drowned in the Rideau River after being pepper-sprayed by pursuing OCRPS constables. Police launched a search for Johnson, but reportedly could not find him and called off the search after five days; shortly after, Johnson's friends located his body three meters from where he was last seen. As the Ottawa Citizen reported, "To the black community, it looked as though the police search had been a farce." Police spokesman Dave Pepper denied the claims and, about that and other issues plaguing the OCRPS at the time, considered it bad luck. On May 9, Constable Shawn Wilson, one of the constables being investigated about the incident, committed suicide; his family blamed it on the lack of support and care he received from administration, and prohibited any OCRPS constables above the rank of staff sergeant from attending his funeral.

In June 2020, Chief Peter Sloly announced that Constable James Ramsay had been charged with distributing a racist meme image within the OPS that depicted 13 racialized constables with the caption "Ottawa Police Services – We're always hiring…anyone." Sloly learned of the meme around April and stated in a virtual meeting with the Ottawa Police Services Board that the meme targeted racialized members of the service. Rasmay was temporarily demoted from first class to second class constable for 9 months and was ordered to participate in a healing circle.

In September 2020, Ontario Court Justice Peter K. Doody found that the OPS had "a pattern of systemic failure" towards respecting the right to counsel guaranteed by Section 10 of the Charter of Rights and Freedoms after a defense lawyer presented him with 15 cases over the previous three years – not including the case in question and a subsequently reported case – of the OPS failing to advise detainees of that right.

In February 2022, Sloly resigned from the OPS amid controversy over his handling of the Canada convoy protest, which led the OPP and RMCP to take temporary management over the OPS and establish a command centre in Ottawa. On February 16, 2022, Steve Bell, who has served as OPS Deputy Chief since 2016, was named as the interim Police Chief.

== See also ==
- Ottawa By-law Services
