= Humane Canada =

Canadian animal welfare organization

- Founded: 1957; 69 years ago
- Type: Non-profit
- Purpose: Animal welfare
- Headquarters: Ottawa, Ontario
- Location: Canada
- Official language: English; French
- Key people: Barbara Cartwright (CEO)
- Budget: $535,000 (2013)
- Staff: 5
- Website: humanecanada.ca
- Formerly called: Canadian Federation of Humane Societies

The Canadian Federation of Humane Societies (CFHS), branded as Humane Canada, is a non-profit animal welfare organization in Canada, representing humane societies, SPCAs, and animal rescue organizations. The organization's stated goal is to promote the welfare and humane treatment of animals and work to end animal cruelty.

== History ==
Based in Ottawa, Humane Canada was founded in 1957 as the Canadian Federation of Humane Societies. Some of its founders were Richard Taylor, president of the Ottawa Humane Society; Alne Cameron, former Veterinary Director General for Canada and president of the Ottawa Humane Society; Senator Frederic McGrand; and former lawyer Gord Gunn, who had witnessed the suffering of horses in World War I.

Currently, the organization is led by Chief Executive Officer Barbara Cartwright, who joined Humane Canada in July 2011. Recent prior CEOs include: Steve Carrol (2006-2011) and Robert Van Tongerloo (2000-2005).

In 2018 the organization rebranded its name to Humane Canada, though its legal name remains the Canadian Federation of Humane Societies.

== Programs ==
Humane Canada's program work focuses on companion animals, livestock and legislation. The organization works to improve legislation to improve the prosecution of some animal abusers. The Federation works with the Canadian livestock sector to improve standards of care for animals on farm, as well as in transit and at slaughter. As a founding member of the National Companion Animal Coalition, Humane Canada has been involved in setting the standard for microchip identification for pets, and has worked on such issues as dog bite prevention, puppy mills and municipal bylaws for dogs and cats. Humane Canada is also a member of the Animal Welfare Committee of the Canadian Veterinary Medical Association.

== National Animal Welfare Conference ==
The organization holds national animal welfare conferences. The 2014 conference included presentations by Jane Goodall, veterinarian Michelle Lem on a Community Veterinary Outreach Program in Ontario, and a discussion of trap-neuter-return to humanely reduce community cat populations. Animal testing was also discussed.

The 2015 conference took place in May in Richmond, British Columbia.

== Funding ==
Humane Canada does not receive any government funding. It relies on donations from the public, corporate sponsorship and some membership fees to fund its programs.

== Governance ==
Humane Canada is governed by a volunteer-based Board of Directors. Board members may be employed by member societies. The members of the Board meet four times each year (two face-to-face, two conference calls), while both the Executive and Finance Committees meet monthly. The CFHS website maintains a current list of directors.

== Membership ==
In 2013, the organization's members included 45 animal welfare organizations, humane societies and SPCAs operating across Canada.

== Publications ==
- Animal Welfare in Focus is the organization's newsletter. Past issues are available online. A monthly e-newsletter is also available for subscription.
- In February 2014, in conjunction with World Spay Day, the CFHS published The Case for Accessible Spay/Neuter in Canada, which "illuminates the lack of accessible spay/neuter in communities across the country and what can be done about it."
- Cats in Canada: A comprehensive Report on the Cat Overpopulation crisis was published in 2012.
- Position statements have been published on numerous issues, such as animals in entertainment, euthanasia of companion animals, and surgical mutilation.

== See also ==
- Legal status of animals in Canada
