= Municipal government of Ottawa =

Government of the city of Ottawa, Canada

City of Ottawa Ville d'Ottawa
- Municipal government
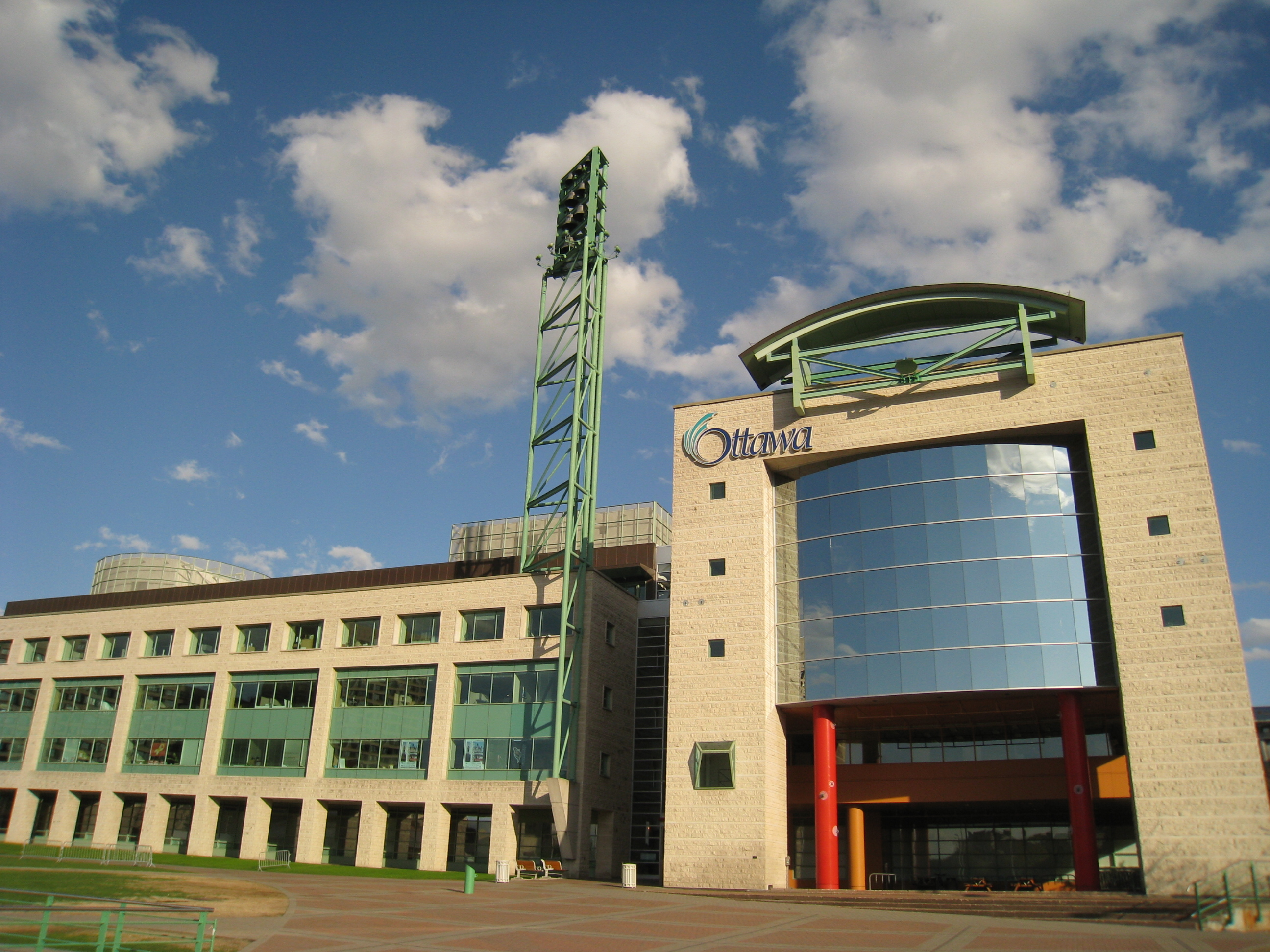
- Municipal logo Ottawa City Hall, the seat of government
- Formation: January 1, 1850; 176 years ago (historic); January 1, 2001; 25 years ago (current)
- Statutory authority: City of Ottawa Act
- Type: Single-tier municipality with a mayor-council system
- Website: ottawa.ca

City of Ottawa
- Mayor: Mark Sutcliffe
- Deputy Mayors: Stéphanie Plante; Catherine Kitts
- City Manager: Wendy Stephanson

Ottawa City Council
- Speaker: Mayor Sutcliffe
- Membership: 1 mayor; 24 city councillors
- Appointed by: Direct election every four years
- Seat: Ottawa City Hall

The municipal government of Ottawa, known as the City of Ottawa (French: Ville d'Ottawa) is the government of Ottawa, Ontario, Canada that delivers municipal services to the residents of Ottawa. It is administered by the Ottawa City Council, an elected body. The City of Ottawa is a single-tier municipality, meaning it is in itself a census division and has no county or regional municipality government above it, and has no subsidiary municipalities to provide municipal services.

The Ottawa Public Service is the municipal civil service. The city employs over 10,600 staff, who provide politically neutral advice and implement the policies, programs and decisions of city council. The city manager sits at the top of the city's administrative structure as head of the Ottawa Public Service and the chief administrative officer (CAO). The city manager, along with other senior leadership roles such as deputy city managers and the general managers of city divisions, are appointed by the mayor and take direction from council.

== History ==
The City of Ottawa was founded in 1826 as Bytown. It was incorporated in 1850 by legislation of Upper Canada. The first election in Bytown was held on September 11, 1847 for a seven-seat council. Bytown was initially incorporated on July 28, 1847, and sanctioned by both the Legislative Assembly and the governor, but eventually this was disallowed by the Queen, possibly due to the perceived threat to Ordnance. An act of the Legislative Assembly further facilitated the incorporation of municipalities, and on January 1, 1850, Bytown was incorporated.

When first founded, it was part of the County of Carleton. This was modified in 1969, with the dissolution of the county and its municipalities into the two-tier Regional Municipality of Ottawa–Carleton. Primarily centred on the City of Ottawa, it was created by restructuring Carleton County and annexing Cumberland Township from the United Counties of Prescott and Russell. In 2001, the regional municipality was dissolved and its constituent municipalities were amalgamated into one single city of Ottawa.

== Governance ==
The City of Ottawa is a publicly-owned corporation. It is governed by an elected mayor and city council. It exists under the authority of the City of Ottawa Act, legislation of the Legislative Assembly of Ontario, enacted in 1999. Ottawa is subject to Ontario's strong mayor powers.

Ottawa City Council is composed of 24 city councillors and the mayor. The mayor is elected at large, while each councillor represents a ward district of the city. Council members are elected to four-year terms, with the last election being on October 24, 2022. In most months, City Council meets the second and fourth Wednesday of the month in Andrew S. Haydon Hall at City Hall. In the month of March, July, August and December, it meets once. In an election year it meets once in October as determined by the Mayor.

== Offices and departments ==
As of May 2026, the corporation has the following departments and offices reporting to the City Manager:

=== Offices ===
- City Manager's Office
- Office of the City Solicitor
- Office of the City Clerk

=== Departments ===
- Community and Social Services
- Emergency and Protective Services
  - By-law Services
  - Fire Services
  - Paramedic Services
- Finance and Corporate Services
- Infrastructure and Water Services
- Planning, Development and Building Services
- Public Works
- Recreation, Cultural and Facility Services
- Strategic Initiatives
- Transit Services

Services are funded through property taxes, user fees, and provincial or federal government transfers. This is the operational budget. A second budget is made for capital projects. The capital budget is funded through reserve funds, development charges, debt and provincial or federal government grants. Budgets are determined annually in a public process that includes presentations from city staff, council debate, and resident input. The overall city budget must be balanced under the Ontario Municipal Act.

== Facilities ==
Facilities that are owned or managed directly by the City of Ottawa corporation include:

- ByWard Market - Ottawa manages the main market building
- Lansdowne Park - A public-private partnership managing sports and retail facilities.
- Parkdale Market - An open-air market
- Ottawa City Hall - The seat of government

The Recreation, Cultural and Family Services department manages numerous parks and recreational facilities.
