= Ottawa Humane Society =

- Formation: 1888
- Type: Humane Society
- Legal status: active
- Headquarters: Ottawa, Ontario
- Region served: Ottawa
- Official language: English & French
- Affiliations: Canadian Federation of Humane Societies
- Website: ottawahumane.ca

The Ottawa Humane Society (1888 to present) is the humane society for Ottawa, Ontario, Canada.

== Background ==
The Ottawa Humane Society is a non-profit organization, community-based organization and a registered charitable organization, "Charity Registration Number: # 123264715 RR0001". The Board of Directors is voluntary.

A group of women formed the Women's Humane Society of Ottawa in January 1888. This organization enforced the new animal protection laws and focused on bettering the lives of neglected children by lobbying for legislation to provide for foster homes. In 1896, this group evolved into the Ottawa Humane Society, with the newly established Children's Aid Society assisting the needy children within the community.

In 1933 the organization began providing shelter services for stray animals to the City of Ottawa. They continue to hold the municipal contract for stray animal shelter services.

In 1979, the Ottawa Humane Society was renamed the Humane Society of Ottawa-Carleton. The organization reverted to the name Ottawa Humane Society in 2001, when the Ottawa-Carleton region was amalgamated.

== Status ==
The Ottawa Humane Society is an "open admission" animal shelter, which means they do not restrict the types of animals they accept. It also accepts any number of animals regardless of their age, temperament, or space limitations within the shelter.

== See also ==
- Canadian Federation of Humane Societies
