= Ottawa Fire Services =

Fire service of Ottawa, Ontario, Canada

Operational area
- Country: Canada
- Address: 1445 Carling Avenue Ottawa, ON K1Z 7L9

Agency overview
- Established: 2001
- Annual calls: 106,667 (2023)
- Employees: 1,500 (2023)
- Staffing: Career, Paid volunteer
- Commissioner: Kim Ayotte
- Fire chief: Paul Hutt
- EMS level: CFR
- IAFF: 162
- Motto: Protecting the Nation's Capital with Honour

Facilities and equipment
- Divisions: 9
- Battalions: 9
- Stations: 45
- Engines: 50
- Trucks: 17
- Rescues: 6
- Ambulances: See Ottawa Paramedic Service
- Tenders: 18
- HAZMAT: 2
- Rescue boats: 6

Website
- Official website

The Ottawa Fire Services (OFS; French: Service des incendies d’Ottawa) provides fire protection, technical rescue services, hazardous materials response, and first responder emergency medical assistance to the city of Ottawa, Ontario, Canada.

== Organization ==
Like most North American fire departments, the Ottawa Fire Services is organized in a paramilitary fashion. The current Chief of the department is Paul Hutt. Serving under Hutt are three Deputy Chiefs, four Platoon Chiefs, five Division Chiefs, four Rural Sector Chiefs and twenty District Chiefs. At the station level, each urban station has a Captain for each of the four platoons. Each truck in the fleet is under the command of either a Captain or Lieutenant. For rural paid-on-call stations, each station has a station Captain and four Lieutenants.

== History ==
The current Ottawa Fire Services came into existence in 2001 with the amalgamation of nine fire departments from Ottawa and the surrounding areas. The nine former departments include the Ottawa Fire Department, Gloucester Fire Department, Cumberland Fire Department, Kanata Fire Department, Nepean Fire Department, Osgoode Fire Department, Rideau Fire Department, Goulbourn Fire Department and West Carleton Fire Department.

== Operations ==
There are 45 fire stations located across Ottawa, including 16 Paid On-Call stations and 5 composite stations. The stations are assigned to 9 district operations units. On Friday September 3, 2010, Chief deHooge announced that a three-year trial testing the use of 24-hour shift rotations would begin in January 2011. In Canada twelve of the fifteen largest fire departments are using the 24-hour shift rotation.

== Equipment ==
Currently, City of Ottawa firefighters are issued tan Starfield Lion bunker gear, black leather Haix structural fire boots, and traditional black Cairns 664 structural firefighting helmets for firefighters, red 664 for Lieutenants and Captains and white 664 for Chief Officers. In 2015, the department phased out their SCBAs (previously the ISI Viking), and replaced them with the MSA Firehawk M7XT with Rescue Belt II system and Ultra Elite facepiece.

== Fire stations and apparatus ==
Ottawa Fire Services Pump/Tank 72

Station #	District #	Neighbourhood	Pump Company	Tower Company or Ladder Company	Pump Tank or Tanker unit	Car (Chief) unit	Miscellaneous units	Address	Build year
11	1	Little Italy / Chinatown	Pump 11	Ladder 11		Car 10 (District Chief)	Water Rescue 11 Boat 11	135 Preston Street	1985
12	1	The Glebe	Pump 12				Rescue 12; Rope Rescue 12	635 O'Connor Street	1974
13	1	Sandy Hill / University of Ottawa	Pump 13A; Pump 13B	Ladder 13				530 King Edward Avenue	1985
21	2	Kenson Park	Pump 21				Haz-Mat 21	1300 Woodroffe Avenue	1986
22	2	Lincoln Heights	Pump 22	Tower 22			Water Rescue 22 Boat 22	1397 Richmond Road	1989
23 (Headquarters)	2	Westboro	Pump 23			Car 1 (Fire Chief); Car 2 (Deputy Chief); Car 3 (Deputy Chief); Car 4 (Deputy Chief); Car 5 (Deputy Chief); Car 6 (Platoon Chief); Car 7 (Deputy Chief); Car 20 (District Chief)	Safety Officer 23 Public Information Officer Maintenance 1 Maintenance 2 Maintenance 3 Maintenance 4 Maintenance 5 Fire Prevention||1443 Carling Avenue||1985		
24	2	Carleton Heights	Pump 24	Ladder 24			Haz-Mat 24; IHAT 24	230 Viewmount Drive, Nepean	1988
25	2	Crestview	Pump 25				Foam Tender 25	60 Knoxdale Road, Nepean	
31	3	Greenboro	Pump 31			Car 30 (District Chief)		3255 Conroy Road	1988
32	3	Leitrim	Pump 32	Ladder 32				3202 Leitrim Road, Gloucester	1996
33	3	Huntclub	Pump 33	Tower 33				3336 McCarthy Road	1983
34	3	Riverside Park	Pump 34					700 Brookfield Road	1987
35 (Communications)	3	Alta Vista	Pump 35	Tower 35				2355 Alta Vista Drive	1991
36	3	Pineview	Pump 36					1935 Cyrville Road	2017
37	3	Riverside South	Pump 37	Tower 37			Water Rescue 37 Boat 37	910 Earl Armstrong Road	2004
41	4	Glen Cairn	Pump 41			Car 40 (District Chief)		380 Eagleson Road, Kanata	1981
42	4	Beaverbrook	Pump 42	Ladder 42				1021 Teron Road, Kanata	1970
43	4	Bell's Corners	Pump 43				Rescue 43; Rope Rescue 43	3845 Old Richmond Road	1990
44	4	Barrhaven	Pump 44	Ladder 44			Tech Rescue 44 ONT USAR TF-4	1075 Greenbank Road	1979
45	4	March	Pump 45		Pump Tank 45		Squad 45; Air Tender 45	1075 March Road, Kanata	2023
46	4	Kanata West	Pump 46	Tower 46			Command 46	34 Iber Road	2011
47	4	Barrhaven South	Pump 47				Tech Rescue Support 47	3559 Greenbank Road	2011
51	5	Quarries	Pump 51	Tower 51		Car 50 (District Chief)		900 Montreal Road	
52	5	Convent Glen	Pump 52				Rescue 52	6213 Jeanne D'Arc Boulevard, Orleans	1978
53	5	Fallingbrook	Pump 53	Ladder 53			Water Rescue 53 Boat 53	500 Charlemagne Boulevard, Orleans	1991
54 (Air and Rehab)	5	Blackburn Hamlet	Pump 54	Ladder 54			Rehab 54; Air Management 54	3080 Innes Road	1991
55	5	Summerside	Pump 55					2283 Portobello Boulevard, Orleans	2017
56	5	Overbrook	Pump 56					275 Coventry Road	1986
57	5	Vanier	Pump 57	Ladder 57				220 Beechwood Avenue	1987
61	6	Kinburn	Pump 61		Tanker 61		Service Vehicle 61	3150 Kinburn Side Road	1983
62	6	Fitzroy Harbour	Pump 62		Tanker 62		Water Rescue 62 Boat 62	6900 Harbour Street	1976
63	6	Constance Bay			Pump Tank 63; Tanker 63		Brush Truck 63; UTV 63; Snowmobile 63	341 Bayview Drive, Woodlawn	1988
64	6	Carp	Pump 64		Tanker 64	Car 60 (District Chief)	Rescue 64	475 Donald B. Munro Drive	
66	6	Dunrobin		Ladder 66	Pump Tank 66			3285 Dunrobin Road	1987
71	7	Navan	Pump 71		Tanker 71		Brush Truck 71; UTV 71	1246 Colonial Road	
72	7	Cumberland Village	Pump 72		Pump Tank 72 Tanker 72		Service Vehicle 72	2245 Old Montreal Road	1997
73	7	Vars	Pump 73		Tanker 73	Car 70 (District Chief)	Service Vehicle 73	6090 Rockdale Road	2007
81	8	Stittsville	Pump 81		Pump Tank 81 Tanker 81	Car 80 (District Chief)	Service Vehicle 81	1641 Stittsville Main Street	
82	8	Richmond	Pump 82		Tanker 82		Rescue 82	6280 Perth Street	1994
83	8	North Gower	Pump 83		Tanker 83		Brush Truck 83; UTV 83	2352 Roger Stevens Drive	
84	8	Corkery			Pump Tank 84		Brush Truck 84; Squad 84; UTV 84	3449 Old Almonte Road	1986
91	9	Metcalfe		Tower 91	Pump Tank 91		Service Vehicle 91	8011 Victoria Street	
92	9	Osgoode	Pump 92		Tanker 92		Water Rescue 92 Boat 92	3110 Nixon Drive	
93	9	Greely			Pump Tank 93		Rescue 93; Brush Truck 93; UTV 93	6891 Parkway Road	
94	9	Manotick	Pump 94		Tanker 94	Car 90 (District Chief)	Service Vehicle 94	5669 Manotick Main Street	1993

== Apparatus glossary ==
- Pump (P)
- Ladder (L)
- Tower (T)
- Rescue (R)
- Tanker (TA)
- Pump/Tank (PT)
- Hazardous materials unit (HM)
- Technical Rescue unit (TR)
- Squad (S)
- Service Vehicle (SV)
- Brush Truck (BT)
- Water Rescue (WR)
- Rope Rescue (RR)
- Air Tender (AT)
- Air Management (AM)
- Rehab Vehicle (RHB)
- Safety Officer (SO)
- Officers Car (C)
- Fire Investigator (INV)
- Foam Tender (FT)
- Command Vehicle (CMD)
- Initial Hazard Assessment Team (IHAT)
- Utility-Terrain Vehicle (UTV)
- All-Terrain Vehicle (ATV)
- Snowmobile (SM)
- Public Information Officer (PIO)

== Support offices ==
Office	Address	Division
Ottawa Fire Services Headquarters	1445 Carling Avenue	Head Office
Ottawa Fire Services Headquarters	1445 Carling Avenue	Fire Department Administration
Ottawa Fire Services Headquarters	1443 Carling Avenue	Equipment Maintenance Division
Ottawa Fire Services Headquarters	1443 Carling Avenue	Safety Officer's Division
Ben Franklin Place	101 Centerpointe Drive	Bureau of Investigations and Prevention
Charles Sim Municipal Garage	2799 Swansea Crescent	Fleet Maintenance Division
Ottawa Fire Services Training Centre	898 Industrial Avenue	Training Division
Ottawa Fire Services Communications Centre	1423 Randall Ave	Communications and Dispatch Division
Ottawa Fire Services Air Management Centre	3080 Innes Road	Air Management and Rehabilitation Division

== Notable Incidents ==
The history of the Ottawa Fire Services includes several notable incidents, including the 1900 Hull–Ottawa fire.

== See also ==
- Ottawa Paramedic Service
- Ottawa Police Service
- Ottawa By-law Services
