= Ottawa By-law Services =

Ottawa By-law and Regulatory Services Services des Règlements Municipaux

Agency overview
- Formed: 2001
- Employees: 222.3 FTEs (2024)

Jurisdictional structure
- Legal jurisdiction: City of Ottawa

Operational structure
- Headquarters: Ottawa, Ontario
- Agency executive: Roger Chapman, Chief of By-law

Facilities
- Stations: 1

Ottawa By-law and Regulatory Services (BLRS; French: Services des Règlements Municipaux) is a branch of the municipal government of Ottawa, Ontario. It enforces local by-laws including parking, noise, property standards, animal control, and other areas regulated by the City of Ottawa.

== History ==
The current conceptualization of By-law Services came into existence on January 1, 2001, when the City of Ottawa Act, 1999 amalgamated the former Region of Ottawa-Carleton and the former municipalities of Ottawa, Nepean, Kanata, Gloucester, Vanier, Cumberland, West Carleton Township, Goulburn Township, Rideau Township, Osgoode Township, and Rockcliffe Park into the single-tier municipality of Ottawa. As a result, the regulatory and parking enforcement services of these former municipalities were consolidated within the City of Ottawa By-law and Regulatory Services Branch.

By-law Services provides regulatory services to help protect the public health, safety and property rights of citizens by maintaining a standard quality of life through timely and effective enforcement of by-laws enacted by city council and other pieces of provincial legislation delegated to the city by the provincial government. These enforcement activities may include: yard maintenance, property standards and zoning, noise control, animal care and control, parking and traffic enforcement, graffiti management, taxi licensing and inspections, nuisance abatement, and business licensing. These enforcement and regulatory activities provided by the service are similar to Code Enforcement Officers in the United States. However, Code Enforcement is narrower in scope and only encompasses what is considered as property standards and zoning.

Call volumes for by-law enforcement has increased over the years. In 2005, the City of Ottawa received 53,718 by-law complaints and this has increased to approximately 73,000 in 2011. This increase in call volume can be attributed to the introduction of 3-1-1 in 2005. Contact with the service may be initiated by phone through 3-1-1 or online through ServiceOttawa.

Employees at the branch who conducts enforcement activities are known as by-law enforcement officers. Under s. 15(2) of the Police Services Act, 1990, by-law officers are deemed to be peace officers for the purpose of enforcing municipal by-laws.

By-law Services, along with the Ottawa Fire Service, the Ottawa Paramedic Service, and the Security and Emergency Management Branch fall under the umbrella of the Emergency and Protective Services Department, which reports to the department's general manager.

== Organization ==
By-law Services employs a stratified enforcement model where different tasks within the branch are handled by different classes of employees. Officers are assigned to the following tasks within the service:

- Licensing
- Parking operations
- Property standards and zoning
- General enforcement (noise, animal care and control)

The service is structured hierarchically with a defined system of supervision. The highest ranking position within the service is the chief of by-law followed by program managers, coordinators, supervisors, and officers. At the current moment in time there are no formal ranking structure for the officers.

== Inter-agency relationships ==
By-law Services operates daily from 0600 - 0200 (Except Friday/Saturday night when they work until 0400). The only exception is between November 15 and April 1 when winter snow operations are in effect. When there is a prediction of 7 cm or more of snow being forecast by Environment Canada, a Winter overnight parking ban will come into effect. Further, the Service will supplement the city's snow removal operations during this period by towing vehicles to nearby streets so that city crews could remove snow that has accumulated on the side of the road.

In 2011, the City of Ottawa passed a by-law that amended by-law 2002–189, which came into effect on February 1, 2012. The by-law authorizes private security and parking management companies to issue City of Ottawa parking infractions on deputized private properties. Under the Private Parking Enforcement Agency Program (PPEA), licensed agencies are authorized to issue infractions related to unauthorized parking, parking in designated fire routes, parking in accessible spaces without a disabled permit, as well as authorizing vehicles to be towed from private lots.

By-law maintains a working relationship with the Ottawa Police Service as many of the service's activities supplements or is outside police mandate. The relationship is especially important at night as by-law enforces all categories of noise complaints that may require police support.

The service also maintains a close relationship with the Ottawa Humane Society (OHS) due to the service's mandate of animal care and control. The City of Ottawa contracts out the Municipal Animal Shelter to OHS. All dogs and cats that are picked up by By-law Services are transported to the OHS facilities located at 245 West Hunt Club Road. Furthermore, by-law also works closely with the Ministry of Natural Resources as it helps coordinate activates in regards to large wild mammal response.

== Operations ==
The City of Ottawa By-law Services has one facility located on Industrial Ave.

=== Patrol operations ===
- East enforcement
- West enforcement
- Parking operations

=== Other enforcement operations ===
- Licensing and taxi enforcement
- Tobacco enforcement
- Property standards and zoning enforcement
- Special animal/wildlife teams

=== Support services ===
- 3-1-1 communications
- By-law dispatch (under operational control of Security & Emergency Management)
- Spay and neuter clinic

=== Business services ===
- Business licensing
- Taxi licensing
- Market operations (Byward and Parkdale Markets)
- Special events

== Fleet ==
The majority of marked vehicles within the service were Chevrolet Cobalts and Pontiac G5s before they started using Ford Explorers, which are currently the majority of their fleet. These vehicles and other sedans are primarily used by parking, licensing, and property standards officers. Specially fitted vehicles (usually vans and trucks) are used by general enforcement officers as these vehicles are fitted with animal cages that facilitates animal pick up. The service also employs a variety of unmarked vehicles to supplement its operations.

Vehicles
Chevrolet Cobalt/Pontiac G5
Chevrolet Aveo
Chevrolet Cavalier
Honda Civic
Jeep Liberty
Ford Escape
Ford Explorer
Ford Focus
Chevrolet Impala
Ford Ranger/and Other Small Trucks and SUVs
Dodge Grand Caravan/ Ford Transit Connect and Other Vans
Other Miscellaneous Vehicles

== See also ==
- Parking enforcement officer
