= Death of Abdirahman Abdi =

Death of a Somali-Canadian, in Ottawa, Ontario

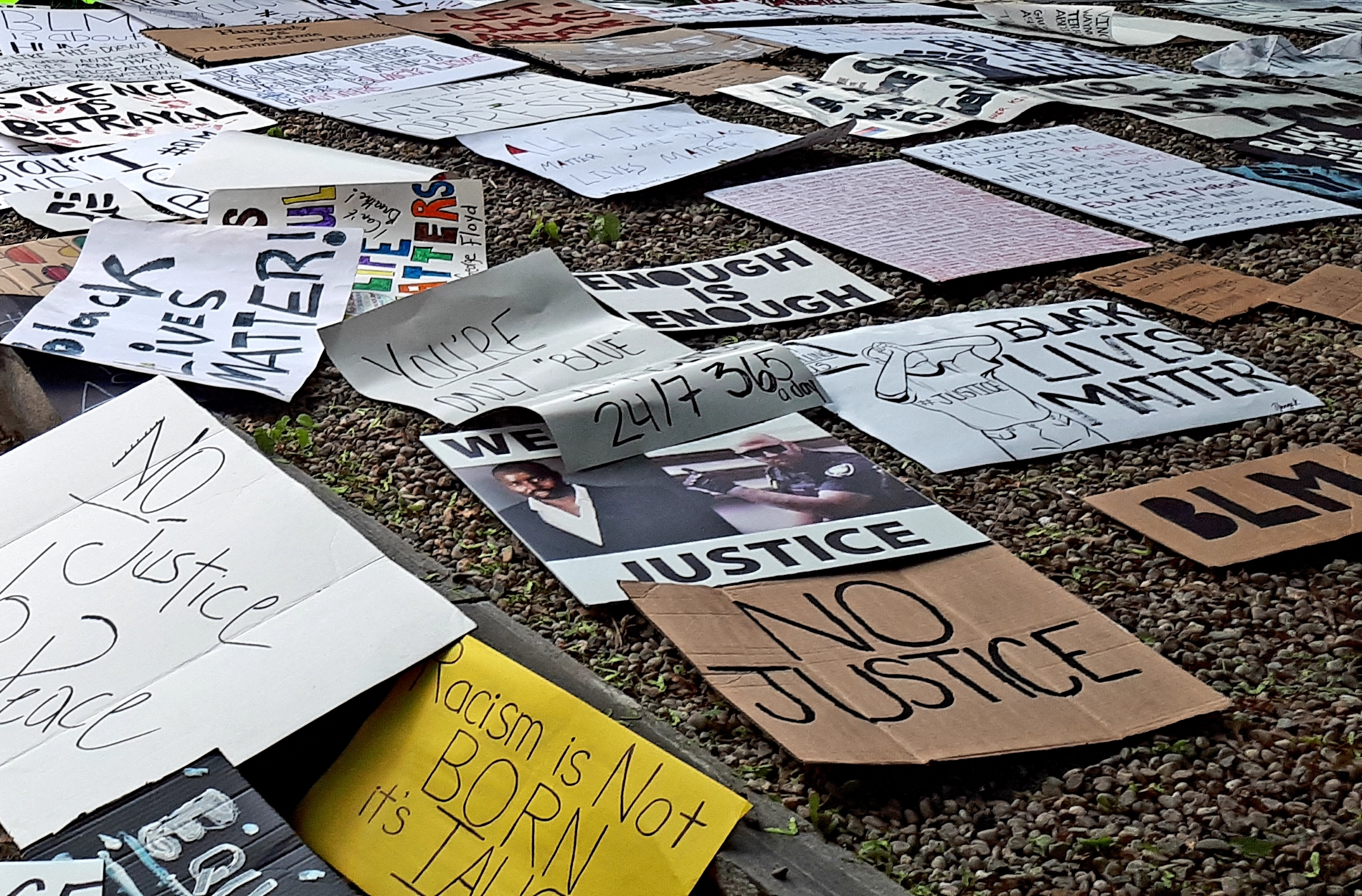
- Abdirahman Abdi signs amongst the protests signs in Downtown Ottawa, June, 2020
- Date: July 24, 2016
- Time: c. 9:30 a.m. (EDT)
- Location: Fairmont Avenue and Wellington Street West, Ottawa, Ontario, Canada; 45°24′23.3″N 075°43′21″W
- Participants: Constable Daniel Montsion
- Outcome: Not Guilty
- Deaths: Abdirahman Abdi
- Charges: Manslaughter, aggravated assault, assault with a weapon
- Verdict: Not guilty

The death of Abdirahman Abdi (Somali: Cabdiraxmaan Cabdi), a Somali-Canadian, occurred on July 24, 2016, in the neighbourhood of Hintonburg in Ottawa, Ontario. Abdi died in an incident with the Ottawa Police Service.

== Background ==
Abdi had come to Canada from Somalia in 2009. He worked at a local car wash, though he was unemployed in the months leading up to his death. At the time of his death, he was 37 years old. Following his death, Abdi's family described him as someone with mental health issues.

== Arrest and death ==
At approximately 9:30 a.m. on July 24, 2016, police were called to the Hintonburg Bridgehead coffee shop on the corner of Fairmont Avenue and Wellington Street West over allegations that Abdi was groping women there. J.M. Duval, a witness who was present at the coffee shop since 9:15 a.m., said he saw a commotion and that the front doors were locked as a group outside restrained Abdi. Duval said it looked like Abdi was trying to either flee or get back into the shop. Duval asked the allegedly assaulted woman (who had been taken to the back of the shop) in French what had happened and she repeatedly said (translated) "He groped me." Tracey Clark, the owner of Bridgehead who was not present during the incident, gave a statement on August 5 after speaking with staff and customers, describing Abdi as having harassed and assaulted multiple people in the shop. Clark mentioned this was not the first incident with him and that he would sometimes stare at customers and get too close to them. Clark said that they had previously intervened by asking Abdi if he was aware of what he was doing and if he could stop.

=== Pursuit and altercation ===
Constable David Weir arrived on scene at approximately 9:42 a.m. He asked Abdi to place his hands on the window of a nearby diner, which he did. However, when Weir reached for his handcuffs, Abdi fled down Wellington Street West toward his apartment building at 55 Hilda Street, about 250 metres from the Bridgehead.

At some point during the pursuit, Abdi picked up a 13.6-kilogram rubber weight used for holding temporary street signs in place and held it above his head Abdi reached his building at approximately 9:48 am. Weir caught up to Abdi just outside the main entrance and shoved him from behind, forcing him to drop the weight and sending him crashing into the doors of his apartment complex. Constable Daniel Montsion arrived moments later.

What happened next is unclear because of conflicting accounts provided by witnesses. However, CCTV footage shot from the lobby of Abdi's apartment building shows Montsion punching Abdi in the face. The two officers then forced Abdi to the ground. Montsion could be seen striking Abdi in the legs and twice more in the head. Abdi then lost consciousness. The officers turned him on his side into a recovery position and called for paramedics at 9:49 a.m.

=== Death ===
Paramedics arrived at 9:56 a.m. However, they believed they were responding to a pepper spray incident and spent some time getting debriefed by the officers before approaching Abdi. It was not until the paramedics checked Abdi's vital signs that they began CPR. Abdi was taken to the Ottawa Civic Hospital. Abdi was removed from life support and pronounced dead the following day.

== SIU investigation ==
As required under the Police Services Act, the provincial Special Investigations Unit (SIU) conducted an investigation into the incident. The SIU is required to investigate all reports of deaths, serious injuries, or sexual assaults in relation to provincial or municipal police officers.

Two Ottawa Police Service officers who were involved in the arrest – Constable David Weir and Constable Daniel Montsion – were designated as subject officers during the course of the investigation. Constable Weir was later re-classified as a witness officer, while Constable Montsion would be charged with manslaughter.

On March 6, 2017, the SIU laid charges against Constable Daniel Montsion for manslaughter, aggravated assault, and assault with a weapon in relation to the death of Abdi. On October 20, 2020, Montsion was found not guilty on all charges.

== Aftermath ==
Abdi's funeral was held on Friday, July 29 at the Ottawa (Main) Mosque, with 800 inside and more outside. Naeem Malik, President of the Ottawa Muslim Association, estimated total attendance at over 2,000 people. The funeral was led by Imam Mohamed Hachimi and a family statement was read by Imam Sikander Hashmi of the Kanata Muslim Association. Mayor Jim Watson spoke at the funeral.

The Canadian Somali Mothers' Association called for the two officers to be removed and the Canadian Council of Muslim Women requested a critical look at the case.

In late August, Black Lives Matter's Toronto chapter protested the SIU in Mississauga in response to Abdi's death.

=== Lawsuit ===
The Abdi family retained lawyer Lawrence Greenspon two days after Abdi's death on July 27. The family launched a $1.5 million civil lawsuit against the Ottawa Police Services Board, then-Ottawa police chief Charles Bordeleau, Montsion, and Weir. The Ottawa Police Services Board reached an undisclosed settlement with the family in January 2021.
