= Ontario Prehospital Advanced Life Support Studies =

The Ontario Prehospital Advanced Life Support (OPALS) Studies were a series of multi-center before-and-after clinical trials looking at the impact of prehospital advanced life support services. The studies have not found the addition of advanced life support services to increase survival to hospital discharge for cardiac arrest patients.

== Cardiac Arrest ==
- Phase 1, basic life support with defibrillation, January 1, 1991 to January 31, 1995
- Phase 2, optimized basic life support, July 1, 1994, to March 31, 1997
- Phase 3, addition of advanced life support, February 1, 1998, to June 30, 2002
