= Toronto Paramedic Services =

Statutory emergency medical services provider

- Established: 1975
- Headquarters: Toronto, Ontario
- Jurisdiction: Municipal
- Employees: ~1400
- Chief: Bikram Chawla
- Medical director: Dr. Morgan Hillier
- Website: Official website

The City of Toronto Paramedic Services (TPS; formerly known as Toronto Emergency Medical Services) is the statutory emergency medical services provider in Toronto, Ontario, Canada. The service is operated as a division of the City of Toronto, under the Community & Social Services cluster. The service is funded by the municipal tax base, and operates similarly to other municipal divisions, such as the Toronto Parks, Forestry & Recreation division, or the Toronto Water division, but retains operational independence from other divisions. While under municipal government control, it is subject to provincial legislation and licensing. It is not the only service provider in its area; private-for-profit medical transport services also provide routine, non-emergency transports and coverage for special events, but the statutory emergency medical system is the only provider permitted to service emergency calls.

== History ==
The City of Toronto has operated an ambulance service directly on an uninterrupted basis since 1883, when the City of Toronto Health Department acquired two ambulances to transport those with infectious diseases to the local sanitarium. Full-time emergency ambulance service began in 1888, with the provision of emergency ambulance service by the Toronto Police Force, which eventually operated four horse-drawn vehicles. Prior to these two municipal initiatives, ambulance service was provided for the young city by a variety of means, including both hospital-based and private companies. This 'broad spectrum' approach to service delivery would continue for more than ninety years.

Toronto may very well be able to claim to have the first formally trained 'ambulance attendants' in North America, with the Toronto Police Force ambulance service staff receiving five days of formal training in their jobs from the St. John Ambulance Brigade in 1889. Training included first aid skills, anatomy and physiology. Such training for ambulance attendants was unheard of at that time, outside of military circles. The police constables assigned to the ambulance also did regular policing, when not required for ambulance calls. As the city grew and technology progressed, so did the ambulance service. The first motorized ambulance was actually purchased by a local funeral home in 1911, and the Toronto Police Ambulance Service began the conversion from horse-drawn to motorized vehicles in 1913, with the process largely completed by 1918. Over the years, the two City of Toronto departments would have their services supplemented by more than 130 individual ambulance operators, most of them private companies, and in suburban areas by several of the tiny, local fire departments. The two municipal services would finally be merged in 1933, when the Toronto Police Department turned the operation of their ambulances over to the Department of Public Health, and ended their involvement in the city's ambulance service.

This service would grow again in 1953, as the result of the creation of the municipality of Metropolitan Toronto, dramatically expanding the required service area. Service would continue in this fashion until 1967, when the amalgamated City's suburban fire departments surrendered their ambulances, resulting in the evolution of the Department of Public Health Ambulance Service into the City-operated Department of Emergency Services (DES). Some private companies, and one operated by the provincial government, would continue to operate in 'Metro' Toronto until 1975, although with centralized dispatch services provided by DES.

The Metropolitan Toronto Department of Ambulance Services was created in 1975 under the leadership of John Dean, and absorbed the five remaining private ambulance companies and single provincial service, providing a single, unified ambulance service in Metro Toronto. Known colloquially as Metro Toronto Ambulance or simply Metro Ambulance (although never its official name) the service provided ambulance services from 1975 to 1998.

Metropolitan Toronto was restructured during 1998, transforming it from a regional government overseeing six member municipalities into a single, unified city, and many municipal and regional services were restructured as a result. Metro Ambulance became Toronto Ambulance then Toronto Emergency Medical Services in 1998 under the leadership of Chief Ron Kelusky, in order to reflect its evolving role from primarily a provider of medical transportation to an actual provider of medical care. It was at that time that the service undertook a rebranding with the unique forward facing A on all of its vehicles.

The service introduced its first paramedics in 1984 (although experiments in pre-hospital advanced life support actually began in 1969). Toronto EMS introduced many other innovations, including the concept of dedicated ground-based critical care transport ambulances in 1998, as well as many specialty support units described in this article, many of which were originally conceived and pioneered by the service.

As of April 2005, the departments and commissioners were replaced by divisions under the city manager (and deputy managers). Toronto EMS now operates under the city's Emergency Medical Services Division. It is the largest municipal EMS operation in Canada and at the time was led by Chief Bruce Farr.

In July 2014, Chief Paul Raftis announced that as part of a rebranding effort, Toronto EMS will change its name to Toronto Paramedic Services. The change follows a national trend and drive for the adoption of Paramedic as the publicly recognized title for prehospital emergency care providers. On October 1, the new name came to effect.

== Uniforms ==
Uniforms consist of:

- Dark navy short or long sleeve police style shirt with departmental crest, reflective stripes around arms and Toronto Paramedic in reflective print on chest and back.
- Chartreuse high visibility jacket with Toronto Paramedic in reflective print on back as well as job title (Paramedic, Supervisor etc...) front and back. Certain Specialized Operations teams have their own distinctive coloured jackets: CBRNE paramedics wear Orange, Critical Care paramedics wear Red and Tactical paramedics wear Black.
- Dark navy cargo pants with reflective stripes around lower leg.
- White shirts for Supervisory/Management staff.
- Bicycle helmet and shorts for bike crews.
- Hard hat with visor as required (construction sites, vehicle extrication etc...).
- Black safety boots/shoes.
- FR Military style tactical shirt/pants, gloves, Ballistic helmet/riot helmet and Ballistic vest for tactical units.
- HAZMAT suits for CBRNE units.
- Dress uniform consisting of dark navy pants and tunic, white shirt, navy tie and forage cap. Paramedic uniforms have royal blue cap band and striping on pants. Management staff have black maple laurels as well as gold piping on cap peak. Striping is orange-gold for the honour guard.

== Fleet ==
Of the 242 vehicles in the Toronto Paramedic Services fleet, 150 are CMVSS / Ontario Standard Type III ambulances. Of these, approximately 100 are in service at any time on a typical, mid-week, day shift. These vehicles are currently supplied by Crestline Coach Ltd. . They are mounted on Chevrolet Express van chassis with boxes custom built by Crestline to suit the needs of the service, As of 2025, new ambulances are built on the Crestline Fleetmax 2.0 ambulance platform. The department currently employs Chevrolet Tahoe SUVs for First Response and supervisory vehicles as well as an assortment of fully equipped but unmarked vehicles (Primarily Dodge Caravan and Ford Taurus) for senior management. Toronto Paramedic Services currently operates a fleet of custom built busses and equipment support vehicles for use during mass-casualty or large-scale events. Toronto Paramedic Services operates its own repair facilities, located at the service's Headquarters complex. All maintenance and repair work (with the exception of body work), and all equipment, radio, and medical electronics maintenance and repairs are performed on site by service staff.

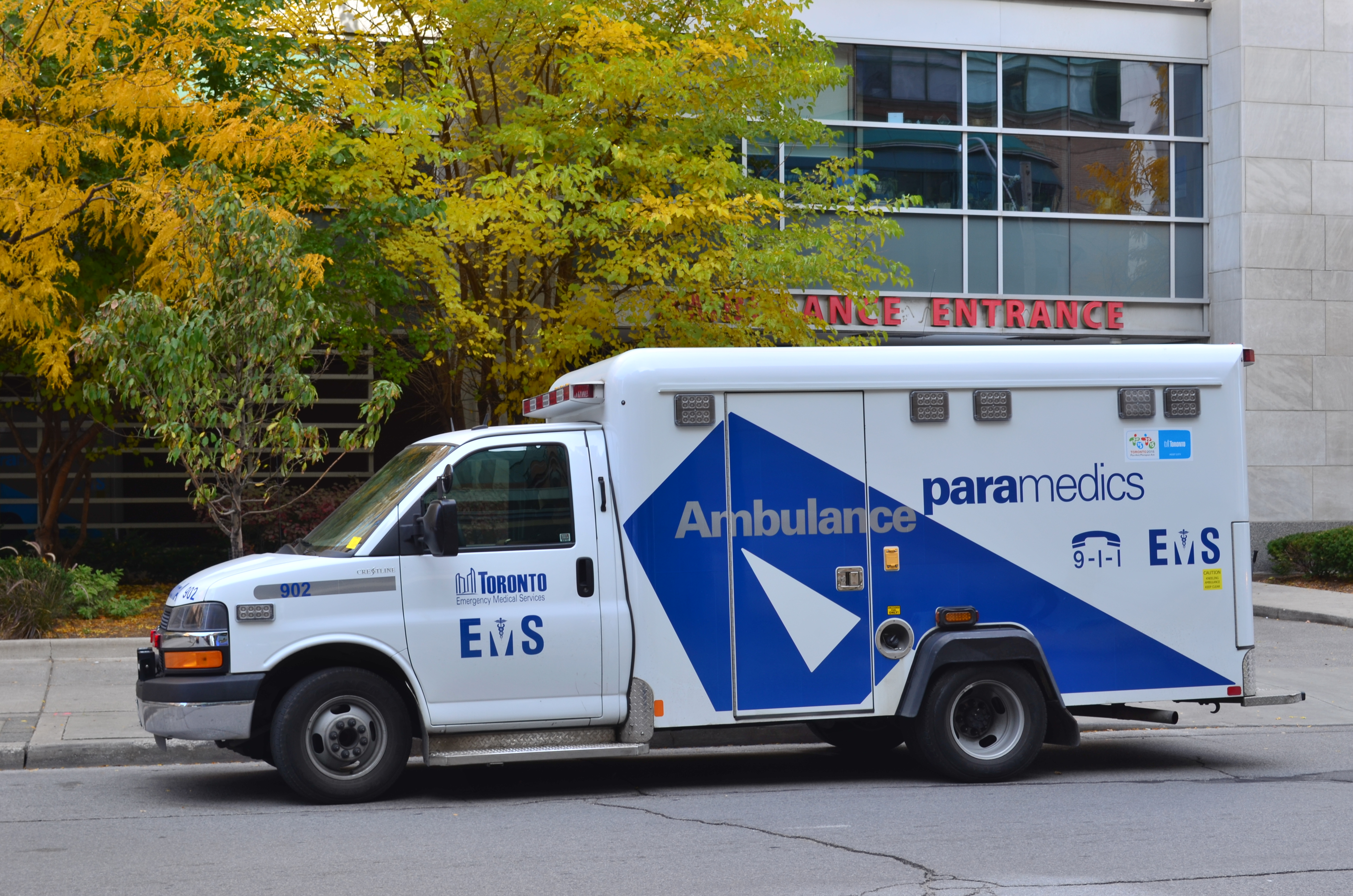
Type III Ambulance

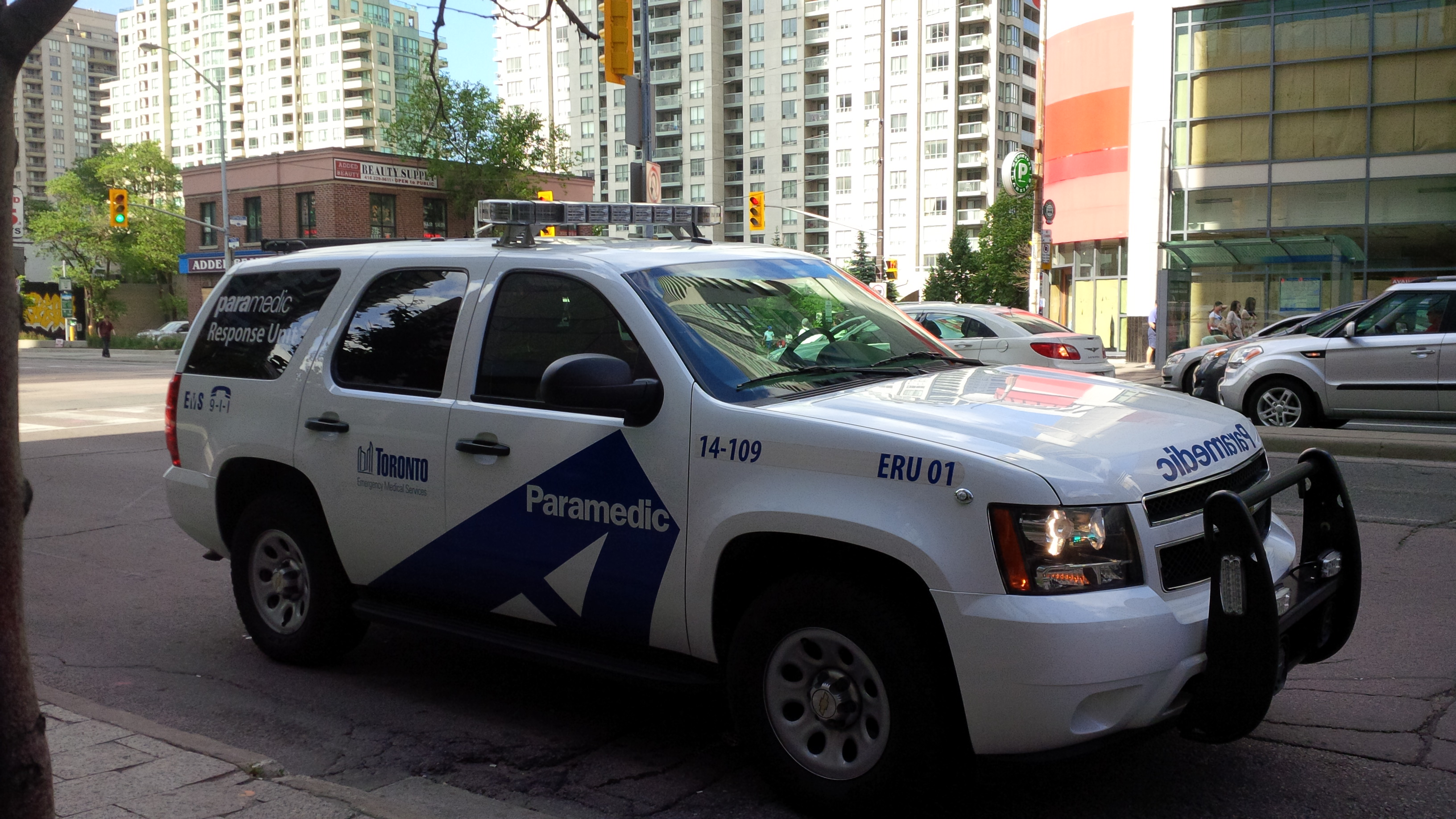
Emergency Response Unit

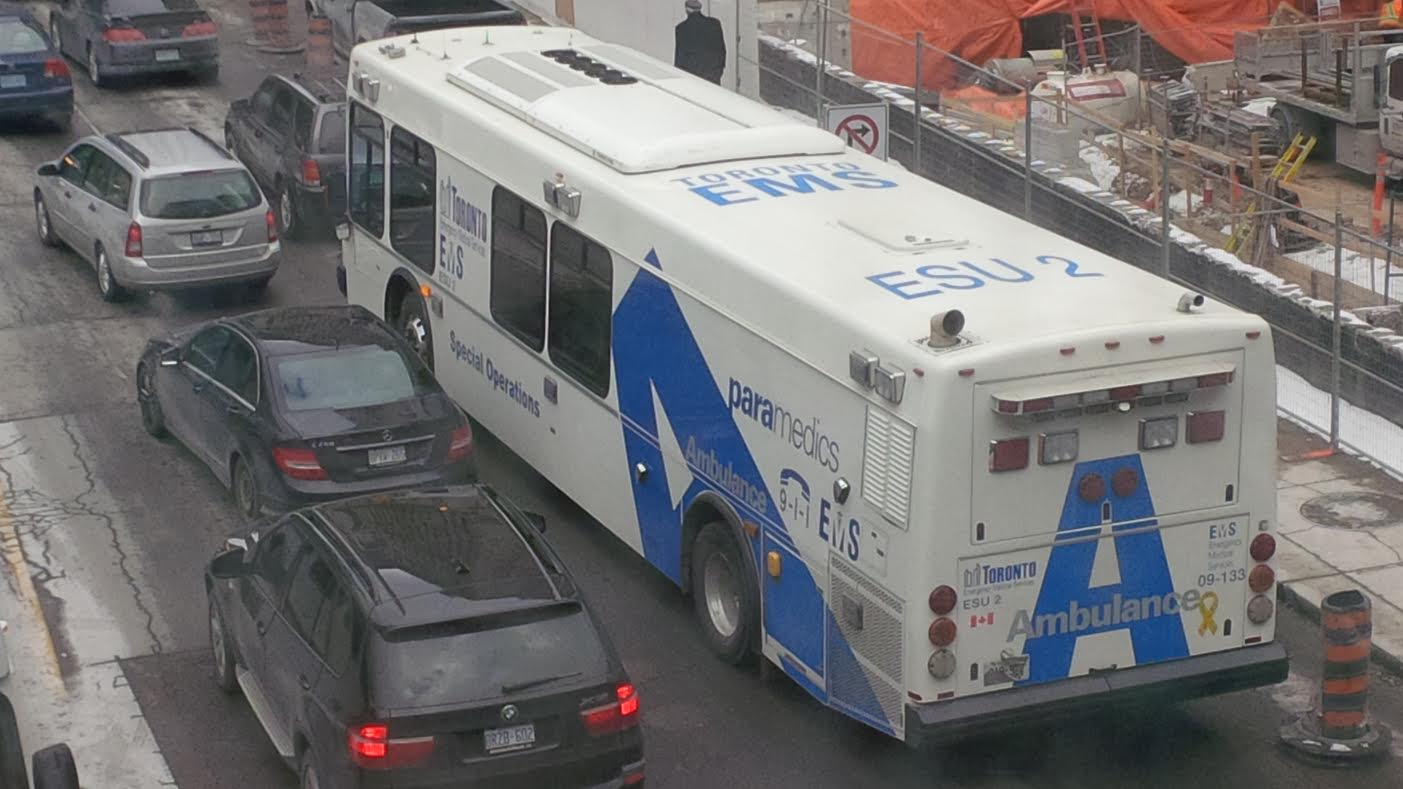
Multi-casualty transport unit

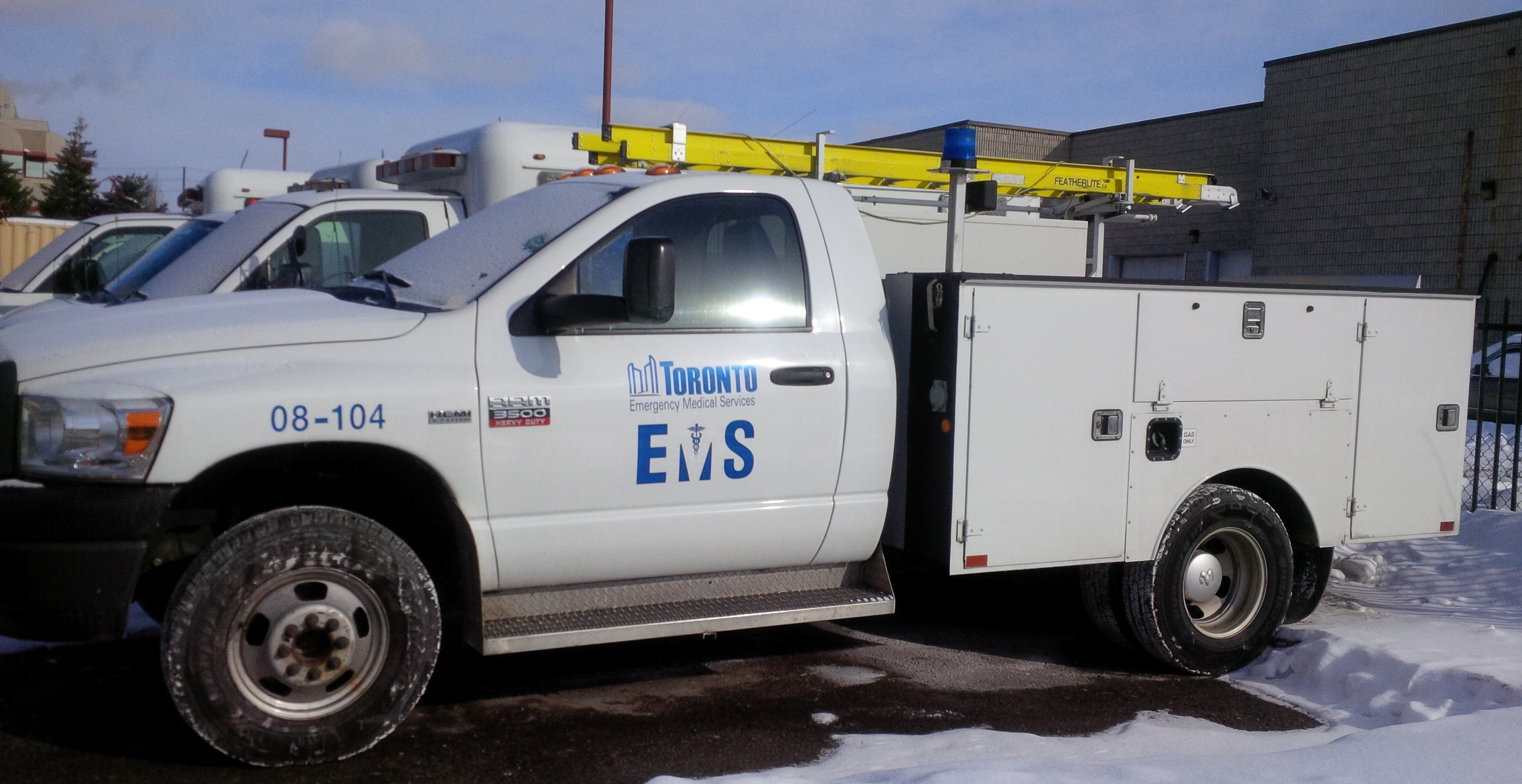
Special Operations utility unit

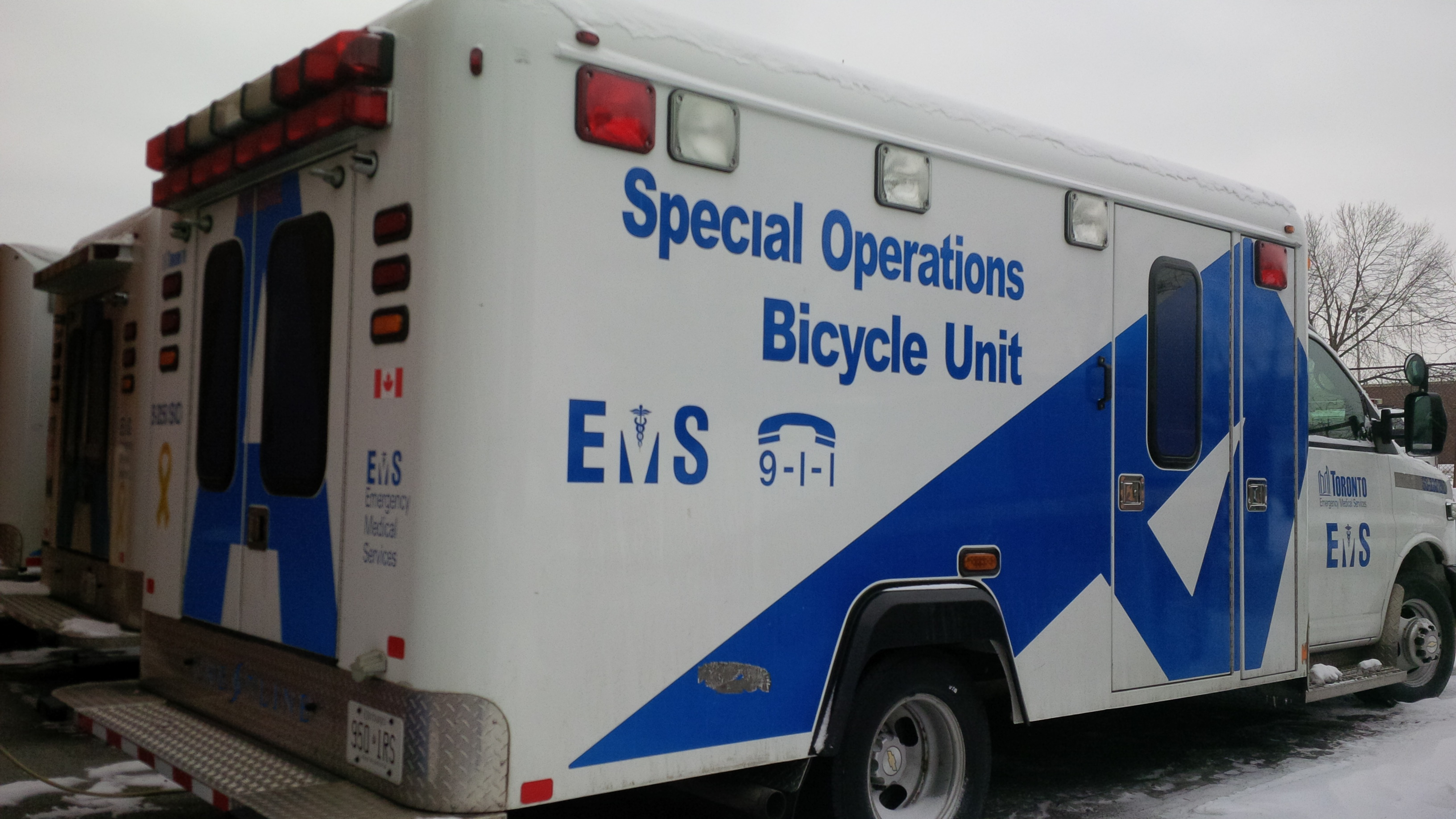
Bicycle transport unit

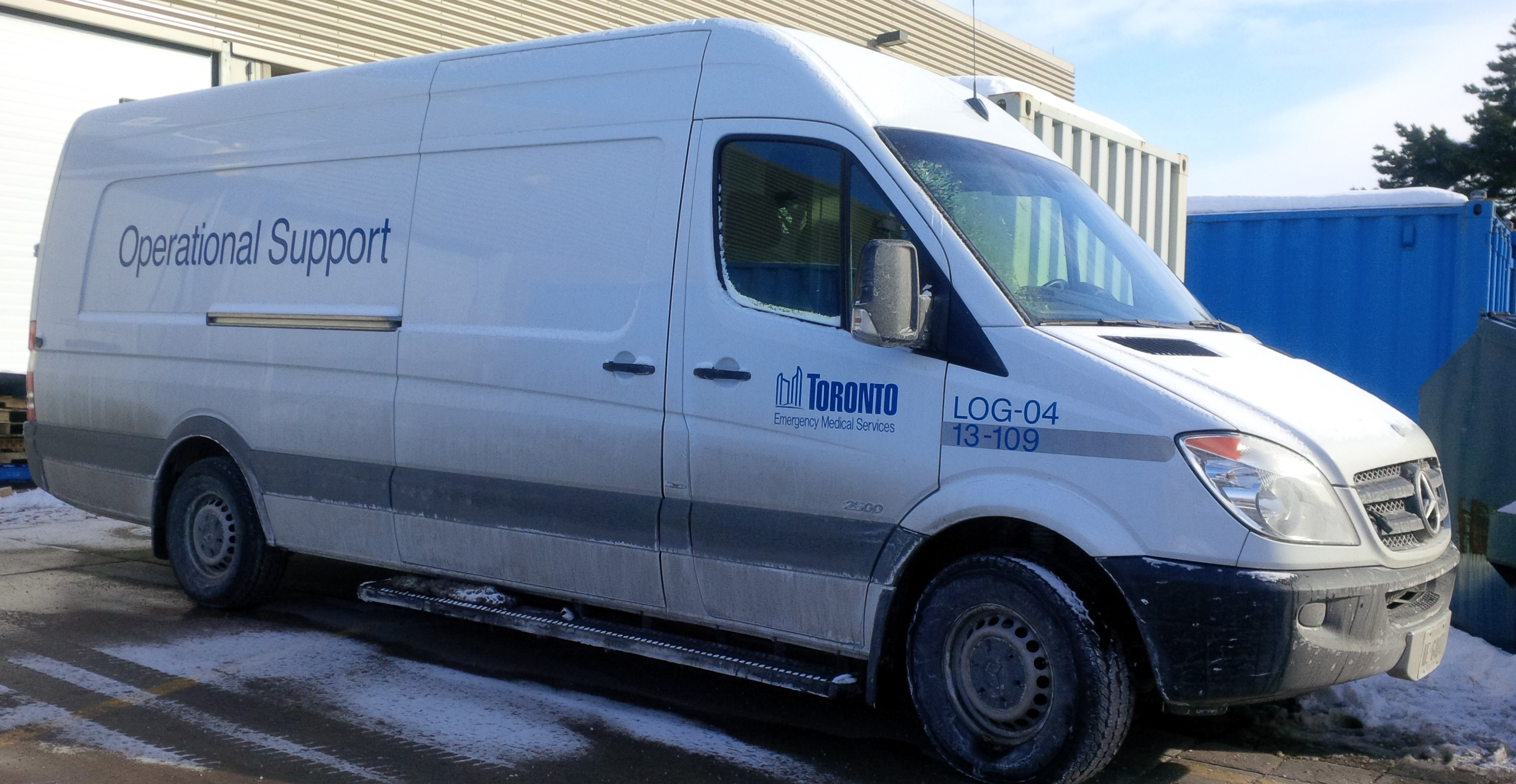
Operational Support unit

=== Fleet numbering ===
- 5XX - Paramedic Supervisor, Rapid Response, Special Operations
- 4XX,8XX - Ambulance, West
- 9XX - Ambulance, East
- ESUXX - Emergency Support Unit

=== Current fleet ===
Year	Make/Model	Type	Builder/Modification	Origin
2025–	Chevrolet Express Cutaway	Type III Ambulance	Crestline	Canada
2014–2016	Chevrolet Express Cutaway	Type III Ambulance	Crestline	Canada
2010	Ford E-Series	Type II Ambulance^{1}	Crestline	Canada
2013–2016	Chevrolet Tahoe	Supervisor/First Response	Rowland	United States
2016	Chevrolet Suburban	Supervisor^{2}	Rowland	United States
2016	Ford Taurus	Senior Command Staff^{3}		
2003	ElDorado National Escort RE-A	Multi Patient Emergency Response Vehicle	Crestline	United States
2008	ElDorado National Axess	Multi Patient Emergency Response Vehicle	Crestline	United States
2010	ElDorado National Axess	Multi Patient Emergency Response Vehicle	Crestline	United States
1992	MCI 102A2	Highway Coach^{4}	Ex GO Transit	Canada
2009	Chevrolet Kodiak C5500	24 Passenger Bus^{4}		United States
2003	Freightliner FL80	Emergency Support Unit	Walk-Around Rescue Body	Canada
2008	International Durastar	Emergency Support Unit	Cargo Body	United States
2010	Freightliner M2 106 Roll Back^{5}	Emergency Support Unit	Pod Truck	United States
	John Deere Gator	Special Events	Albion	United States
	Mikey Cart	Special Events	Albion	United States; Canada
1997–2000	Ford E-Series Cutaway Box Truck	Logistics	Stock	United States
2009	Chevrolet Kodiak C5500	Logistics	Stock	United States
2011–2013	Mercedes-Benz Sprinter	Logistics	Stock	Germany
2006–2012	Chevrolet 2500HD	Maintenance/Support	Plow/Salter	United States

2006 Orion Vii

^{1} One example in service on Toronto Islands due to road width restrictions
^{2} Special Operations
^{3} Unmarked, issued to senior operations staff
^{4} Used for transporting large groups/special teams for events or deployment
^{5} Equipped with multiple, mission specific pods

=== Historic/retired vehicles ===
Year	Make/Model	Type	Builder/Modification	Origin	Status
1908	Horse Drawn Wagon/Carriage	Ambulance	Petrolia Wagon Works	Canada	Static display^{1}
1954	Packard	Ambulance	Henney	United States	Working display / PR vehicle
1966	Pontiac Bonneville Wagon	Ambulance	Example	United States	Working display / PR vehicle
1971–1993^{2}	Dodge Ram Van	Type II Ambulance		United States	Working display / PR vehicle
1983–2003^{2}	Ford E350	Type II Ambulance	Various	United States	Retired
1990–2005^{2}	Ford E350 Cutaway Box	Type III Ambulance	Crestline	United States	Retired
1980	Plymouth Volare Wagon	First Response		United States	Retired
1993–2001^{2}	Jeep Cherokee	First Response		United States	Retired
2001	Ford Crown Victoria Police Interceptor	First Response/Management	Stock	Canada	Retired^{3}
2001–2006	Chevrolet Tahoe	First Response/Supervisor	Rowland	United States	Retired^{3}
1981	Chevrolet Impala Wagon	Supervisor/First Response	Stock	United States	Retired
1996–2000^{2}	Dodge Caravan	Supervisor	Stock	United States	Retired
1988	OBI 01.508	Emergency Communications Unit		Canada	Retired
1963	GMC TDH 4517	Ambulance Bus		United States; Canada	Retired
1980	OBI 01.504	Ambulance Bus		Canada	Retired
1980	OBI 01.502	Ambulance Bus		Canada	Retired
1981	OBI 01.502	Ambulance Bus		Canada	Retired
1982	OBI 01.502	Ambulance Bus		Canada	Retired
1986	OBI 01.508	Ambulance Bus		Canada	Retired
1988	OBI 02.501	Ambulance Bus		Canada	Retired
	GMC Step Van	Emergency Support Unit		United States	Retired
1987	Ford C800	Emergency Power Unit	100 kW Generator and Lighting Unit	United States	Retired
1985	Ford C800	Emergency Support Unit		United States	Retired
1976	Chevrolet Suburban	Emergency Support Unit	Off-Road Rescue	United States	Retired
1993	Ford F-450 Cutaway	Emergency Support Unit	Cargo Box	United States	Retired

^{1} Vehicle actually owned by Lambton County heritage museum. Previously on display at Toronto EMS HQ. Similar to vehicles that would have been operated in Toronto during Late 19th/Early 20th century. http://www.horsedrawnambulance.com
^{2}Multiple model years used by department until final retirement.
^{3} Examples may still be in service as utility vehicles

== Staff ==
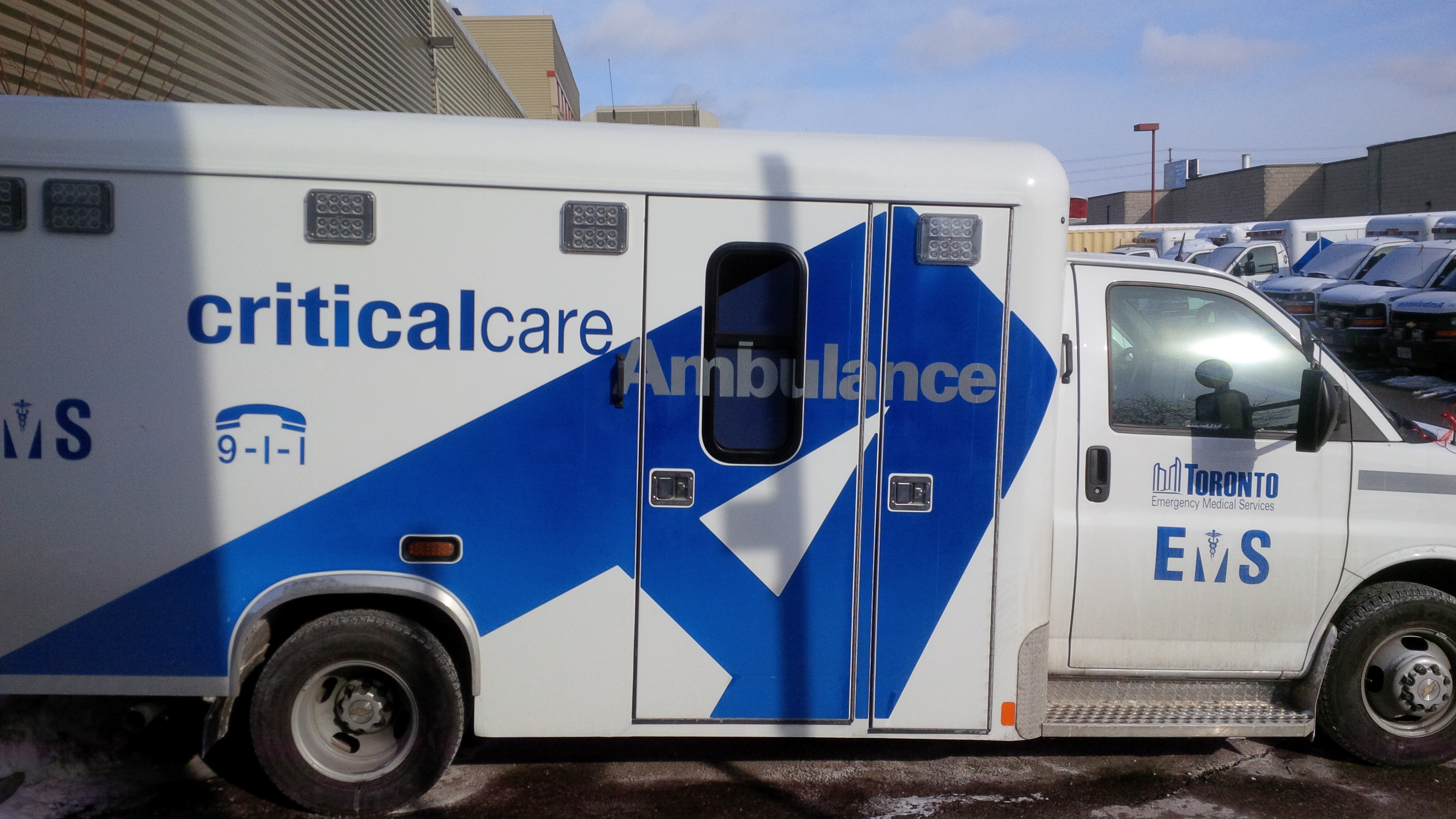
Critical Care Paramedic ambulance

Toronto Paramedic Services has 1500+ members including paramedics and other support staff. These are categorized as follows:

- Paramedics

- Level I - Primary Care Paramedic (PCP). Must complete 1,400 hours of training (2 year program) in a community college prior to employment. Successful completion of provincial certification exams is also required.
- Level II - Primary Care Paramedic Enhanced. Required an additional 572 hours of training in order to use an expanded skill set and scope of practice. Training for Level II is no longer done, as now Level I (PCP) medics get trained directly to Level III (ACP). This training encompasses all previously taught Level II skills.
- Level III - Advanced Care Paramedic (ACP). In addition to Level I training requires a further year of training in a community college; however Toronto trains its own ACPs using an internally developed, accredited accelerated 16 weeks long training program and 480 hours of preceptorship, this encompasses the entire year of college education.
- Level IV / CCTU - Critical Care Paramedic (CCP) - 23 positions. In addition to Level III training, CCTU requires an additional 18 months of training and 1008 hours of preceptorship. Typically work only on Critical Care Transport ambulances, pictured right.

Field Training Officers - Any level of paramedic with a silver “T”, these paramedics are responsible for educating, mentoring / providing guidance to fellow paramedics either in classroom, hospital clinical or on the road settings. Requires a minimum time practicing at their achieved levels as well as passing a written exam. Limited number of positions open at every level. Can precept anyone at their level or below, for example a ACP FTO can precept ACP in training or PCP.

Management structure and how to identify:

- Acting Supervisor: 2 stars
- Supervisor: 3 stars
- Deputy Commander - Duty Officer: crown
- Commander: crown + leaf
- Deputy Chief: crown + leaf x2
- Chief: crown + leaf x3

- Other staff

- Management staff - 72 positions.
- Support staff - 134 positions.
- Emergency Medical Dispatchers - 125 positions. (the Toronto Paramedic Services trains its own EMDs)
- Other support roles/not specified - 6 positions.

=== Chiefs ===
The Toronto Paramedic Services Chief is appointed by the Mayor of Toronto and oversees the operations, management, and supervision of the Toronto Paramedic Services.

Name	Tenure	Ref
Ron Kelusky	1998—2003	
Bruce Farr	2003—2011	
Paul Raftis	2011—2022	
Bikram Chawla	2022—present	

== Communications ==
Toronto Paramedic Services operates its own Communications and System Control Centre (called a Central Ambulance Communications Center or CACC "Kaack"), including emergency medical dispatch, patient distribution and system oversight. Toronto Paramedic Services participates in the community-wide 9-1-1 system, and triages emergency calls using the Advanced Medical Priority Dispatch System. The system uses Computer-Aided Dispatch, including Tritech VisiCAD, augmented by PDS and Optima Live software and technology. The service utilizes a satellite-based Automatic Vehicle Locating system in order to ensure that the closest appropriate response resource is consistently sent to each emergency call; all emergency response resources are included. The service utilizes a 700 MHz P25 Phase II trunking radio system for dispatch purposes. The Control Centre has direct landline contact with the 9-1-1 Center, all other emergency services, all acute care hospitals, and all Paramedic Stations. The service utilizes “Language Line” service to provide instant simultaneous translation of emergency calls in more than 140 languages. Toronto Paramedic Services operates the largest EMS Communications Centre in Canada, which was recently accredited as an International Centre of Excellence by the International Academy of Emergency Dispatch.

== Operations ==
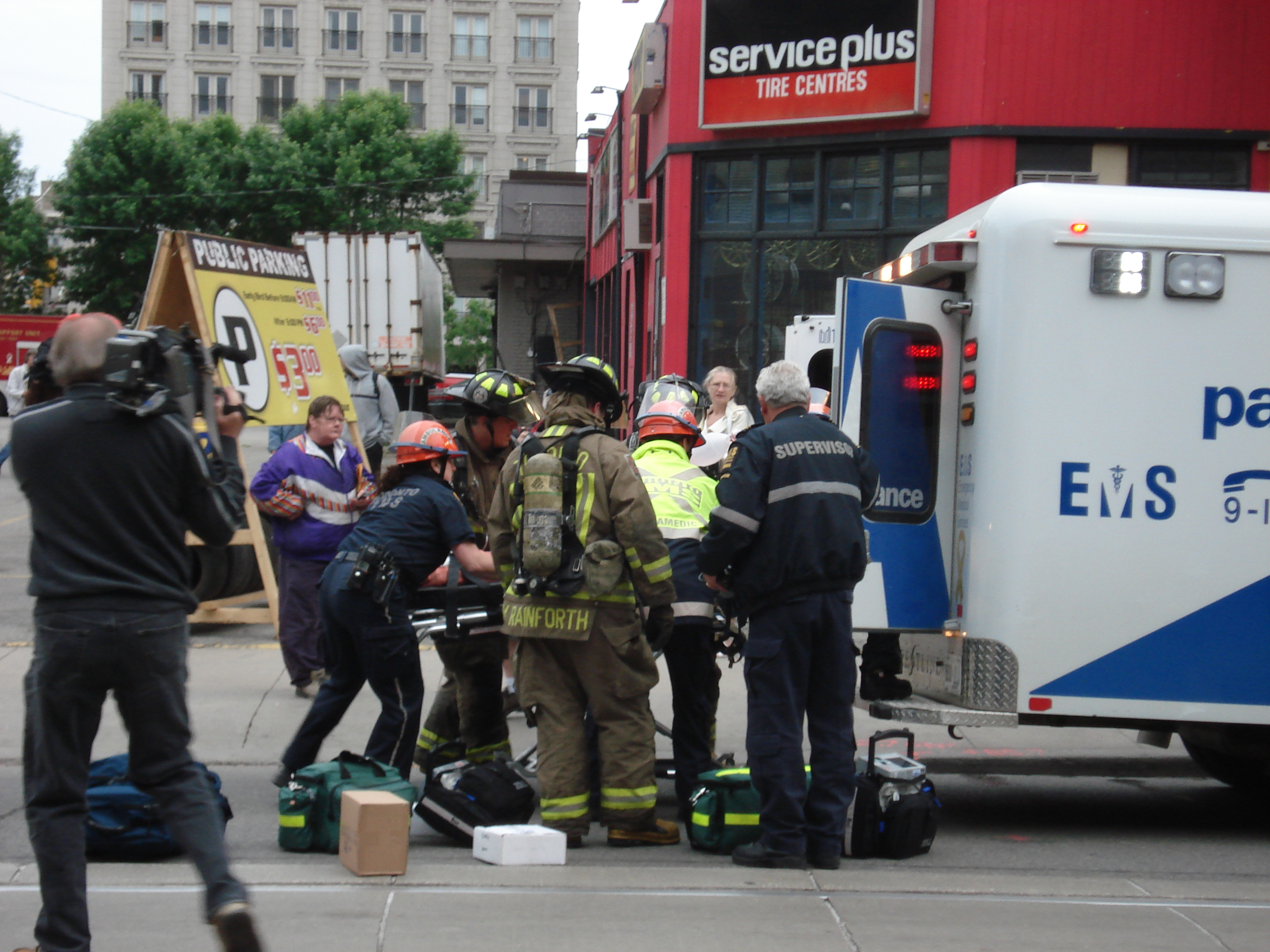
Paramedics prepare to transport patient.

Service is provided to a residential population of approximately 3.2 million people, which rises to approximately 5 million on most business days.

Toronto Paramedic Services operates a total of 41 stations, geographically distributed across the 640 km^{2} (246 sq mi) of the City of Toronto. Emergency service headquarters (which is shared with Toronto Fire Services, but both services operate independently) is located at 4330 Dufferin Street in Toronto. This facility includes administrative offices, some education facilities, the Communications Centre, Fleet Maintenance, Planning and Operational Support, and Materials Management/Logistics.The service is supplemented by well-developed Paramedic Services in neighbouring communities on three sides, with Lake Ontario providing the southern boundary of the service area. Air ambulance operations are provided within the City of Toronto by Ornge, a privately owned air ambulance contractor, under contract to the Government of Ontario.

Based upon information provided by Toronto Paramedic Services, the service processed in excess of 535,000 calls through its Control Centre in 2007 (the most recent year for which complete data is available), resulting in 223,769 emergency calls being dispatched. Using the AMPDS system, which triages calls by severity for dispatch purposes, the actual dispatch volume by category for that same year was:

Echo: 4,311
Delta: 76,595
Charlie: 31,126
Bravo: 64,572
Alpha: 36,674
Non-Emerg: 25,775

== Ambulance Stations (6 Districts + Special Operations) ==
=== District 1 - Northwest ===
The District 1 Hub is located at 01 Station (1300 Wilson Ave).

Station	Neighbourhood	Address	Vehicles Deployed	Notes
01 Multifunction Station	Downsview-Roding-CFB	1300 Wilson Ave	BLS, ALS, ARU/PRU, Supervisor, Logistics and Administrative	Post 01 & 01-Logistics in the same building, D1 Hub
12 Station	Mount Olive-Silverstone-Jamestown	1535 Albion Rd	ALS	N/A
13 Station	Willowridge-Martingrove-Richview	555 Martin Grove Rd	BLS	N/A
14 Station	West Humber-Clairville	321 Rexdale Blvd	BLS	N/A
15 Station	Glenfield-Jane Heights	2753 Jane St	ALS	Shared with Toronto Fire Station 142
17 Station/Post	Humber Summit	50 Toryork Dr	BLS, BLS New Hire FTO	N/A
19 Station	Weston	2015 Lawrence Ave W	BLS, ALS	Shared with Toronto Fire Station 442
51 Station	Humber Summit	61 Toryork Dr	61 Toryork Dr	Located in the Northwest quadrant but controlled by the Senior Dispatcher for Spec Ops

=== District 2 - Northeast ===
The District 2 Hub is located at 20 Station (2430 Lawrence Ave E).

Station	Neighbourhood	Address	Vehicles Deployed	Notes
20 Station	Dorset Park	2430 Lawrence Ave E	BLS, BLS New Hire FTO, ARU, Supervisor	D2 Hub
23 Station	Don Valley Village/Henry Farm	115 Parkway Forest Dr	ALS	Shared with Toronto Fire Station 115
24 Station	L'Amoreaux	3061 Birchmount Rd	BLS	N/A
25 Station	Rouge	8500 Sheppard Ave E	BLS, ALS	Shared with Toronto Fire Station 212
26 Station	West Hill	4331 Lawrence Ave E	ALS, ARU, BLS Spare	Shared with Toronto Police 43 Division
26 Post	Centennial Scarborough	5318 Lawrence Ave E	ARU	Shared with Toronto Fire Station 215
27 Station	Milliken/Malvern	900 Tapscott Rd	BLS	Shared with Toronto Fire Station 211
28 Station	Bendale	2900 Lawrence Ave E	BLS	N/A
29 Station	Agincourt	4560 Sheppard Ave E	ALS, ARU	Shared with Toronto Fire Station 243

=== District 3 - Southwest ===
The District 3 Hub is located at 30 Station (100 Turnberry Ave).

Station	Neighbourhood	Address	Vehicles Deployed	Notes
30 Station	Weston-Pelham Park	100 Turnberry Ave	BLS, PRU, Supervisor	D3 Hub
31 Station	Kingsway South	4219 Dundas St W	ALS, ARU	N/A
32 Station	High Park	9 Clendenan Ave	BLS	N/A
35 Station	Liberty Village/CNE Grounds	265 Manitoba Dr	BLS, Special Events Carts (Only during CNE)	N/A
37 Station	Parkdale	1288 Queen St W	BLS, ALS	N/A
38 Station	Alderwood	259 Horner Ave	BLS, ALS	N/A
39 Station	Islington-City Centre West	155 The East Mall	BLS	Shared with Toronto Fire Station 432

=== District 4 - Southeast ===
The District 4 Hub is located at 42 Station (1535 Kingston Rd).

Station	Neighbourhood	Address	Vehicles Deployed	Notes
21 Station	Wexford-Maryvale	887 Pharmacy Ave	BLS, ALS	N/A
22 Station	Scarborough Village	3100 Eglinton Ave E	BLS	N/A
41 Station	Broadview North / Thorncliffe Park	1300 Pape Ave	BLS, SickKids ACTS	N/A
42 Station	Birchcliffe-Cliffside	1535 Kingston Rd	BLS, ALS, Supervisor	D4 Hub
43 Station	South Riverdale	126 Pape Ave	BLS	N/A
46 Station	Danforth - East York	105 Cedarvale Ave	ALS	N/A
47 Station	Cliffcrest	3600 St Clair Ave E	BLS	N/A

=== District 5 - North Central ===
The District 5/Special Operation Hub is located at 55 Station (5700 Bathurst St).

Station	Neighbourhood	Address	Vehicles Deployed	Notes
11 Station	Yorkdale-Glen Park	1135 Caledonia Rd	BLS	N/A
18 Station	Forest Hill	643 Eglinton Ave W	BLS, ALS	N/A
53 Post	York University Heights	4330 Dufferin St	BLS	Book on at 01 Station.
54 Station	Clanton Park	4135 Bathurst St	CBRNE, CRU, ARU	Senior Dispatcher control for Spec Ops assignments
55 Post	Newtonbrook West	5700 Bathurst St	Supervisor	D5 & Spec Ops Hub. Shared with Toronto Fire Station 112.
56 Station	Newtonbrook East/Bayview Woods	3300 Bayview Ave	BLS	Shared with Toronto Fire Station 111.
57 Station	Bridle Path-Sunnybrook-York Mills	2075 Bayview Ave	ALS, BLS Spare	Located at the rear of Sunnybrook Health Sciences Centre.
58 Station	Willowdale	12 Canterbury Pl	ETF, TRU, CCTU, BLS	Shared with Toronto Fire Station 114. Senior Dispatcher control for Spec Ops assignments. BLS car book on at 01 station.

=== District 6 - South Central ===
The District 6 Hub is located at 34 Station (674 Markham St).

Station	Neighbourhood	Address	Vehicles Deployed	Notes
33 Station	Dovercourt-Wallace Emerson-Junction	760 Dovercourt Rd	ALS, BLS Spare	N/A
34 Station	Bloor-Annex	674 Markham St	BLS	D6 Hub, Safe City, Community Medicine
36 Station	Waterfront Communities	339 Queens Quay W	BLS, Marine Medic	Shared with Toronto Fire/Marine Station 334
40 Station	Church-Yonge Corridor	58 Richmond St E	BLS, ALS	N/A
45 Station	Yorkville	135 Davenport Rd	ALS, BLS Spare	N/A
59 Station	Toronto Islands	235 Cibola Ave	BLS	Shared with Toronto Fire Station 335.

== Special operations ==
In addition to regular operations, Toronto Paramedic Services staffs a Special Operations Division, tasked with the provision of Paramedic services in unusual circumstances. The elements of this unit include:

- Tactical Unit - Cross-trained paramedics providing medical support to the Toronto Police Emergency Task Force.
- Marine Unit - Cross-trained paramedics staffing the vessels of the Toronto Fire Services in order to provide support for Toronto Fire personnel and Paramedic services on the waters of Lake Ontario, and Paramedic service to the Toronto Islands.
- HUSAR - Specially-trained paramedics operate together with elements of the Toronto Fire Services, Toronto Police Service and Sunnybrook Health Sciences Centre Emergency Physicians to provide a joint-service Heavy Urban Search and Rescue team.
- CBRNE (Chemical, Biological, Radioactive, Nuclear & Explosive) - Specially-trained paramedics operate together with elements of the Toronto Police Service and Toronto Fire Services to provide a joint-service Terrorism/Hazardous Materials Response team.
- Public Safety Unit - Cross-trained paramedics providing medical support to the Toronto Police Public Order Unit
- Emergency Response Unit - Single paramedics in SUVs, tasked solely with response to high priority emergency calls.
- Bicycle Unit - Paramedics equipped with mountain bikes, capable of providing either BLS or ALS services in off-road areas, or at special events. Team also works in concert with the Toronto Police bike team to provide first response capabilities in the Entertainment District on weekend nights.
- Emergency Support Unit - Paramedics trained to operate the service's busses and equipment trucks. These respond to all potential Mass Casualty Incidents (fires, multi-patient car accidents etc...), support for large crowd situations such as festivals and parades as well as responding to all calls involving aircraft at Toronto Pearson International Airport
- Critical Care Transport Unit / Team (CCTU) - Highly specialized paramedics responsible for moving extremely critical patients requiring ICU level care between hospitals; such as from regional hospitals to specialized neuro, trauma and cardiac centres. CCTU is also southern Ontario’s regional ECMO transfer team, responsible for moving patients on life saving ECMO care; covering southern Ontario from Windsor to Sudbury to Ottawa. Recognizable by their distinctive red sleeved uniform shirts and marked Toronto Critical Care Paramedic ambulances.

== Challenges ==
Hospital in-patient beds and Emergency Departments tend to be severely overcrowded, resulting in difficulties for paramedics transferring the care of their patients to hospital staff in a timely manner. Two- to four-hour delays in the transfer of care are commonplace, and six- to eight-hour delays are not unheard of. When this occurs, the service's ability to provide service to emergency calls in a timely manner will often degrade, because of decreased unit availability. Multiple stakeholders and various levels of government are currently seeking solutions to this problem, but have, so far, experienced only limited success.

The funding for Toronto Paramedic Services occurs as a result of a mixed formula, with fifty percent of funding coming from the municipal tax base and fifty percent from the provincial government. The funding of Toronto Paramedic Services is based upon its census population, not its business day population. As a result, there are always more people requiring EMS services than the system has been funded for.

Language barriers and cultural misperceptions in Toronto's multicultural landscape are commonplace for Toronto's paramedics. The service subscribes to Language Line, a simultaneous telephone-based translation service which operates in more than 140 languages. This service is used by Emergency Medical Dispatchers processing 9-1-1 calls, or by paramedics treating patients in the field, on a daily basis. The service also operates its own ethnocultural access program.

The 'Baby Boom' generation is aging. As it does so, all of those 'boomers' become net consumers of health care, driving up demand for services. Simultaneously, all of those 'boomers' employed by the service in the early 1970s are reaching the end of their careers and retiring. Since subsequent generations are typically much smaller, the service is experiencing difficulty in recruiting suitably trained replacement staff, just as demand for services is increasing.

== Research ==
Over the years, the presence of such a large system and call volume, along with a commitment to consistently capture high quality data, has permitted Toronto EMS to become a 'test-bed' for research projects involving both EMS and emergency medicine. This has resulted in a service which is extremely research-oriented and interested in outcome-based medicine. While this has provided any number of research opportunities for physicians and emergency medicine residents through the Sunnybrook Centre for Prehospital Medicine (the Base Hospital), it has also permitted paramedics to function as supporting and as lead researchers, and in some cases, as the principal researcher of their own projects. All research conducted at Toronto EMS is pre-approved by the University of Toronto Research Ethics Committee, and the findings of research conducted at Toronto EMS, by both physicians and paramedics, has been published in respected, peer-reviewed, international journals.

== Community involvement ==
Toronto paramedics are heavily involved in various community programs and partnerships. Toronto's paramedics are active participants in the community which they serve. At the 'grass roots' level, Toronto's paramedics and EMDs fund a children's breakfast club, ensuring a nutritious breakfast for the children who live in several of the city's housing projects. Paramedics also participate in a variety of other events in the community, including their enthusiastic (and occasionally successful) participation in the dragon boat races staged annually by the city's Chinese community. As another little known fact of community involvement by paramedics, all of the floats in the city's annual Santa Claus Parade (one of North America's largest), are driven by volunteers from Toronto Paramedic Services, including both paramedics and a variety of other staff.

== See also ==
Paramedicine in Canada

- List of EMS Services in Ontario
- Paramedics in Canada
- Emergency Medical Services in Canada

Emergency Services in Toronto

- Toronto Police Service
- Toronto Fire Services

Employee association

- Toronto Paramedic Association
