= Disaster Assistance Response Team =

Canadian Armed Forces unit, created 1996

The Disaster Assistance Response Team (DART) (French: Équipe d'intervention en cas de catastrophe (EICC)) is a rapidly deployable team of 200 Canadian Forces personnel. It provides assistance to disaster-affected regions for up to 40 days. DART's headquarters is located in Kingston, Ontario.

== History ==
DART was created by the Canadian government in 1996 in the aftermath of the inadequate response to the 1994 Rwandan genocide, when Canada's aid arrived after the peak of a cholera epidemic. The government determined that it would be of the utmost importance in many disasters if it was able to rapidly deploy a group of people until long-term aid arrived.

DART has an annual budget of CA$500,000, although during specific incidents the Parliament of Canada can choose to temporarily allocate millions of dollars to DART to fund their response effort. For example, Operation Torrent, the aid mission to Turkey in the wake of the 1999 earthquake which left 17,000 people dead, saw CA$15 million used by DART in the response.

== Missions ==
The Canadian government decides whether or not to send DART after it has received a request from a country or the United Nations. Typically, upon a request from the government of the affected country, the Canadian government will dispatch its four to seven-person Canadian Disaster Assessment Team (CDAT). The CDAT members are from Global Affairs Canada and the Department of National Defence (DND). For all humanitarian assistance/DART missions Global Affairs Canada is the lead department representing the Government of Canada. The CDAT will assess the situation and submit its recommendations back to the Government (of Canada), who will decide if DART can or cannot be of assistance. If it agrees to provide assistance, it will dispatch an additional group of 12-19 personnel who form the Humanitarian Assistance Reconnaissance Team (HART) who will make preparations to receive the remainder of the team into the affected area.

=== Critiques ===
Although DART's goals may be well-intended there have been critiques of this program. It is costly, which comes with the nature of military intervention. Furthermore, although it does align with Canada's foreign policy of the three Ds (defence, diplomacy, and development) it does not help with the global health inequity.

=== Operation Central (Honduras), 1998 ===
In October 1998, Hurricane Mitch, a category-5 hurricane, struck Central America over a period of three days. As a result, 6,000 people died and over a million were missing or made homeless. DART situated themselves in the middle of the Rio Aguan Valley, in north-central Honduras. Because there were many isolated communities that were connected only by then-broken roads and bridges, DART was supported by four CH-146 Griffon helicopters from Canadian Forces Base Petawawa. By the end of the mission in mid-December 1998, DART had delivered 250,000 pounds of food and medical supplies throughout the valley. They also produced thousands of litres of clean drinking water and chlorinated local wells supporting approximately 15,000 people. Working with the medical personnel in Honduras, DART treated about 7,500 patients for ailments such as respiratory infections, conjunctivitis, skin infections, diarrhoea, parasitic infections and intestinal infections. It also helped repair roads, schools, bridges and electrical systems.

=== Operation Torrent (Turkey), 1999 ===
DART responded to a 7.4-magnitude earthquake that hit north-western Turkey on August 17, 1999. DART was deployed on the following day and set up a camp in Serdivan, a suburb of Adapazarı, which had 180,000 people. During this mission, DART personnel along with engineers from 5 Canadian Mechanized Brigade Group assisted in cleaning up a school, restoring electricity and designing and constructing a tented camp which could hold 2,500 people. This camp also had washroom and shower facilities. DART treated 5,000 patients and produced 2.5 million litres of bulk water.

=== Operation Structure (Sri Lanka), 2004 ===
DART responded to the 2004 Indian Ocean earthquake and tsunami that occurred on December 26, 2004. The reconnaissance team left for Colombo, Sri Lanka, on December 30, 2004. A commercial plane carried a reconnaissance crew with representatives from Foreign Affairs Canada (three), Canadian International Development Agency (two), Public Health Agency (one), and DART itself (six). Prime Minister Paul Martin announced his plans to send DART into the region on January 2, 2005. Four days later, a plane carrying 150 DART members departed for Ampara, Sri Lanka. On January 8, 2005, 50 more members arrived. Sri Lanka suffered tremendously as a result of the earthquake, the Canadian government stated that their relief efforts were to be concentrated there. They set up their main camp in a former sugar factory.

Ampara is cited as being one of the most affected by the tsunami. The Canadian government estimates that 105,560 out of the 600,000 people living in the city had been forced to seek temporary shelter. An estimated 10,400 deaths occurred as a result of the earthquake. The DART team brought four water purification units, which can provide up to 200,000 litres of clean water per day. It also provided primary medical care, some special engineering capabilities, and communications between DART, Sri Lanka and other relief organizations. The mission was expected to last six weeks. Their first task was to supply hospitals with potable water, (which they hoped to achieve by using their water purification units, which can purify 150,000 to 200,000 litres per day). Thus far, DART has treated 5,800 patients and produced more than 2.5 million litres of purified water. They have also helped repair schools, clear rubble, build temporary shelters and repair fishing boats and water mains in Sri Lanka.

The lack of an immediate response by what was supposed to be a rapid-response unit aroused significant criticism. Although the DART team was ready to leave within 24 hours of when the disaster struck, the government took two days to announce that the team would be dispatched, and it took nearly two weeks for DART to actually leave for Sri Lanka, due to a lack of available air transport. These delays notwithstanding, the DART chief, Michael Voith, commended DART's work, saying: "What I can tell you after this mission is the organization of the DART that we have right now ... is a sound organization, it brings an incredible capability to a disaster area". John Watson of CARE Canada, responded by calling the operation an "amateur" response. Voith dismissed these remarks, saying that the team filled a "critical void." DART supporters have also noted that the initial response (i.e. digging people out of collapsed buildings, providing surgery/immediate serious trauma care for the injured), is not a DART responsibility. This is apparent from the fact that they do not have trauma surgeons, SAR assets, firefighters or other professionals who would be of critical importance during the very first days after a disaster. Rather, the job of DART is to mitigate the impact of the lack of critical infrastructure after a disaster.

=== Operation Plateau (Pakistan), 2005 ===
DART responded to the magnitude 7.6 2005 Kashmir earthquake on October 8, 2005. On October 14, three days after a nine-member Canadian delegation left to assess the situation, Prime Minister Paul Martin announced that DART would be going to the Muzaffarabad region of Pakistan. The reconnaissance team arrived on October 16, the main force two days later. By December 9 all DART personnel had returned to Canada.

DART distributed 500 tonnes of humanitarian aid supplies and purified and distributed 3,811,535 litres of drinking water.

The team also provided medical treatment for 11,782 people, including:

- 7,000 who received care from mobile medical teams airlifted by helicopter to their isolated communities.
- 2,637 who received care at the DART clinic in Gahri Dupatta.
- 2,145 who were immunized against a variety of contagious diseases.

The value of the operation, as well as its cost-effectiveness, was criticized for its excessive emphasis on technological solutions rather than on broader local primary-care needs - a type of criticism that Canada's emergency response has received as early as its relief operations in 1985 following the Mexico City earthquake and more specifically in regards to the belated deployment of DART in 2004 to the Asia-Pacific tsunami disaster (see Operation Structure (Sri Lanka), 2004). It is suggested that rapidly deploying human resources in order for health to reach victims in the shortest possible time would have been the most efficient and most cost-effective form of response.

=== Operation Hestia (Haiti), 2010 ===
DART deployed to Haiti to assist in the recovery effort after a massive earthquake hit the country in January 2010. While there, they worked in tandem with 12,000 US MINUSTAH and 2,000 Canadian troops, mainly from 5 Canadian Mechanized Brigade Group). Following an initial assessment and relief work near Port-au-Prince, the DART team began to concentrate their efforts on the area surrounding Jacmel on January 18, 2010.

=== Operation Renaissance 13-01 (Philippines) 2013 ===
On November 11, 2013, DART sent 43 members to assist in the relief effort to the Philippines to assist in the relief effort after Typhoon Haiyan and 54 more members are on the way. Deployment of the DART was completed on December 18. DART capabilities included engineering road clearance, medical assistance through Medical Mobile teams (MMT) and water purification. Operations are concentrated on Panay Island.

=== Operation Renaissance 15-1 (Nepal) 2015 ===
On April 26, 2015, DART deployed 200 personnel to assist with the engineering, medical aid and mapping in Nepal after the 7.8 magnitude earthquake struck.

== See also ==
- Disaster Assistance and Rescue Team, an elite team within the Singapore Civil Defence Force
- Canadian Forces Search and Rescue, domestic SAR
- Heavy Urban Search and Rescue, a SAR team consisting of members of Toronto Fire Services, Toronto EMS and Toronto Police Service
- Canadian Medical Assistance Team, a grassroots humanitarian relief organization, consisting of physicians, surgeons, nurse practitioners, nurses and paramedics from across Canada.
