= Inversion table =

Inversion table may refer to:

- An object used in inversion therapy
- A list of numbers encoding a permutation
