= Urban Search and Rescue South Carolina Task Force 1 =

SC-TF1 patch.

Urban Search and Rescue South Carolina Task Force 1, or SC-TF1, is an urban search and rescue task force that is sponsored by the South Carolina Firefighter Mobilization Committee, which was created by the South Carolina Firefighter Mobilization Act of 2000.

The committee is made up of fire service representatives, the State Emergency Management Director, the State Forestry Director, and a representative from a county Emergency Management agency. It is a part of the State Emergency Operations Plan and can deploy within South Carolina, or out of state through existing mutual aid agreements or through the Emergency Management Assistance Compact.

SC-TF1 meets and in most cases exceeds the staffing and equipment to the NIMS/FEMA recommendations for Type I urban search and rescue task forces, including robust search, rescue, planning, HAZMAT/WMD, medical and logistics sections capable of self-sustained 24-hour heavy rescue operations for over 72 hours and for deployments of up to 10 days. It is a founding member of the State Urban Search and Rescue Alliance (SUSAR) which is a network of North American state and commonwealth urban search and rescue resources that formed after a meeting in South Carolina in 2005.

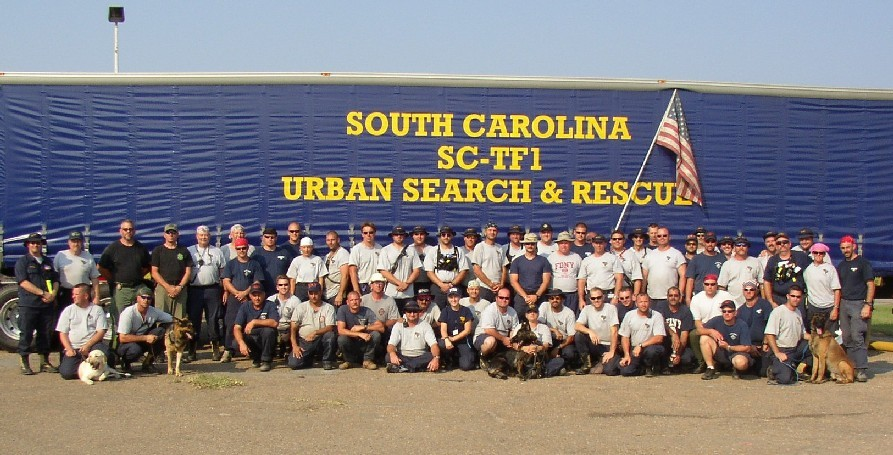
Urban Search and Rescue South Carolina Task Force 1

SC-TF1 was one of the first state urban search and rescue resources to be deployed into St. Tammany Parish and St. Bernard Parish, Louisiana, after Hurricane Katrina in September, 2005.

There are five regional building collapse search and rescue teams that are part of the South Carolina Firefighter Mobilization plan but not part of SC-TF1. They are located in Charleston, Greenville, Hilton Head Island, Myrtle Beach, and Columbia.

== Deployments ==
- April 21, 2008 – Local, regional, state and military emergency crews conducted a full-scale disaster response simulation in Beaufort County. This five-day-long exercise involved nearly 2,345 military and civilian personnel responding to a mock earthquake scenario with partially collapsed buildings and trapped victims. SC-TF1 responded by deploying their 75-man Type I task force to the area for a four-day deployment.
- SC-TF1 was legally deployed by the State of Louisiana on September 2, 2005 to assist in search and rescue operations for Hurricane Katrina. In joint operations with St. Tammany Fire District, St. Tammany Parish Sheriff's Office, and the Alabama Search and Rescue Task Force, SC-TF1 was part of the effort that moved more than 2,800 people to safety (250 of whom were in immediate peril), and searched 25,000 homes and businesses in 9 days.

== In the news ==
- SC-TF1 personnel were interviewed as they practiced for WMD response with other South Carolina first responders on June 1, 2005.
- Members of SC-TF1 were interviewed while on deployment in St. Tammany Parish on CBS's The Early Show with Tracy Smith on September 8, 2005.
- SC-TF1 was featured in the ETV and PBS documentary special "Care from the heart." Video clips: Dial-up. Broadband.

Fast-forward to 10:45 and 22.55.

- SC-TF1 personnel met with New York Mayor and candidate for the 2008 United States Presidential race Rudy Giuliani and were interviewed with other South Carolina first responders on February 21, 2007.
- SC-TF1 deployed to Mt. Pleasant, SC "earthquake" exercise to test response to disasters on June 6, 2007.
- SC-TF1 deployed to Beaufort, SC for the 2008 Vigilant Guard Exercise to test their operation readiness for 2008.
