= Batmanning =

Batmanning may refer to:

- Inversion therapy in unusual places or through unusual means
- A planking variant
