= Ambulance car =

Ambulance car may refer to:

- Ambulance
- Nontransporting EMS vehicle
- Hospital car
