= State Urban Search and Rescue Alliance =

State Urban Search and Rescue Alliance (SUSAR) logo

The State Urban Search and Rescue Alliance or SUSAR is a non-profit organization designed to promote and support state urban search and rescue teams across the United States.

== Background ==
SUSAR started informally with discussion between the task force leaders of several states, including South Carolina, New Jersey, Connecticut, Maryland, Georgia, Oklahoma, and Illinois. They decided that state level teams would benefit from a more formal exchange of ideas. The first meeting was in South Carolina in July 2005, and 18 states were represented, as well as Puerto Rico. By the second meeting the group had grown to 26 states. The State Urban Search and Rescue Alliance was formally adopted in August 2006 in Charlotte, North Carolina. As of March 2007, 41 states have joined the Alliance. The ninth meeting and conference will take place November 8–10, 2011 in Oklahoma City, Oklahoma.

== Statement of purpose ==
Support and conduct research, education, and informational activities to benefit the communities served by state-level US&R teams; to provide teams a voice in the US&R community; to stimulate the exchange of information among persons and organizations thus engaged in US&R and to disseminate such information; and to develop, adopt, and utilize standards for participants and teams engaged in US&R.

== Board of trustees ==
- Chairman R.B. Ellis - Oklahoma
- Vice-chairman Scott Merbach – Maryland
- Secretary-Treasurer Tina Toney - Oregon
- Doug Cooper - Alabama
- Scott Pierson – Illinois
- James Bastan - New Jersey
- Ronnie Register – Georgia
- Ron Zawlocki – Michigan
- David Martin – Texas
- Brian Toolan - Connecticut
- Dirk Christian – Kansas
- Ken Craft - Florida

== See also ==
- Urban Search and Rescue
- Urban Search and Rescue South Carolina Task Force 1
- FEMA Urban Search and Rescue Task Force
