= Toronto (CAN-TF3) Heavy Urban Search and Rescue =

Heavy Urban Search and Rescue / Canada Task Force 3
Agency overview
- Formed: 2001
- Preceding agency: Toronto Fire Services, Toronto Paramedic Services
- Jurisdiction: Toronto
- Headquarters: Toronto
- Employees: 130
- Annual budget: CAD $500,000 (2018)
- Agency executive: Matthew Pegg, Fire Chief, Toronto Fire Services
- Child agency: Toronto Fire Hazmat Team
- Website: HUSAR

HUSAR is the Toronto Heavy Urban Search and Rescue unit CAN-TF3 - an urban search and rescue unit able to respond to disaster situations at a city, provincial and national level, as well as offer international assistance.

CAN-TF3 is operated by Toronto Fire Services, in collaboration with Toronto Police Service and Toronto EMS created to deal with search and rescue operations in the City of Toronto. This specialized unit was created following the September 11 attacks in New York City, United States and allows the city to deal with large-scale disasters. The unit can respond to situations outside of the city, and offer provincial, national, as well as international assistance.

The cities of Vancouver, Calgary, and the province of Manitoba, also currently have, or are developing, similar interoperable Heavy USAR capacity.

== Roles and responsibilities ==
- Search and Rescue
- Emergency Medical Services
- Planning & Technical Information
- Logistics
- Command

== Equipment ==
Product list and details
Make/Model	Type	Purpose	Origin
Ford F250	van	OSU-1 Search & Communications	ex-Toronto Paramedic Services 927 Type 2 ambulance
Ford F600/Dependable Emergency Equipment	truck	OSU-2 Incident Support Unit	ex-East York Fire Department Rescue # 2
Ford Louisville 9000	tractor and trailer	OSU-3 Base of Operations	ex-commercial trailer
1990s Volvo VHD	roll on-off truck	OSU-4 (Shoring Unit)	ex-City of Toronto Works Department truck
Ford 3500 series	bus	OSU-5 Search Dog Unit	ex-school bus
Western Star CNV	tractor and trailer	OSU-6 Rescue Unit	ex-pop deliver truck
Princeton Piggyback/BIC Hydraulics	All Terrain Forklift	Support Units	
Argo Response	ATV	all terrain transport	
John Deere Gator TH 6X4	ATV	field transport	
MCI 102 Highway Coach	bus	personnel transport	ex-GO Transit bus

== Deployments ==
A list of major deployments of CAN-TF3:

- December 2020 - London, Ontario building collapse
- June 2016 - Mississauga natural gas explosion
- June 2012 - Collapse of the Algo Centre Mall roof/parking structure in Elliot Lake, Ontario
- August 2011 - Goderich Tornado
- April 2003 - Bloor Street West natural gas explosion in Toronto

== See also ==
- Toronto Fire Services
- Toronto EMS
- Toronto Police Service
- Toronto Office of Emergency Management
- Disaster Assistance Response Team and Canadian Forces Search and Rescue
- Urban Search and Rescue New York Task Force 1

=== Other similar units ===
- Vancouver (CAN-TF1) Heavy Urban Search and Rescue
- Calgary (CAN-TF2) Heavy Urban Search and Rescue
- Manitoba (CAN-TF4) Heavy Urban Search and Rescue
- Halifax (CAN-TF5) Heavy Urban Search and Rescue
  - Halifax Regional Search and Rescue
  - Halifax Regional Fire and Emergency
