= @fire International Disaster Response Germany =

German civil protection organisation

- @fire Internationaler Katastrophenschutz Deutschland
- Main logo of @fire
- Abbreviation: @fire
- Formation: 2002 (24 years ago)
- Type: NGO
- Headquarters: Osnabrück
- Volunteers: 300
- Website: www.at-fire.de/

@fire International Disaster Response Germany (@fire Internationaler Katastrophenschutz Deutschland) is a German non-profit, non-governmental civil protection organisation which assists during natural disasters. The organisation was founded in 2002 in Wallenhorst, Germany as a pro bono network of professional and volunteer firefighters. Since 2010 @fire is member of the UN-Organisation INSARAG (International Search and Rescue Advisory Group).

== Tasks ==
The aid organization is specialized in international USAR (Urban Search and Rescue) and wildland firefighting operations.

=== Urban search and rescue ===
During Urban search and rescue operations, @fire is acting on the INSARAG-Guidelines and is therefore prepared to deploy a fully equipped team within 36 hours after an official request for international aid by the host country.

In order to locate victims buried beneath the rubble, the search teams are equipped with acoustic and optical search devices as well as search and rescue dogs.

To extract located victims the rescue squad uses larger-scale equipment such as concrete chain saws, rotary cutting tools and core drilling machines.

=== Wildland firefighting ===
@fire is able to rapidly deploy small wildland firefighting hand crews to support local firefighting agencies during serious wildfires.

Those crews are trained to fight fires with a minimum amount of water by using hand tools and small pickup-based tankers.

== Members ==
@fire Members are volunteers from Germany, Switzerland and Austria. Most Members are volunteer or professional firefighters, but also paramedics and members of the "Technisches Hilfswerk" (Federal Agency for Technical Relief, THW) participate in the network.

All members are specially trained for their scope e.g. the technical search of trapped victims. This training is based on the training the members already received in the fire department, following the INSARAG-Guidelines and the specifications of the National Wildfire Coordinating Group (National Wildfire Coordinating Group).

== Operations ==
- 2005 Kashmir earthquake
- Wildfires in the USA 2005, 2006, 2007, 2009, 2010 und 2011
- Wildfires in Portugal 2006, 2007, 2011, 2012 und 2013
- 2010 Haiti earthquake
- 2013 German floods
- 2014 Bosnian floods
- 2014 Västmanland wildfire
- 2015 Nepal earthquake
- August 2020, Beyrouth
- February 2022, Turkey earthquakes, Kahramanmaraş
