= Ambulance bus =

Medical bus used to transport and treat several patients at a time

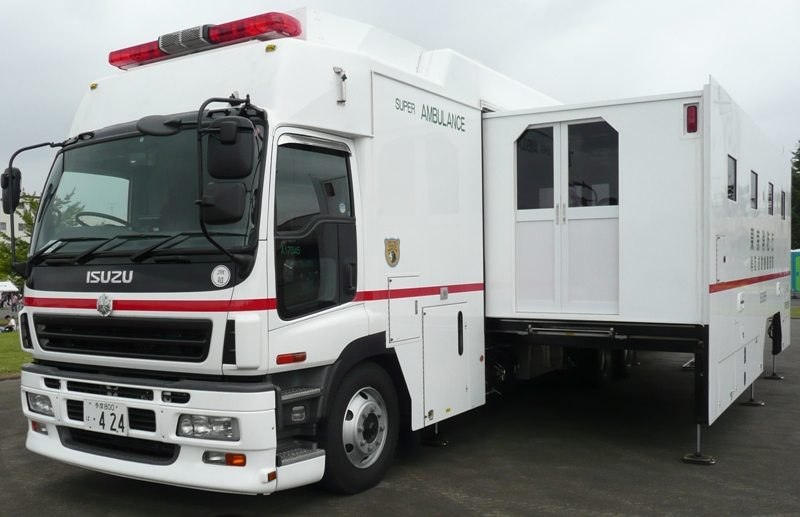
Customized Isuzu "super ambulance" bus used by the Tokyo Fire Department, which can extend into a room-sized treatment facility when stationary

An ambulance bus is a type of ambulance with the capacity to transport and treat a large number of patients. Per its name, it is typically a converted bus, though some may be built from a truck chassis. Ambulance buses are primarily used for medical evacuation of mass casualty incidents and non-emergency medical transport of care-dependent patients, and can also be used for specific assignments such as holding intoxicated patients in high-traffic areas, blood drives, or mass vaccination programs. Some may also be used to carry personnel and equipment.

== Applications ==
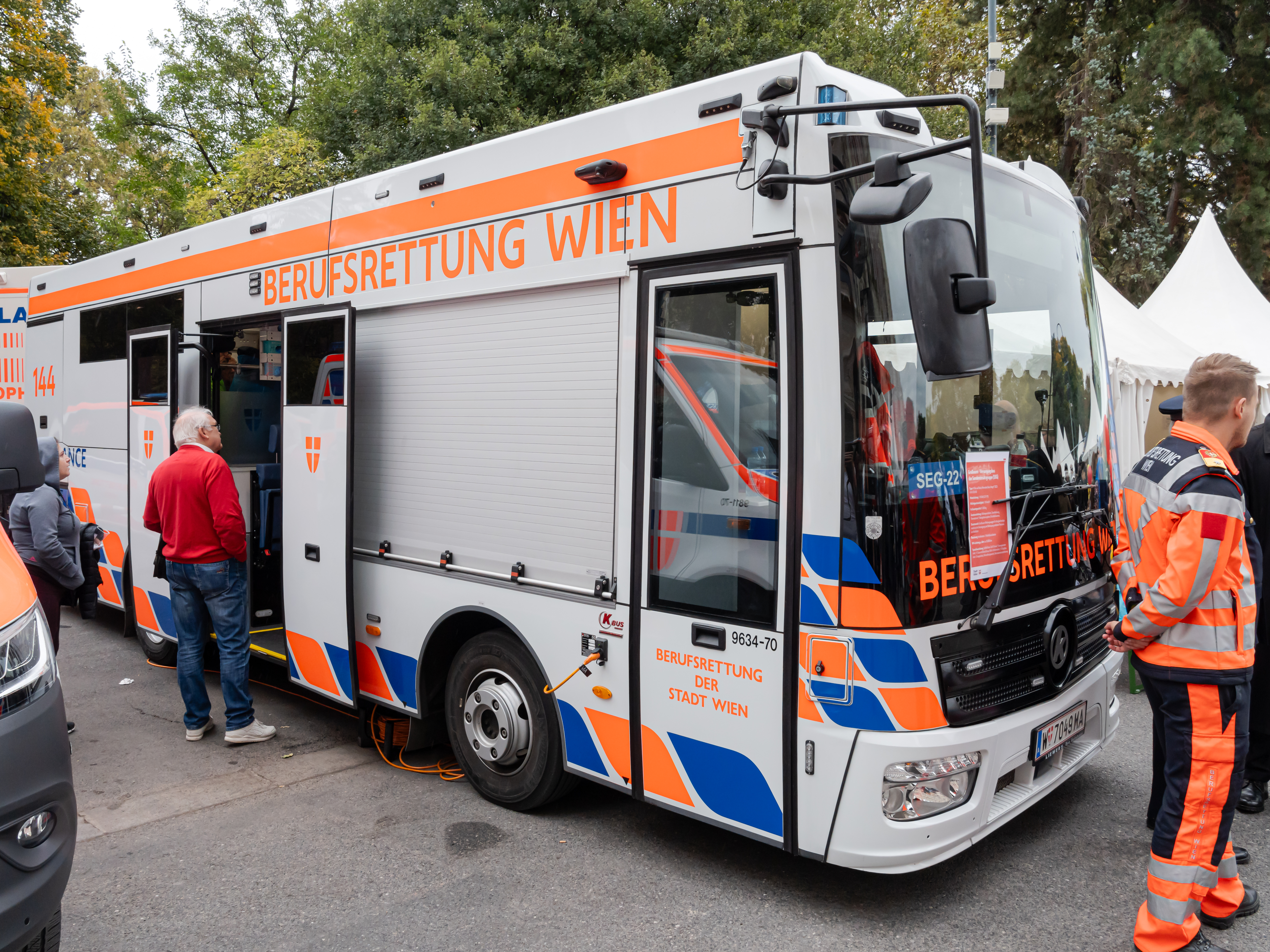
Mercedes-Benz "medical support bus" used by Berufsrettung Wien

=== Mass casualty incidents ===
In the event of a major disaster or evacuation, an ambulance bus can be used to transport multiple patients to the hospital. The vehicle may be equipped with advanced life support systems. Likewise, during an evacuation in advance of a disaster, an ambulance bus can transfer patients in hospitals and nursing homes to care centers out of harm's way.

=== Non-emergency transport ===
An ambulance bus can be used in a transport role to allow stretcher-bound patients to leave the hospital, such as taking excursions or holidays away from the hospital, while still being able to provide the necessary medical care during the journey.

== Conversion of existing vehicles ==
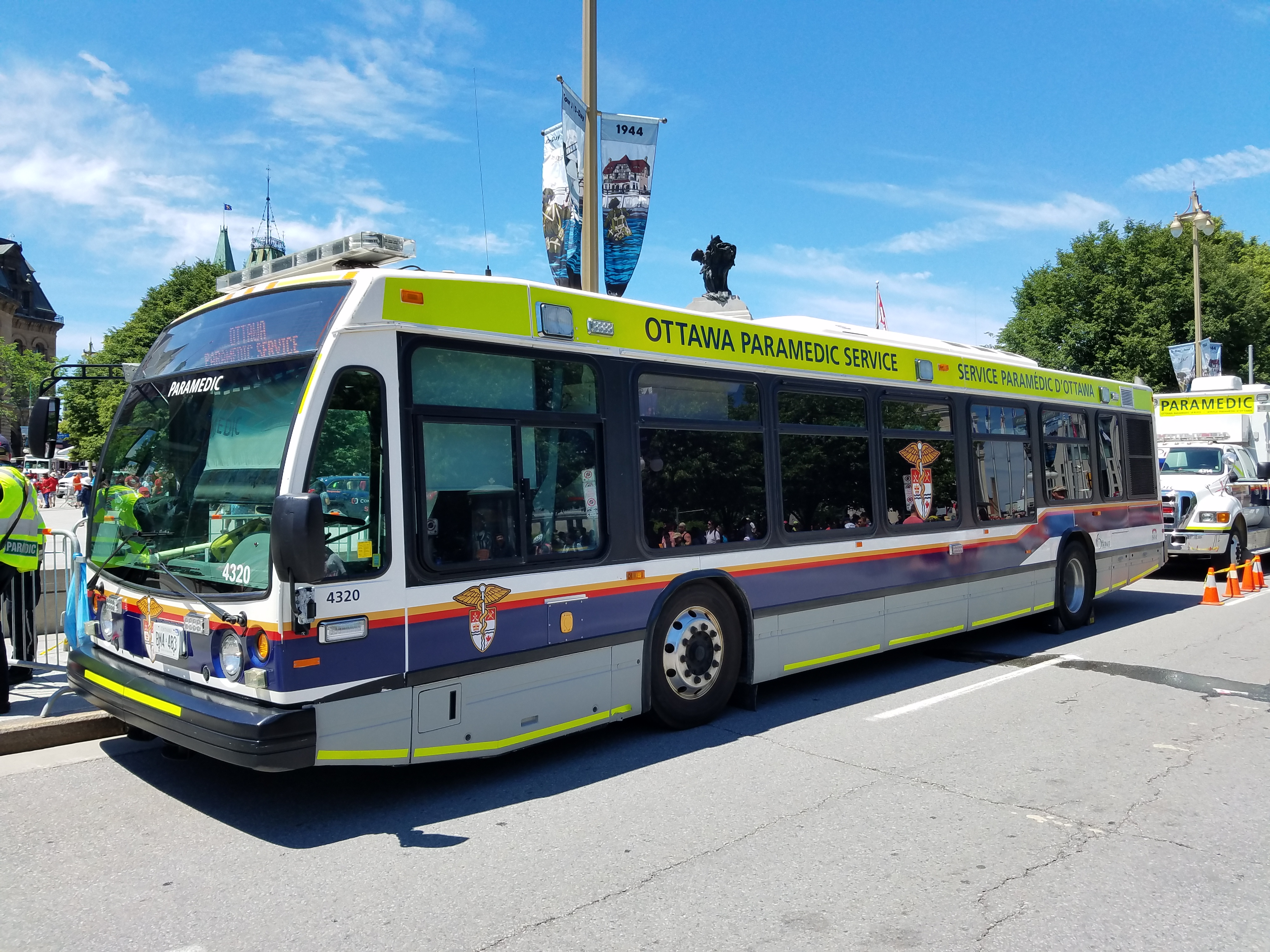
Nova Bus LFS used by the Ottawa Paramedic Service; OC Transpo uses the same bus models

Existing vehicles like buses can be converted into an ambulance bus with the installation of an on-demand ambulance bus kit. On-demand ambulance bus kits are installed inside any available vehicle on an as-needed basis when the need is anticipated in advance, like in the case of natural disasters or planned hospital maintenance. These kits can be installed temporarily or permanently.

== See also ==
- Aid station
- Field hospital
- Hospital ship
- Nontransporting EMS vehicle
- Police bus
