= Urban search and rescue =

Type of technical rescue operation

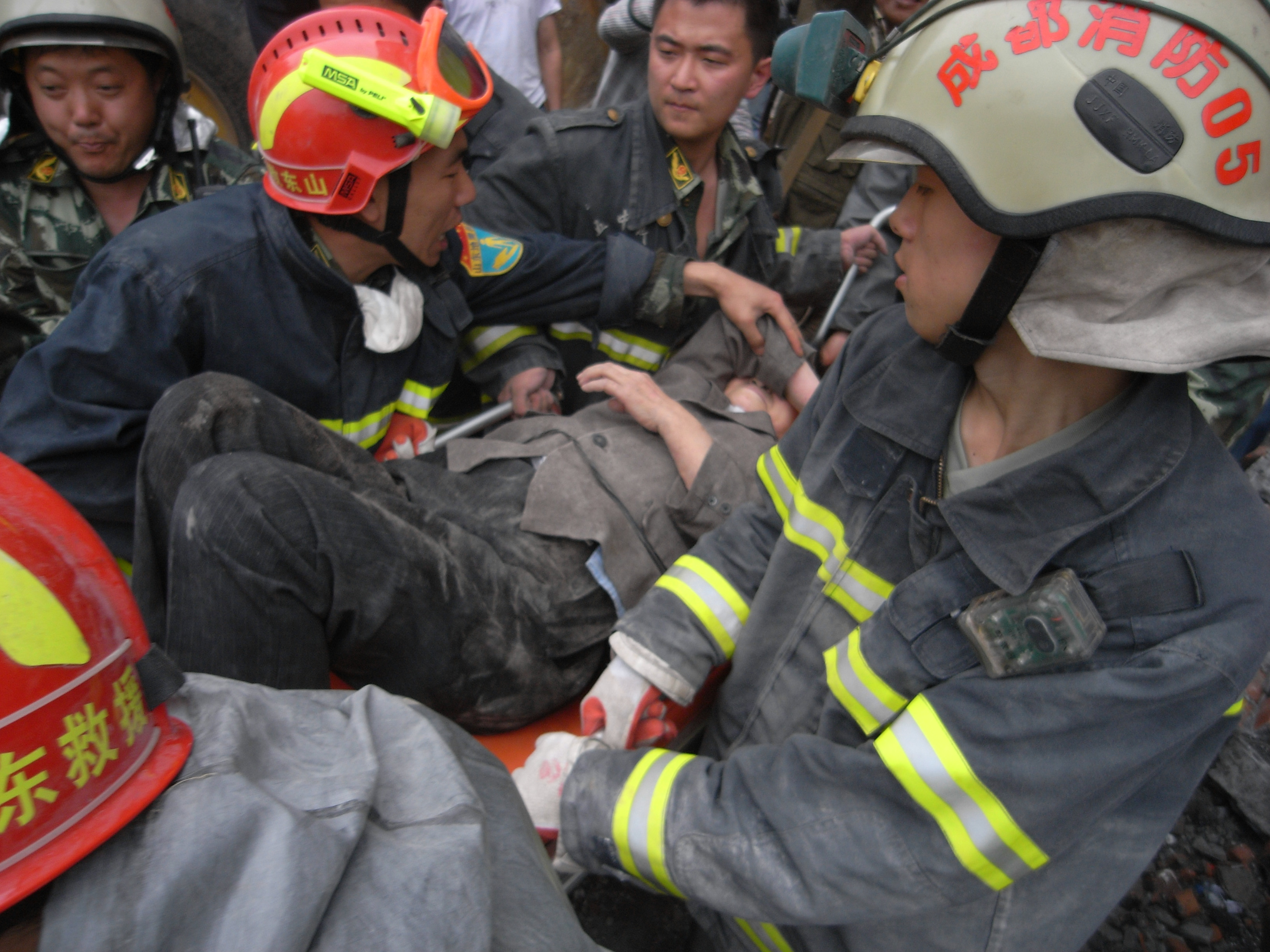
Rescuers with a victim of the 2008 Sichuan earthquake

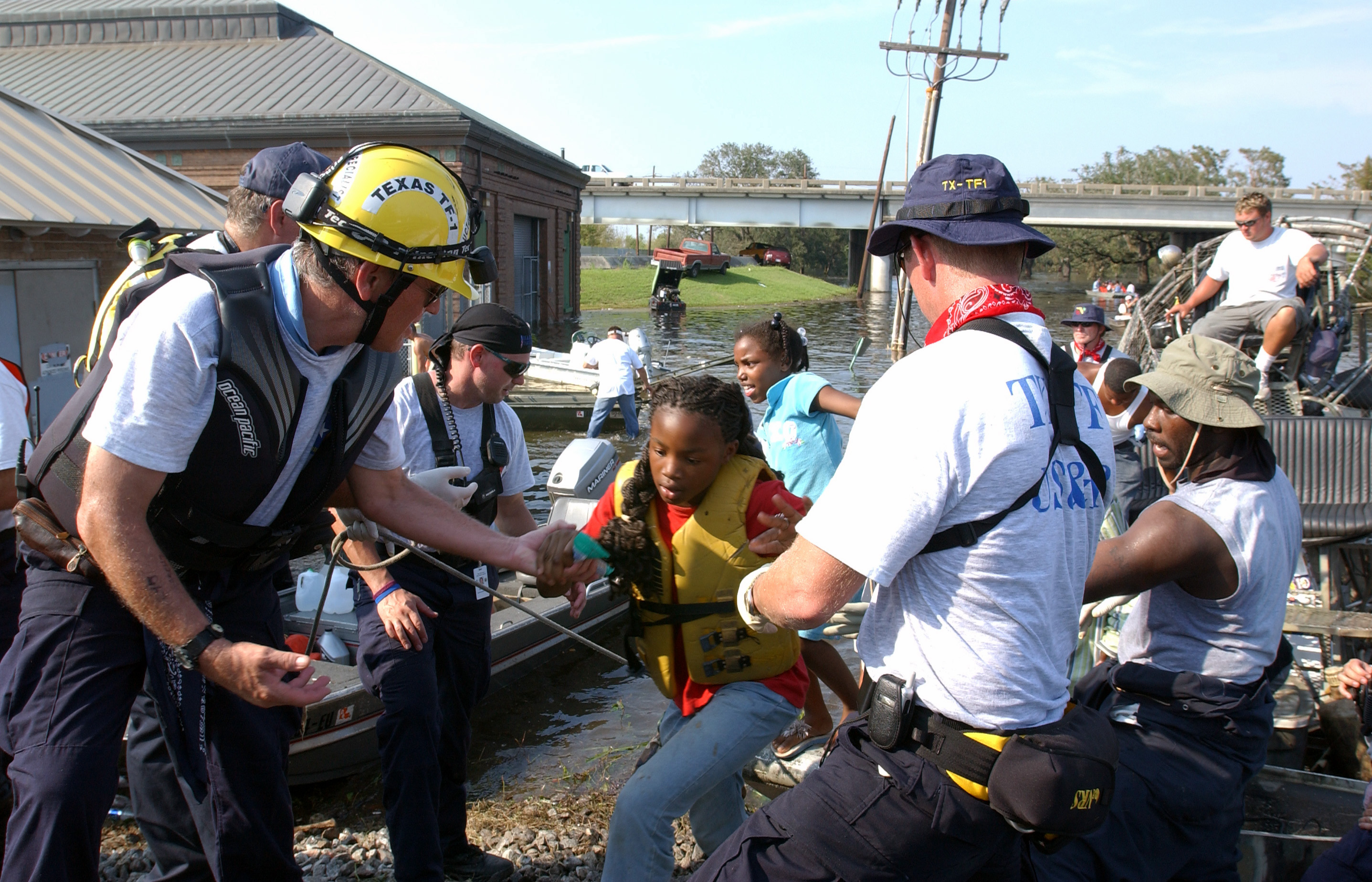
Rescue teams evacuating residents from flooded areas during Hurricane Katrina

Urban search and rescue (abbreviated as USAR or US&R) is a type of technical rescue operation that involves the location, extrication, and initial medical stabilization of victims trapped in an urban area, namely structural collapse due to natural disasters, war, terrorism or accidents, mines and collapsed trenches.

The causes of USAR incidents can be categorised as accidental and deliberate.

Structural collapse incidents can comprise unstable or collapsed structures in an unsafe position. Usually collapse incidents leave voids inside the debris that can result in numerous casualties trapped under large amounts of very heavy and often unstable debris.

USAR services can be faced with complex rescue operations within hazardous environments. Incidents experience shows that people are often found alive many hours and days after rescue operations commence, and the corresponding services should be planned accordingly.

USAR teams in different countries may be organised in a variety of ways, but they are often associated with firefighting services.

The increasingly complex methods and procedures, and the modern ability to bring in teams from far afield has brought a drive for standardization within nations and internationally, most obvious in the role of the United Nations' International Search and Rescue Advisory Group (INSARAG) in large natural disasters.

Urban search-and-rescue is considered a multi-hazard discipline, as it may be needed for a variety of hazards including earthquakes, cyclones, storms and tornadoes, floods, dam failures, technological accidents, terrorist activities, and hazardous materials releases.

== Types ==
USAR task forces are often categorized for standardization. Depending upon the classification, there may be close to 70 positions. To be sure a full team can respond to an emergency, USAR task forces have at the ready more than 140 highly trained members. A task force is often a partnership between local fire departments, law enforcement agencies, federal and local governmental agencies and private companies. In the United States, these can be federally endorsed teams or state teams activated through mutual aid agreements. In England, the responsibility for USAR lies with local authority fire and rescue services. Equipment supplied to them is part of a government initiative known as the New Dimension programme, which provides the training and equipment.

USAR teams bring together, in an integrated response: highly trained personnel from the emergency services along with engineers, medics and search dog pairs, specialised equipment effective communications established methods of command and control logistical support procedures to request international assistance if required under an international search and rescue framework. The training that teams receive is an ongoing procedure combining classes from the local fire and rescue services and government agencies.

== Equipment ==
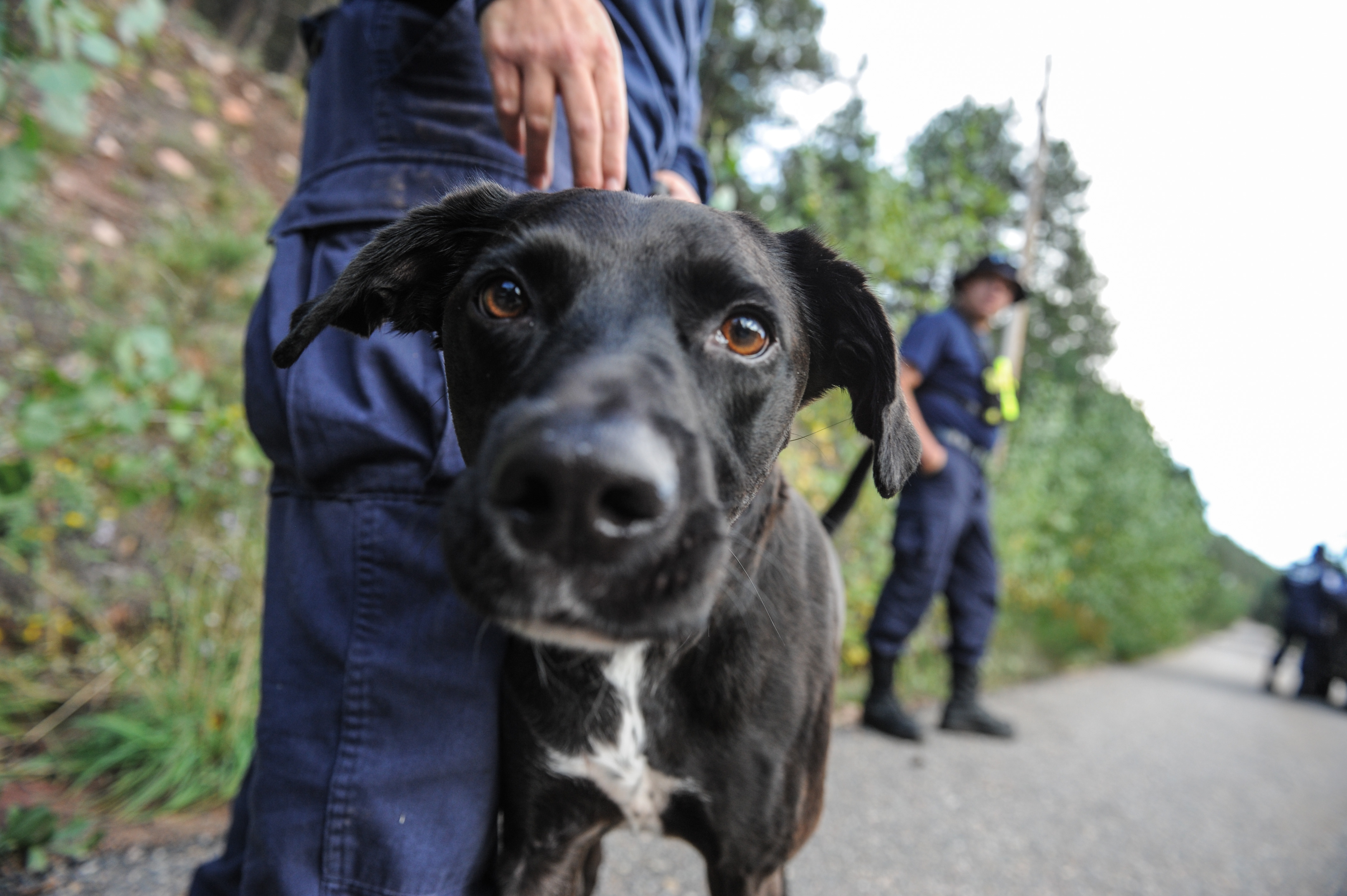
One of the Canine rescuers on assignment after the 2013 Colorado floods. Search and rescue dogs can help their handlers be more effective at finding humans in crises.

USAR task forces are expected to be totally self-sufficient for the first 72 hours of a deployment. The equipment cache used to support a task force can weigh more than 60,000 pounds and is worth more than $1.4 million US. USAR task forces can:

- Conduct physical search-and-rescue operations in collapsed buildings
- Provide emergency medical care to trapped victims
- Utilize search and rescue dogs to find survivors of the collapse
- Assess and control utilities and hazardous materials
- Evaluate and stabilize damaged structures

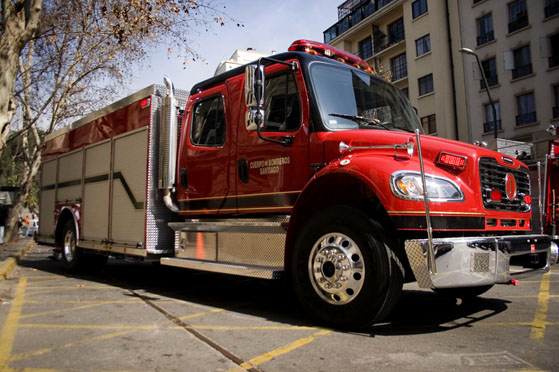
USAR truck, First Company, Santiago de Chile FD

== Techniques ==
In a disaster situation the goal of a search and rescue operation is to rescue the greatest number of people in the shortest amount of time, while minimizing the risk to the rescuers. In the United States, the organization of USAR operations is now standardized under the National Incident Management System, which was in scattered usage before Hurricane Katrina but has since become the standard under [Presidential Directive 5 (HSPD-5]). Katrina proved the difficulty of coordinating multiple disaster response teams from around the country when some used ICS and some used their own local organizational models.

== The three phases of a USAR operation ==
=== Sizeup ===
The first step is to gather facts and make decisions on the course of action. Factors include what types of structures are involved, the extent of damage, the layout of the building(s) involved, what hazards are present (such as downed power lines, natural gas leaks, flooding, animals, hazardous materials, or a structure susceptible to additional collapse during the rescue), and what rescue personnel and equipment are available. Structural damage can be categorized as light, moderate, or heavy. Sizeup is an ongoing process which should continue during all phases of search and rescue so operations can be modified as needed.

=== Search ===
Searchers should use a buddy system or two-in, two-out system and have backup teams available. Techniques for searching for potential victims are based on identifying possible locations of victims, or areas of entrapment. Areas of entrapment inside damaged structures are called voids. There are several types of voids, such as the pancake void (multiple floors of a building have collapsed diagonally onto each other), and the lean-to void (a single wall or floor has collapsed diagonally against another wall). Voids can also include spaces where victims may have entered for self-protection during a disaster - such as under desks or in bathtubs or closets.

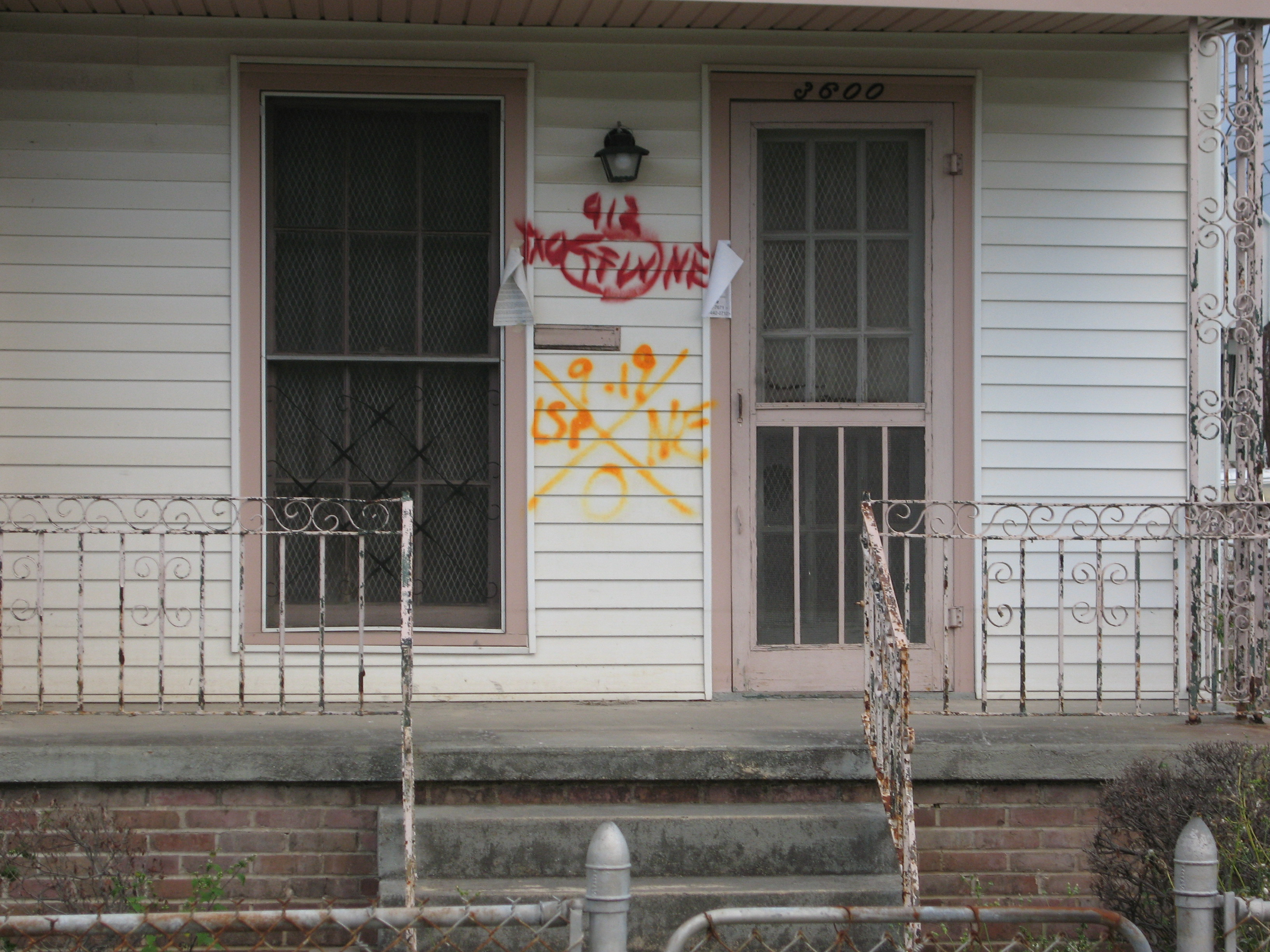
Example of FEMA's marking system in New Orleans's Lower Ninth Ward

Once the potential areas of entrapment have been identified and the potential number of victims sized up, search operations should commence in an orderly manner, beginning with verbally calling out for victims to identify their location if possible, and searching using a systematic search pattern. Possible search patterns include triangulation (using three searchers approaching a potential area of entrapment from three different directions), a right/left search pattern (one team searches the left side and one team the right side of a building), or a bottom-up/top-down search pattern. Searchers should stop frequently to listen for noises or attempted communication from victims; often this can involve all searchers stopping activity at specified periods of time to listen.

In situations where multiple structures are searched such as after a hurricane, the outside of buildings can be marked using the appropriate marking systems to indicate buildings which have already been searched, the results of the search, and to avoid duplication of search efforts.

=== Rescue ===
Trapped victims are removed and medical aid rendered as necessary. The triage system can be used to prioritize medical aid with those needing immediate attention aided first. Removal or stabilization of debris is often necessary to remove victims. This can be accomplished using leveraging to lift the object, or cribbing (constructing a rectangular wooden framework known as a box crib underneath the object to be stabilized). Leveraging and cribbing can be combined. Victims who are ambulatory can then self-extricate, or victims can be removed using lifts, drags, or carries. Removal of victims should be done so as to avoid any further injury: Where any neck or back injury is suspected, the cervical spine should be immobilized first before attempting to move victims, and dragging should be avoided in situations where the presence of debris (e.g., broken glass) would cause further injury by doing so.

== Marking systems ==
Clear standards for marking searched structures are an important part of the process. There are two systems in widespread use, INSARAG and FEMA (Federal Emergency Management Agency).

=== INSARAG ===
Internationally, markings on searched structures usually use the International Search & Rescue Advisory Group marking system:

INSARAG marking system (Discontinued)

- A 1 meter by 1 meter square with G or N (for go or no-go), the team conducting the search, the date and time of the start of the search, and the date and time of the completion of the search written inside.
- The number of live victims removed is written to the left of the square. The number of dead victims found is written to the right of the square. Persons unaccounted for and/or location of other victims is written below the square.
- Additional information on hazards pertaining to the structure is written above the square.
- Any reference to building floor numbers use ground as G, 1 as the first floor above G, B1 as the first floor below G, and so forth. This is contrasted with US floor numbering, that starts with 1 as the ground level.
- When the team has cleared the building to the best of its ability, a circle is drawn around the square.
- When the building has been confirmed clear, a horizontal line is drawn through the entire marking.
- INSARAG marking squares should be written in day-glo orange.

=== FEMA ===
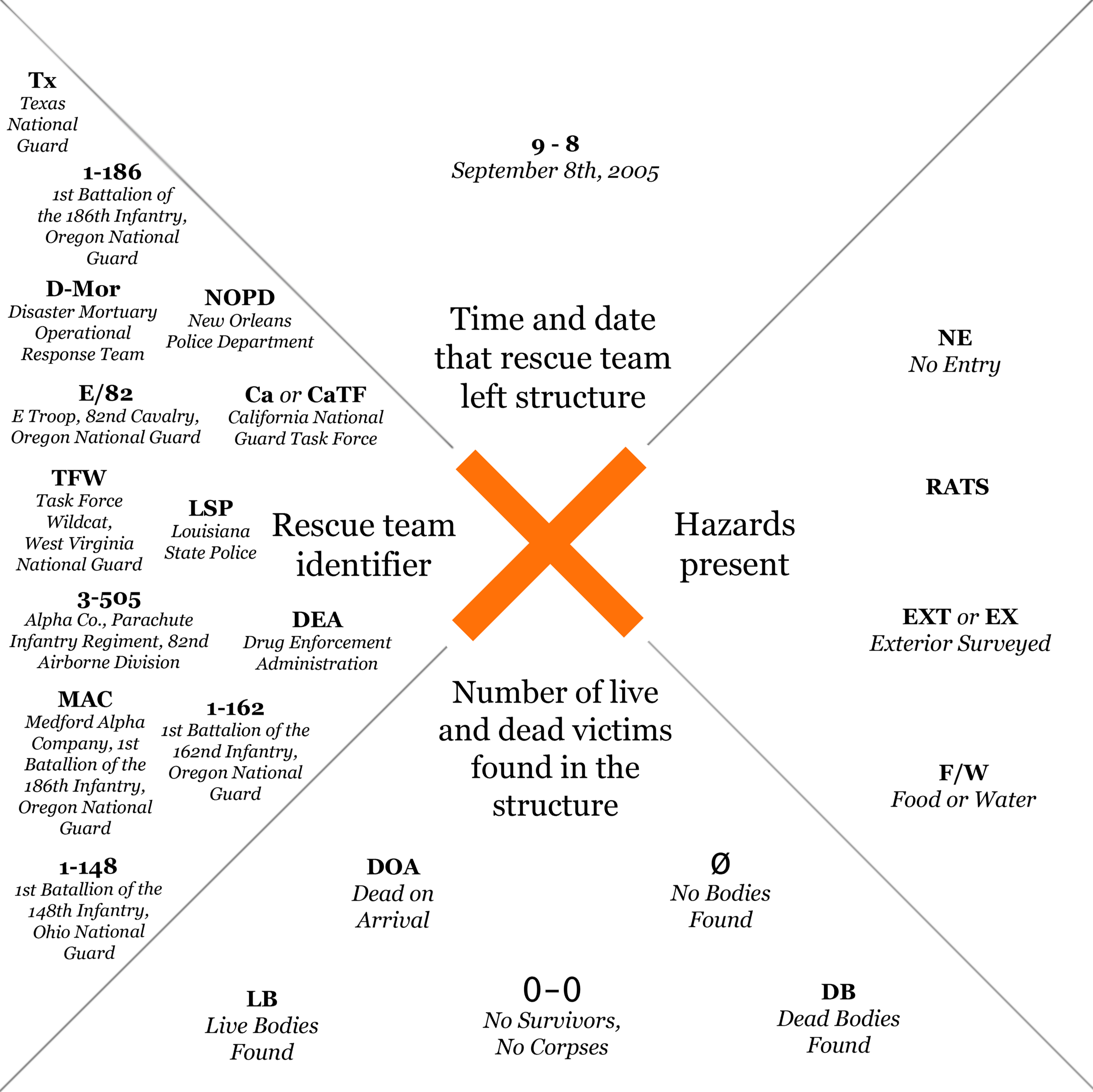
Chart showing some common uses of the FEMA marking system in New Orleans after Hurricane Katrina

In the United States, the Federal Emergency Management Agency (FEMA) uses a different marking system on searched structures, as follows:

- A single diagonal slash indicates that a search of the building is in progress. This is used to indicate searcher locations and to avoid duplication of the search effort.
- An X inside a square means "Dangerous - Do Not Enter!"
- An X with writing around it means "Search Completed", with the time (and the date if appropriate) written above the X, the team conducting the search written to the left side of the X, the results of the search (number of victims removed, number of dead, type of search such as primary or secondary) written below the X, and any additional information noted about the structure to the right of the X.

These x-codes are used in a variety of situations and were prolific (and adopted and modified by other agencies) during post-Katrina operations.

== See also ==
- FEMA Urban Search and Rescue Task Force
- Heavy Urban Search and Rescue
- Search and rescue
- Rescue death
- @fire International Disaster Response Germany
