= Rescue death =

Hypothetical condition

Rescue death (or reflow syndrome) is a hypothesized fatal condition that can occur after blood pools in a part of the body for a prolonged period such as during suspension trauma. There are several proposed mechanisms for this phenomenon. One mechanism suggests that toxins build up in the pooled blood, and problems arise when this toxin-rich, oxygen-poor blood returns to the body when the patient is allowed to lie down. Another mechanism suggests that the sudden increase in preload causes acute heart failure. Although often discussed in lay publications on suspension trauma, several studies systematically reviewing the medical literature have concluded that there is no evidence of this phenomenon.

== Treatment ==
In the past, preventing a patient from lying down following suspension trauma or any other situation where blood had pooled in the legs for an extended period of time was thought to be important; instead, it was recommended that a patient should be placed in a seated position so that the blood could gradually return to the body. However, recent medical guidelines have concluded that there is insufficient evidence to recommend deviating from standard first aid procedures in which an unconscious or hypotensive patient is placed in a supine position. Instead, treatment should consist of removing a patient from suspension and providing basic trauma care, starting with airway management (which could theoretically be impeded by requiring a patient to be kept in a seated position).

== See also ==
- Suspension trauma
- Reperfusion injury, a similar but separate condition
