= Crestline Coach =

Ambulance manufacturer

Crestline Coach Ltd.
- Company type: Private
- Industry: Vehicle Manufacturer, Bus Distributor
- Founded: 1979
- Headquarters: Saskatoon, Saskatchewan, Canada
- Key people: Steve Hoffrogge - President & CEO, Scott Sawatsky - VP of Sales & Marketing, Subrata Das - VP of Operations, Greg Muir - VP of Finance
- Products: Ambulances, Buses, Specialty Vehicles, Medical Equipment, Vehicle Parts
- Revenue: 355,3 millions $ (2025)
- Number of employees: 1303 (2025)
- Website: https://crestlineambulances.com/us/?1, https://crestlinebuses.com/

Crestline Coach Ltd. is a Canadian vehicle manufacturer specializing in ambulances, specialty vehicles, and bus distribution, located in Saskatoon, Saskatchewan, with offices in Alberta, Manitoba, Ontario, Quebec, and California.

== Products and operations ==
Crestline’s product range includes custom ambulances, specialty emergency vehicles, and distribution of commercial buses, including transit, shuttle, and wheelchair‑accessible models.

The company has manufactured vehicles that have been sold into every province in Canada, the Canadian Department of National Defense as well as exported to Belgium, Brazil, Brunei, Chile, China, Colombia, Cuba, Ireland, Italy, Jordan, Korea, Kyrgyzstan, Malta, Mexico, Netherlands, Paraguay, Siberia, St Lucia, Sudan, Switzerland, United States and Vietnam.

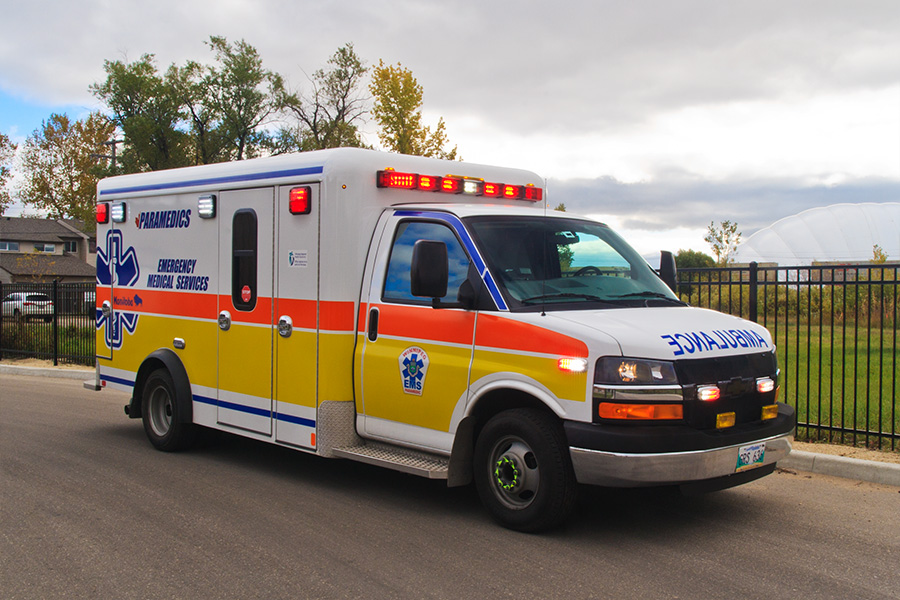
2014 Crestline FleetMax Type III ambulance (Chevy Chassis) used by the Winnipeg Fire Paramedic Service

== See also ==
- Tri-Star Industries – Canadian ambulance manufacturer in Nova Scotia
