= Inversion therapy =

Type of physical therapy

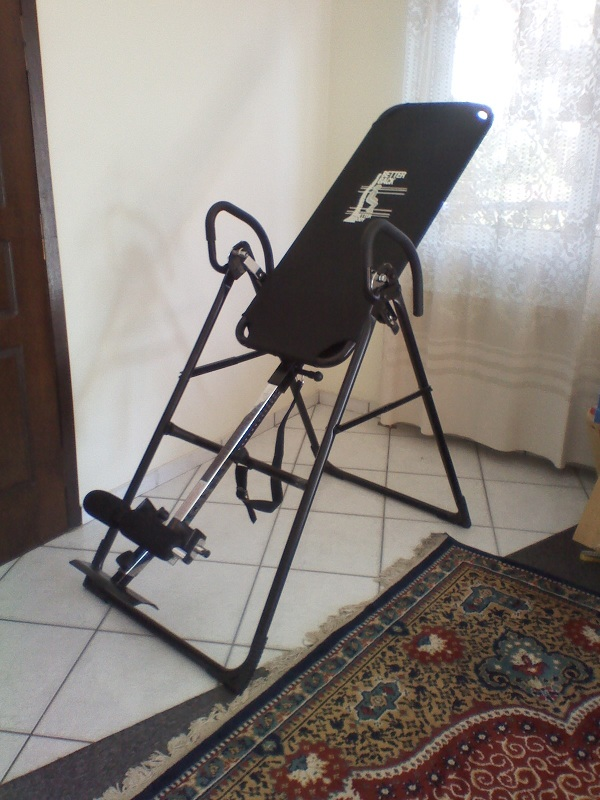
- Foldable inversion table, extended and set up for use
- Specialty: Physical therapy

Inversion therapy is the process of seeking therapeutic benefits from hanging by the legs, ankles, or feet in an inverted angle or entirely upside down. It is a form of spinal traction. Gravity boots are ankle supports designed for inversion therapy. Some people use gravity boots to add an extra challenge to workouts, doing inverted crunches or squats.

== Purpose ==
Inversion therapy uses gravity-assisted traction to reduce compressive forces on the spine. When the body is positioned at an inverted angle, body weight creates a distractive force that slightly and temporarily increases intervertebral spacing. This may reduce pressure on nerve roots, and promote muscle relaxation. These effects are similar in principle to mechanical spinal traction used in clinical rehabilitation settings.

The main benefit, which is usually achieved within a few minutes, is that it feels pleasant while it is happening. Most people do not get any benefit in terms of the speed or quality of recovery. Consequently, if it does not make the person feel better, then it should be discontinued. For low back pain, inversion therapy should be paired with physical therapy exercises that improve strength and flexibility.

== Method ==
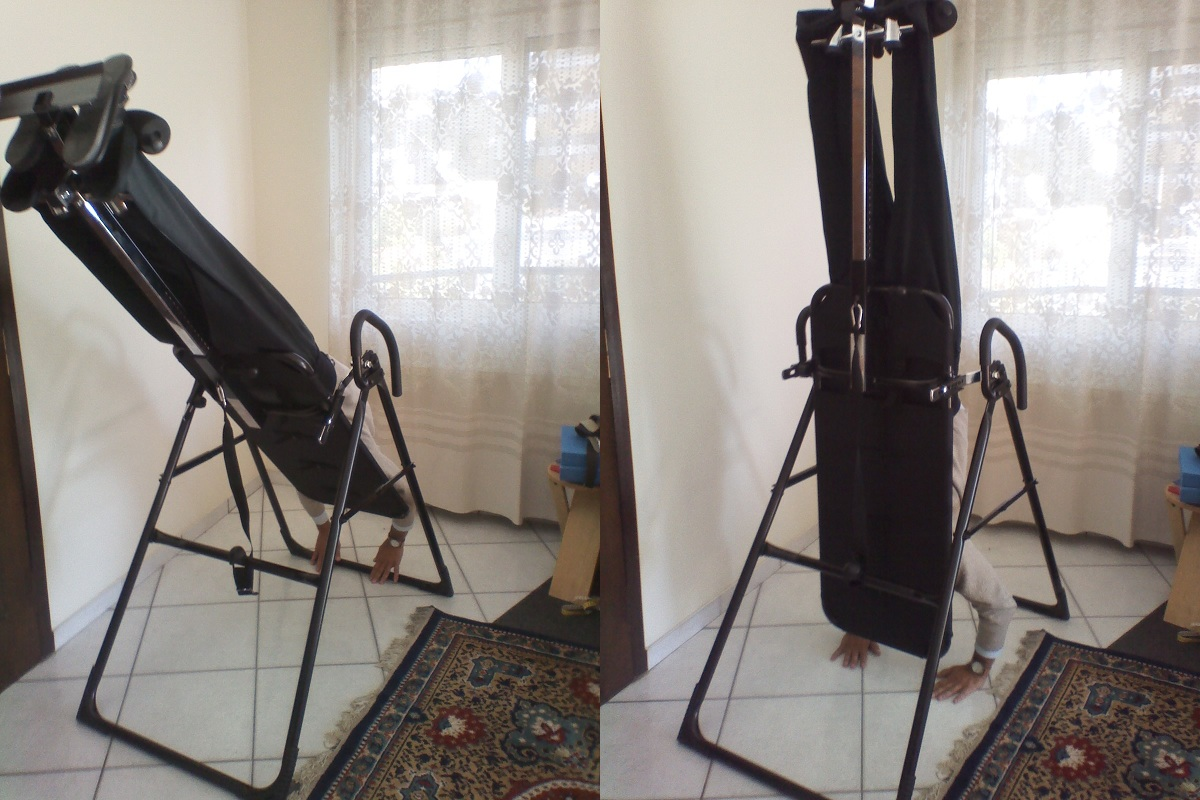
Inversion table in action

There are several devices, each with their own method of operation. Gravity boots, for example, are part of a system that is usually installed in a doorway or on a pull-up bar. The person puts on the boots and pulls their legs up to hook onto the bar. An inversion table may use straps to secure the legs, and then is tilted until the person is upside down.

Inversion therapy has some health risks, and sometimes people, especially when they are new, need assistance to get out of the apparatus.

== Contraindications ==
People who have heart disease, high blood pressure, eye diseases (such as glaucoma), or are pregnant are at higher risk for the dangers related to inversion therapy. The inverted position, leading to an increase in heart rate and output, peripheral resistance, venous return and myocardial oxygen consumption, is not recommended in cardiac individuals.

During an episode of acid reflux, small amounts of stomach acid may escape from the stomach and into the oesophagus. Gravity typically minimizes this upward leakage, but an inversion table and acid reflux can be a painful, nauseating, and potentially dangerous combination.

Inversion therapy should not be performed for long periods of time, with 10 minutes being a recommended maximum. Most people find inversion therapy is uncomfortable on their ankles after a few minutes.

== See also ==
- Suspension trauma – potentially deadly result of hanging upright too long
