= Suspension trauma =

Type of medical trauma

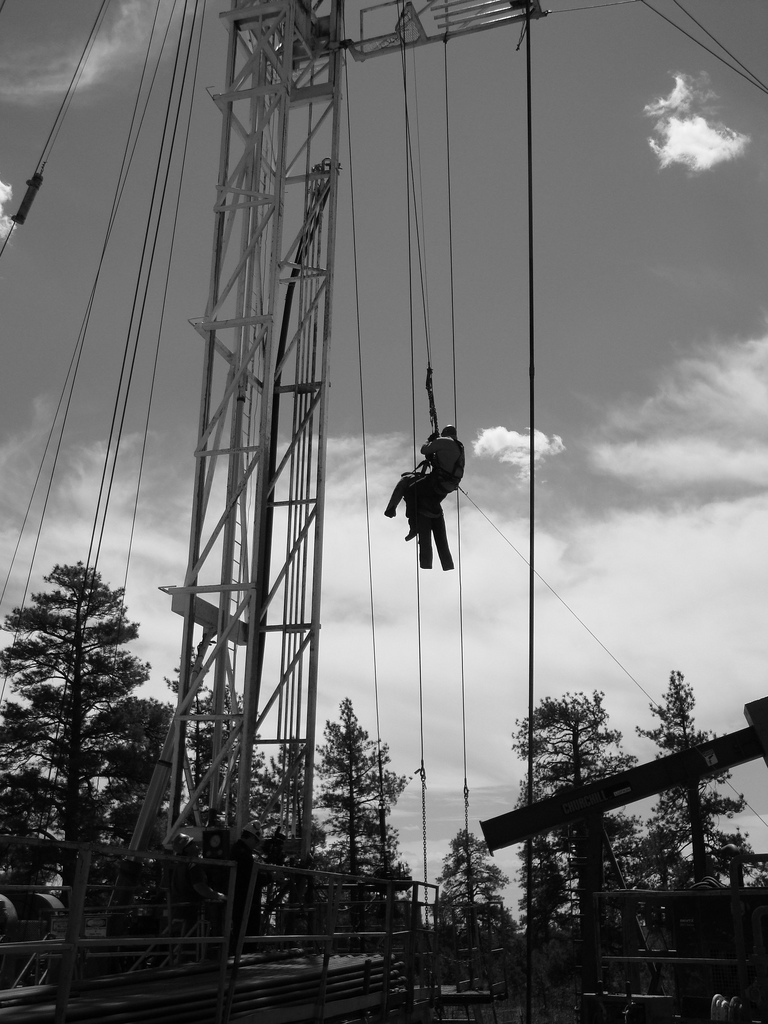
Worker hanging strapped into a safety harness during a fall rescue drill

Suspension trauma, also known as orthostatic shock while suspended, harness hang syndrome (HHS), suspension syndrome, or orthostatic intolerance, is an effect which occurs when the human body is held upright without any movement for a period of time. If the person is strapped into a harness or tied to an upright object they will eventually suffer the central ischaemic response (also known as syncope or fainting). Fainting while remaining vertical increases the risk of death from cerebral hypoxia. Since there is no evidence that these effects are specifically due to trauma, or caused by the harness itself, climbing medicine authorities have argued against the terminology of suspension trauma or harness hang syndrome and instead termed this simply "suspension syndrome".

People at risk of suspension syndrome include people using industrial harnesses (fall arrest systems, abseiling systems, confined space systems), people using harnesses for sporting purposes (caving, climbing, parachuting, etc.), stunt performers, circus performers, and occupations that require the use of harnesses and suspension systems in general.

In the UK the term "suspension trauma" has been replaced by "syncope" or "pre-syncope" as "trauma" suggests that there has been a physical injury that has resulted in the fallen person becoming unconscious. In the circumstances where a person has fallen into suspension on a rope/lanyard and has become unconscious, it is thought that the unconscious state "syncope" is due to a combination of orthostasis or motionless vertical suspension, with "pre-syncope" being the state before the person becomes unconscious where the fallen person may experience symptoms such as light-headedness; nausea; sensations of flushing; tingling or numbness of the arms or legs; anxiety; visual disturbance; or faintness. HSE Research Report RR708 2009 1 Introduction page 5 paragraphs 1 and 3 refers.

== Cause ==
The most common cause is accidents in which the person remains motionless suspended in a harness for longer periods of time. Motionlessness may have several causes including fatigue, hypoglycemia, hypothermia or traumatic brain injury.

== Symptoms ==
Onset of symptoms may be after just a few minutes, but usually occurs after at least 20 minutes of free hanging. Typical symptoms are pallor, sweating, shortness of breath, blurred vision, dizziness, nausea, hypotension and numbness of the legs. Eventually it leads to fainting, which may result in death due to oxygen deprivation of the brain.

== Treatment ==
If someone is stranded in a harness, but is not unconscious or injured, and has something to kick against or stand on (such as a rock ledge or caving leg-loops) it is helpful for them to use their leg muscles by pushing against it every so often, to keep the blood pumping back to the torso. If the person is stranded in mid-air or is exhausted, then keeping the legs moving can be both beneficial and rather dangerous. On the one hand, exercising the leg muscles will keep the blood returning to the torso, but on the other hand, as the movements become weaker the leg muscles will continue to demand blood yet they will become much less effective at returning it to the body, and the moment the victim ceases moving their legs, the blood will immediately start to pool. "Pedaling an imaginary bicycle" should only be used as a last-ditch effort to prolong consciousness, because as soon as the "pedaling" stops, fainting will shortly follow. If it is impossible to rescue someone immediately, then it is necessary to raise their legs to a sitting position, which can be done with a loop of rigging tape behind the knees or specialized equipment from a rescue kit.

When workers are suspended in their safety harnesses for long periods, they may suffer from blood pooling in the lower body. This can lead to suspension trauma, although recent research shows that this may not always be the case. Once a worker is back on the ground after a fall has been arrested on a fall protection system, a worker should be placed in the “W” position. The “W” position is where a worker sits upright on the ground with their back/chest straight and their legs bent so that their knees are in line with the bottom of their chin. For added stability, make sure that the worker’s feet stay flat on the ground. In this position, a KED board can still be used if there are any potential spinal injuries and a worker needs stabilization before transport.

Previously, it was thought that once the worker is in this position, they will need to stay in that position for at least 30 minutes. Try to leave the worker in this position until their symptoms begin to subside. The time in the “W” position will allow the pooled blood from the legs to be slowly re-introduced back into the body. By slowing the rate at which the pooled blood reaches different organs, you are giving the body more of an opportunity to filter the pooled blood and maintain internal homeostasis.

== Prevention ==
Prevention of suspension trauma is preferable to dealing with its consequences. Specific recommendations for individuals doing technical ropework are to avoid exhausting themselves so much that they end up without the energy to keep moving, and making sure everyone in a group is trained in single rope rescue techniques, especially the "single rope pickoff", a rather difficult technical maneuver that must be practiced frequently for smooth performance.

== Updated Literature ==
The most recent comprehensive study of this phenomenon was performed in 2016 by James Marc Beverly. The study, titled "Harness Suspension Stress Physiological and Safety Assessment", found no evidence to support medical intervention beyond ACLS for individuals who are adversely effected by hanging in a harness. The findings in this study should be closely examined by others with interest in the topic as it is the most robust set of data collected on subjects hung in harnesses to include blood labs, calf measurements, EKG, ultrasonography, and vital signs in a controlled environment.

== See also ==
- Reflow syndrome, which occurs when toxins that accumulated in pooled blood suddenly return to the body when the person lies down following suspension trauma
- Compartment syndrome, a dangerous condition that sometimes occurs with suspension trauma
