= Nontransporting EMS vehicle =

Emergency vehicle equipped for providing care, but not transporting patients

A nontransporting EMS vehicle (Note: Also known as squad cars, fly cars, quick response vehicles, and chase cars.) is a vehicle that responds to and provides emergency medical services (EMS) without the ability to transport patients.

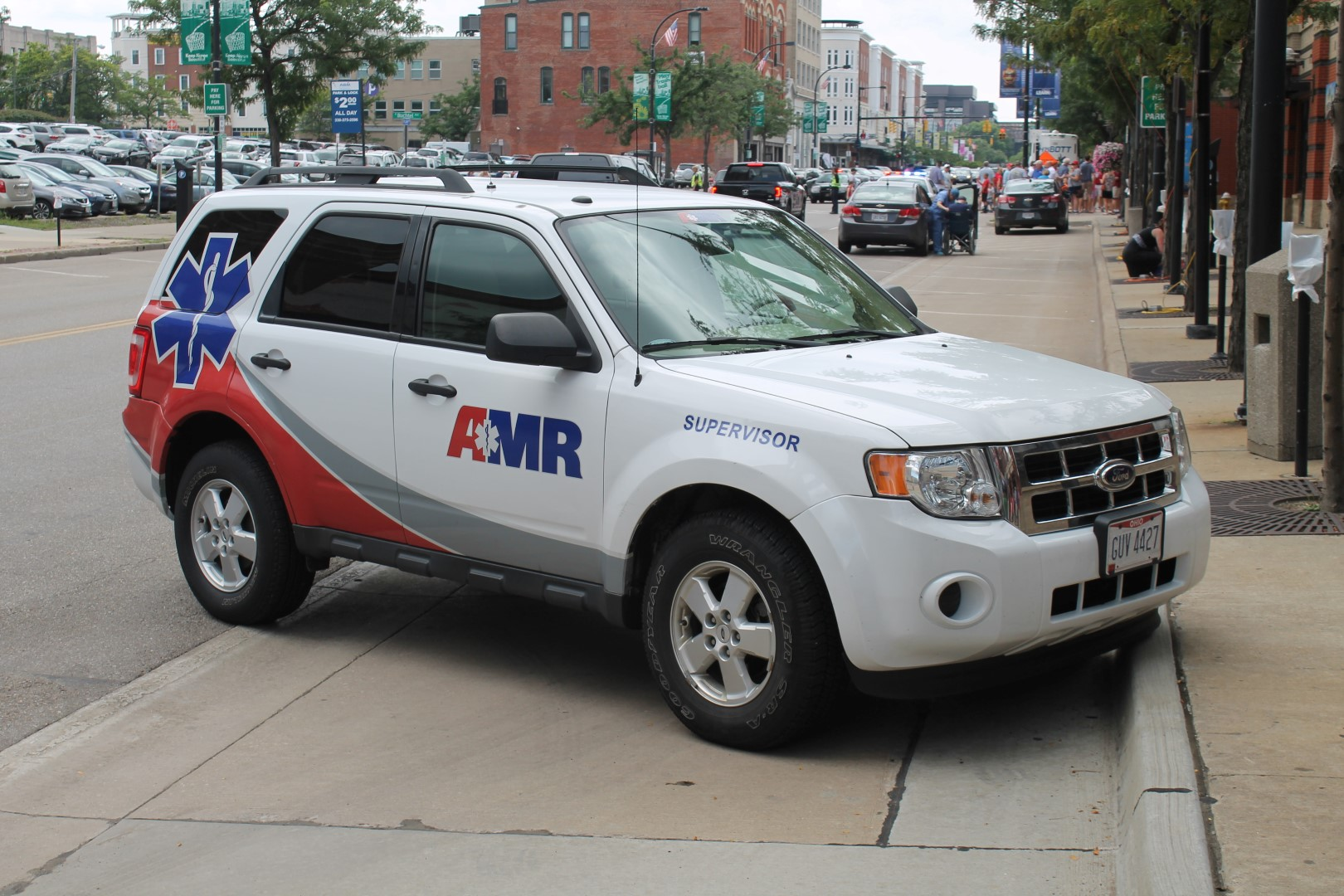
An American Medical Response Ford Escape chase car in the US

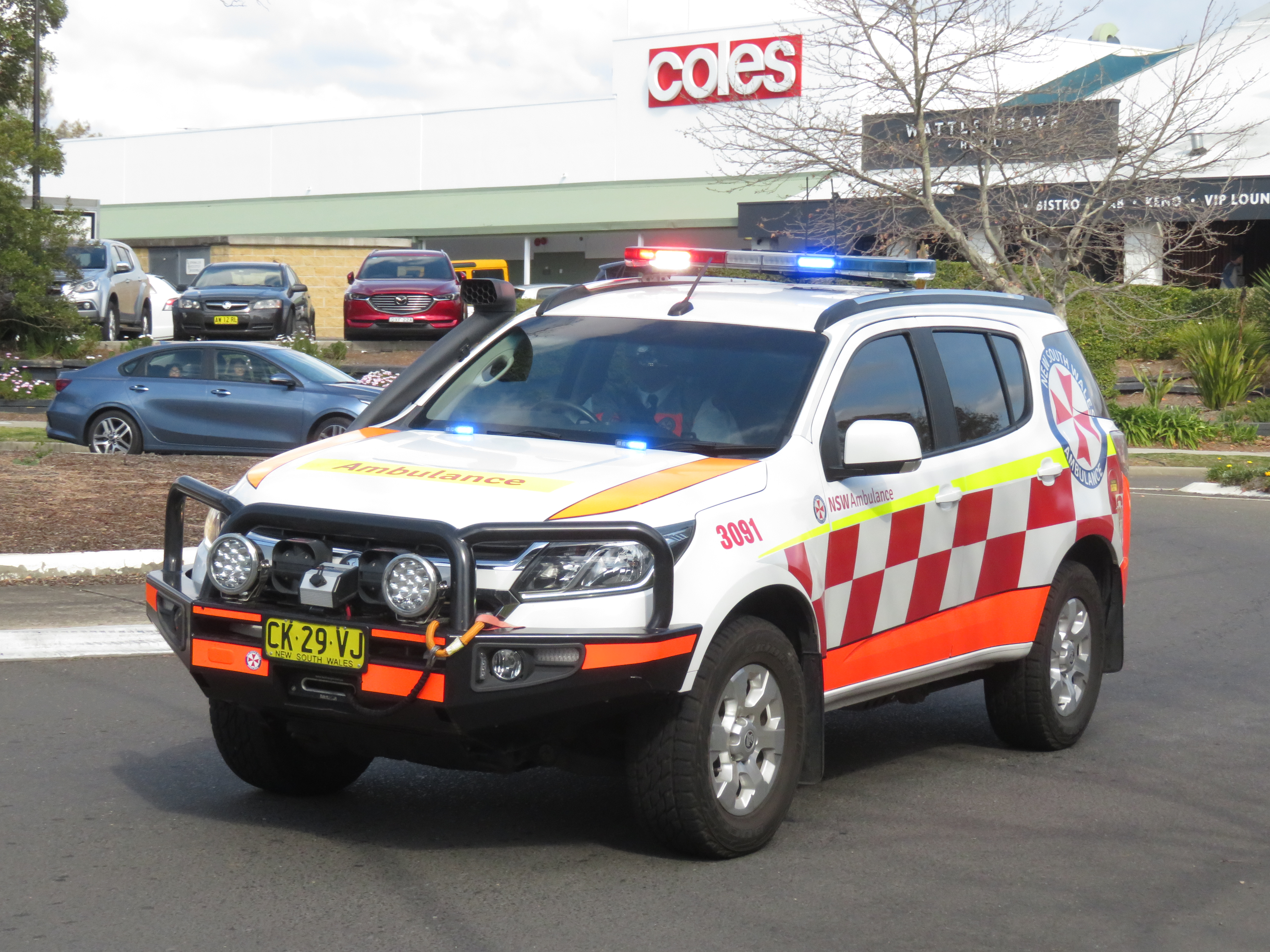
A Holden TrailBlazer emergency response car in Australia

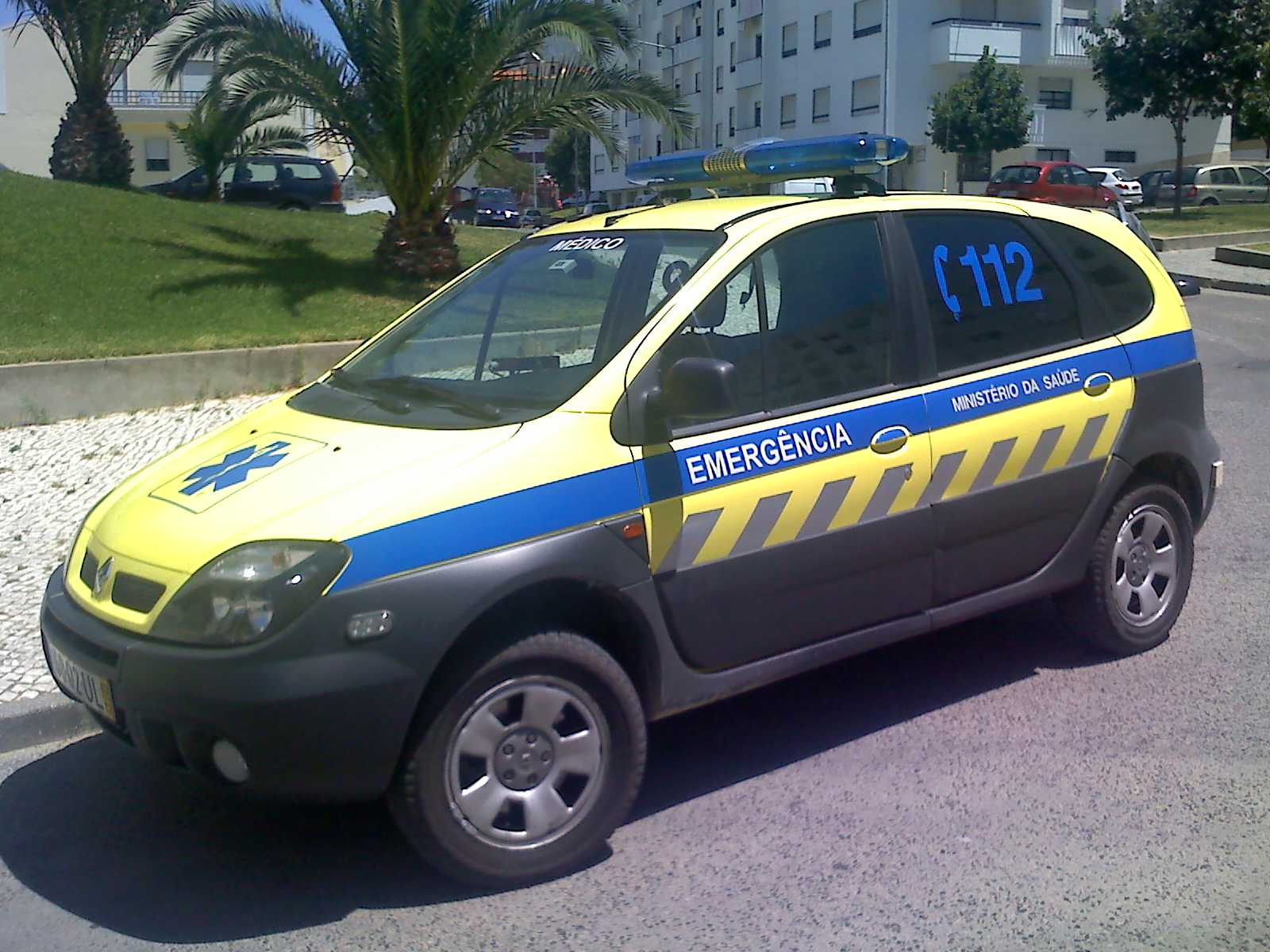
Emergency medical vehicle, built in a Renault Scenic, in Santarém, Portugal

== Examples ==
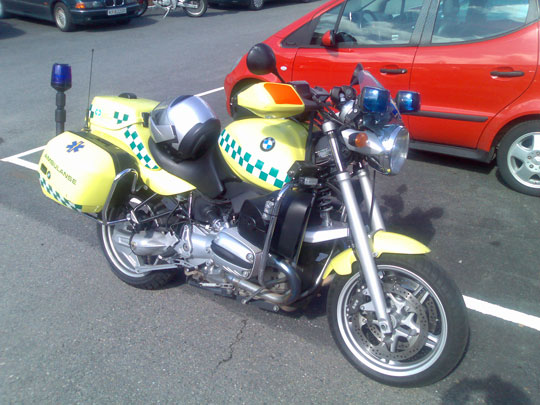
Prehospital motorcycle from Oslo, Norway

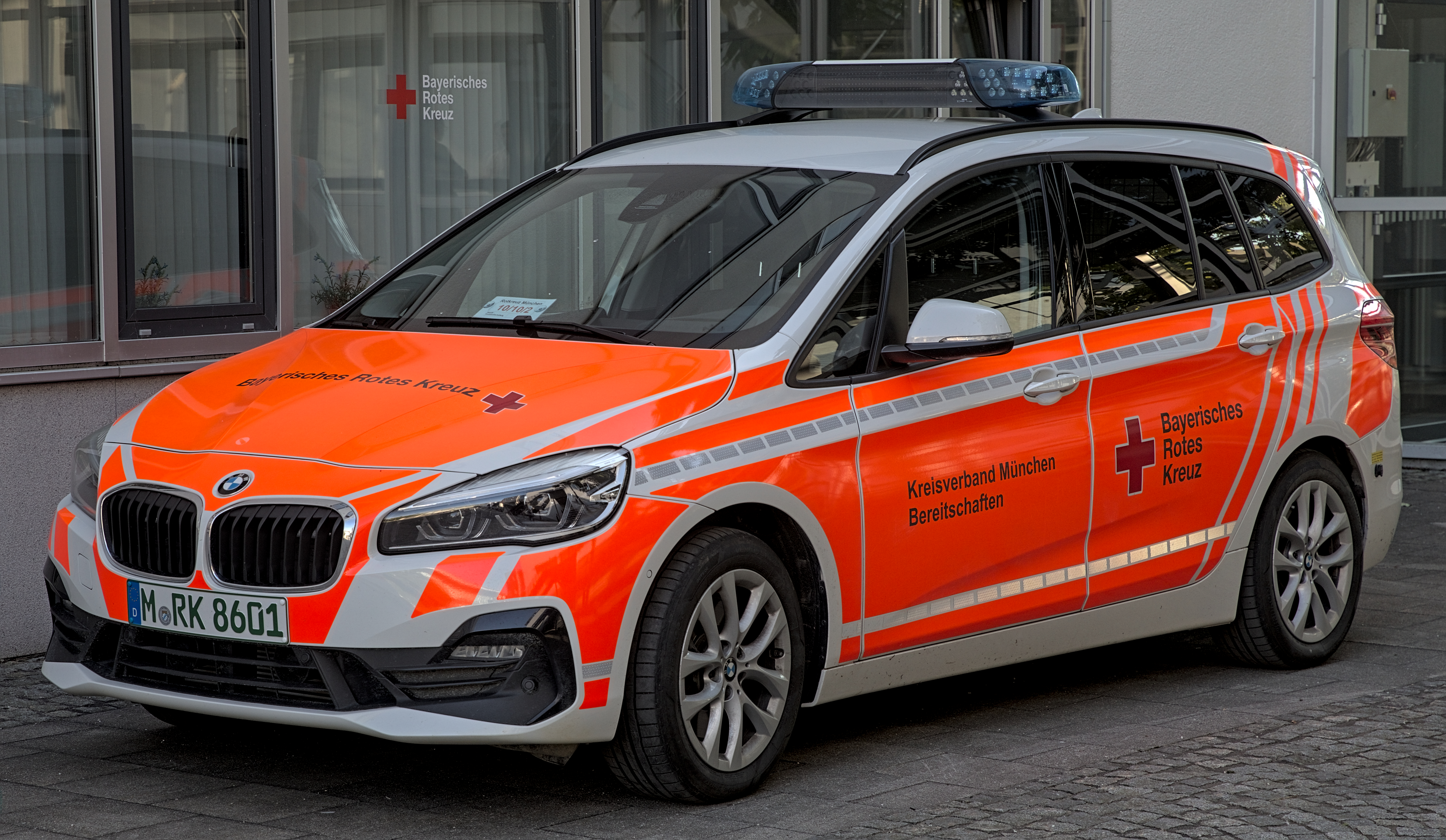
German emergency physician car (Notarzteinsatzfahrzeug).

In the Swedish medical system, a non-transporting vehicle (akutbil) can be equipped with a nurse specialized in anesthesia who is specialized in pain management, paired together with a paramedic. These vehicles can be staffed around the clock or during the busiest hours of the day and week in order to augment the capacity of the prehospital care provider and can respond both independently and in conjunction with one or more ambulances, air ambulance(s) and other emergency services. As a result of new (circa 2013) legislation requiring all ambulances to be equipped with at least one trained nurse, non-transporting vehicles have become less common.

In the United States, several fire departments and private ambulance services have fly-car programs. The Fire Department of the City of New York (FDNY) added EMS capabilities to many of their fire engines, effectively adding dozens of EMS units to their fleet without having to purchase or staff additional ambulances. In 2016, the FDNY launched a formal EMS fly-car program to reduce EMS response times; this practice was suspended in March 2020 due to the COVID-19 pandemic. The program received criticism from the FDNY EMS union, which argued that the fly-car program siphoned personnel and resources from the regular EMS ambulance service. The New York City branch of Hatzalah, a Jewish volunteer EMS program, operates a two-tiered dispatch model where EMTs and paramedics respond to a call in their fully equipped private vehicles acting as fly-cars, while an ambulance is brought for transport if necessary.

== See also ==
- Ambulance
- Motorcycle ambulance
- Air medical services
