= Markham Airport =

Toronto/Markham Airport
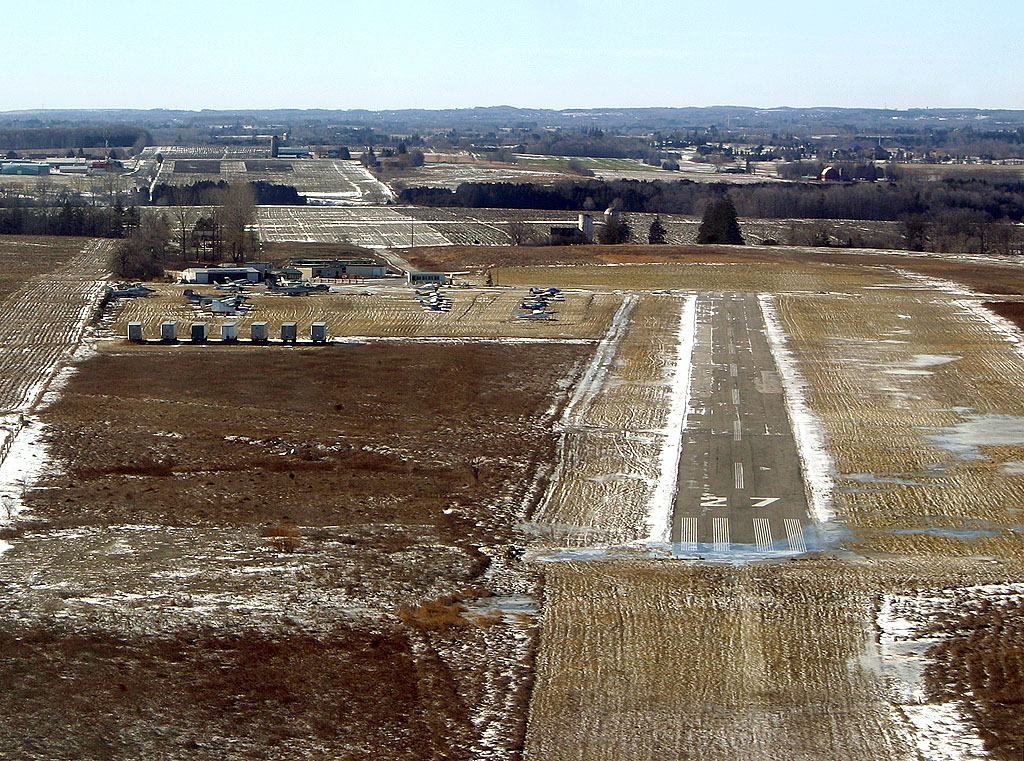
- Final approach into Markham
- IATA: none; ICAO: none; TC LID: CNU8

Summary
- Airport type: Private
- Operator: Markham Airport Inc.
- Serves: Markham and Stouffville
- Location: Markham, Ontario
- Opened: 1965
- Time zone: EST (UTC−05:00)
  - Summer (DST): EDT (UTC−04:00)
- Elevation AMSL: 807 ft (246 m)
- Coordinates: 43°56′09″N 079°15′44″W

Map
- Location in Ontario CNU8 (Canada)

Runways
Direction	Length		Surface
Direction	ft	m	Surface
09/27	2,013	614	Asphalt
- Source: Canada Flight Supplement

Markham Airport or Toronto/Markham Airport (TC LID: CNU8) is a private aerodrome operating 2.6 nautical miles (4.8 km; 3.0 mi) north of Markham, Ontario, Canada near Toronto.

The airport was founded in 1965 by two former Polish air force pilots and is operated by Markham Airport Inc. The airport is not part of the Greater Toronto Airports Authority (GTAA). It consists of a single 2,013 ft (614 m) runway for small and private aircraft only (with night flying capabilities). The Royal Canadian Air Cadets Gliding Program uses the north side of the runway 09/27 for glider operations in the spring and fall, and use a northern traffic pattern.

== Airport data ==
- Coordinates: N43 56 09 W79 15 44 UTC−5(4)
- Runway 09/27: 2,013 ft × 50 ft (614 m × 15 m) - asphalt
- Elevation: 807’ VTA A5000 F-21
- Unicom Frequency: 122.80
- Runway orientation: 09/27
- Lighting: 09-(TE ME), 27-(TE ME) PNR Opr (Prior Notice Required Operator)
- ATF: UNICOM LTD HRS o/t TFC 122.8 5 NM (9.3 km; 5.8 mi) 3500 ASL excluding portion within CYKZ CZ capped at 2000 ASL
- Radio: 122.8 MHz for ATF radio communications
- Tower: none - ATC operated from Buttonville Municipal Airport until 2019
- Buildings: Aerodrome, airport office (house in converted home), small hangar, assortment of pre-fabricated buildings and portables
- Address: 10953 Highway 48, Markham, ON L3P 3J7

There are plans for more hangars, museum building, helipad and expanded 6,000 ft (1,829 m) runway, but it would require approval as the runway would require additional land (by acquiring neighbouring farmland) and is also restricted from expansion due by Pickering Airport plans.

== Tenants ==
- Central Region Spring Familiarization Flying Program - Royal Canadian Air Cadets
- Greater Toronto Gliding Centre (Royal Canadian Air Cadets Schweizer SGS 2-33A)

== Facilities ==
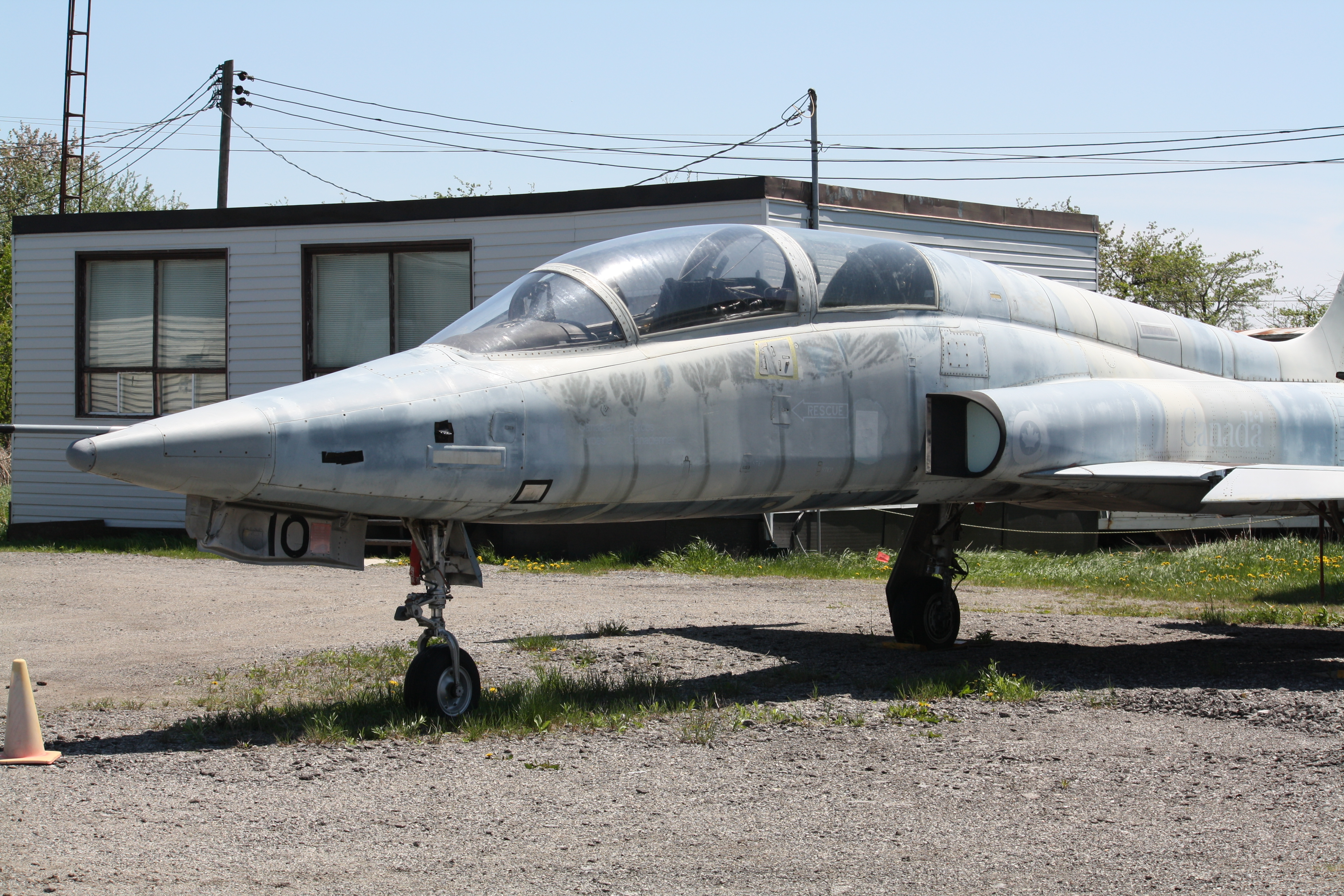
Canadair CF-5 museum aircraft at Markham Airport

Located at the entrance of the airfield is a classrooms used by tenant flight school Canadian Flyer International. There is one small hangar at the airport with most aircraft parked on the grass on the south side of the runway. A number of storage sheds, portables and trailers are found at the airport.

The airport tarmac is also home to a few aircraft and other military equipment from the Canadian Air, Land and Sea Museum.

- CT-128 Expeditor transport
- CT-133 Silver Star
- CF-5 Freedom Fighter
- CF-104 Starfighter (Various Airforces, FX99 return to Belgium in 2021)
- Canadair CL-13 Sabre
- Schweizer SGS 2-33A Royal Canadian Air Cadets
- Noorduyn Norseman - shell only
- Bedford TK 4x4 - appears to have disappeared

== Ground transportation ==
There are GO Transit flag stops of either side of Highway 48 at the entrance of the airport served by GO bus Route 71. GO Transit Stouffville trains pass to the east of the airport.

Most users of Markham Airport drive or can take a taxi. Highway 48 and Elgin Mills Road are the closest major roads serving the airport. There is limited parking at the airport on the south side of the driveway next to the airport buildings and end of the driveway.

== Support ==
The airport has an office staffed by 5 employees.

The airport has no ARFF services and relies on local fire services. Markham Fire and Emergency Services Stations 9-7 and 9-8 are the nearest within Markham, although Whitchurch-Stouffville Fire Department Station 5-1 is closer to the airport. Medical services are provided by York Region EMS Station 23 in Markham or Station 21 in Stouffville.

The only aviation fuel available at Markham Airport is 100LL for light aircraft.

== Future ==
The airport's future is tied to the development of the Pickering Airport and restrictions under the Aeronautics Act.

== See also ==
- List of airports in the Greater Toronto Area
