= VFRS =

VFRS may refer to:

- Vaughan Fire and Rescue Services in Vaughan, Ontario
- Vancouver Fire and Rescue Services in Vancouver, British Columbia
- Vernon Fire Rescue Services in Vernon, British Columbia
- Volunteer Fire and Rescue Service as a general term
