= Fire services in York Region =

Fire services in the York Region of Canada are provided for and by each municipality. There are 35 fire stations across the region. Most services consist of full-time members, but some services have volunteer firefighters.

The departments in south York Region deal mostly with residential and commercial incidents. The northern departments deal with rural, residential and agricultural fire needs.

== History ==
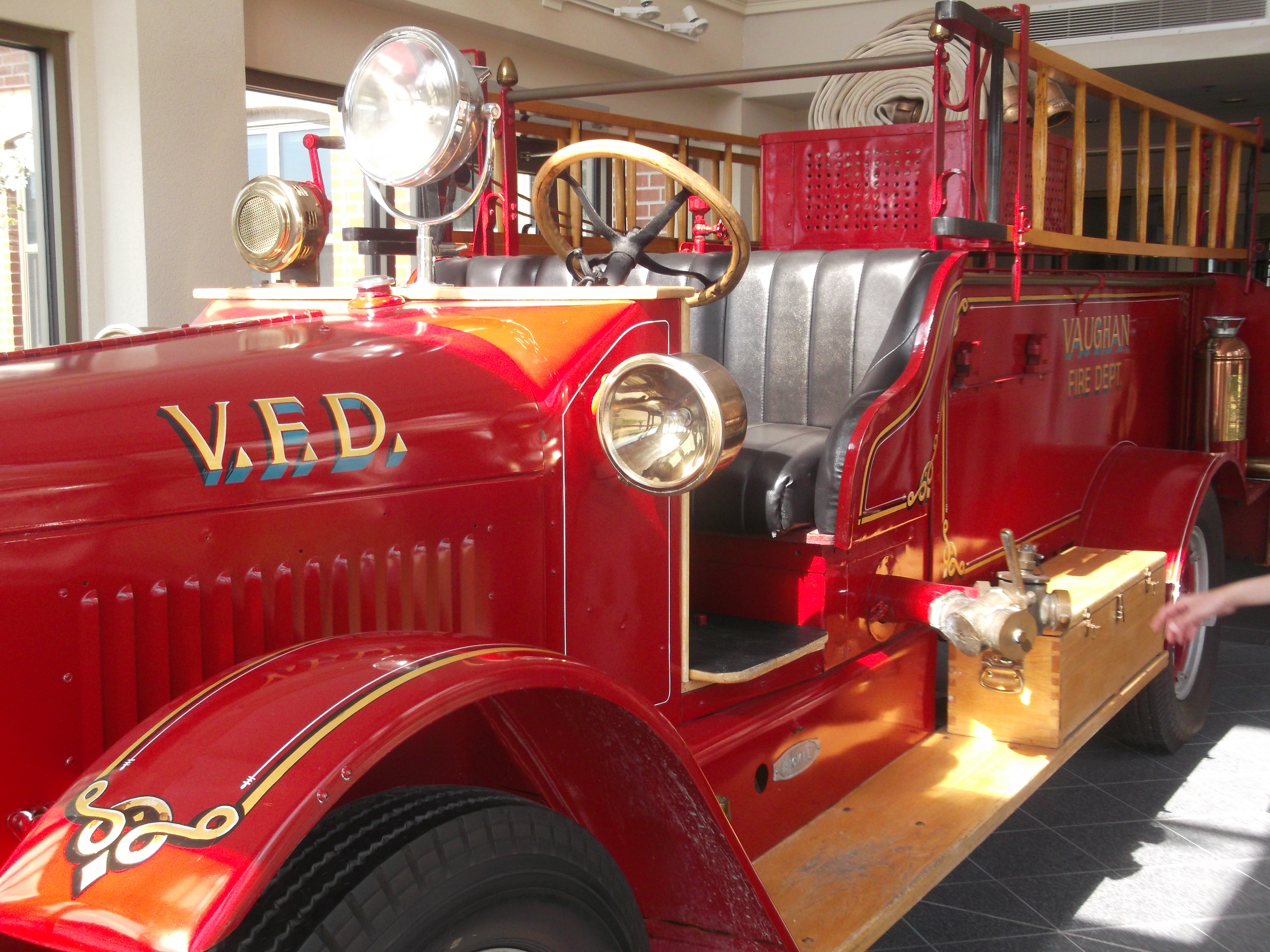
One of Vaughan Fire's first trucks

Fire departments in York Region date back to the 19th century, and all were volunteer units. Later in the 20th century full-time fire departments were created. Some departments in the region still retain volunteer units. East Gwillimbury Fire was the last all-volunteer service in the region until 2008, when the first crew of career firefighters was hired. East Gwillimbury and Georgina still have some volunteer stations, but the Township of King is the only department which remains as an all-volunteer department, with a staff of 105 volunteers servicing King City, Nobelton and Schomberg.

Small local departments slowly merged to form large departments in the 1960s and 1970s. In 2001, York Region was planning to merge all fire services in the region into one large unit. Resistance from firefighters and others prevented the plan from being implemented. This was attempted again in 2013 also with no outcome.

The use of "Fire Department" gave way to "Fire and Emergency" as the firefighters' roles expanded in the 1990s.

== Command ==
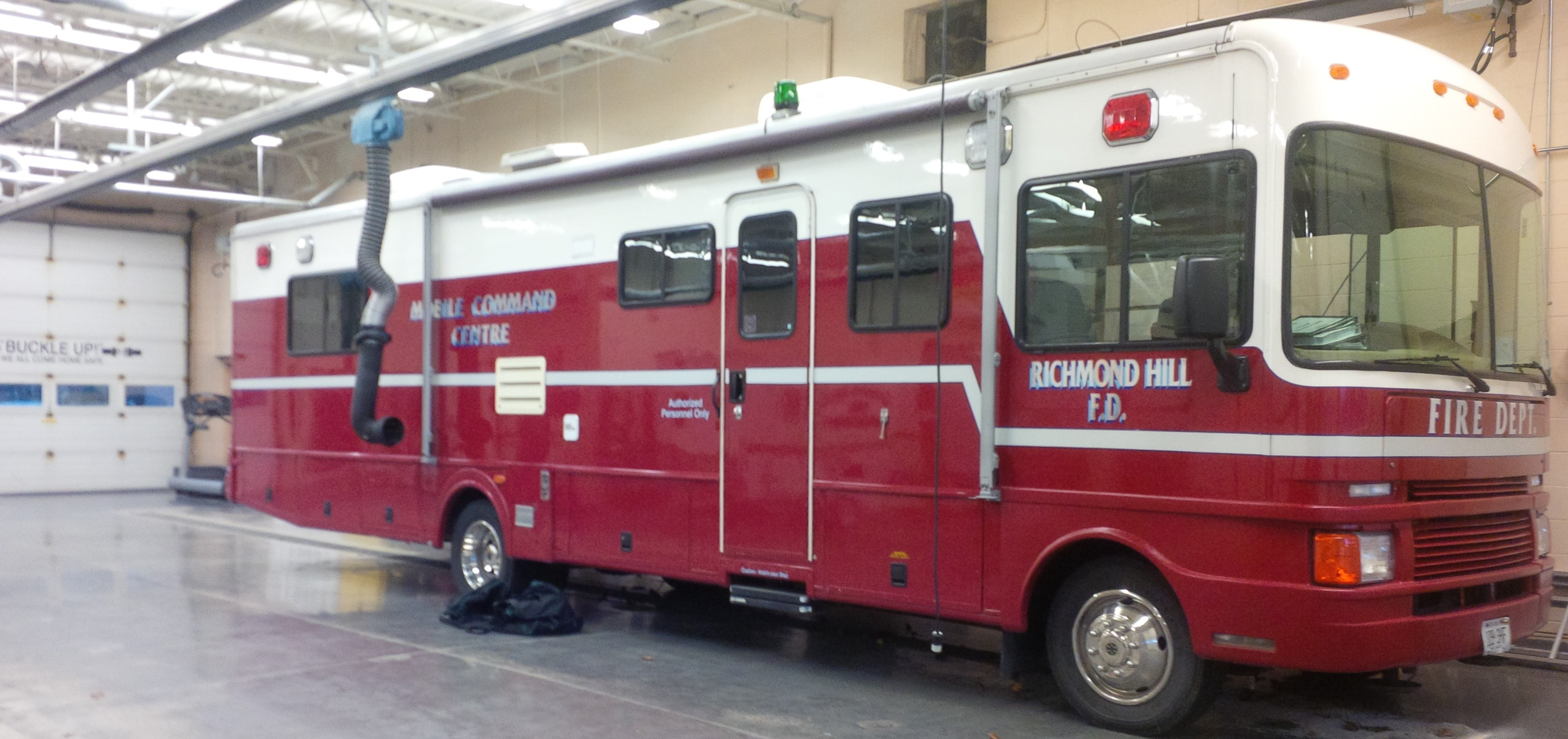
Richmond Hill Fire mobile command unit

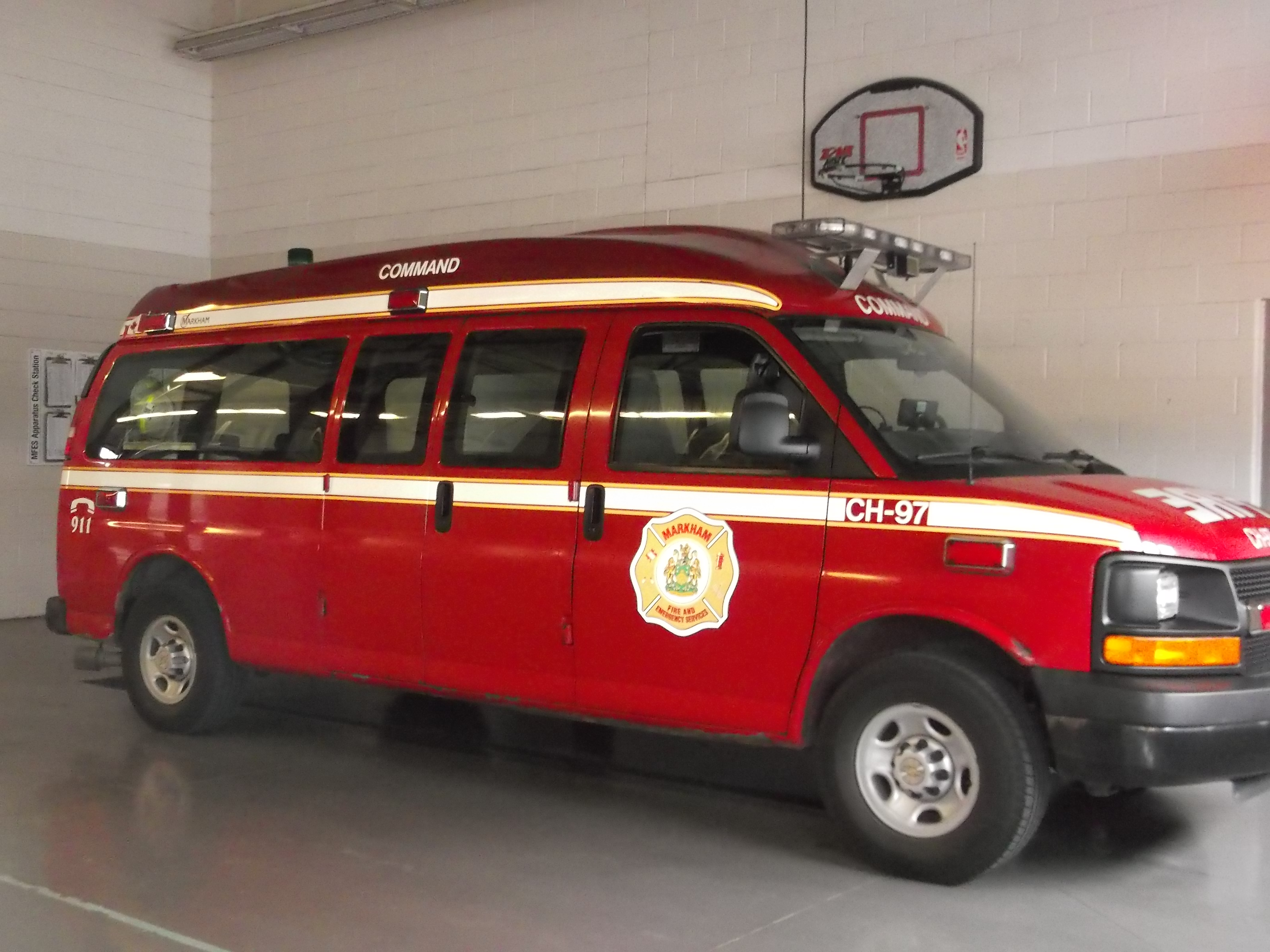
Markham Fire mobile command unit

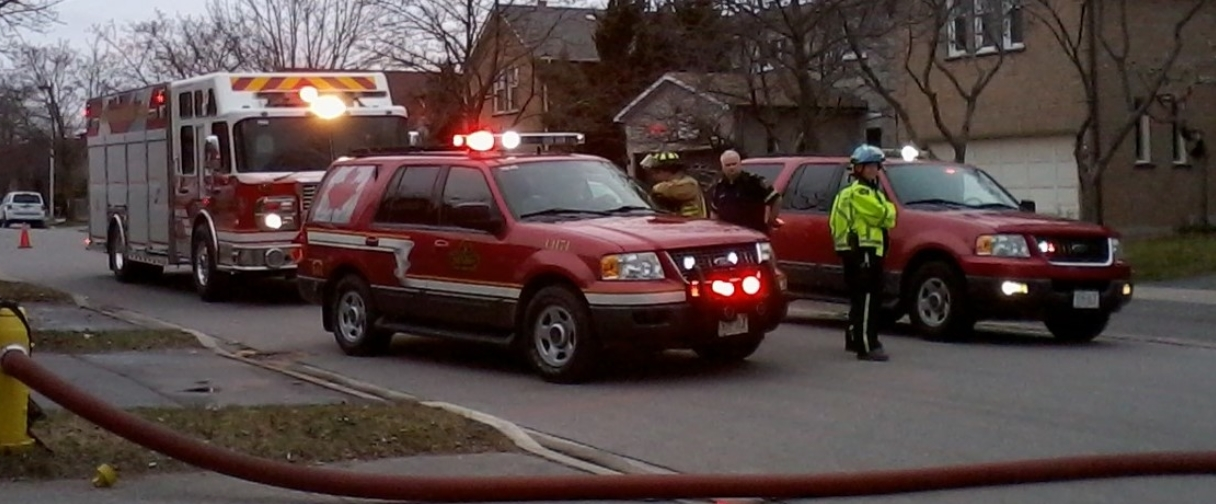
Vaughan Fire chief and platoon chief coordinating activities on site of a house fire in 2014

Each department has their own Chief and senior officers (Deputy Chiefs). The command structure is for the most part similar in the fire services across the region:

Markham

- Chief
  - Deputy Chief (2)

King

- Chief and Community Emergency Management Coordinator
  - Deputy Chief and alternate Community Emergency Management Coordinator

Central York

- Chief
  - Deputy Chief, Operations
  - Deputy Chief, Support Services
  - Assistant Deputy Chief, Training and Emergency Management

East Gwillimbury

- Chief
  - Deputy Chief (1)

Georgina

- Chief
  - Deputy Chief and Community Emergency Management Coordinator

Richmond Hill

- Chief
  - Deputy Chief (2)

Vaughan

- Chief
  - Deputy Chief (3)
  - Assistant Deputy Chief (1)

Whitchurch-Stouffville

- Chief
  - Deputy Chief (1)

== Rank ==
- Fire Chief
- Deputy Chief
- Assistant Deputy Chief
- Platoon Chief
- Chief Fire Prevention Officer
- Chief Training Officer
- Chief Mechanical Officer
- District Chief
- Captain / Company Officer
- Communications Supervisor
- Communications Operator
- Training Officer
- Fire Prevention Officer
- Firefighter
- Fire Inspector
- Volunteer Firefighter
- Recruit Firefighter
- Administrative Assistant

== Operations ==
Even though Bradford West Gwillimbury is not part of York Region, Bradford West Gwillimbury Fire and Emergency Services uses the same numbering system for its apparatus (I.E.: Station 1 is numbered as 10-1)

=== Georgina ===
Town of Georgina Fire and Rescue
Agency overview
- Established: 1978
- Employees: 40 Fulltime Firefighters, 1 Training Officer, 3 Fire Prevention staff and 60 Volunteers
- Staffing: Composite - Full Time and volunteer
- Fire chief: Ron Jenkins
- EMS level: ALS & BLS

Facilities and equipment
- Stations: 3
- Engines: 3
- Trucks: 2
- Rescues: 2
- Ambulances: see York Region EMS
- Tenders: 4

Town of Georgina Fire and Rescue provides fire fighting services to the communities of Keswick, Sutton and Pefferlaw. The department deals mainly with rural fire situations (residential, commercial and agriculture fires), but it has marine and hazmat capabilities. Georgina Fire and Rescue has a mix of full-time and volunteer staff with total strength of 90 personnel. A fleet of 11 apparatus are spread across 3 stations. Georgina Fire and Rescue was created from the merger of several local fire departments including Keswick Fire Department and Georgina Fire Department.

Georgina Fire Rescue launched a 34' Stanley Aluminium Fire and Rescue Boat in May 2020. At the time they are the only service with true firefighting capability (SCBA, Hose, Nozzles, etc) for operating on the south shore of the Lake. The Fireboat is designated as Marine 2. Marine 1 is the Georgina Fire Rescue Airboat utilized for Lake Rescue during the ice and winter season. The service is supported by York Regional Police in marine firefighting on Lake Simcoe by use of MU2 Naawig, a patrol boat equipped with a water nozzle.

=== East Gwillimbury ===
East Gwillimbury Emergency Services Department
Agency overview
- Established: 1970
- Employees: 27 per hall
- Staffing: Volunteer (Queensville 2 Full-time daytime weekdays)
- Fire chief: Phillip Dawson
- EMS level: ALS & BLS

Facilities and equipment
- Stations: 3
- Engines: 4
- Trucks: 1
- Rescues: 3
- Ambulances: see York Region EMS
- Tenders: 4

East Gwillimbury Emergency Services serves the communities of Holland Landing, Mount Albert and Queensville. The fire service operates over an area of 238 square kilometres or 91.89 square miles (238.0 km^{2}). The department has a full-time fire chief, fire prevention officer and training officer. In addition six full-time firefighters are on duty in two shifts during daytime hours in the Queensville firehall. All other firefighters are volunteers and each station has a staff of 27 and all must be residents of the Town of East Gwillimbury. The fire service is capable of handling a variety of situations, but it is mostly a rural fire service. This fire department responds to approximately 1000 emergency calls each year. Expected growth to East Gwillimbury will result in massive changes to the town's population and the change from a part-time paid on-call fire department to full-time staffed 24 hours in the near future. The service began as independent fire stations in 1970 and unified after 1997.

=== King Township ===
King Township Fire & Emergency Services
Agency overview
- Employees: 150
- Staffing: Volunteer
- Fire chief: James Wall
- EMS level: ALS & BLS
- Motto: "Duty trust & honour

Facilities and equipment
- Stations: 3
- Engines: 3
- Trucks: 2
- Squads: 3
- Rescues: 1
- Ambulances: see York Region EMS
- Tenders: 5

King Township Fire & Emergency Services serves the communities of King City, Nobleton, and Schomberg. It serves an area of 333 square kilometres and a population of about 28,000 residents. The service is composed of volunteer fire fighters.

=== Central York Fire Services ===
Central York Fire Services
Agency overview
- Established: 2002
- Employees: 112 firefighters + 28 Company Officers + 4 Seniors Officers
- Staffing: Full Time
- Fire chief: Ian Laing

Facilities and equipment
- Stations: 5
- Engines: 9
- Trucks: 3
- Ambulances: see York Region EMS
- Tenders: 1

Central York Fire Services provides fire services to both the Town of Newmarket and the Town of Aurora. It has 112 firefighters, 28 Captains and 4 Platoon Chiefs on staff at five fire stations. The fire service was created from the amalgamation of the former Town of Newmarket Fire Department and Town of Aurora Fire Department in 2002. The service has 15 vehicles of which 12 are fire fighting ones.

=== Whitchurch–Stouffville ===
Whitchurch–Stouffville Fire Department
Agency overview
- Established: 1898 (Village of Stouffville)
- Employees: 64
- Staffing: Composite - Full Time and volunteer
- Fire chief: William (Bill) Snowball
- EMS level: ALS & BLS

Facilities and equipment
- Stations: 2
- Engines: 3
- Trucks: 1
- Rescues: 1
- Ambulances: see York Region EMS

Whitchurch-Stouffville Fire Department provides fire fighting services to Whitchurch–Stouffville. The services protects 38,000 residents with 24 full-time fire suppression staff, 2 full-time fire prevention Officers, training officer and a full-time administrative assistant. There are also 50 volunteer firefighters. The service has 10 vehicles in their fleet.

=== City of Vaughan ===
Vaughan Fire and Rescue
Agency overview
- Established: 1971
- Employees: 266
- Staffing: Full Time
- EMS level: ALS & BLS
- Motto: Pride and Honour

Facilities and equipment
- Stations: 10
- Engines: 8
- Trucks: 1
- Platforms: 1
- Quints: 5
- Rescues: 2
- Ambulances: see York Region EMS

Vaughan Fire and Rescue Service provides fire and emergency needs to the communities in the City of Vaughan (Maple, Kleinburg, Concord, Thornhill west of Yonge Street and Woodbridge). There are over 250 firefighters on staff all are full-time. The city did have volunteers in Woodbridge Station 7-3 and Kleinburg Station 7-4. Station 7-3 disbanded its volunteers in the early 2000s with the remainder of the volunteers being disbanded in 2013 with the closure of Station 7-4 in Kleinburg. The service deals with rural scenarios in the north / northwest and urban in the south part of the city.

=== Richmond Hill ===
Richmond Hill Fire & Emergency Services
Agency overview
- Established: 1881
- Employees: 172
- Staffing: Full Time
- Fire chief: Bryan Burbidge
- EMS level: ALS & BLS

Facilities and equipment
- Stations: 6
- Engines: 5
- Trucks: 1
- Rescues: 1
- Ambulances: see York Region EMS

Richmond Hill Fire & Emergency Services provides fire services to the City of Richmond Hill. It has 140 fire fighters on staff at 6 fire stations. Richmond Hill also offers specialized technical rescue services including water and ice rescue, technical rope rescue, confined space rescue, trench rescue and hazardous materials response. Richmond Hill provides dispatch services to Georgina, East Gwillimbury, Central York, Whitchurch/Stouffville and Richmond Hill.

=== Markham ===
Markham Fire and Emergency Services
Agency overview
- Established: 1970
- Employees: 280
- Staffing: Full-time (since 1996)
- Fire chief: Chris Nearing
- EMS level: ALS & BLS

Facilities and equipment
- Stations: 9
- Engines: 11
- Trucks: 3
- Rescues: 1
- Ambulances: see York Region EMS

Markham Fire has 200 firefighters on staff and is responsible for fire support for the City of Markham, as well as Toronto/Buttonville Municipal Airport. The newest station is 9-9, which opened in February 2012. The service began as the Markham Village Fire Department (c. 1870s) and acquired Unionville Fire Department in 1964. The Markham Fire Department was created in 1970 and renamed with the current name in 2000. Volunteer fire members were disbanded in 1996.

Markham Fire and Emergency Services provides fire protection to the following communities in the City of Markham:

- Unionville
- Cornell
- Cachet
- Milliken
- Armadale
- Dickson Hill
- Buttonville
- Thornhill

Fire Chiefs

- Myrl Smith 1970-1985
- Ken Beckett 1985-1996 - now Fire Chief in East Gwillimbury
- Tony Mintoff 1996-1999
- Bob Myles 1999 - acting Chief
- Shayne Mintz 1999 - acting Chief
- Don McClean 1999-2010 - career firefighter left department to complete law studies at Osgoode Law School
- Bill Snowball 2010-2016
- Dave Decker 2016-2020
- Adam Grant 2020-2023
- Chris Nearing 2023 -

=== Georgina Island ===
Fire services on Fox Island, Georgina Island and Snake Island are provided by Georgina Island Fire Department under the Chippewas of Georgina Island First Nation. The department has two full time firefighters and numerous trained volunteers.

== Fire stations and apparatus ==
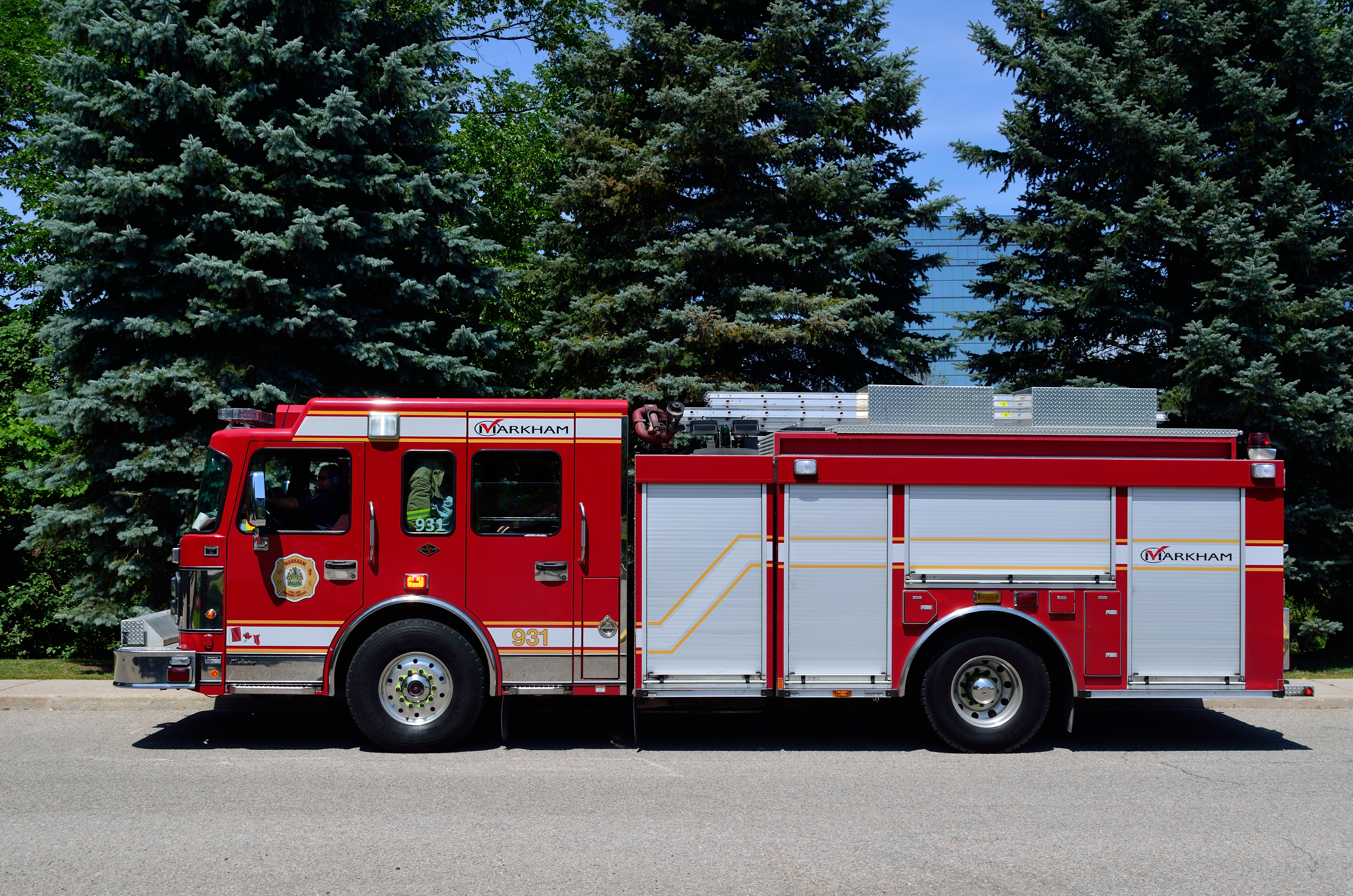
A Markham Fire pumper

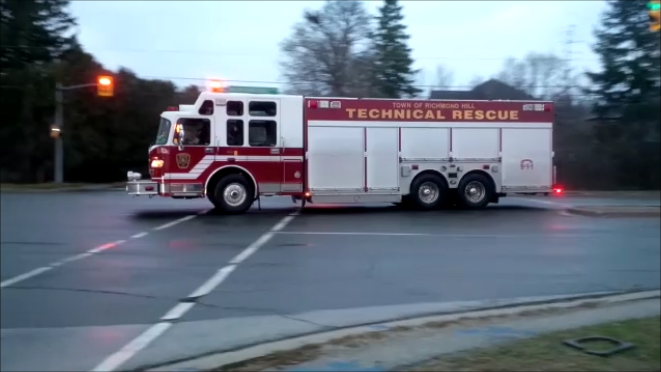
A Richmond Hill Fire Technical Rescue unit

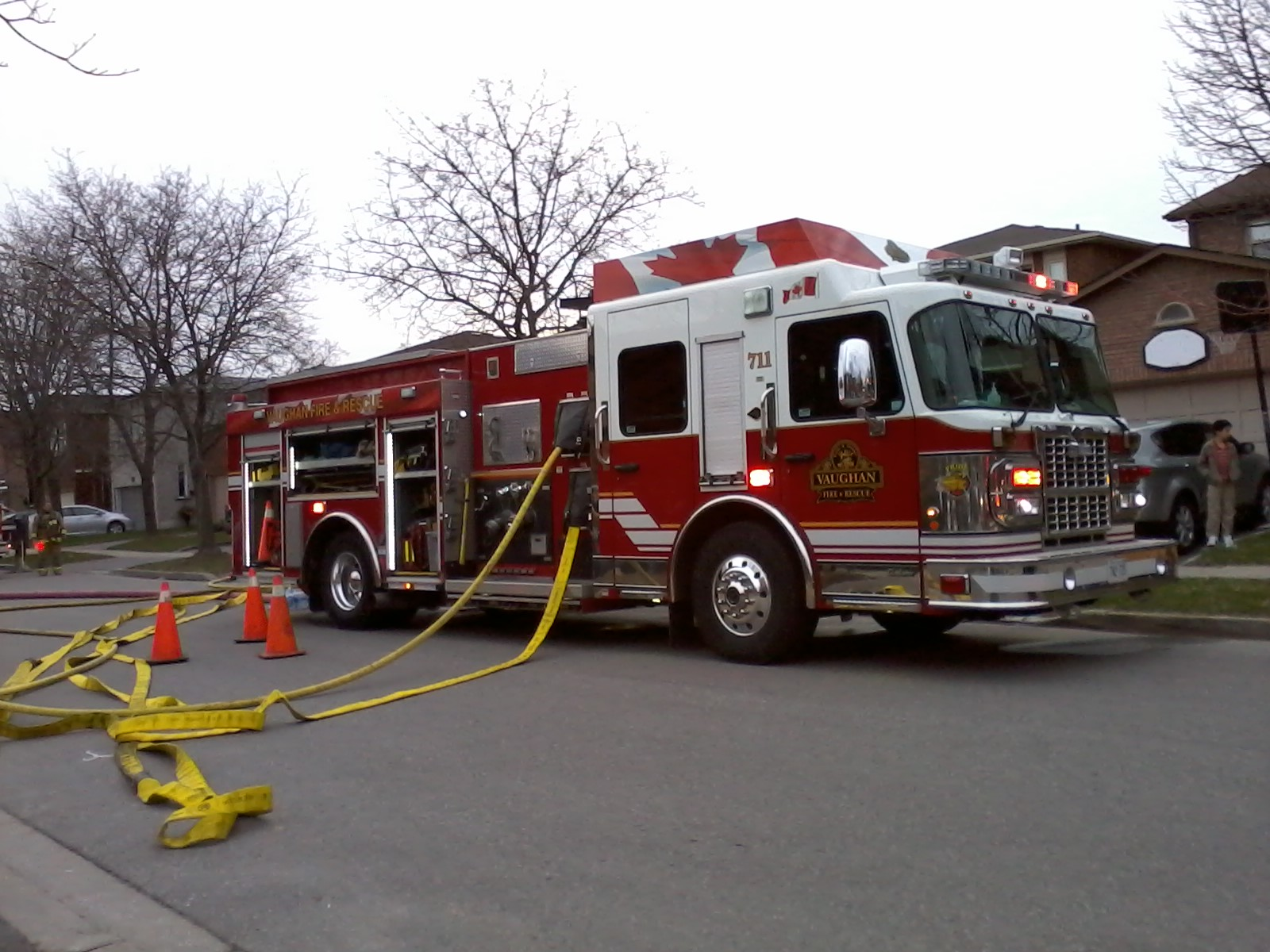
Vaughan Fire pumper

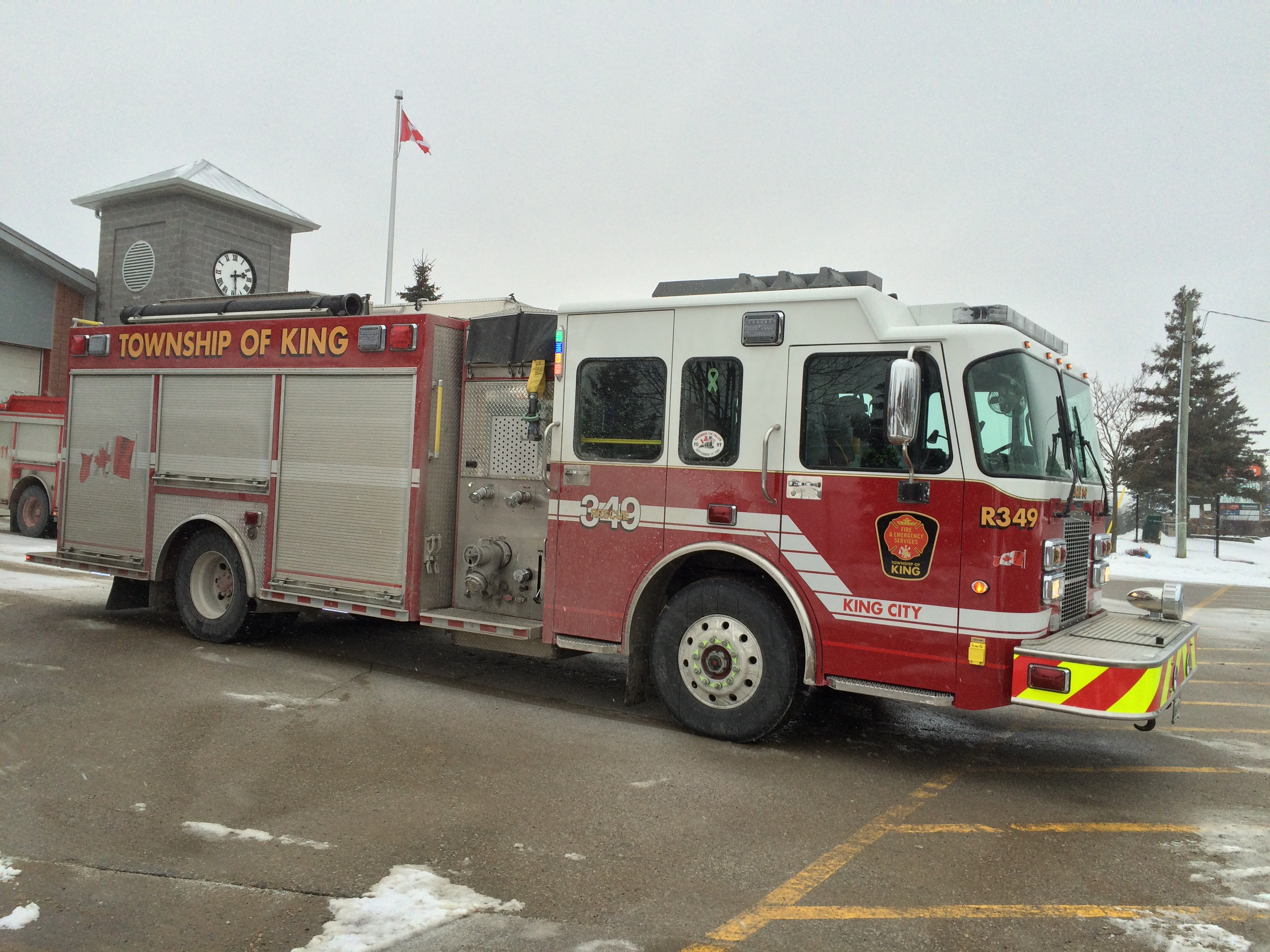
A King Township Fire rescue

York Region's fire apparatus use fire engine red as the base colour. Trim varies from yellow, white and blue.

Markham and Vaughan were one of a number of municipalities to have formerly used a yellow paint scheme.

APPARATUS DESIGNATIONS - The numbering works like this:

- The first digit is the municipality
- The second digit is the station number
- The third digit is the apparatus number
  - 1 - Engine (Pumper)
  - 2 - Engine (Pumper)
  - 3 - Squirt (Telescoping boom)
  - 4 - Tanker
  - 5 - Tanker
  - 6 - Aerial (Ladder)
  - 7 - Aerial Platform
  - 8 - Haz-Mat
  - 9 - Rescue or Rescue Pumper
  - 0 - Utility

The apparatus numbers are pronounced by saying each digit individually. For example, 729 would be pronounced Seven-Two-Nine, NOT Seven Twenty Nine, and 849 would be pronounced Eight-Four-Nine, NOT Eight Forty Nine, and so on.

For units with 4 digits, such as Fire Prevention, Training, and spare apparatus, the last 3 digits are pronounced individually from the first digit. For example, 4401 would be pronounced Four-Four-Zero-One, NOT Forty-Four-O-One.

Station #	Municipality	Engine Company, Engine Rescue Company or Pumper Company	Tanker Units	Aerial Company, Ladder Company or Platform Company	Rescue Company, Rescue Engine Company, Rescue Pumper Company or Tech Rescue Company	Miscellaneous or Support Units	Address	Notes
1-4	Georgina	Engine 141	Tanker 144	Platform 147	Rescue Pumper 149	Unit 140	165 The Queensway South, Keswick	Career and volunteer staffing.
1-6	Georgina		Tanker 164	Aerial 166	Rescue Pumper 169	Unit 160	37 Snooks Road, Sutton	Career and volunteer staffing.
1-8	Georgina	Engine 181; Engine 182	Tanker 184 Tanker 185				270 Pefferlaw Road, Pefferlaw	Volunteer staffing.
1-9	Georgina Island	Pump 191	Tanker 194				Chief Joseph Snake Road	
2-4	East Gwillimbury		Tanker 244	Aerial 246	Rescue Pumper 249		19314 Yonge Street, Holland Landing	Volunteer staffing.
2-6	East Gwillimbury	Engine 261	Tanker 264		Rescue Pumper 269		22 Princess Street, Mount Albert	Volunteer staffing. Station rebuilt after fire in February 2014.
2-8	East Gwillimbury	Engine 281	Tanker 284	Aerial 286			1590 Queensville Sideroad, Queensville	Career and volunteer staffing.
3-4	Township of King	Engine 341	Tanker 344; Tanker 345	Ladder 346	Rescue Pumper 349		2045 King Road, King City	
3-6	Township of King	Engine 361	Tanker 364; Tanker 365	Ladder 366	Rescue Pumper 369	Command 30; 2x parade units	91 Proctor Road, Schomberg	
3-8	Township of King	Engine 381	Tanker 384		Rescue Pumper 382; Rescue 389	Parade unit	5926 King Road, Nobleton	
4-1	Central York	Engine 411; Engine 412					984 Gorham Street, Newmarket	Built in 1992.
4-2	Central York	Engine 421; Engine 422		Platform 427			125 McCaffrey Road, Newmarket	
4-3	Central York	Engine 431; Engine 432				Haz-Mat 438; Support 40; Parade unit	220 Edward Street, Aurora	Built in 1978.
4-4	Central York	Engine 441	Tanker 444	Aerial 446			1344 Wellington Street East, Aurora	Built in 2005.
4-5	Central York	Engine 451		Aerial 456		Chief 4-5 (Platoon Chief); Car 4-5 (Spare command vehicle); Utility 410	300 Earl Stewart Drive, Aurora	Built in 2022. Department headquarters.
5-1	Whitchurch-Stouffville	Pump 511	Tanker 514	Platform 517	Rescue 519		100 Weldon Road, Stouffville	Built in 2009. Department headquarters.
5-2	Whitchurch-Stouffville	Pump 521; Pump 522	Tanker 524; Tanker 525			Service 520; Parade unit	15400 Highway 48, Ballantrae	Built in 1999.
7-1	Vaughan	Engine 711		Aerial 716			835 Clark Avenue West, Thornhill	Built in 1981.
7-2	Vaughan	Engine Rescue 721			Rescue 729	Utility 720; Chief 74 (Platoon Chief)	9290 Keele Street, Maple	Built in 1966.
7-3	Vaughan	Engine Rescue 731		Platform 737		Haz-Mat 738; Chief 7-3 (District Chief)	7690 Martin Grove Road, Woodbridge	Built in 2017.
7-4	Vaughan	Engine Rescue 741				Field Support unit	835 Nashville Road, Kleinburg	Opened in 2020.
7-5	Vaughan				Engine Rescue 759	Tech Rescue 758	2 Fieldstone Drive, Woodbridge	Built in 1997.
7-6	Vaughan			Engine 766; Platform 767		Parade unit	120 McCleary Court, Concord	Built in 1990.
7-7	Vaughan	Engine Rescue 771	Tanker 774				40 Eagleview Heights, Woodbridge	
7-8	Vaughan			Engine 786			111 Racco Parkway, Concord	Built in 2004.
7-9	Vaughan	Engine 791	Tanker 794				9601 Islington Avenue, Woodbridge	Built in 2007.
7-10	Vaughan	Engine 710-1				Command 701	10800 Dufferin Street, Maple	Built in 2012.
8-1	Richmond Hill	Engine 811			Rescue 819	Utility 810; Command 8-0; Command 8-3 (Platoon Chief)	191 Major Mackenzie Drive West	Built in 1978. Named after Alfred D. Stong.
8-2	Richmond Hill	Engine 821	Tanker 824		Rescue 829; Rescue 829B		13067 Yonge Street	Built in 1996. Named after Robert G. Kennedy.
8-3	Richmond Hill			Aerial 836		Aerial 896 (Reserve)	1371 16th Avenue	Built in 1989. Named after Harold J. Mills.
8-4	Richmond Hill	Engine 841	Tanker 844			Haz-Mat 848	1365 Elgin Mills Road East	Built in 1999. Named after Russell "Curly" Lynett.
8-5	Richmond Hill	Engine 851				Rescue 850; Engine 891 (Reserve)	150 High Tech Road	Built in 2001. Named after Bert Cook.
8-6	Richmond Hill	Engine 861	Tanker 864				101 Gamble Road	Built in 2012.
9-1	Markham	Pumper 911		Aerial 916			7801 Bayview Avenue	Opened in June 1990.
9-2	Markham	Pumper 921				Utility 920; Haz-Mat 928; Chief 97 (Battalion Chief - South Command)	10 Riviera Drive	Opened in May 2004.
9-3	Markham	Pumper 931				Aerial 9836 (spare)	2930 Major Mackenzie Drive East	Opened in July 2010.
9-4	Markham	Pumper 941				Pumper 9841 (Spare)	7300 Birchmount Road	Opened in 1985.
9-5	Markham	Pumper 951		Platform 957	Tech Rescue 959	Personnel Carrier 950; Chief 96 (Battalion Chief - North Command)	316 Main Street Unionville	Opened in 1978.
9-6	Markham	Pumper 961				Pumper 9861 (Spare); 960 Utility	5567 14th Avenue	Opened in 1996.
9-7	Markham	Pumper 971				Pumper 9871 (Spare); Parade unit	209 Main Street North, Markham Village	Opened in 1985.
9-8	Markham	Pumper 981				Air/Light 980	650 Bur Oak Avenue	Opened in 2006.
9-9	Markham	Pumper 991	Tanker 994			Aerial 996 (Spare)	3255 Bur Oak Avenue	Opened in 2012.

GEORGINA FIRE DEPARTMENT

- 141 - 1999 International / Fort Garry pumper
- 144 - 2018 Spartan Metro Star / Metalfab pumper tanker
- 147 - 2019 HME Ahrens-Fox 104' platform quint
- 149 - 2022 Spartan Metro Star / Dependable rescue pumper
- 140 - Dodge Ram 2500 4x4
- 164 - 2016 Spartan Metro Star / Dependable pumper tanker
- 166 - 2011 Spartan Metro Star / Crimson 75' quint
- 169 - 2017 Spartan Metro Star / Dependable rescue pumper
- 160 - Dodge Ram 2500 4x4
- 181 - 2011 Spartan Force / Crimson pumper
- 182 - 2002 Freightliner / Almonte pumper
- 184 - 2022 Spartan Metro Star / Dependable pumper tanker
- 185 - 2003 GMC / Almonte tanker
- Marine 1 - 1990 Husky Air Boat Marine Rescue
- Marine 2 - 2020 Stanley Boats
- Command 10 - HazMat/Emergency Operations Unit - Wells Cargo 24’ Trailer
- 1401 - 2007 Dodge Caravan - Fire Prevention Officer
- 1402 - 2005 Dodge Caravan - Fire Prevention Officer

Georgina Island Fire Department

Although not part of the York Region's fire services, the Chippewas of Georgina Island First Nation has their own fire and rescue capability.

- 191 - 2005 Fort Garry/Sterling Acterra pumper
- 194 - 2009 Fort Garry/Sterling Acterra tanker

EAST GWILLIMBURY EMERGENCY SERVICES

- 244 - 2011 Spartan Metro Star / Rosenbauer pumper-tanker
- 246 - 2018 HME Ahrens-Fox 111' quint
- 249 - 2016 Freightliner M2 / Dependable rescue pumper
- 261 - 2014 Spartan ERV Metro Star pumper
- 264 - 2015 Spartan Gladiator Dependable pumper-tanker
- 269 - 2016 Freightliner M2 / Dependable rescue pumper
- 281 - 2008 Spartan Advantage / Rosenbauer engine
- 284 - 2015 Spartan Metro Star Dependable pumper-tanker
- 286 - 2003 Freightliner FL80 / Rosenbauer 65' aerial

KING TOWNSHIP FIRE & EMERGENCY SERVICES

- 341 - 2018 Spartan Metro Star / Dependable pumper
- 344 - 2017 Kenworth / Dependable tanker
- 345 - 2009 Kenworth / Dependable tanker
- 346 - 2011 Spartan Gladiator Classic / Crimson 100' quint (purchased in 2013)
- 349 - 2001 Spartan Advantage / Dependable rescue pumper (2016 refurb)
- 340 - 2012 Ford F350 Super Duty - Utility
- 3401 - 2006 Ford Fusion - Fire Prevention
- 3402 - 2016 Chevrolet Equinox - Fire Prevention
- CH31 - 2017 Chevrolet Silverado 1500 LT - Chief
- CH32 - 2017 Chevrolet Silverado 1500 LT - Deputy Chief
- 360 - 2020 Chevrolet Silverado 2500 HD Utility
- 361 - 2004 American LaFrance pumper
- 362 - 1969 Ford/LaFrance pumper (Retired-Parade/Training Unit)
- 366 - 2018 HME Ahrens-Fox 80' quint
- 364 - 2017 Kenworth/ Dependable tanker
- 365 - 2002 Freightliner/Dependable tanker
- 369 - 2001 Spartan / Dependable rescue pumper
- Command 30 - 2019 Freightliner / Dependable rehab command unit
- 1929 International/Bickle Antique Engine (Retired Parade Unit)(Original Schomberg Unit)
- 1940 Ford Antique Engine (Retired Parade Unit)
- 381 - 2007 Ferrara Inferno
- 382 - 2001 Spartan Advantage / Dependable Rescue Pumper
- 384 - 2009 Kenworth Tanker / Dependable
- 389 - 2009 Dependable Heavy Rescue
- 380 - 2019 Chevrolet Silverado 2500HD Utility

CENTRAL YORK FIRE SERVICES

- CH44 - 2017 Ford Expedition command vehicle
- CH45 - 2012 Ford Expedition command vehicle
- U410 - 2016 Ford F-350 pick-up
- E411 - 2019 Spartan Metro Star / Dependable rescue pumper
- E412 - 2022 Spartan Metro Star LFD / Dependable
- E421 - 2019 Spartan Metro Star / Dependable rescue pumper
- P427 - 2013 Spartan Gladiator / Smeal 100' platform-quint
- E431 - 2014 Spartan ERV Gladiator rescue pumper
- E432 - 2022 Spartan Metro Star LFD / Dependable
- H438 - 1999 Freightliner Rescue / Hazardous Material Response Unit
- E441 - 2012 Spartan Gladiator Classic ELFD / Crimson
- T444 - 2012 Spartan Gladiator / Smeal pumper-tanker
- A446 - 2017 Spartan Metro Star / Smeal 55' quint
- E451 - 2020 Spartan Metro Star ELFD / Dependable
- A456 - 2012 Spartan Gladiator / Smeal 105' quint
- 1931 Bickle Antique Fire Engine - Historic Unit
- 1926 International Lorne Engine - Historic Unit

WHITCHURCH-STOUFFVILLE FIRE & EMERGENCY SERVICES

- 511 - 2026 Spartan Metro Star / Dependable Pumper
- 512 - 2017 Spartan Metro Star / Smeal Rescue Pumper
- 514 - 2008 Spartan Metro Star / Seagrave pumper-tanker (2025 Referb)
- 515 - 2011 International DuraStar /Asphoel Tanker
- 517 - 2016 Spartan ERV Gladiator 100' platform tower ladder
- 519 - 2009 Spartan Metro Star / Seagrave heavy rescue
- 521 - 2022 Spartan Metro Star / Smeal Pumper
- 522 - 2008 Spartan Metro Star / Seagrave Rescue Pumper
- 524 - 2026 Spartan Metro Star / Dependable Pumper
- 525 - 2023 Kentworth /Metalfab Tanker

VAUGHAN FIRE & RESCUE SERVICE

- Chief 7-3 - District Chief
- Chief 7-4 - Platoon Chief
- 711 - 2011 Spartan Gladiator / Smeal pumper
- 716 - 2017 Spartan Gladiator / Smeal 105' quint
- 721 - 2019 Spartan Metro Star / Smeal rescue pumper
- 729 - 2014 Spartan Metro Star / SVI heavy rescue
- 720 - 2011 Ford utility truck
- 731 - 2014 Spartan Metro Star / Smeal rescue pumper
- 737 - 2009 Spartan Gladiator / Smeal 100' platform quint
- 738 - 2018 Spartan Metro Star / SVI haz-mat unit
- 741 - 2014 Spartan Metro Star / Smeal rescue pumper
- 758 - 2005 Freightliner M2 / Dependable technical rescue
- 759 - 2019 Spartan Metro Star / Smeal rescue pumper
- 766 - 2019 Spartan Metro Star / Smeal 55' quint
- 771 - 2019 Spartan Metro Star / Smeal rescue pumper
- 774 - 2004 Peterbilt 330 / Danko tanker
- 786 - 2019 Spartan Metro Star / Smeal 55' quint
- 791 - 2006 Spartan Advantage / Smeal pumper
- 710-1 - 2011 Spartan Gladiator Classic / Smeal pumper
- 701

RICHMOND HILL FIRE & EMERGENCY SERVICES

- Command 8-0 (Command Post) 1999 Motor Coach
- Command 8-3 (Platoon Chief)- 2019 Ford F-150
- 811 - 2015 Spartan ERV Gladiator rescue pumper
- 819 - 2006 Spartan Gladiator / Dependable technical heavy rescue
- 821 - 2014 Spartan ERV Gladiator rescue pumper
- 824 - 2004 Freightliner / Dependable tanker
- 829 - 1992 Ford Super Duty - Water Rescue Unit (Zodiac Boat Trailer)
- 836 - 2017 Ferrara Inferno 107' quint
- 841 - 2014 Spartan ERV Gladiator rescue pumper
- 844 - 2013 International / Spartan ERV pumper-tanker
- 848 - 2018 Freightliner / Maxi Metal haz-mat unit
- 851 - 2015 Spartan ERV Gladiator rescue pumper
- 861 - 2019 Spartan ERV Gladiator rescue pumper
- 864 - 2004 Freightliner / Dependable tanker

MARKHAM FIRE & EMERGENCY SERVICES

- CH96 - Battalion Chief - North Command
- CH97 - Battalion Chief - South Command
- 911 - 2014 Spartan Metro Star / Smeal pumper
- 916 - 2014 Spartan Gladiator Classic / Smeal 105' quint
- 920 - 2023 Freightliner M2 / Drago
- 921 - 2017 Spartan Metro Star / Smeal pumper
- 928 - Hazmat Trailer
- 931 - 2010 Spartan Gladiator / Smeal pumper
- 941 - 2019 Spartan Metro Star / Smeal pumper
- 950 - Utility Vehicle
- 951 - 2010 Spartan Gladiator / Smeal pumper
- 957 - 2015 Spartan Gladiator / Smeal 100' platform quint
- 959 - 2017 Ford Cube Van / Technical Rescue
- 960 - 2023 Freightliner M2 / Drago
- 961 - 2014 Spartan Metro Star / Smeal pumper
- 971 - 2014 Spartan Metro Star / Smeal pumper
- 980 - 2024 Freightliner M2 / Dependable air/light unit
- 981 - 2015 Spartan Metro Star / Smeal pumper
- 991 - 2012 Spartan Metro Star / Smeal pumper
- 994 - 2015 International / Danko tanker

== See also ==
- York Region Paramedic Services
- York Regional Police
