= Vaughan Fire and Rescue Services =

Fire department serving the city of Vaughan, Ontario

Operational area
- Country: Canada
- Province: Ontario
- Address: 2800 Rutherford Rd, Concord, ON L4K 2N9

Agency overview
- Established: 1971
- Employees: 350 (2018)
- Commissioner: Mary Reali
- Fire chief: Andrew Zvanitajs
- EMS level: ALS and BLS
- Motto: Pride and Honour

Facilities and equipment
- Stations: 10
- Engines: 8
- Trucks: 5
- Platforms: 1
- Squads: 1
- Rescues: 1
- Ambulances: See York Region EMS
- HAZMAT: 1

Website
- Official website

Vaughan Fire and Rescue Services (VFRS) provides fire protection, technical rescue services, hazardous materials response, and first responder emergency medical assistance to the city of Vaughan, Ontario. It operates 10 fire stations and coordinates with other fire departments in York Region and the Greater Toronto Area. VFRS received a 100 per cent satisfaction rating in the City of Vaughan’s 2018 Citizen Survey.

== History ==
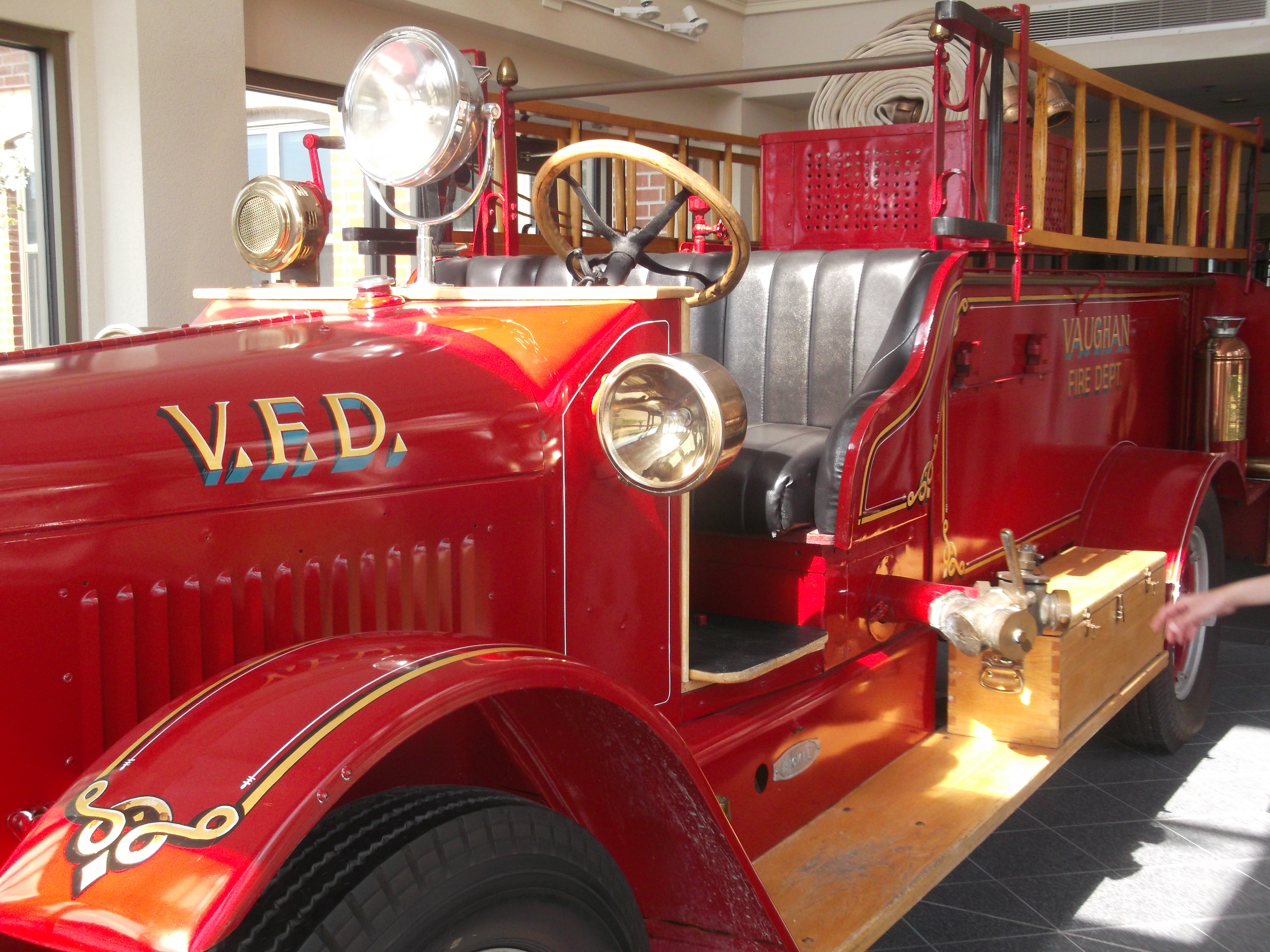
One of VFRS's first trucks

VFRS was established as the "Vaughan Fire Department" in the late 1800s in the Township of Vaughan. At the time, the department covered Markham sections of Thornhill in addition to Vaughan. In 1970, the Markham Fire Department opened and took over all areas of Markham.

The use of the title "Fire Department" gave way to "Fire and Rescue" as the firefighters' roles expanded in the 1990s.

In 2001, York Region was planning to merge all fire services in the region into one large unit. Resistance from firefighters and others prevented the plan from being implemented. This was attempted again in 2013, also with no outcome.

== Staffing ==
As of 2018, there are 350 uniformed personnel; all are full-time. The city previously had volunteers in Station 7-3 and Station 7-4. The city no longer has volunteer firefighters. Station 7-3 disbanded its volunteers in the early 2000s, and the remainder of the volunteers were disbanded in 2013 when Station 7-4 closed.

== Operations ==
=== Operations Division ===
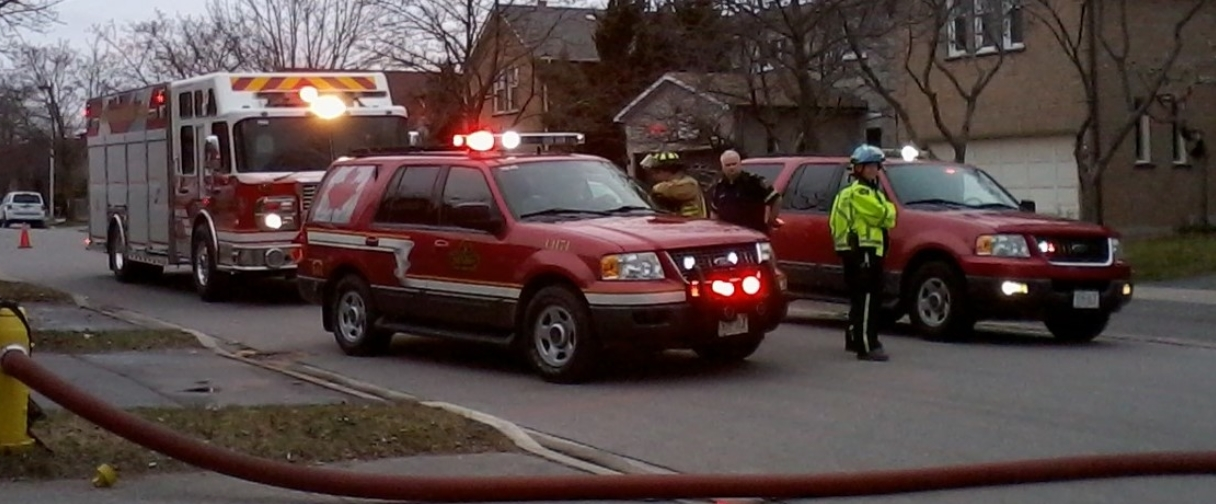
Vaughan Fire chief and platoon chief coordinating activities on site of a house fire in 2014

Vaughan Fire and Rescue Service's biggest division is the Operations Division. It is responsible for responding to emergency calls. VFRS's total average response time to emergencies is six minutes and 19 seconds. The most common emergency calls are medical calls, with 36% of calls in 2015 being medical related. VFRS also responds to many false alarms, with 24% of calls in 2015 being false alarms. In the north parts of the city, VFRS primarily deals with rural scenarios, and in the south parts of the city the incidents are largely urban.

=== Communications ===
The VFRS Communications Division uses a Computer Aided Dispatch (CAD) system to dispatch fire apparatus to calls. The division works with the York Regional Police 9-1-1 centre, the Georgian Central Ambulance Communications Centre, and the surrounding municipal fire department communications centres in order to coordinate the emergency needs of the community. VFRS is also contracted to provide emergency communications services to Township of King. In 2015, the Communications Division processed 10,428 emergency calls for Vaughan and 1,002 calls for King Township Fire Service, totaling 11,430 calls for the year. All of Vaughan’s fire communicators are certified by the Association of Public Safety Communications Operators (APCO) Institute. The Communication Division's motto is "The Voice of VFRS”.

=== Training Division ===
VFRS firefighters are required to complete specific annual maintenance training. The firefighters in VFRS are all either certified or working towards their certification. It takes approximately four years to meet the requirements of certification.

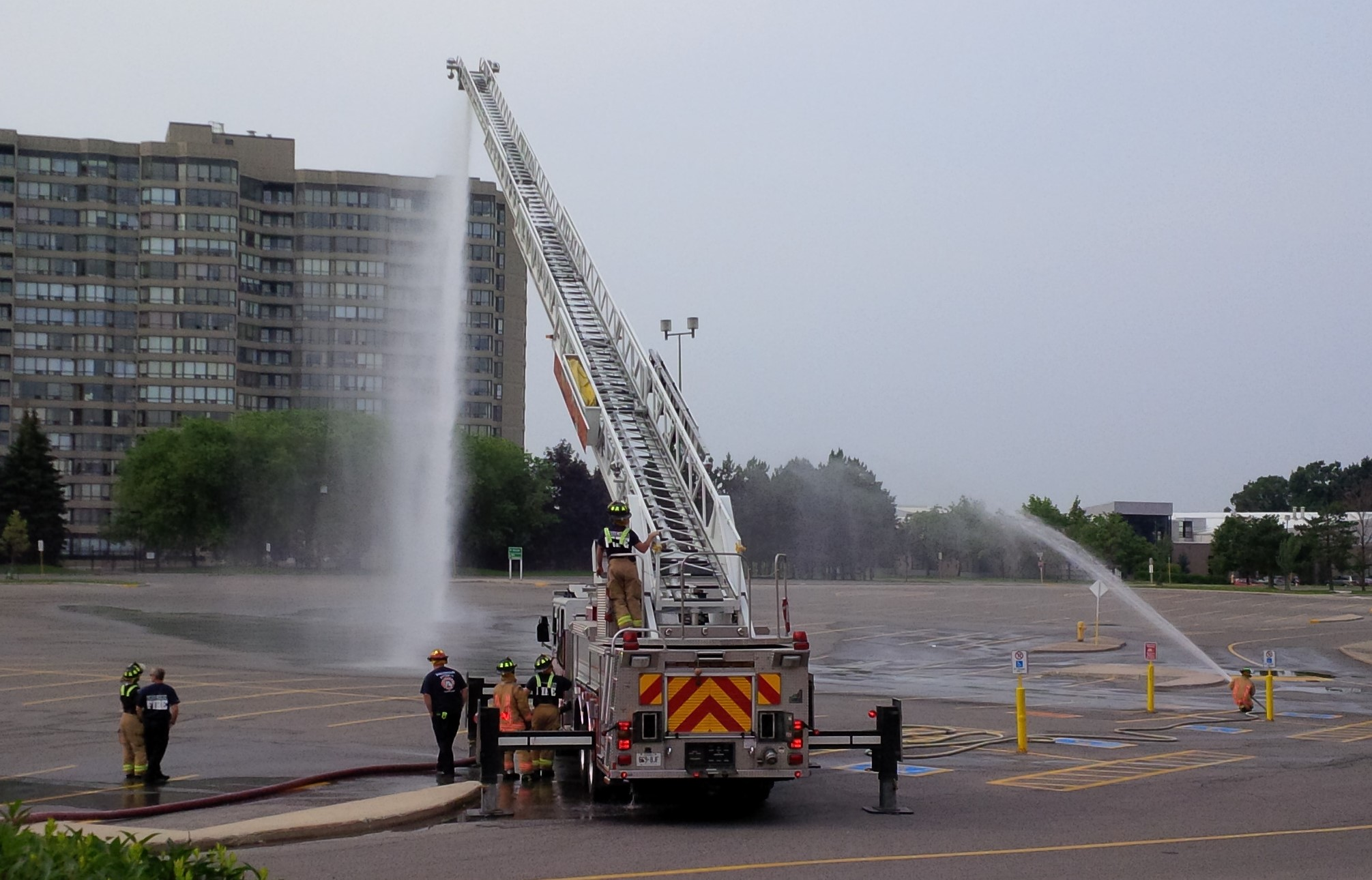
Vaughan Fire training exercise

Once certified, firefighters must continue to meet a number of objectives in order to meet the requirements of re-certification. All of the staff of the VFRS Training Division have either already met or are working towards the requirement as “Certified Training Officers". All of VFRS's firefighters attained certification in NFPA 1006 core competencies for technical rescue. All service delivery enhancements for the public must first be implemented through the Training Division. The Training Division is currently undertaking the delivery of Ontario Fire College programs in-house.

VFRS is one of the fire departments in the GTA which has access to York University's Advanced Disaster, Emergency and Rapid-response Simulation (ADERSIM). This is a tool which was designed to model and simulate responses to emergency incidents. VFRS has used this model to analyze response times and other key performance indicators to in turn facilitate evidence-based decision-making for fire station location placement, the prioritization of new road networks, and allocation of resources.

=== Fire Prevention Division ===
The VFRS Fire Prevention Division is the division that is responsible for educating the population of Vaughan on how to take precautions to prevent potentially harmful fires, and how to be educated about surviving them. The Fire Prevention Division provides inspections and plan reviews for fire/carbon monoxide alarms, sprinkler systems, fire extinguishers, and general fire hazards. They conduct building inspections to make sure they are compliant with fire codes, and they visit schools and daycare centers to make presentations about arson, malicious false alarms, and fire safety.

One of the Fire Prevention Division's responsibilities is to educate seniors about fire safety. In addition to their annual inspections and witnessing of fire drills for all retirement homes and care facilities throughout Vaughan, the Fire Prevention Division together with B.A.S.S.I.C. (Bringing an Awareness of Senior Safety Issues to the Community) delivers fire safety education to approximately 700 attendees at B.A.S.S.I.C.'s annual senior’s symposium.

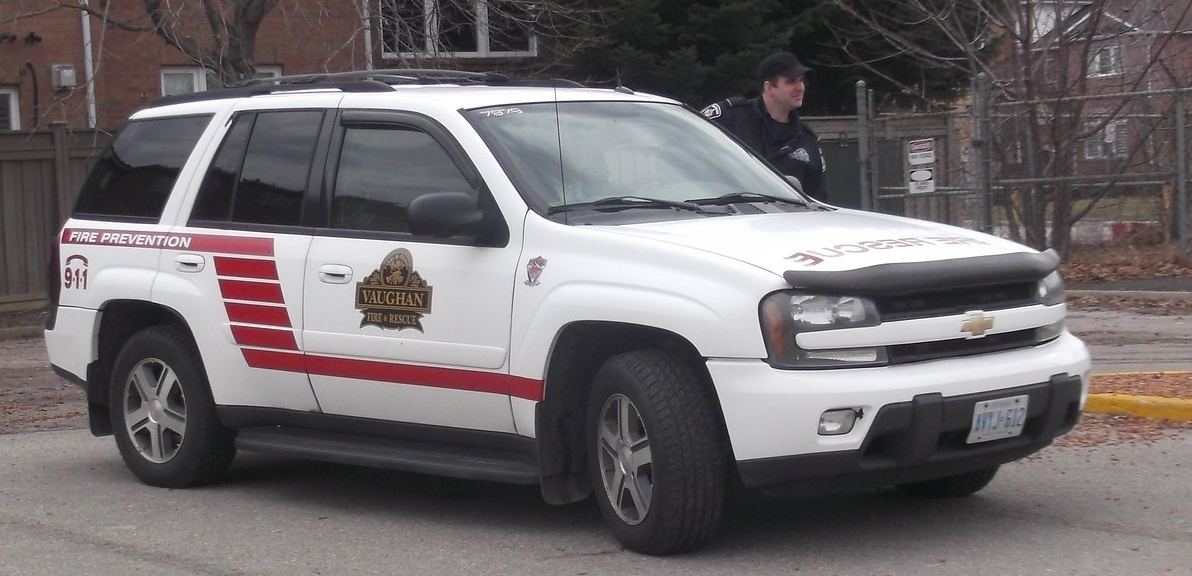
A VFRS fire prevention division officer exits his vehicle as he arrives on scene

The Fire Prevention division is sometimes called to scenes of fires which look like arson to the firefighters on scene. Upon arrival, the division looks into it, and if they decide it is suspicious, they contact the Ontario Fire Marshall and York Regional Police to further investigate.

=== Mechanical Division ===
The VFRS Mechanical Division is responsible for ensuring that all of VFRS's apparatus/equipment is in operationally ready state. They do this using the current Ministry of Transportation of Ontario Standards and National Fire Protection Association guidelines as benchmarks. Members of the Mechanical Division attend Emergency Vehicle Technician courses every year. The division provides both in-shop and mobile mechanical service for a number of Regional Emergency Service partners as well as a warranty repair depot for major fire service equipment suppliers and manufacturers.

The Mechanical Division is known for implementing on board GREEN generators for all of VFRS's engines/rescues. This technology automatically kicks in when the apparatus is at idle for more than three minutes. The engine automatically shuts off and a smaller engine maintains essential systems, lighting and heat/air conditioning as required. This technology was introduced in 2015 and it saves about 75 per cent of the energy typically used to run an idling fire truck. It is useful because upon arriving at an incident, firefighters cannot afford to waste precious time turning off the engine and lights.

=== HAZMAT ===
VFRS's HAZMAT team responds to calls for gas leaks, toxic chemicals, electrical emergencies and carbon monoxide investigations.

=== Fire stations and apparatus ===
Station #	Neighbourhood	Engine company	Aerial company or platform company	Miscellaneous or support units	Address	Build year
7-1	Thornhill	Engine 711	Aerial 716		835 Clark Avenue West	1981
7-2	Maple	Engine Rescue 721		Utility 720; Rescue 729; Platoon Chief 7-4	9290 Keele Street	1966
7-3	Woodbridge	Engine Rescue 731	Platform 737	Haz-Mat 738; District Chief 7-5	7690 Martin Grove Road	2017
7-4	Kleinburg	Engine Rescue 741		Field Support unit Tanker 744	835 Nashville Road	2019
7-5	Woodbridge	Engine Rescue 759 Engine 756 (quint)		Tech Rescue 758	2 Fieldstone Drive	1997
7-6	Concord		Platform 767		120 McCleary Court	1990
7-7	Woodbridge	Engine Rescue 771		Tanker 774	40 Eagleview Heights	2002
7-8	Concord	Engine 786 (quint)		Air/Light 780	111 Racco Parkway	2004
7-9	Woodbridge	Engine 796 (quint)			9601 Islington Avenue	2007
7-10	Maple	Engine 710-1		Command 701	10800 Dufferin Street	2012
Joint Operations Centre (headquarters)	Concord			Mechanical Unit 702; Fire Investigation Unit	2800 Rutherford Road	
Spare apparatus		Engine Unit 7911 (quint); Engine Unit 7967 (quint); Engine Unit 7973 (quint); Engine Unit 7984; Engine Unit 7985; Engine Unit 7986	Aerial Unit 7968	Rescue Unit 7900; Chief SUV (x2)		

Stations

Vaughan Fire Station 7-1 on Clark Avenue West in Thornhill

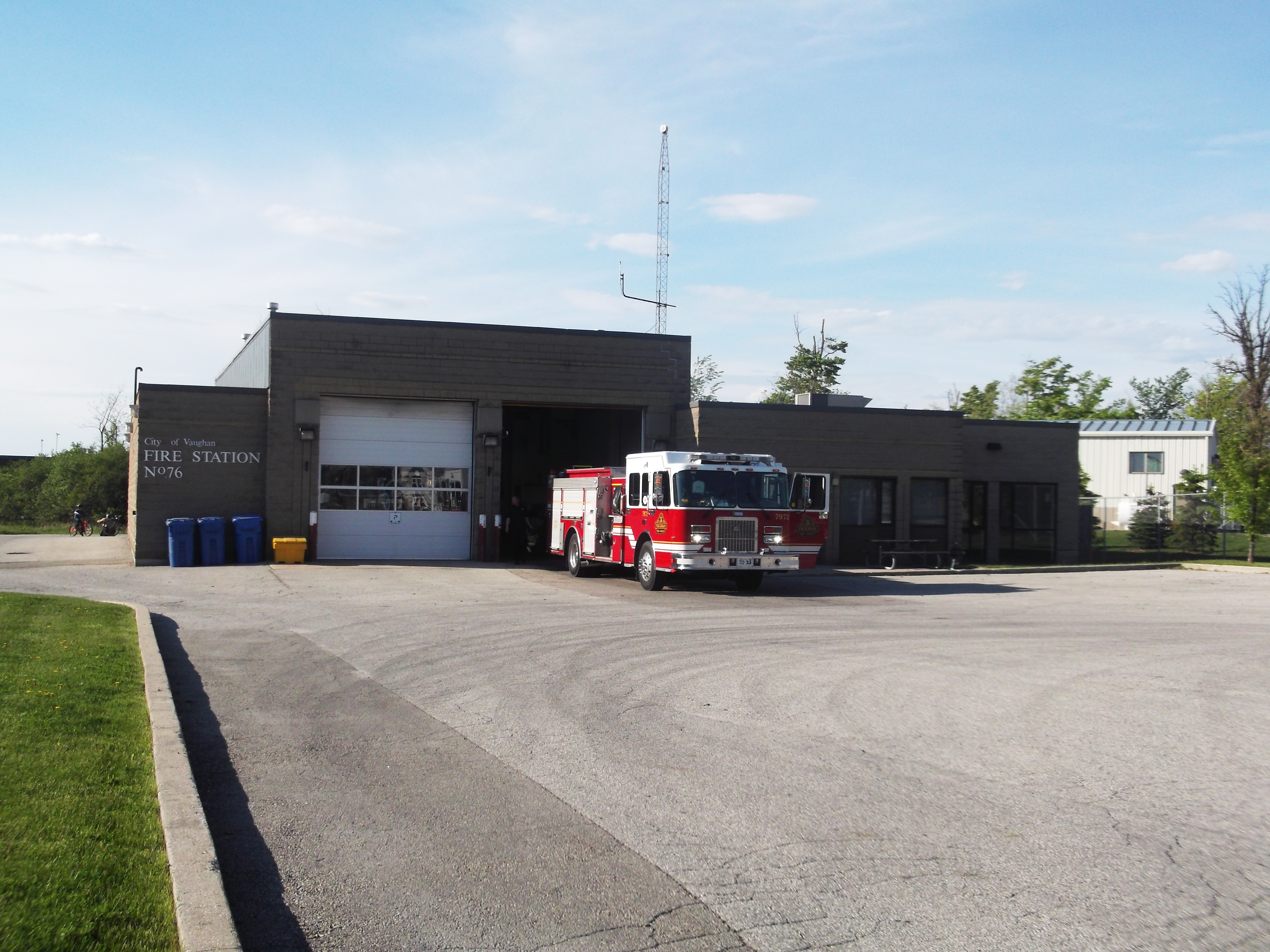
Station 7-6 on McCleary Court in Concord

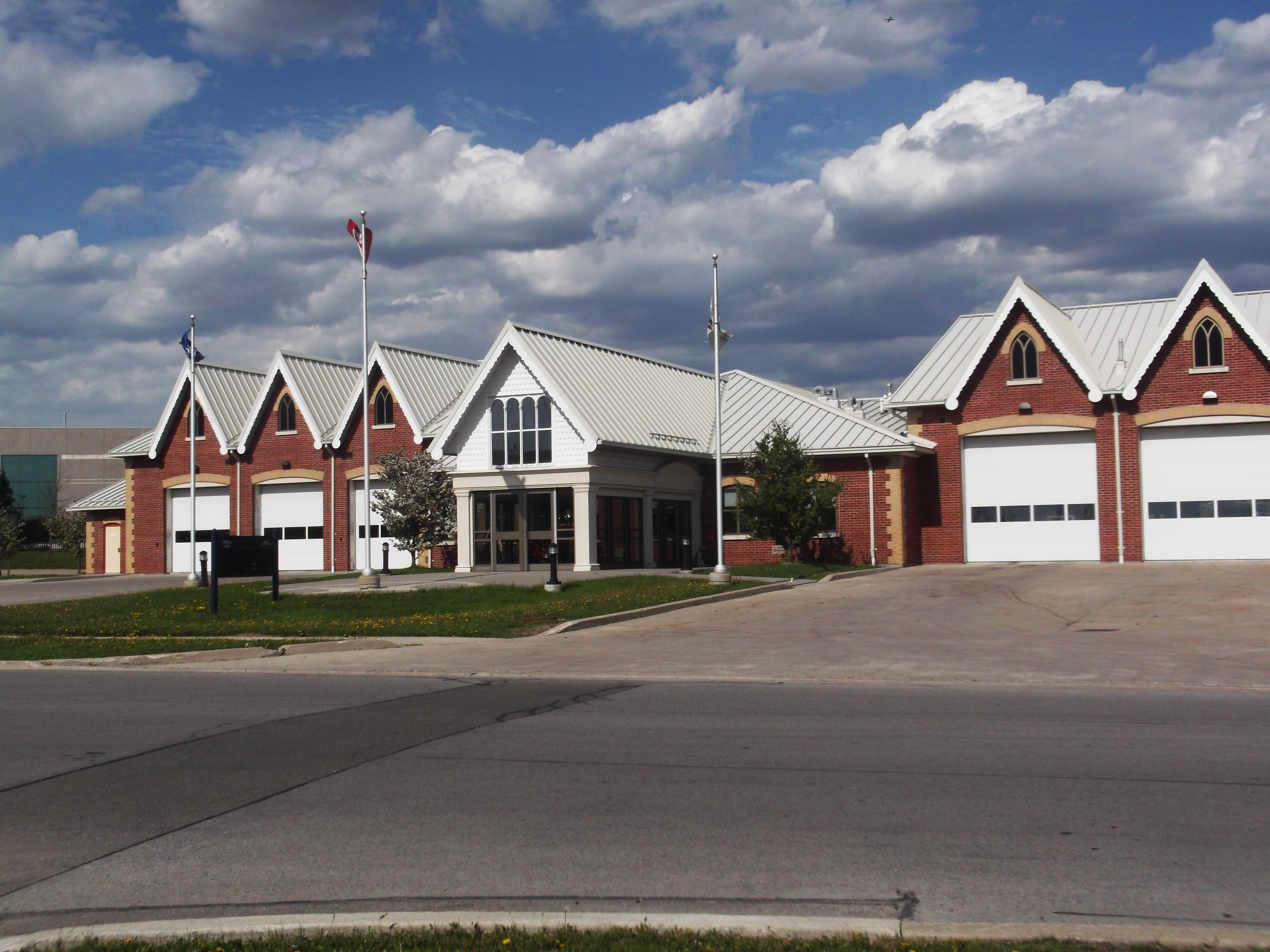
Station 7-8 on Racco Pkwy in Thornhill

Apparatus

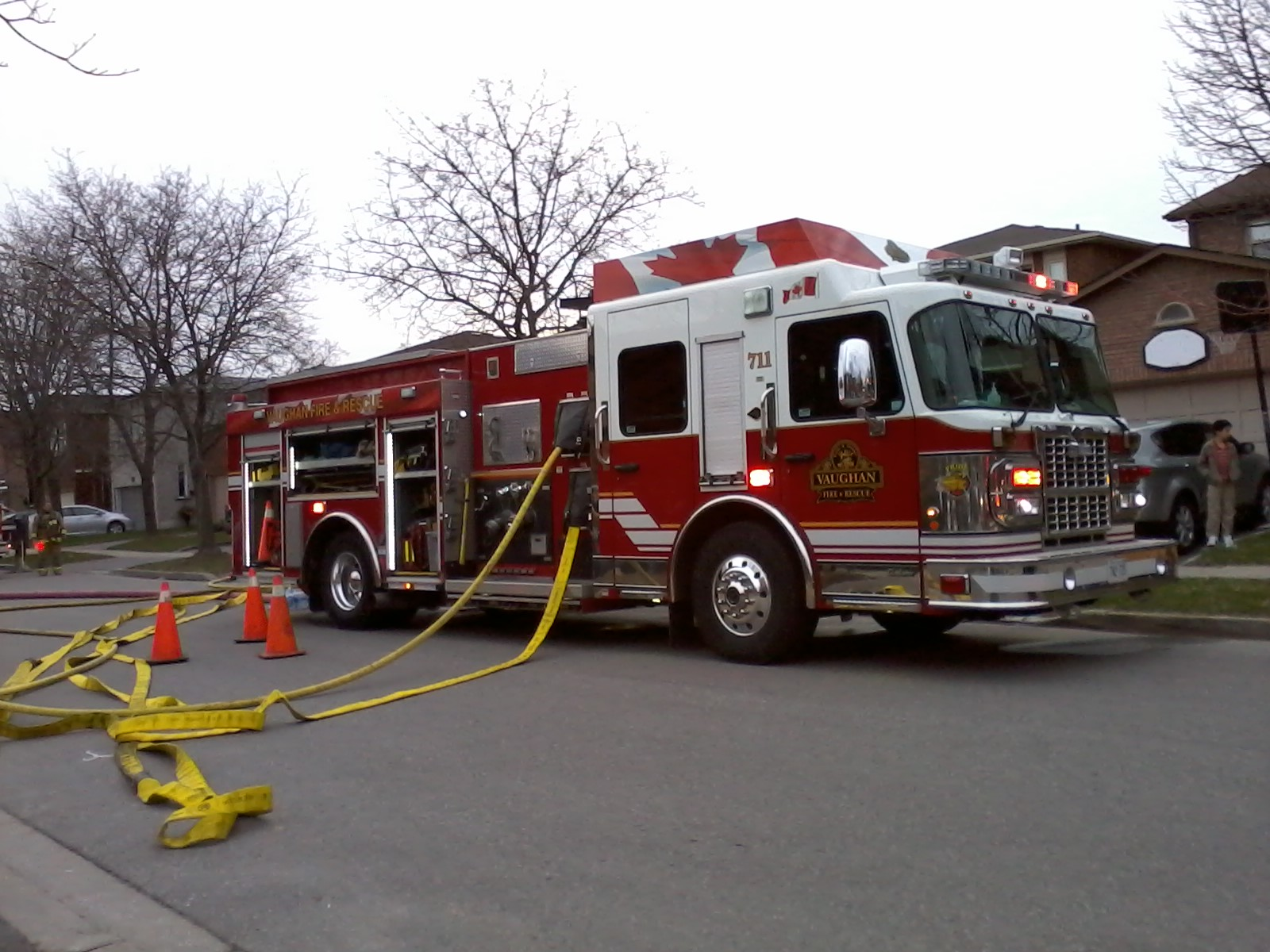
Engine 711

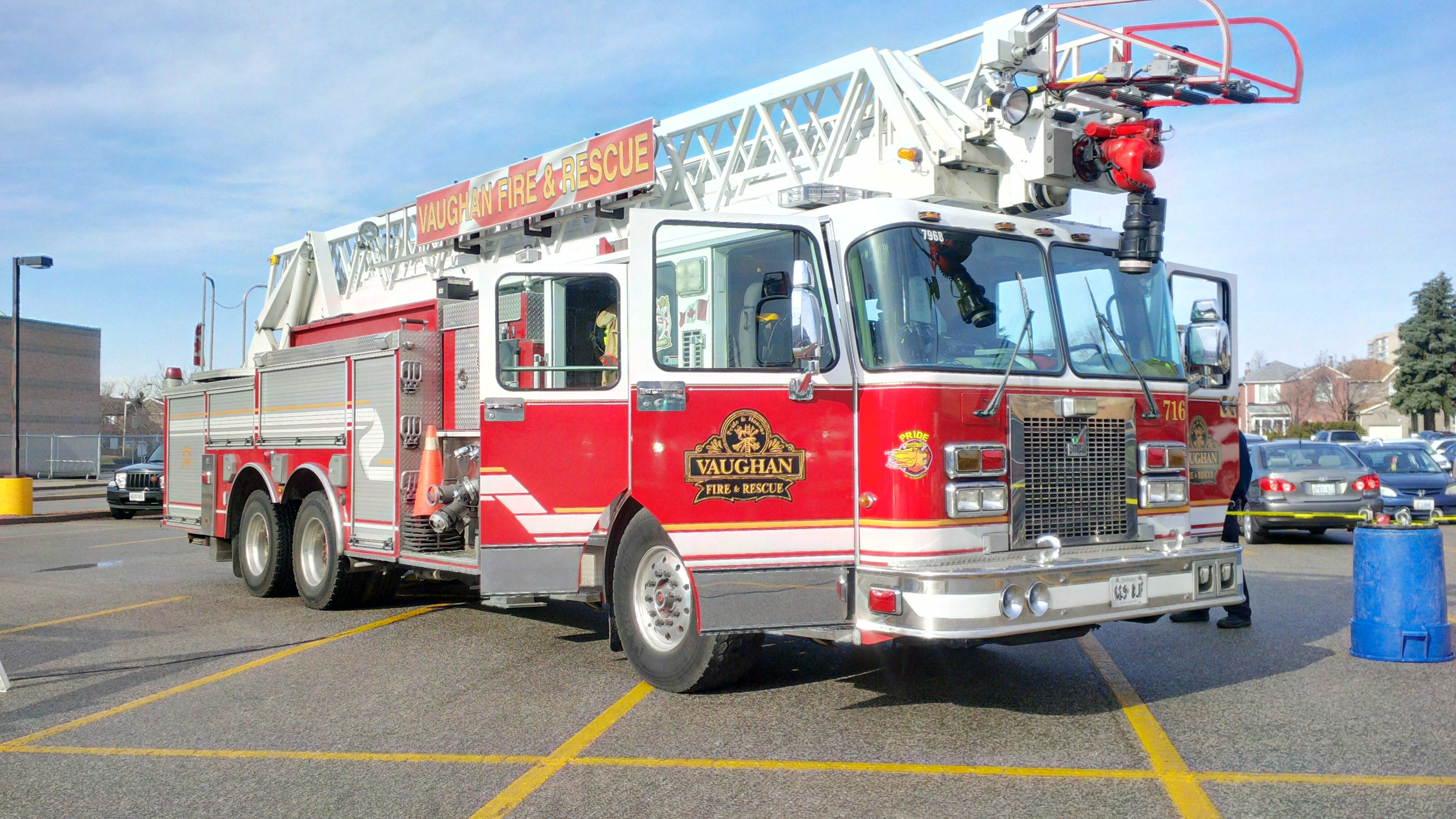
Former Aerial 716

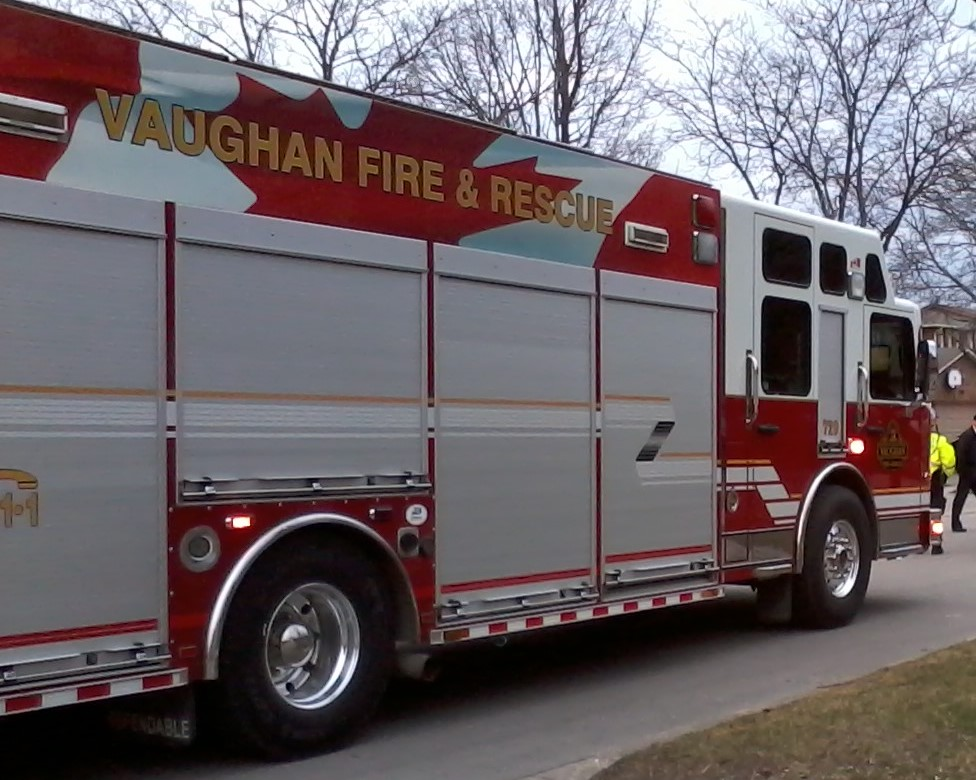
Former Rescue 729

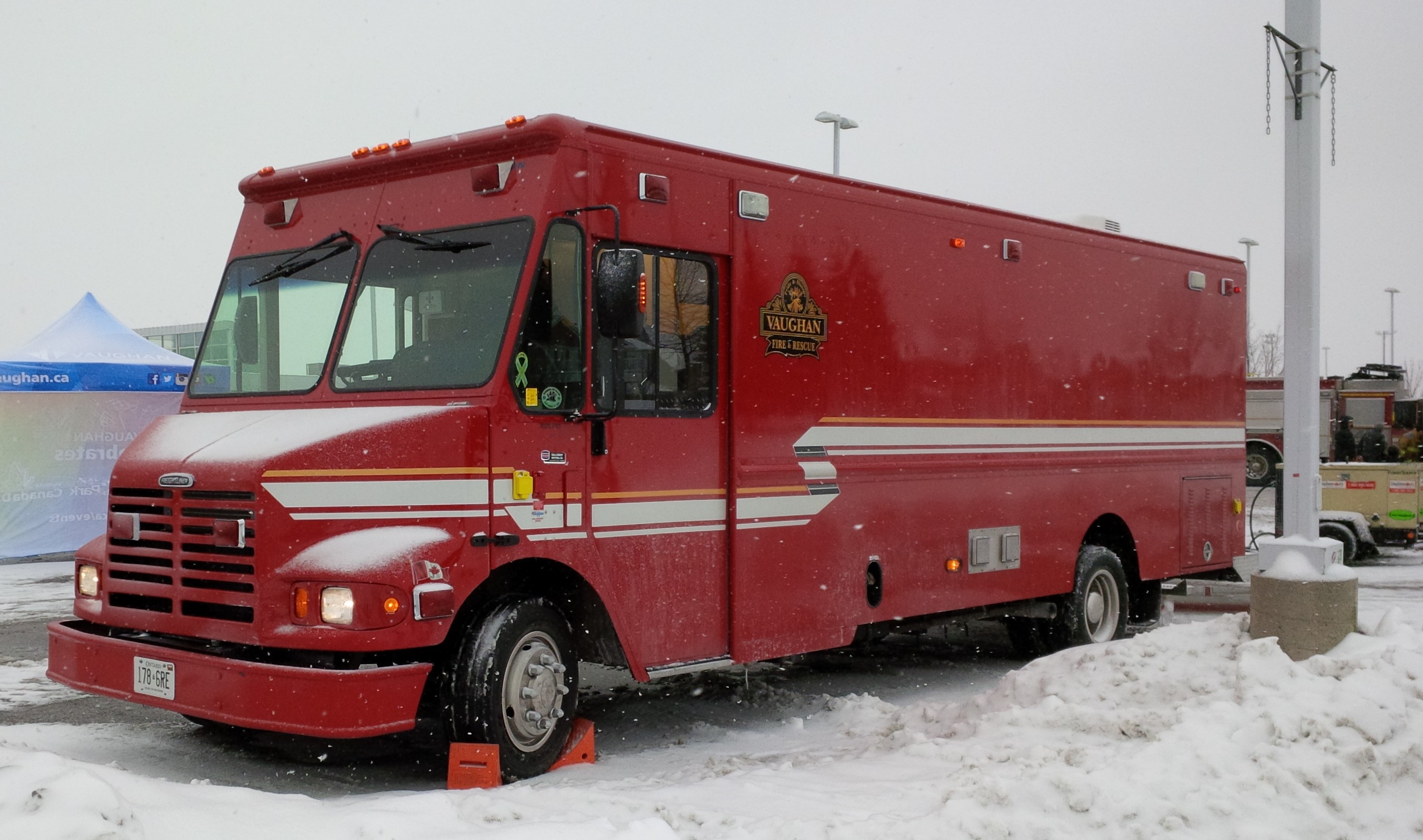
Former Rehab 790

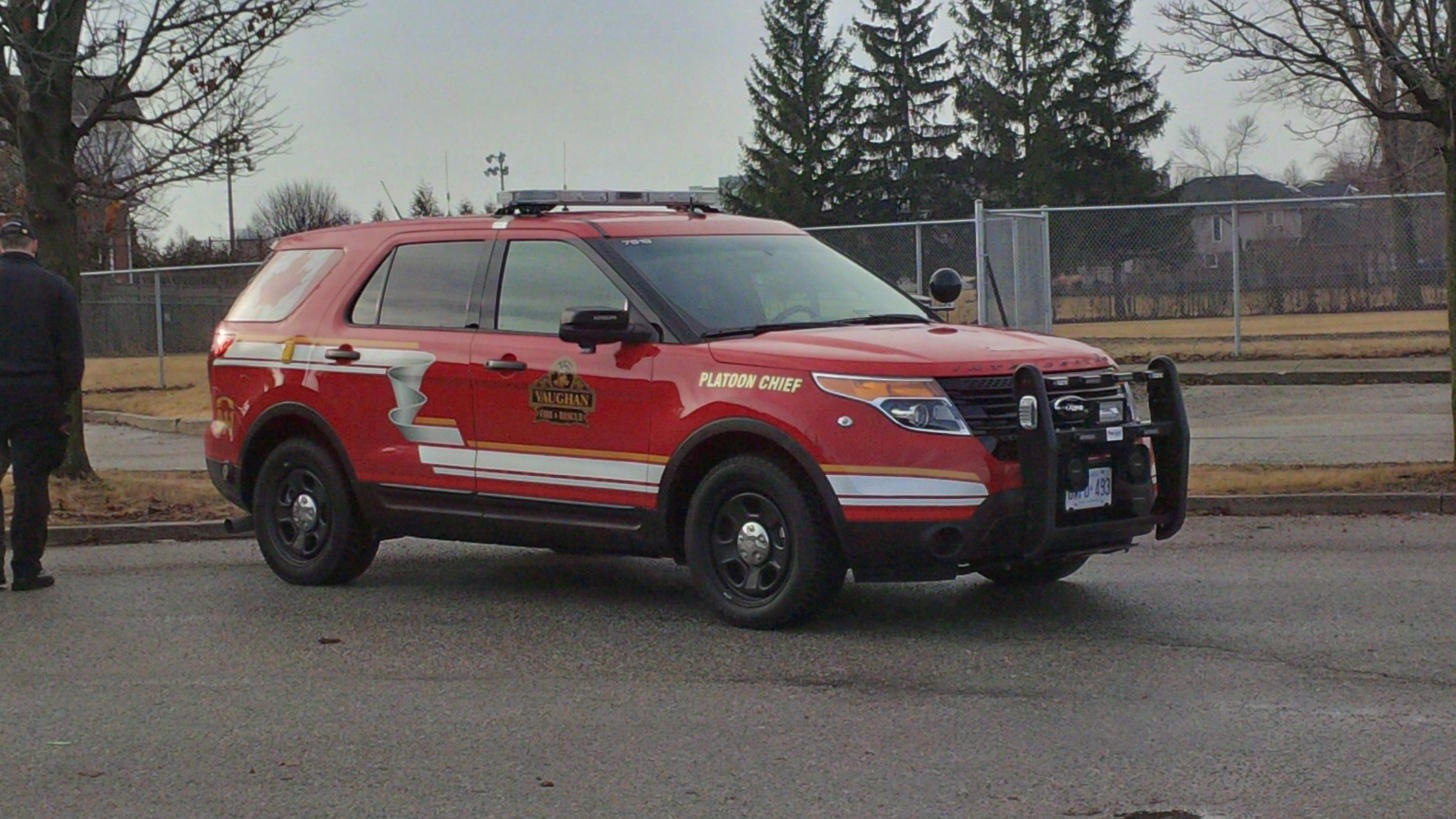
Platoon Chief 7-4

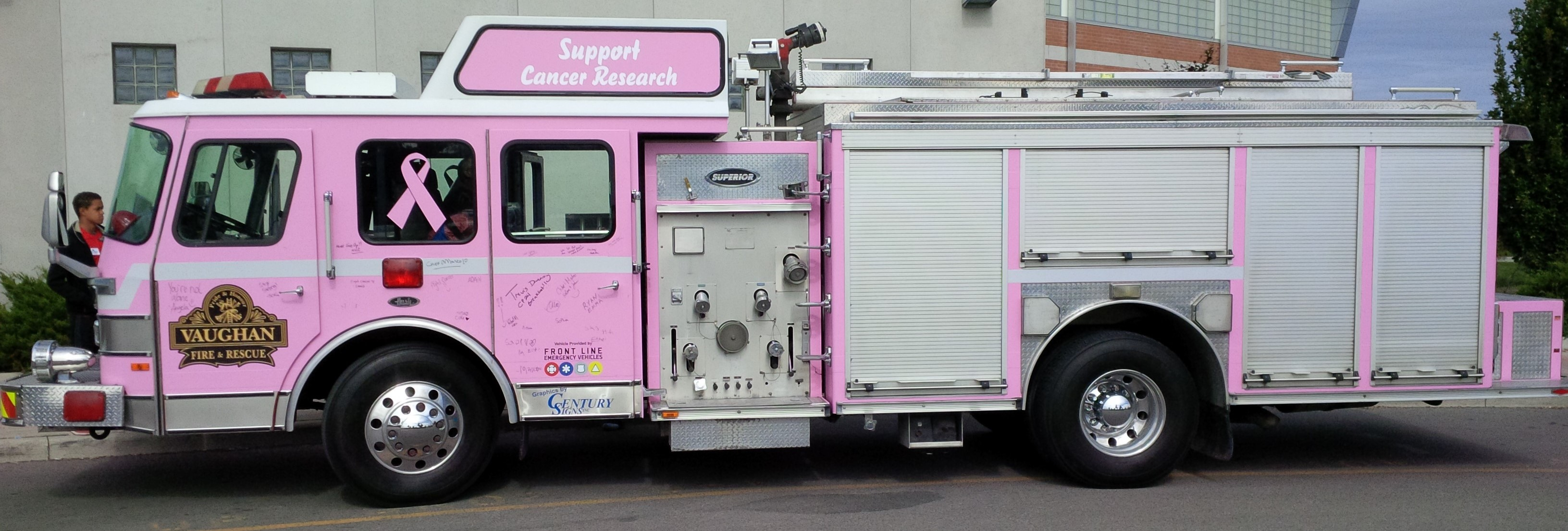
Cancer Awareness rig

== See also ==
- Fire services in York Region
