= York Region Paramedic Services =

Paramedic services in Ontario, Canada

- Established: 2000
- Headquarters: 80 Bales Drive East, East Gwillimbury, Ontario (York Region)
- Jurisdiction: Regional Municipality of York
- Employees: 480 full-time
- BLS or ALS: Both ALS and BLS
- Ambulances: 48 and 27 other support vehicles
- Chief: Chris Spearen
- Medical director: Central East Prehospital Care Program
- Responses: 75,000+
- Website: WebsiteYork Region Paramedic Services

York Region Paramedic Services provides legislated land ambulance services and paramedic care for the local municipalities within York Region. Paramedic Services is a division of the Region's Paramedic and Seniors Service Branch. Prior to 2000, ambulance services were provided by 2 private operators (Beaverton & District Ambulance and Uxbridge - Stouffville Ambulance), York County Hospital, Nobleton Volunteer Ambulance and Ontario's Ministry of Health. The patchwork of service also had York Region dispatched by 3 different Ministry of Health Communication Centres (Aurora and north by Georgian CACC, Stouffville and Markham by Oshawa CACC and the remainder by Mississauga CACC). Georgian CACC now dispatches the whole region on the Ontario Government leased Bell Mobility Fleetnet VHF trunked radio system. There are approximately 480 full-time paramedics serving the region. Paramedic Operations are based in East Gwillimbury, Ontario.

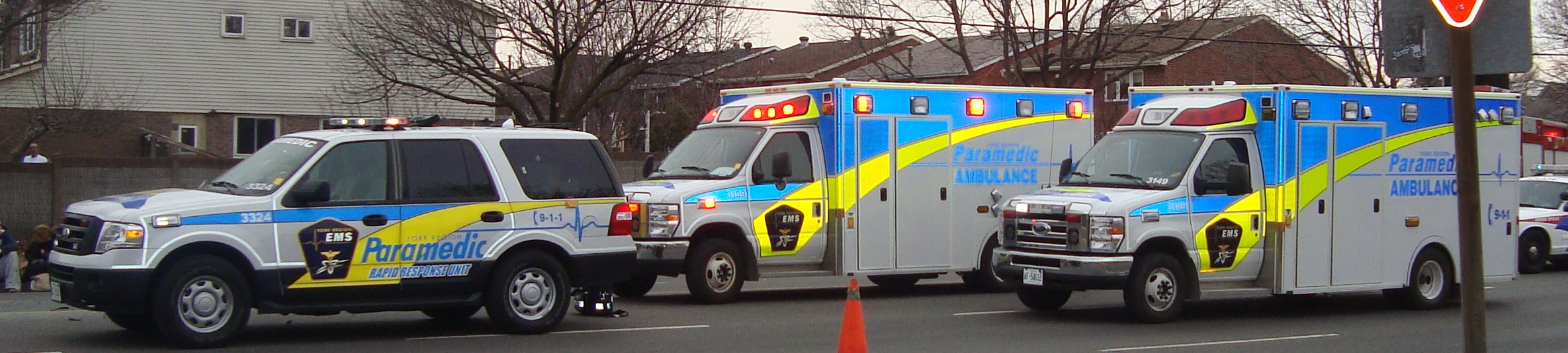
York Region EMS on scene

Stations

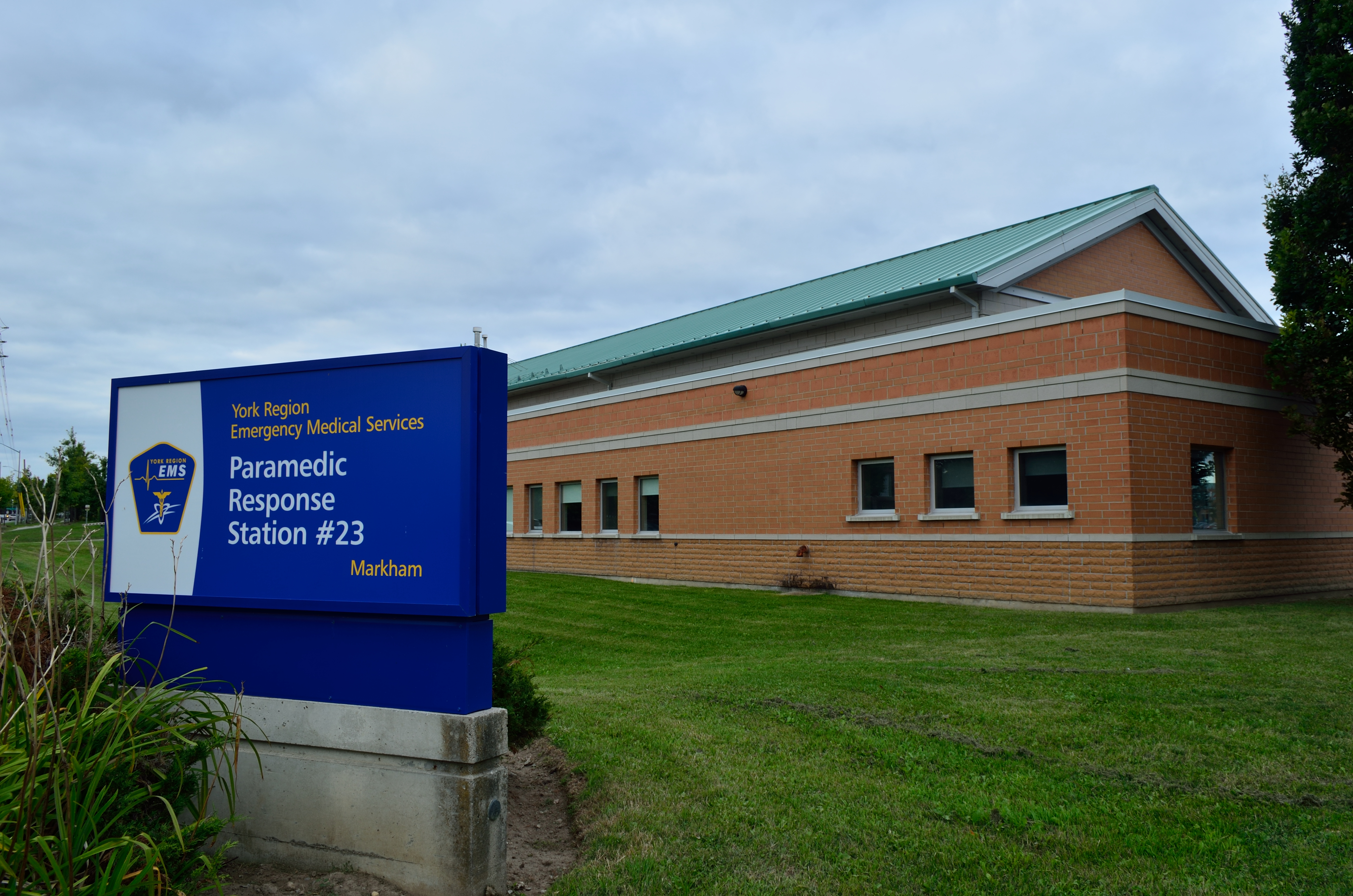
Station 23

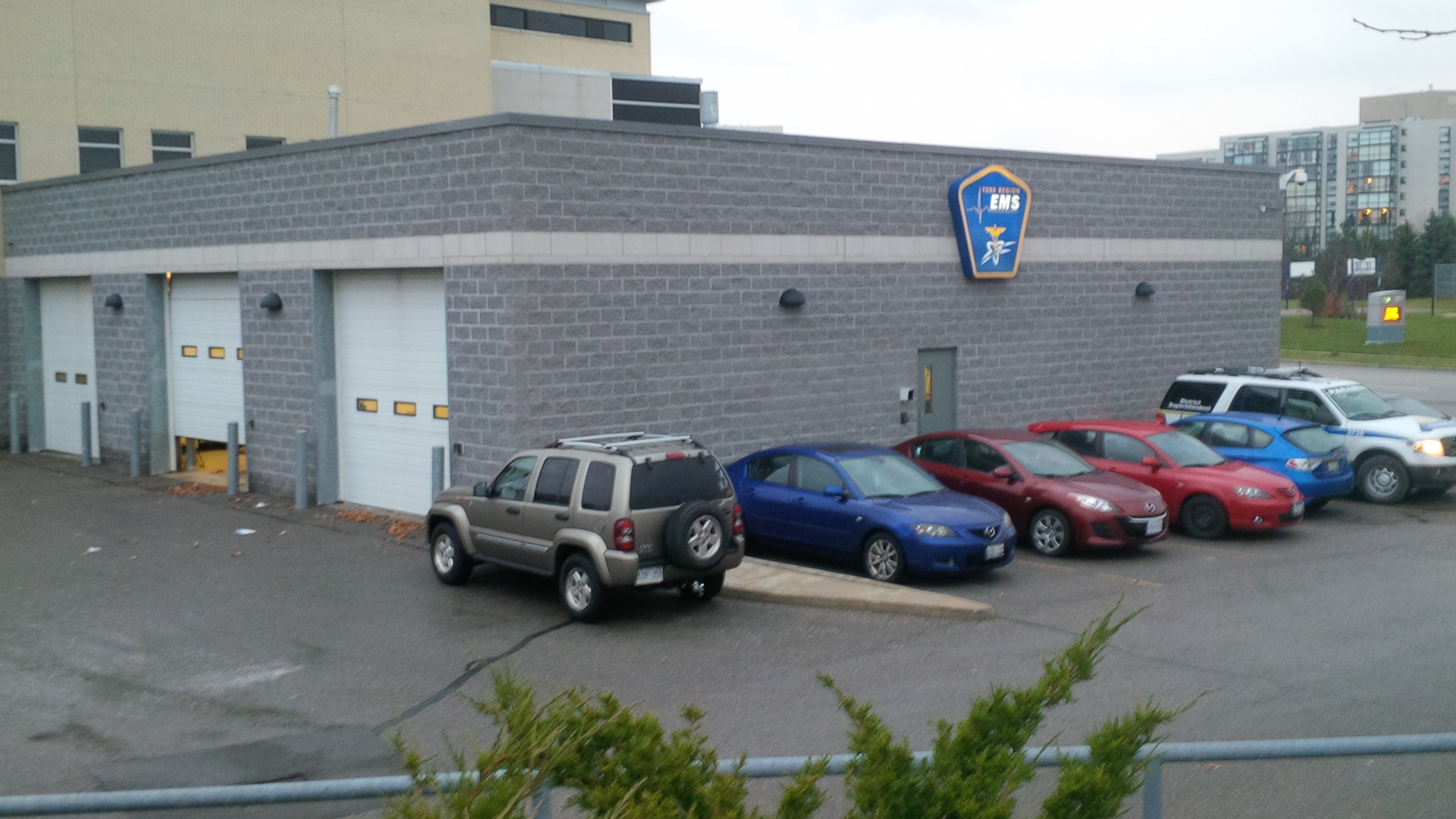
Station 28

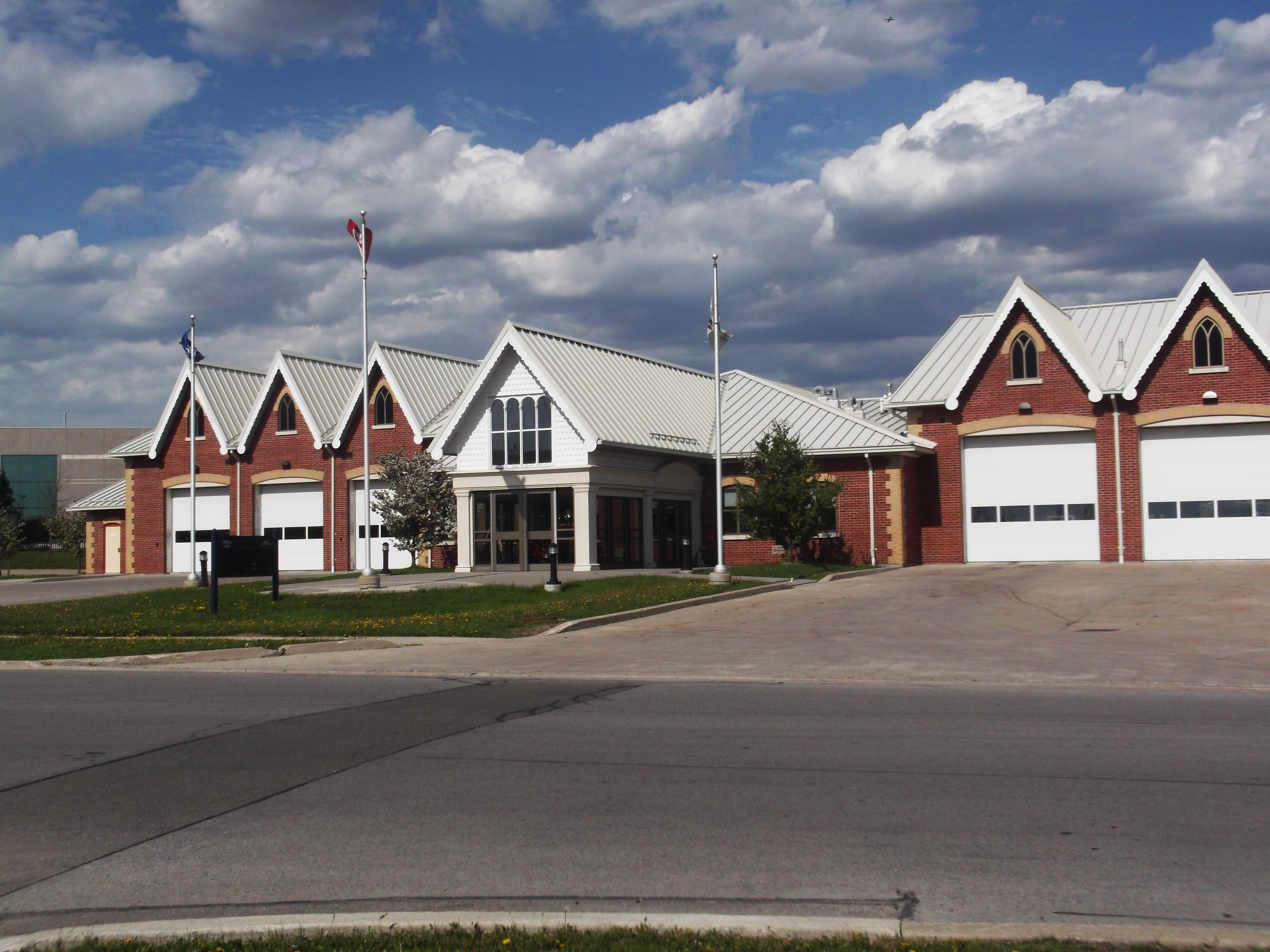
Station 34

Fleet

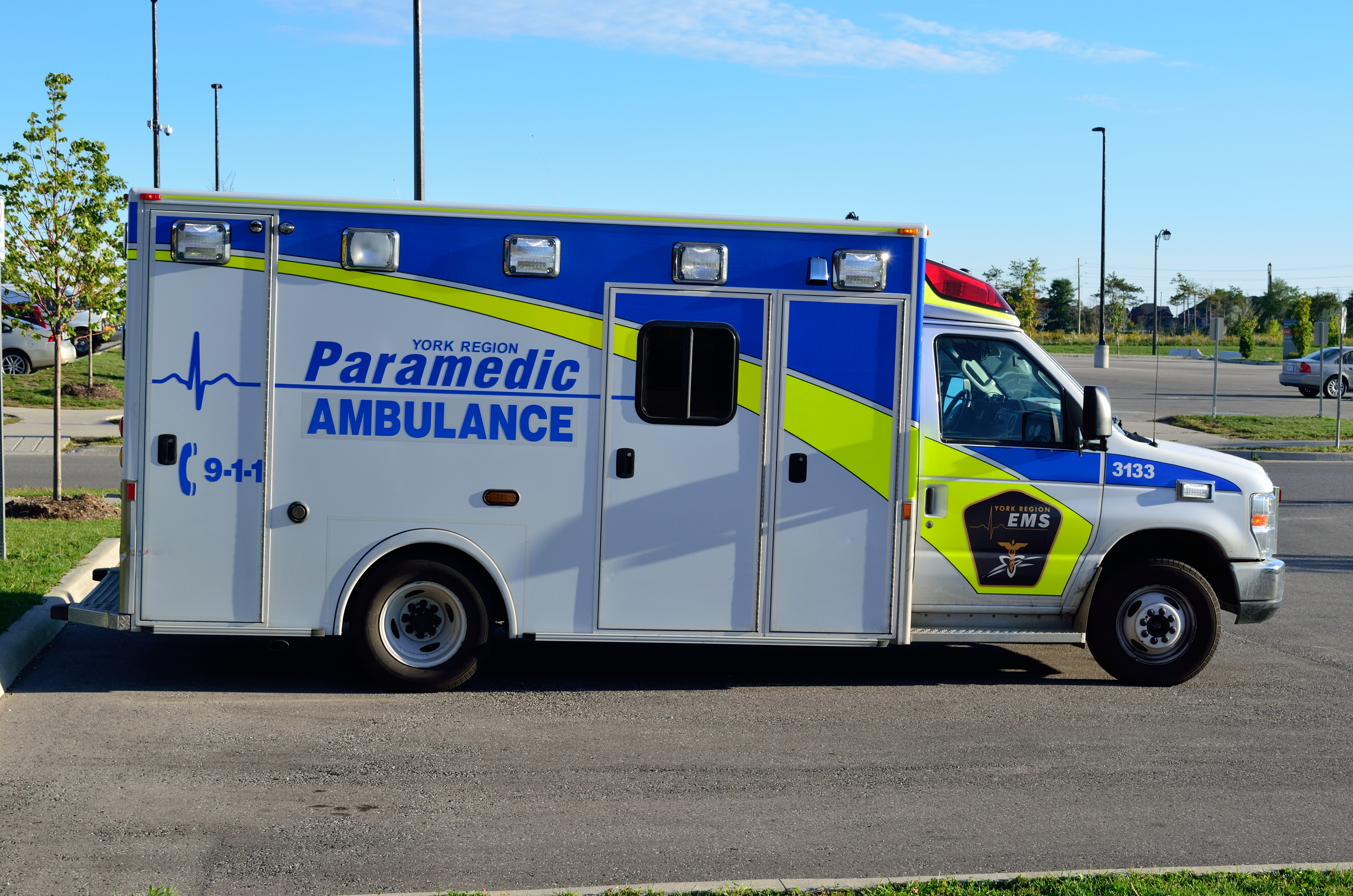
Ambulance

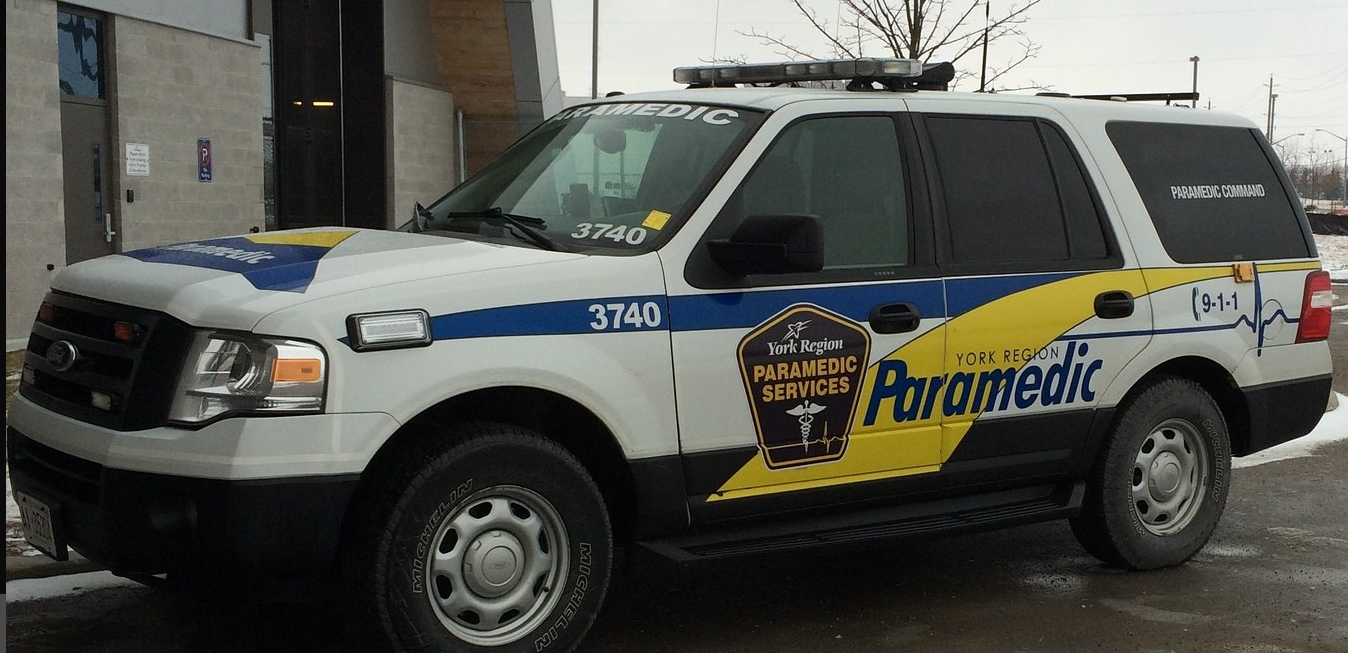
Command

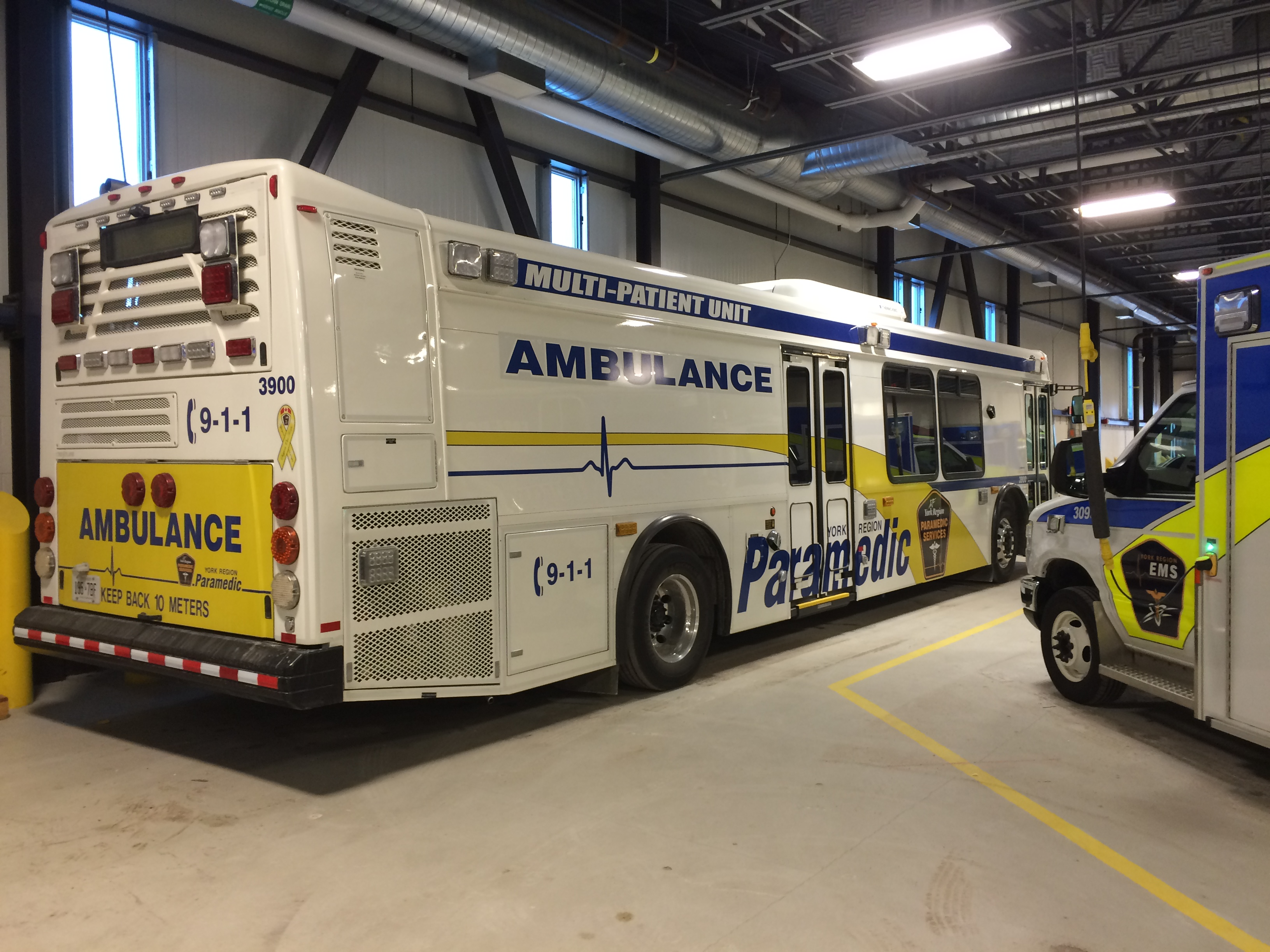
Multi-Patient Transport

== Operations ==
York Region Paramedic Services operates emergency ambulances and Paramedic response units in the 9 local municipalities of the Regional Municipality of York.

Paramedic services on Georgina Island are provided by Georgina Island Fire Department (and boat transfers likely by Georgina Police Service from Fox and Snake Islands). The single ambulance is stationed at the Georgina Fire Department's fire hall on Chief Joseph Snake Road.

District 1

Town of Aurora

- Station 18 - Aurora - 220 Edward Street

Town of Newmarket

- Station 16 - Newmarket NW - Aspenwood
- Station 19 - Newmarket SW - Harry Walker Parkway South

East Gwillimbury

- Station 15 - Mount Albert - 22 Princess Street, Mount Albert, Ontario
- Station 13 - Holland Landing - 2nd Concession Road, East Gwillimbury, Ontario
- Station 99 - York Region Paramedic Services Headquarters 80 Bales Drive East, Sharon, Ontario

Town of Georgina

- Station 12 - Keswick - 160 Morton Ave, Keswick, Ontario
- Station 10 - Pefferlaw - 16 Hastings Road, Pefferlaw, Ontario
- Station 11 - Sutton - 21001 Dalton Road, Sutton, Ontario

District 2

- Station 23 - Markham - Church - 280 Church Street, Markham, Ontario
- Station 24 - Unionville - 316 Main Street, Unionville, Ontario
- Station 25 - Markham SE - 14th Avenue and Middlefield Road
- Station 26 - Markham - Riviera - 10 Riviera Drive
- Station 27 - Markham - 180 Cachet Woods Court
- Station 29 - Markham - 107 Glen Cameron Rd

Town of Whitchurch-Stouffville

- Station 21 - Stouffville - 100 Weldon Road
- Station 20 - Ballantrae - 15400 Highway 48, Ballantrae, Ontario
- Station 22 - Gormley - 12388 Woodbine Ave

Town of Richmond Hill

- Station 28 - Richmond Hill - 171 Major MacKenzie Drive West (York Regional Road 25)
- Station 85 - Richmond Hill - 150 High Tech Road

District 3

City of Vaughan

- Station 31 - 7690 Martin Grove Rd, Vaughan, Ontario
- Station 30 - Woodbridge - 9601 Islington Avenue (York Regional Road 17), Woodbridge, Ontario
- Station 34 - Racco Pkwy - 111 Racco Parkway, Vaughan, ON
- Station 32 - Maple - 9290 Keele Street (York Regional Road 72), Maple, Ontario

Township of King

- Station 38 - Schomberg - 15 Dillane Drive, Schomberg, Ontario
- Station 37 - Nobleton - 1 Old King Road, Nobleton, Ontario
- Station 39 - King City- 12825 Keele Street (York Regional Road 72), King City, Ontario

== Fleet ==
- 62 Ambulances - Type III ambulance - Demers Mystere ( 30XX, 31XX, 32XX, 34XX)
- 9 Rapid Response Units (33XX)
- 5 District Superintendent Units (37XX)
  - Ford Expedition and Ford Explorer Interceptor
- 3 Supply Vehicles
- 4 Administrative Vehicles (Supervisor) - unnumbered
- 2 Driver Training Vehicles
- 1 Community Programs Vehicle (CP01)
- 1 Emergency Support Unit Trailer (TR01)
- 1 Rehab and Decon Trailer
- 1 Emergency Support Unit Cargo Truck
- 1 Emergency Support Unit and Command Unit (3650)
- 1 Multi-patient transport unit - Crestline ElDorado National 40' Axess (3900)
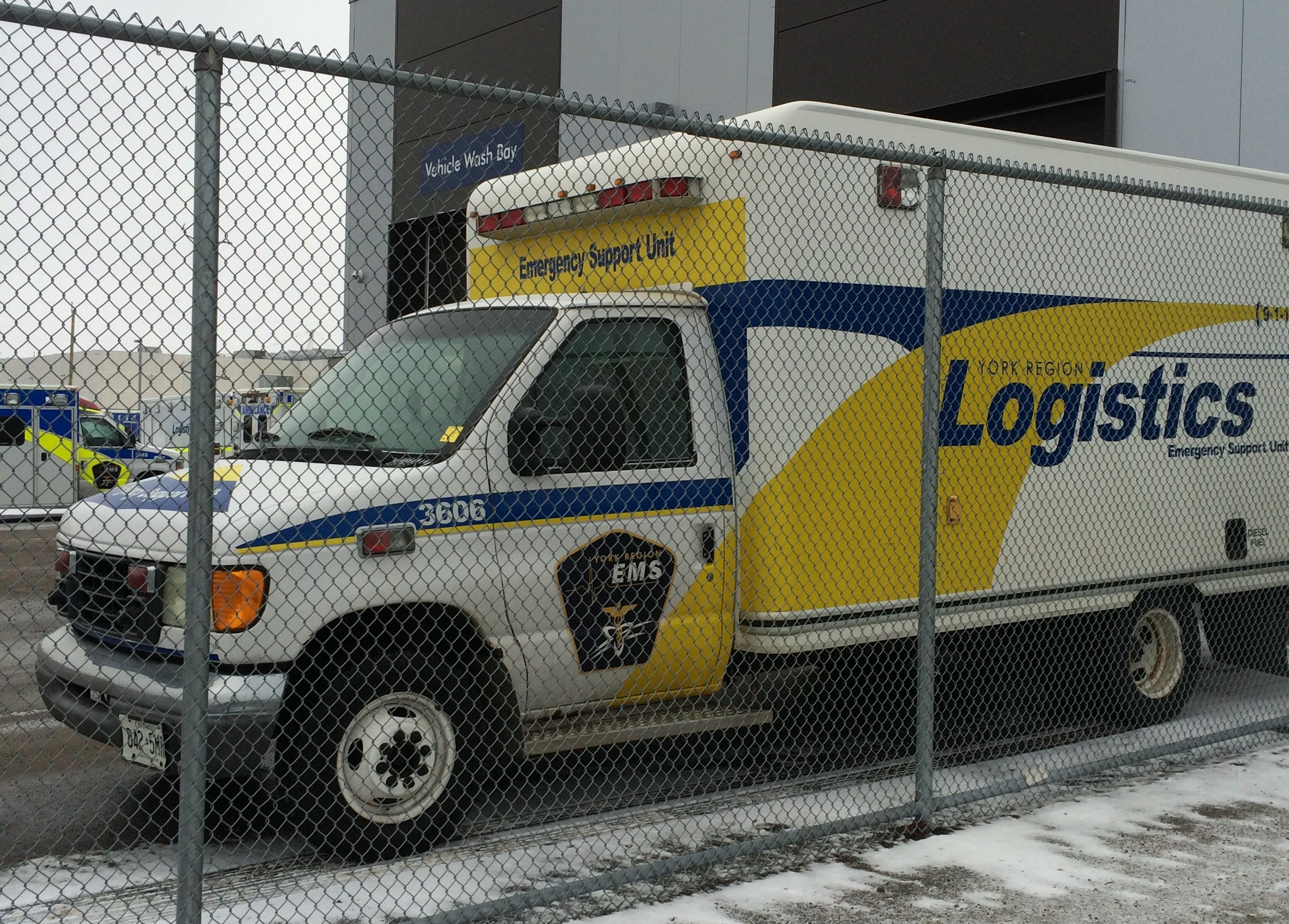
  Logistics Support
- 4 Special Response Units (Individual Paramedic, Pick-up chassis vehicle) - (36XX)
- 1 Off-road Ranger Ambulance
- 3 Inflatable mobile hospital/treatment tents (2 - 25' round and 1 - 42'x22')

== Services ==
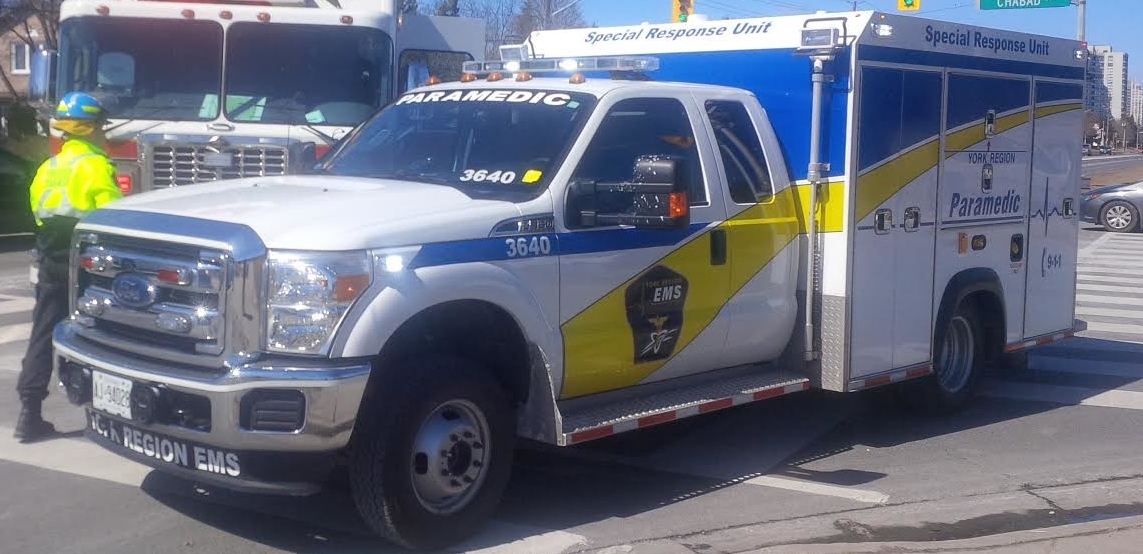
Special Response Unit

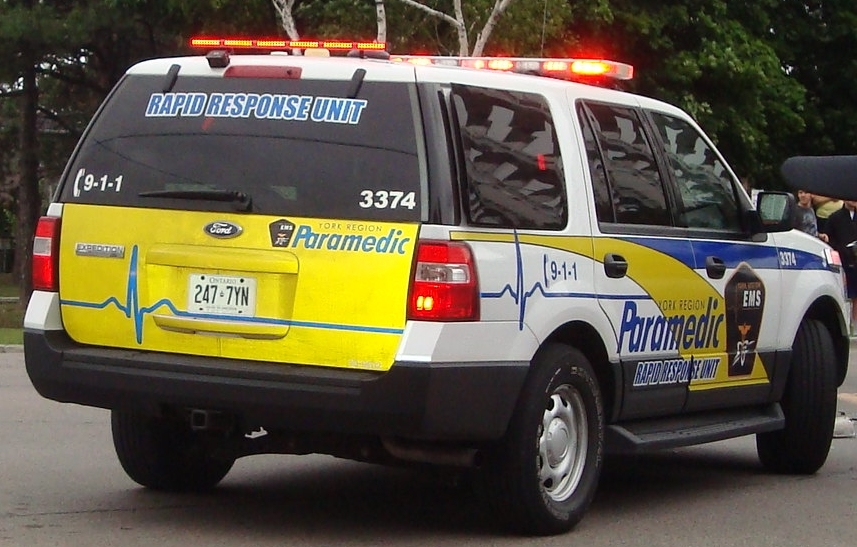
Rapid Response Unit

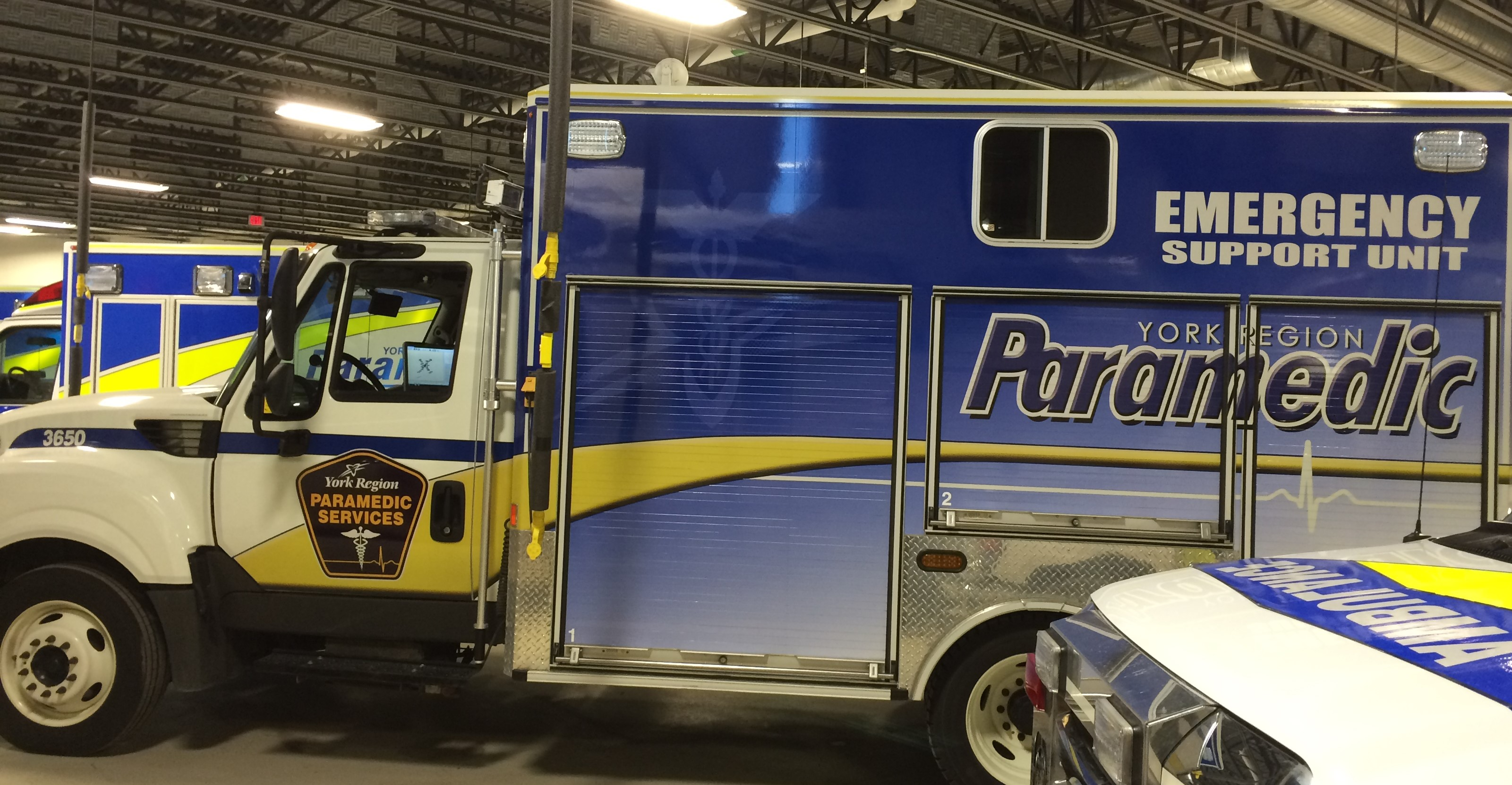
Emergency Support

- Primary Care Paramedics
- Advanced Care Paramedics
- Special Response Unit Medics - Bariatric Patient Transport, Tactical, CBRN, Incident Command, Marine
- Community Event Services - Bike Unit, Special Event Paramedic Standbys
- Heart Alive - Public Access Defibrillation (PAD) program
- Community Programs - Public education and safety promotion
- Research and Clinical Programs
- Community Paramedicine - "EPIC" research trial in association with Health for All and Markham Family Health Team and St Michael's Hospital
- Performance and Development - Paramedic recruitment, in-house training, Advanced Care Paramedic training
- Professional Standards - Patient inquiries, health record inquiries
- Patient Advocacy Unit in the Office of the Chief

== See also ==
Paramedicine in Canada

- List of EMS Services in Ontario
- Paramedics in Canada
- Emergency Medical Services in Canada

Emergency Services in York Region

- York Regional Police
- Fire Services in York Region
- Vaughan Fire and Rescue Services
