= Middlesex-London EMS =

Middlesex-London Paramedic Service
- Headquarters: London, Ontario
- Jurisdiction: Middlesex County, Ontario
- Employees: 400+
- BLS or ALS: Both
- Ambulances: 56+
- Responses: approx. 110,000/yr (2022)
- Website: Middlesex-London Paramedic Service

Middlesex-London Paramedic Service is the statutory Emergency medical services provider for Middlesex County, and London, Ontario. The service provides Paramedic Services to the City of London, and the Townships of Adelaide Metcalfe, Lucan Biddulph, Middlesex Centre, North Middlesex, Southwest Middlesex, Strathroy-Caradoc, Thames Centre, Newbury. Middlesex London Paramedic Service delivers ambulance service to Middlesex and London in accordance with service and patient care standards set by the County of Middlesex, City of London, and Ministry of Health and Long Term Care. Medical oversight for controlled medical acts is provided under the direction of the Southwestern Ontario Regional Base Hospital Program.

The service is operated directly as a branch of the municipal government as an independent, third-service option provider, which means that the service is funded by the municipal tax base, and operates in much the same manner as any other municipal department, such as the police or fire department, or in some cases like a public utility, but retains its complete independence from all other departments. While under municipal government control, it is required to comply with legislation and licensing standards provided by the Ontario provincial government. Middlesex-London Paramedic Service is the only emergency medical service provider in Middlesex County, private-for-profit medical transport services also provide routine, non-emergency transports and coverage for special events, but the statutory EMS system is the only provider permitted to service emergency calls.

== Staff ==
Middlesex-London Paramedic Service employs 400+ Primary and Advanced Care Paramedics, Logistics Technicians and Support Staff.

== Fleet ==
- 80+ vehicles including:
  - 56 Ambulances;
  - 6 Operations Superintendent Command Units;
  - 6 Admin Vehicles;
  - 4 Paramedic Response Units;
  - 4 Community Paramedicine Vehicles;
  - 3 Logistics & Support Vehicles;
  - 2 Pediatric/Neonatal Transport Team Ambulances;
  - 1 Off-Road Gator;
  - 1 Emergency Support Unit Bus.

== Operations ==
Service is provided to a residential population of approximately 500,000 people, in the nine local townships of Middlesex County.

Middlesex-London Paramedic Service operates a total of 13 dedicated Paramedic response stations, geographically distributed across the 1,447 square miles (3,700 km^{2}) of the Middlesex County, as well as their headquarters, where some ambulances are deployed from and assigned to other stations across the city. Emergency service headquarters is located at 1035 Adelaide Street South in London. Air ambulance operations are provided within the City of London by Ornge, a privately owned air ambulance contractor, under contract to the Government of Ontario.

District 1

City of London

- Headquarters - 1035 Adelaide St South, London, Ontario
- Station 0 - 1035 Adelaide St South, London, Ontario
- Station 1 - 340 Waterloo St, London, Ontario
- Station 4 - Trossacks - 1601 Trossacks Ave, London, Ontario
- Station 13 - Byron - 3100 Colonel Talbot Rd, London, Ontario
- Station 14 - Hyde Park - 2225 Hyde Park Rd, London, Ontario
- Station 16 - Horizon - 745 Horizon Drive, London, Ontario
- Station 18 - Dorchester - 2168 Dorchester Road, Thames Centre, Ontario
- Station 20 - Trafalgar - 2330 Trafalgar Street, London, Ontario

District 2

Southwest Middlesex

- Station 6 - Glencoe - 147 McKellar Street, Glencoe, Ontario

North Middlesex

- Station 8 - Parkhill - 194 Park Hill Main St, Parkhill, Ontario

Lucan Biddulph

- Station 9 - Lucan - 188 George St, Lucan, Ontario

Middlesex Centre

- Station 12- Komoka - 22494 Komoka Rd, Komoka, Ontario

Strathroy-Caradoc

- Station 17 - Strathroy - 351 Frances St, Strathroy, Ontario

== See also ==
=== Paramedicine in Canada ===
- List of EMS Services in Ontario
- Paramedics in Canada
- Emergency Medical Services in Canada
