= Halton Region Paramedic Services =

- Established: August 2000
- Headquarters: Oakville, Ontario
- Jurisdiction: Regional
- Employees: ~280 Full-time and part-time
- BLS or ALS: Both
- Stations: 15
- Ambulances: 23
- Chief: Greg Sage (Chief), Christine Barber (Deputy Chief, Logistics), Peter McMurrough (Deputy Chief, PDQI), Tom Stirling (Deputy Chief, Operations)
- Medical director: Dr. Sheldon Cheskes
- Responses: ~50 000
- Website: Halton Region Paramedic Services

Halton Region Paramedic Services provides emergency medical services to the municipalities of Halton Region:

- Burlington
- Oakville
- Milton
- Halton Hills

Halton Region Paramedic Services has approximately 280 Paramedics and 15 Paramedic stations throughout The Region. The service began in 2000 and replaced two different contractors to the Ontario Ministry of Health.

== Fleet Staffing ==
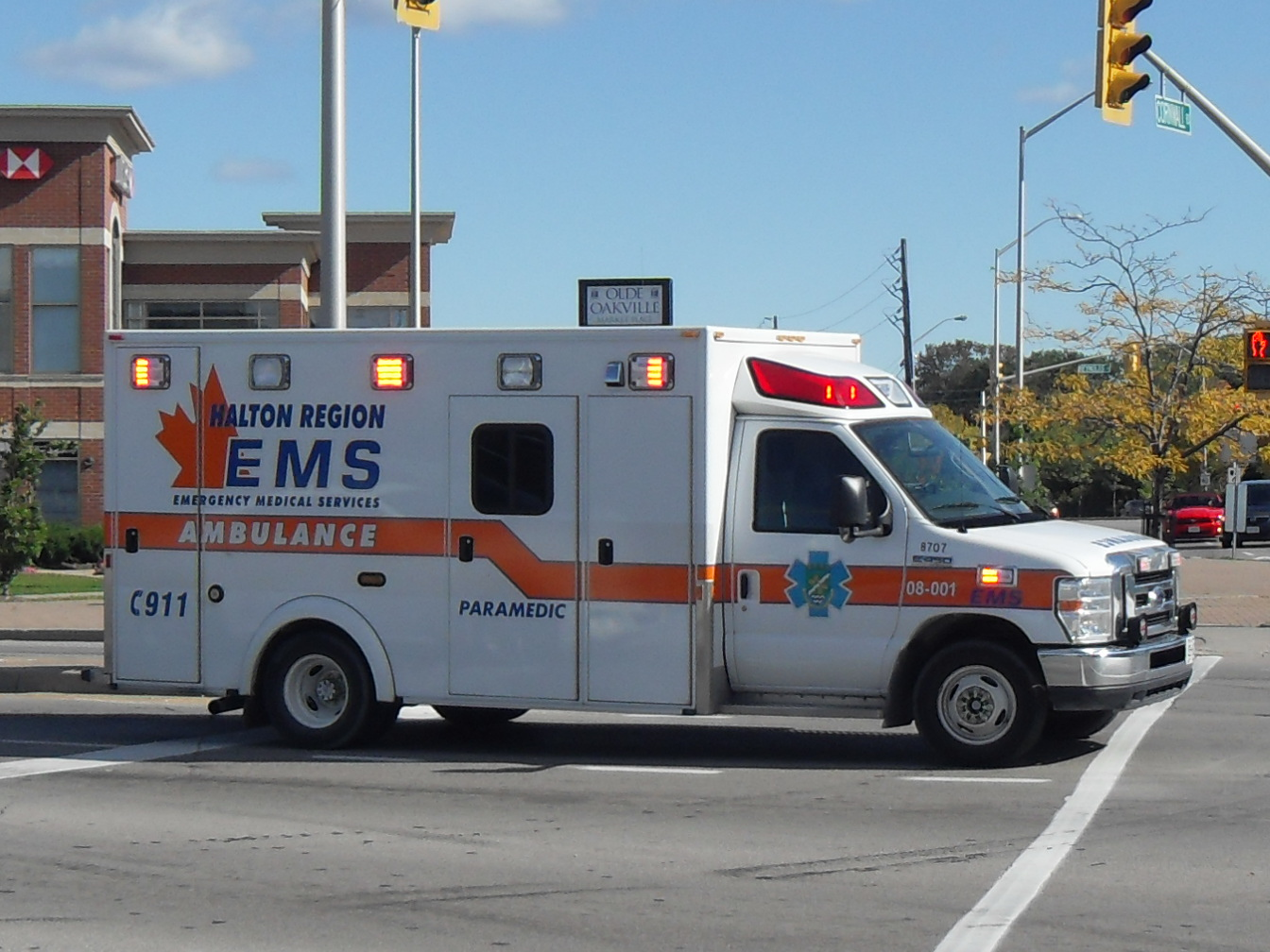
A Halton Region ambulance responding to a call

- 23 Ambulances during the daytime and 14 overnight.
- 4 First Response Units during the daytime
- 1 Emergency Support Unit, on call

== Stations ==
=== Oakville, Ontario ===
- 1179 Bronte Road (00 Station - Headquarters)
- 1080 Cornwall Road (12 Station)
- 139 Georgian Drive (02 Station)
- 3019 Pine Glen Road (14 Station - Tactical Base)
- 289 Woodside Dr (15 Station)

=== Burlington, Ontario ===
- 455 Cumberland Avenue (03 Station)
- 1018 Willowbrook Road (04 Station)
- 2130 Brant Street (05 Station)
- 5200 Corporate Drive (10 Station)

=== Milton, Ontario ===
- 2665 Reid Side Road, Campbellville (06 Station)
- 492 Childs Drive, Milton (07 Station)
- 7825 Louis St Laurent Ave, Milton (17 Station)
- 6650 Fifth Line, Milton (16 Station)

=== Halton Hills, Ontario ===
- 53 Maple Avenue, Georgetown, Ontario (13 Station)
- 39 Churchill Road South, Acton (08 Station)

== Special programs ==
- Honour Guard
- First Response Units
- Tactical Paramedic Team
- Community Paramedics
- Bike Paramedic Team
- Preceptorship (ACP and PCP)
- Prehospital Research / Clinical Trials - PITSTOP (Sepsis), DOSE-VF (Cardiac Arrest)

Regional Bypass Programs:

- STEMI - Trillium Health Partners, Mississauga; Hamilton General Hospital, Hamilton
- Stroke - Trillium Health Partners, Mississauga; Joseph Brant Hospital, Burlington
- Trauma
  - Adult:
    - St. Michael's Hospital, Toronto
    - Sunnybrook Health Sciences Centre, Toronto
    - Hamilton General Hospital, Hamilton
  - Children:
    - McMaster Children's Hospital, Hamilton
    - The Hospital for Sick Children (Sick Kids), Toronto

== Historic Emergency Calls in Halton Region involving Halton Paramedics ==
- February 26, 2012 - Burlington VIA train derailment

== See also ==
Paramedicine in Canada

- List of EMS Services in Ontario
- Paramedics in Canada
- Emergency Medical Services in Canada

Emergency Services in Halton Region

- Halton Regional Police
