= Region of Waterloo Paramedic Service =

Region of Waterloo Paramedic Services
- Motto: Excellence in Patient Care
- Headquarters: Cambridge, Ontario
- Jurisdiction: Regional Municipality of Waterloo
- Employees: Approx. 350+
- Chief: John Riches
- Responses: Approx. 63,000/yr (2021)
- Website: Region of Waterloo Paramedic Services

Region of Waterloo Paramedic Services (ROWPS) is the emergency medical service provider for the Regional Municipality of Waterloo. The service provides both advanced and primary care level paramedic services to the cities of Waterloo, Ontario, Cambridge, Ontario and Kitchener, Ontario and the townships of Wilmot, Woolwich, Wellesley and North Dumfries.

== Staff ==
Region of Waterloo Paramedic Services employs over 350 primary and advanced care paramedics and support staff.

== Fleet ==
- Ambulances/vehicles including:
  - 55 Ambulances
  - 5 Supervisor Emergency Response Vehicles (ERVs)
  - 4 First response emergency response units (ERUs)
  - 1 Operations Support - Multi-Casualty Incident (MCI) Truck with a trailered UTV for off-road/multi-terrain response
  - 5 Community Paramedic Vehicles
  - 2 Logistics and Support Vehicles
  - 2 MCI Trailers
  - 5 Administrative Support Vehicles

== Operations ==
ROWPS operates from 13 stations within the Region and serves a population of approximately 700,000. ROWPS also provides service to neighbouring areas (such as Oxford, Perth, Wellington and Brant Counties) when ambulances in those municipalities are not available to respond.

- Headquarters – 120 Maple Grove Road, Cambridge (0 Base)
- Breslau – 51 Beacon Point ct. (Station 12)
- Cambridge South – 91 St. Andrews Street (Station 4)
- Cambridge North – Pinebush Road (Station 5)
- Kitchener Downtown – 100 Water Street North (Station 8)
- Kitchener East – 1035 Ottawa Street North (Station 7)
- Kitchener West – 1700 Queens Boulevard (Station 3)
- Kitchener South – Conestoga College Campus, Conestoga College Boulevard (Station 9)
- North Dumfries Township (Ayr) – 501 Scott Street (Station 11)
- Waterloo – 90 Westmount Road (Station 2)
- Waterloo – 1001 Erb's Rd (Station 14)
- Wilmot Township (Philipsburg) – 2001 Nafziger Road, Wilmot (Station 10)
- Woolwich Township (St. Jacobs) – 30 Parkside Drive (Station 6)

== See also ==
Paramedicine in Canada

- List of EMS Services in Ontario
- Paramedics in Canada
- Emergency Medical Services in Canada

Emergency services in Waterloo Region

- Waterloo Regional Police Service
- Kitchener Fire Department
