= BSP =

BSP may refer to:

== Business ==
- Bell System Practices, technical documentation series published internally by the AT&T Bell System
- Billing and Settlement Plan, an accounting system for airlines
- Business service provider, a category of company providing business processes as services
- Business system planning, a method of analysing, defining and designing the information architecture of organisations

== Science and technology ==
- Bone sialoprotein, a component of mineralized tissues
- British Standard Pipe, an international standard set of screw thread sizes used in pipes and pipe fittings outside the US
- British space programme, the centre for all space-related activities in Britain
- Bromsulphthalein, a dye used in liver function tests

=== Computing ===
- Binary space partitioning, a method for recursively subdividing a space
- Bit-slice processor, a cascadable processor architecture
- BSP (file format), used in games such as the Quake series and games that use the Source game engine
- Blog service provider, a company offering blog services
- Board support package, software needed to operate motherboards
- Boot-strap-processor, used to start a computer
- Broadband service provider, a company offering Internet access
- Bug squashing party, a collaborative event held to eliminate software bugs
- Bulk synchronous parallel, an abstract computer model for designing parallel algorithms
- Business system planning, a business methodology developed by IBM
- Byte Stream Protocol, part of the Xerox PARC Universal Packet network protocol suite

== Organisations ==
- Bangko Sentral ng Pilipinas, the Central Bank of the Philippines
- Bank South Pacific, the largest bank in Papua New Guinea
- Beta Sigma Phi, a non-academic sorority
- Bhilai Steel Plant, in India
- Boy Scouts of the Philippines, scouting organization in the Philippines
- British School of Paris, a private school in Croissy-sur-Seine, France
- British Society for Phenomenology
- Brunei Shell Petroleum, a joint venture between the Government of Brunei and Shell

=== Politics ===
- Bahujan Samaj Party (disambiguation)
- British Socialist Party
- Bulgarian Socialist Party

== Places ==
- Bayside State Prison, New Jersey, US
- Baxter State Park, a wilderness park in Maine, US
- Brondesbury Park railway station (station code), London, England
- Bilaspur Junction railway station (station code: BSP), Chhattisgarh, India
- Bandar Saujana Putra (abbreviated to BSP), township in the state of Selangor, Malaysia

== Other uses ==
- Bachelor of Pharmacy, an undergraduate academic degree in pharmacy
- Bachelor of Science in Paramedicine, a four-year academic degree in the science and principles of paramedicine
- Bradley Steven Perry (born 1998), American actor
- British Sea Power, an English rock band now known as just Sea Power
- Cartagena Protocol on Biosafety, or biosafety protocol

== See also ==
- .bsp (disambiguation)
- JBSP (disambiguation)
