= Hormozgan University of Medical Sciences =

University

- دانشگاه علوم پزشکی و خدمات بهداشتی درمانی هرمزگان
- Established: 1987; 39 years ago
- Chancellor: Dr. Pejman Shahrokhi
- Administrative staff: 263
- Students: 3,100
- Location: Bandar Abbas, Iran; 27°14′29″N 56°21′27″E
- Website: hums.ac.ir
- Location within Iran

Hormozgan University of Medical Sciences (Persian: دانشگاه علوم پزشکی و خدمات بهداشتی درمانی هرمزگان) is a public university in Bandar Abbas, Iran. The university has six faculties including medicine, dentistry, pharmacy, health care, nursing, paramedicine and two satellite schools in Minab and Bandar Lengeh.
