= Bahujan Samaj Party (disambiguation) =

Bahujan Samaj Party (lit. 'Major People's Party') is a national political party in India.

Bahujan Samaj Party may also refer to:

- Bahujan Samaj Party (Ambedkar), a splinter political party in Punjab, India; founded by Devi Das Nahar
- Bahujan Samaj Party (Kainth), a splinter political party also in Punjab, India; founded in 2004 by Satnam Singh Kainth
- Jantantrik Bahujan Samaj Party, a splinter political party in India; founded in 1997, allied with the BJP
- Bahujan Samaj Party of Nepal, political party in Nepal; based on the Indian political party

== See also ==
- BSP (disambiguation)
