= JBSP =

JBSP may refer to:

- Journal of the British Society for Phenomenology
- Jantantrik Bahujan Samaj Party, an Indian political party founded in 1997, split from the Bahujan Samaj Party
- Jai Bharat Samanta Party, an Indian political party

== See also ==
- BSP (disambiguation)
