= List of paramedicine schools in Australia =

A total of 14 Australian universities offer education in paramedicine, below is a table of entry-level qualifications offered in the field across these universities. A bachelor's degree is typically required for entry into the field.

== Table ==
Paramedicine schools in Australia
University	Location(s)	Degree(s)
Australian Catholic University	Blacktown, Brisbane and Melbourne	BParamed
Central Queensland University	Cairns, Rockhampton, Townsville and online	BParamedSc
Charles Darwin University	Alice Springs, Darwin	BParamed
Charles Sturt University	Bathurst, Port Macquarie and online	BParamed
Edith Cowan University	Perth	BSc(ParamedSc)
Flinders University	Adelaide	BParamed
Griffith University	Gold Coast	BParamed
La Trobe University	Albury-Wodonga, Bendigo	BParamedPrac (Hons)
Queensland University of Technology	Brisbane	BParamedSc
University of Southern Queensland	Ipswich	BParamed
University of Tasmania	Hobart, Sydney	BParamed
University of the Sunshine Coast	Sunshine Coast	BParamed
Victoria University	Melbourne	BParamed
Western Sydney University	Sydney	BParamed
