= Paramedic Association of Canada =

Founded in June 1988 as the Canadian Society of Ambulance Personnel (CSAP), the PAC is the national voice of paramedicine which supports paramedicine practitioners in providing high quality health care to patients. The CSAP was transformed into the Paramedic Association of Canada in 1997. The PAC has a voluntary membership of over 14,000 paramedicine practitioners across Canada. Each member belongs to a provincial chapter and/or the Canadian Armed Forces.
