= Kitchener Fire Department =

Operational area
- Country: Canada
- Address: 270 Strasburg Road; Kitchener, Ontario; N2E 3M6

Agency overview
- Employees: 229 (2020)
- Annual budget: $33.4 million (2020)
- Fire chief: Robert Gilmore
- EMS level: N/A - See Region of Waterloo Paramedic Service

Facilities and equipment
- Stations: 7
- Engines: 8 (including 2 spares)
- Trucks: 1
- Platforms: 1
- Quints: 1
- Rescues: 1
- Ambulances: See Region of Waterloo Paramedic Service
- Tenders: 1
- HAZMAT: 1

Website
- Official website

The Kitchener Fire Department provides fire protection, technical rescue services, hazardous materials response, and first responder emergency medical assistance to the city of Kitchener, Ontario. The department has seven fire stations and 229 employees.

== Fire Stations and Apparatus ==
In 2019, apparatus were re-numbered with a numerical prefix of 1 as part of regional re-organization. For example, Pumper 1 became Pumper 11, Pumper 2 became Pumper 12, and so on.

Station #	Pumper Company	Aerial Company or Tower Company	Miscellaneous or Support Units	Address	Build year
1 (Headquarters)	Pumper 11	Aerial 11	Rescue 11; Haz-Mat 11; Pumper 18 (Spare); Pumper 19 (Spare); Car 123 (Platoon Chief)	270 Strasburg Road	1999
2	Pumper 12	Aerial 12		187 Lancaster Street West	2000
3		Tower 13		1035 Ottawa Street North	2001
4	Pumper 14			25 Fairway Road North	1998
5	Pumper 15		Rescue 15 (Spare); Box 690 (canteen unit)	1700 Queens Boulevard	1998
6	Pumper 16			149 Pioneer Drive	1993
7	Pumper 17		Tanker 17	1440 Huron Road	2008

=== Pumpers ===
- 2x 2018 Rosenbauer Commander rescue pumpers (shop# 4547 and 4548) (Pumpers 11 and 16)
- 1x 2017 Rosenbauer Commander rescue-pumper (shop# 4545) (Pumper 15)
- 2x 2013 Spartan ERV Gladiator rescue-pumpers (shop# 4542 and 4543) (Pumpers 12 and 14)
- 1x 2013 KME Predator Severe Service pumper-tanker (shop# 4540) (Tanker 17)
- 3x 2008 KME Predator rescue pumpers (shop# 4534, 4535, and 4536) (Pumpers 17, 18, and 19)

=== Aerials ===
- 1x 2013 Pierce Impel 75' quint (shop# 4544) (Tower 13, former Pump 1)
- 1x 2009 Pierce Velocity 100' platform quint (shop# 4539) (Aerial 11, former Aerial 4)
- 1x 2007 Pierce Velocity 100' quint (shop# 4538) (Aerial 12)

=== Other ===
- 1x 2019 Chevrolet Tahoe command vehicle (Car 123)
- 1x 2018 KME Predator heavy rescue (shop# 4546) (Rescue 11)
- 1x 2014 Ford F-450 / Dependable command unit (shop# 4500)
- 1x 2008 Spartan Gladiator Classic / Dependable heavy rescue (shop# 4537) (Rescue 15, former Rescue 1)
- 1x 2001 Spartan Metro Star FF / SVI haz-mat unit (shop# 4526) (Haz-Mat 11)

=== Retired ===
- 2x 2007 Spartan Gladiator / Rosenbauer rescue-pumpers (shop# 4531 and 4532)
- 1x 2005 American LaFrance Eagle / LTI 75' quint (shop# 4529) (former Pump 6, sold to NOTL Fire)
- 1x 2003 Spartan Gladiator Classic / Dependable rescue-pumper (shop# 4528)
- 1x 2002 Spartan Gladiator FF / Luverne pumper-tanker (shop# 4527) (sold to Woolwich Township Fire Department)
- 1x 2000 Spartan Metro Star FF / SVI heavy rescue (shop# 4525)
- 1x 1999 Pierce Dash / Fort Garry 100' platform (shop# 4524)
