= .bsp =

.bsp or .BSP may refer to:

- .bsp (EAGLE), a file extension used by EAGLE for Gerber bottom solder paste files
- .bsp (Quake), a file extension used by Quake for binary space partitioning files

== See also ==
- BSP (disambiguation)
