= Bachelor of Science in Paramedicine =

Bachelor of Science Degree in Paramedicine is a four-year academic degree in the science and principles of paramedicine, granted by a tertiary education university or similarly accredited school year academic degree in the science and principles of paramedicine, granted by a tertiary education university or similarly accredited school.

== Bachelor of Science degree in Paramedicine in the United States ==
The Bachelor of Science Degree in Paramedicine is a four-year academic degree in the science and principles of paramedicine, granted by a tertiary education university or similarly accredited school. Though one is eligible to sit for the US National Registry examination, administered by the National Registry of Emergency Medical Technicians (NREMT), to become a Registered Paramedic after graduating from either a two-year program with an associate degree (A.A.S.; ADP) or from a highly concentrated certificate program, the BSP degree prepares paramedics for roles as EMS leaders, system directors, and community/industrial health and safety positions. Paramedics with a BSP are recognized to excel as teachers, researchers, and clinicians. While the BSP alone serves to well prepare the healthcare provider, it also serves as an appropriate science base for further medical training such as medical school (MD, DO) or physician assistant (PA) programs.

== Bachelor of Science degree in Paramedicine in Canada ==
The Bachelor of Science Degree in Paramedicine is a four-year academic undergraduate baccalaureate degree (B.Sc.P), conferred by a university or college (Canada) that is permitted to provide degrees. It is designed for paramedics in Canada which are currently registered and interested in enhancing their science knowledge as well as their research and communication skills, thus increasing access to post-graduate opportunities (e.g., master's degree programs) and improving paramedicine career prospects or in other fields. Two of the programs in Ontario and Alberta are entry-level for those wishing to train as paramedics at the baccalaureate degree level. There are in total four paramedicine degree programs across Canada. The University of Toronto located in Toronto, Ontario, Wilfrid Laurier located in Waterloo, Ontario, University of Prince Edward Island located in Charlottetown, Prince Edward Island and at Medicine Hat College located in Medicine Hat, Alberta.

== See also ==
- Bachelor of Science in Health Science: Paramedicine
