= Kisan Mazdoor Bahujan Party =

Political party in India

Kisan Mazdoor Bahujan Party (Peasants and Workers Majority Party) was a splinter group of the Jantantrik Bahujan Samaj Party in India. The leader of KMBP was Chaudhary Narendra Singh from Kanpur in the state elections in Uttar Pradesh in 2002, KMBP was an ally of the Bharatiya Janata Party (BJP), and launched two BJP-supported candidates. KMBP was part of the state government in Uttar Pradesh around 2002. KMBP joined the Indian National Congress ahead of the Lok Sabha elections 2004.
