= List of EMS Services in Ontario =

This is a list of Emergency Medical Services providers in the Canadian province of Ontario.

In 1999, the government of Ontario downloaded responsibility for the provision of Land Ambulance Services. In the southern half of the province, the responsibility fell onto Upper Tier Municipalities, such as county or regional governments as well as some larger cities and townships. In the north, it became the responsibility (for the most part) of District Social Service Boards. In both cases, UTMs/DSSBs may choose to operate the service directly, or, contract provision of service out to a third party provider, be it neighbouring service or private operator.

== Land Ambulance Service Providers in Southern Ontario ==
=== South Western Ontario ===
- Essex-Windsor EMS
- Lambton EMS
- Chatham-Kent EMS
- Middlesex-London EMS
- Huron County Paramedic Services
- Oxford County Paramedic Services
- Perth County Paramedic Services
- Bruce County Paramedic Service
- Grey County Paramedic Services
- Elgin-St. Thomas EMS
- Region of Waterloo Paramedic Services
- Dufferin County Paramedic Services
- Guelph-Wellington Paramedic Service

=== Central Ontario/Golden Horseshoe ===
- Hamilton Paramedic Service
- Norfolk County Paramedic Services
- Brant-Brantford Paramedic Services
- Haldimand County Paramedic Services
- Niagara Region EMS
- Peel Regional Paramedic Services
- Halton Region Paramedic Services
- Toronto Paramedic Services
- Region of Durham Paramedic Services
- York Region Paramedic Services
- County of Simcoe Paramedic Services
- Kawartha Lakes Paramedic Service
- Peterborough County-City Paramedics
- Northumberland Paramedics
- Haliburton County Paramedic Service

=== Eastern Ontario ===
- Hastings-Quinte Paramedic Services
- Lanark County Paramedic Service
- Leeds Grenville Paramedic Service
- Lennox & Addington Ambulance Service
- Frontenac Paramedic Services
- County of Renfrew Paramedic Service
- Ottawa Paramedic Service
- Cornwall SD&G Paramedic Services
- Prescott-Russell Paramedic Service

== Land Ambulance Service Providers in Northern Ontario ==
=== Central/North ===
- Muskoka Paramedic Services
- Parry Sound District EMS
- Nipissing Paramedic Services

=== Sudbury/Algoma ===
- Greater Sudbury Paramedic Services
- Manitoulin-Sudbury DSB Paramedic Services
- Algoma District Paramedic Services
- District of Sault Ste. Marie Paramedic Services

=== Timiskaming/Cochrane ===
- Timiskaming Paramedic Services
- Cochrane District EMS

=== Thunder Bay/Kenora/Rainy River ===
- Northwest EMS
- Rainy River District EMS
- Superior North EMS

== First Nations Ambulance Services ==
Operators that provide service to first nations communities are directly funded by the provincial government.

- Akwesasne Mohawk Ambulance
- Beausoleil First Nation EMS
- Weeneebayko Area Health Authority Paramedic Services
- Naotkamegwanning EMS
- Oneida Paramedic Services
- Rama Paramedic Services
- Six Nations Ambulance Service

== Air Ambulance Providers ==
Ornge (formerly Ontario Air Ambulance) is the statutory provider of air ambulance services in the province of Ontario. Ornge provides rotary and fixed wing coverage across the province. Where assets are unavailable or when additional capacity is required, Orgne has contracted with a number of providers to provide supplemental fixed wing coverage. These flights operate almost exclusively in the northern part of the province in order to facilitate access to specialized facilities available in more urban areas in the south. Services under contract include:

- Air Bravo
- Sky Care
- Thunder Air

Several other companies in the province offer air medical services as well, generally as repatriation flights for private insurance companies, however these services are not covered by OHIP.

== See also ==
- Paramedics in Canada
- Emergency medical services in Canada
