= Loktantrik Bahujan Samaj Party =

Defunt political party in India

Loktantrik Bahujan Samaj Party (Democratic Majority Society Party [DMSP]), splinter group of Bahujan Samaj Party formed in September 2003 when 37 Members of the Legislative Assembly of Uttar Pradesh broke away.

Led by Rajendra Singh Rana, they met the Speaker Kesrinath Tripathi and submitted a letter to ask for the recognition of the new party. In October the same year LBSP merged with the Samajwadi Party. The formation of LBSP was a way to avoid sanction under the Anti-Defection Law. The speaker Tripathi had recognised the breakaway group. But after three years, in January 2007, the Supreme Court, quashed the decision of the speaker and sent it back for the speaker to take a revised decision. By that time five of the MLAs joined back BSP and the new speaker Mata Prasad Pandey had disqualified them. Later, the five disqualified MLAs too approached the court. The elite court then ruled that the breakaway BSP MLAs will be continued as a separate group in the Assembly.
