= Jantantrik Bahujan Samaj Party =

Jantantrik Bahujan Samaj Party (JBSP) - 1997 breakaway from BSP, allied with BJP

Jantantrik Bahujan Samaj Party (Democratic Majority Society Party), a splinter group of Bahujan Samaj Party (BSP) formed in 1997 when 19 BSP Members of the Legislative Assembly of Uttar Pradesh broke away. JBSP allied themselves with Bharatiya Janata Party (BJP) and joined the National Democratic Alliance. In UP they supported Kalyan Singh's government. 17 JBSP MLAs were inducted as ministers in the state government. The president of JBSP was DP Yadav (Rajya Sabha MP) and the general secretary Shahidullah Khan.

JBSP became an unstable party and suffered various splits. Four MLAs defected to Lok Jan Shakti Party. Another splinter group was Kisan Mazdoor Bahujan Party.

When JBSP fell apart, DP Yadav organized the new party Rashtriya Parivartan Dal.

JBSP should not be confused with the other BSP splinter group: Loktantrik Bahujan Samaj Party.
