= Emergency medical services in Canada =

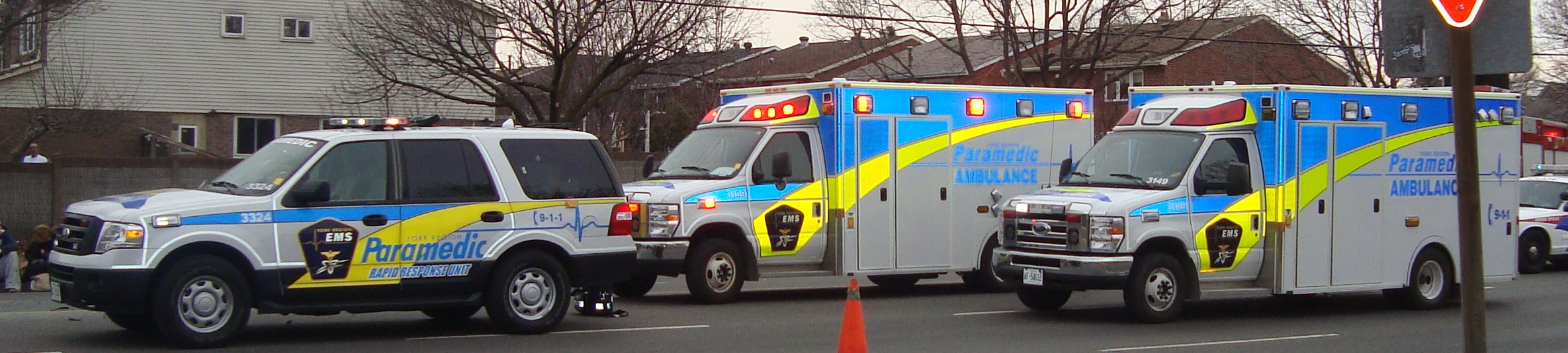
Emergency Medical Services on scene of an incident in York Region in Ontario

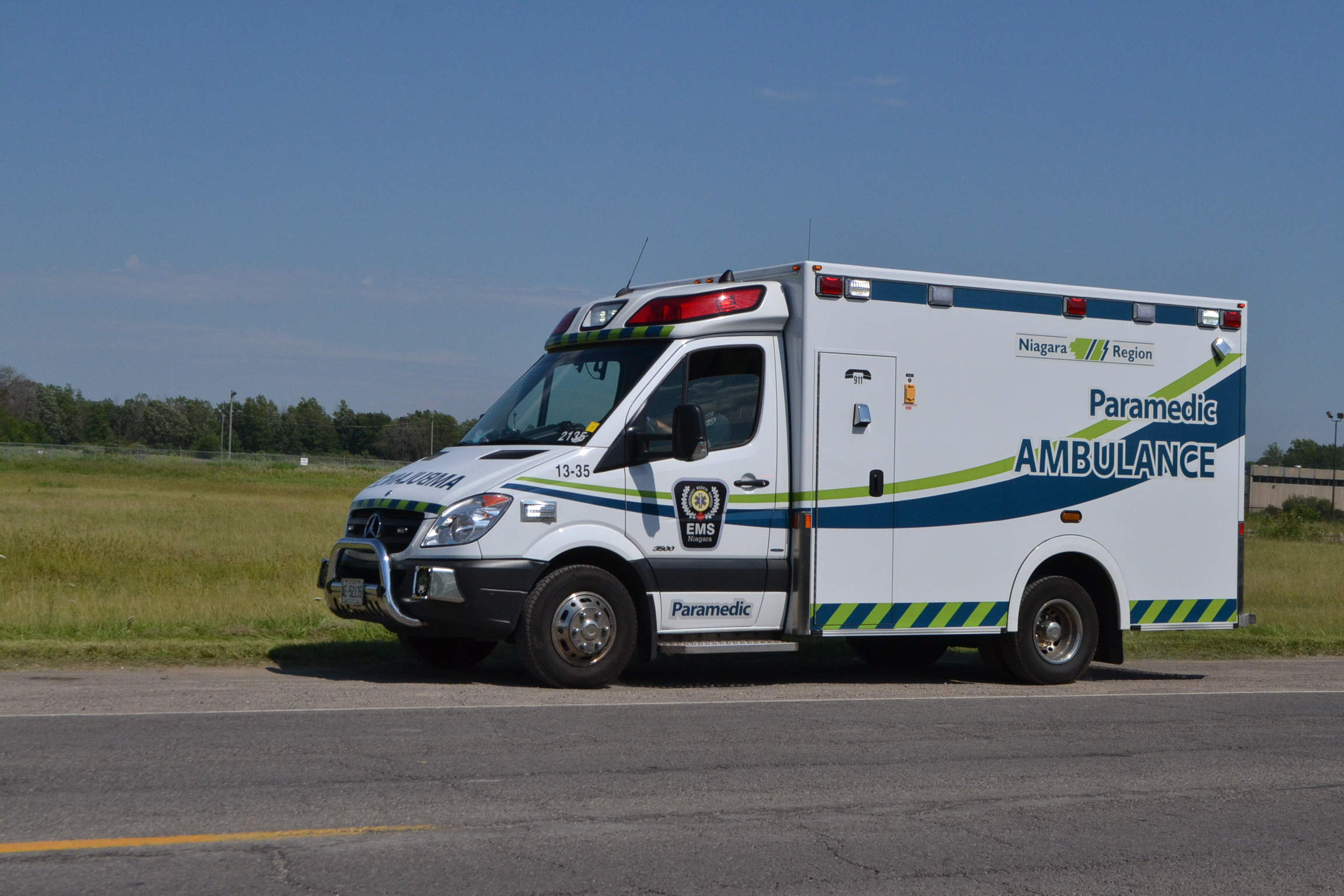
A small few ambulances in Canada are based on the Mercedes-Benz Sprinter chassis, like this Niagara Region example, although they are less common.

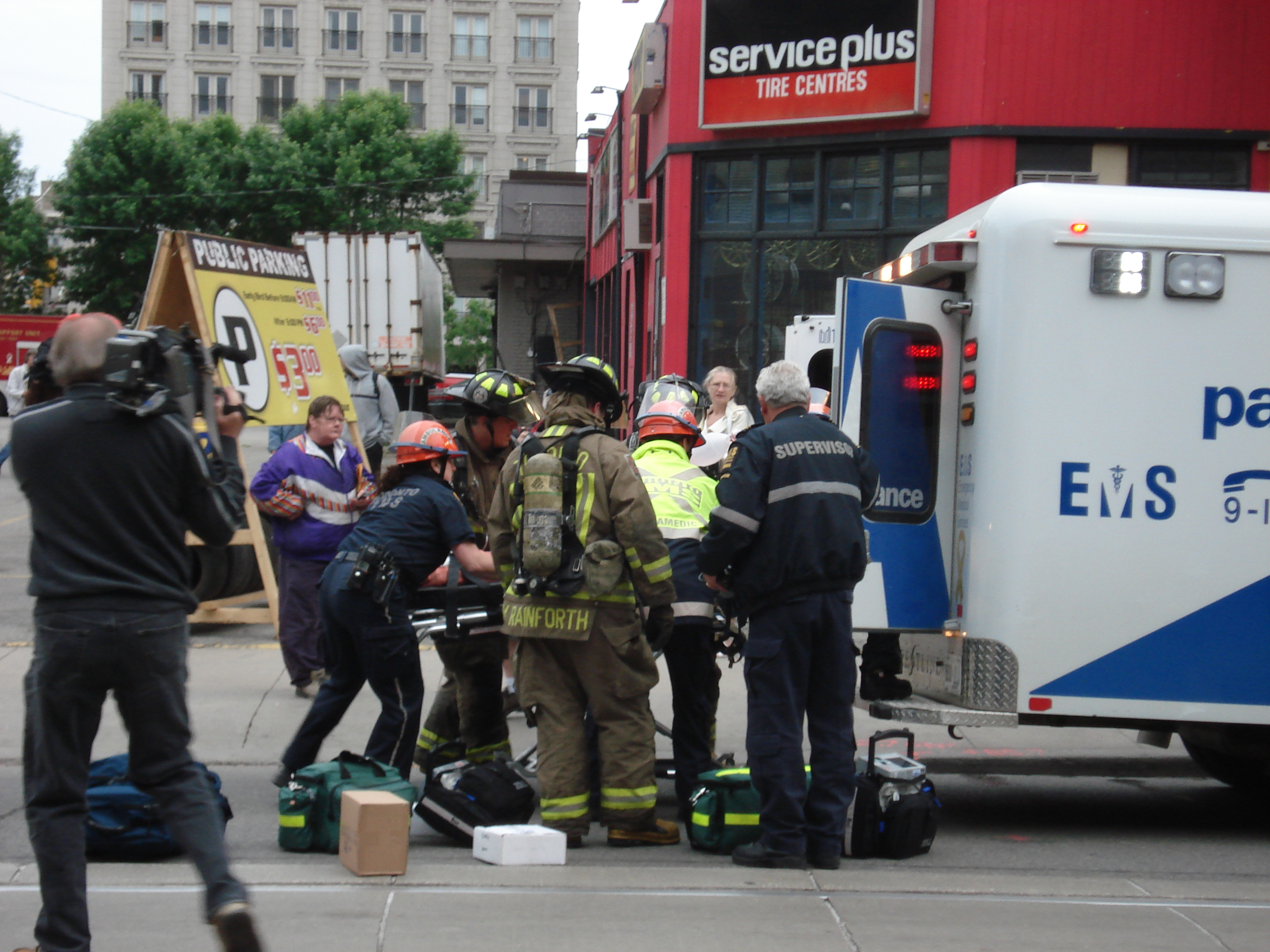
Toronto EMS prepare to transport a patient.

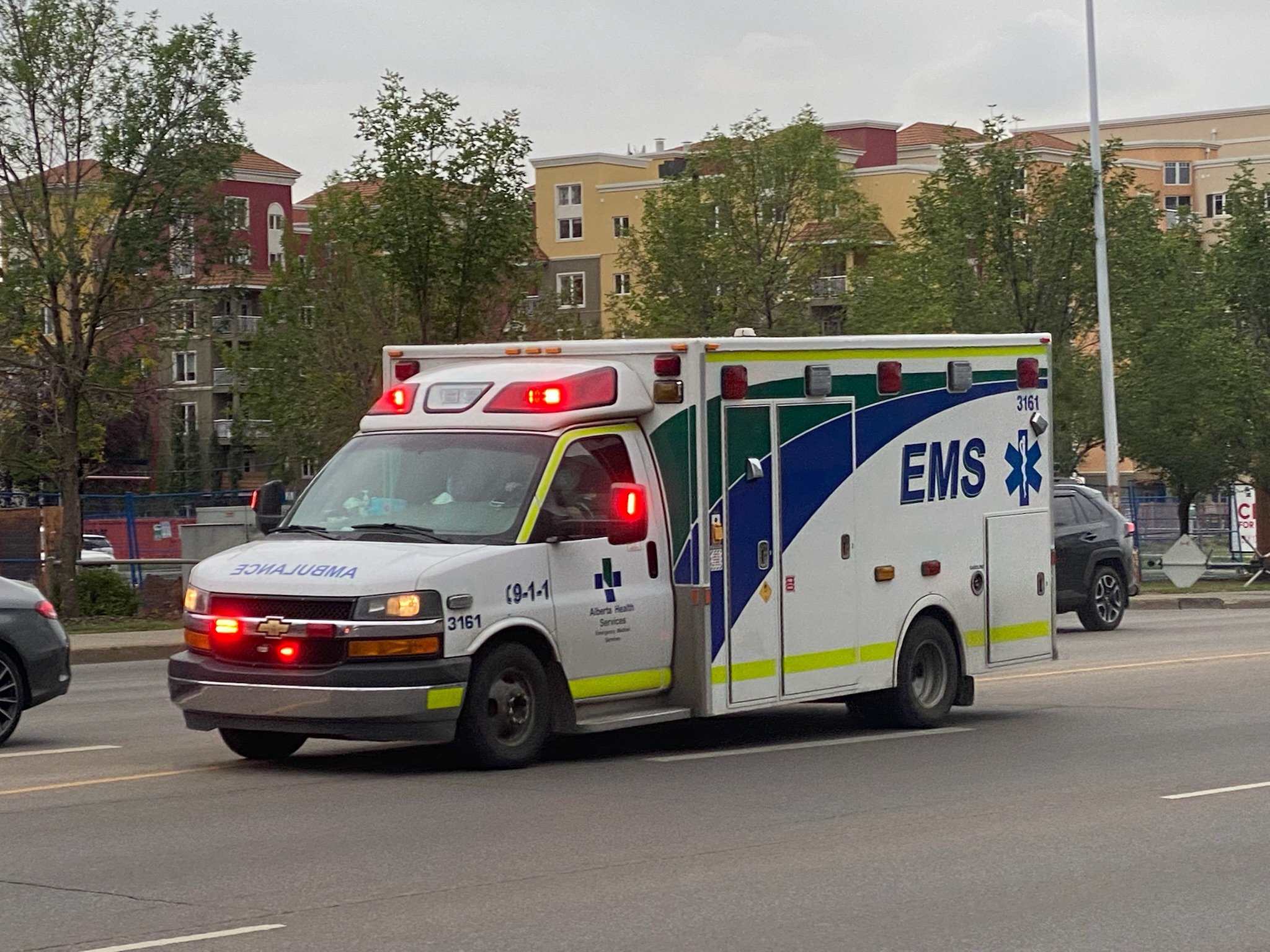
Alberta Health Services EMS Truck 3161. Most Ambulances in Canada use a GMC / Chevrolet cutaway van as their base.

Emergency medical services in Canada are the responsibility of each Canadian province or territory. The services, including both ambulance and paramedic services, may be provided directly by the province, contracted to a private provider, or delegated to local governments, which may, in turn, create service delivery arrangements with municipal departments, hospitals, or private providers. The approach, and the standards, vary considerably between provinces and territories.

== Organization ==
=== Rail ambulances ===
A rail ambulance is a vehicle used for medical transportation services on railway lines. The first rail ambulance was set up in 1920, in order to enable injured people to be transported to the nearest hospital, was set up in the coal mining community of Cape Breton, Nova Scotia. The car ran between #3 and #7 mines and Town of Sydney Mines. It was discontinued in 1922.

=== Land ambulance ===
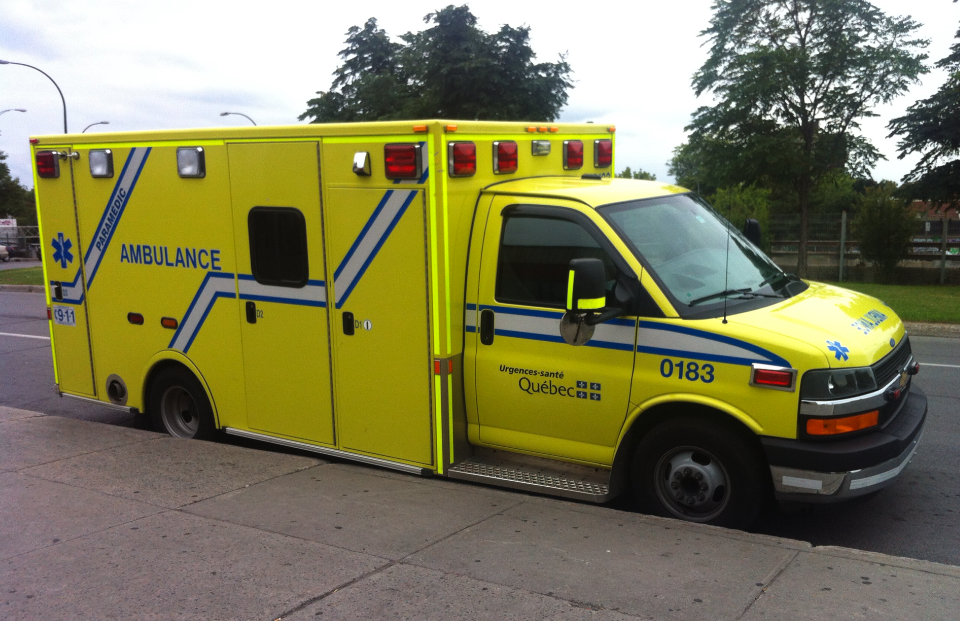
A land ambulance operated by Urgences-santé in Montreal, Québec

Responsibility for emergency medical services (EMS), as a part of health care in general, lies with the provinces and territories of Canada. With the exceptions of British Columbia and Alberta, which operate their EMS services directly, the method used for service delivery varies between jurisdictions. Typically, the provincial/territorial government provides enabling legislation, technical standards, accreditation or licensing, and oversight to a variety of operators, including municipalities, hospitals, and private companies. Municipalities or hospitals may also, in turn, elect to provide EMS service directly, as a branch of another municipal department, such as the fire department or health department, or may contract out this responsibility to a private company. The approaches used for service delivery are governed by what is permitted under the legislation of the individual province or territory, or under the by-laws of a municipality that has accepted responsibility for EMS service. Provincial governments may also, as in the case of the provinces of New Brunswick, Nova Scotia, and Prince Edward Island, contract directly with a single private company, in these cases Medavie Health Services, to provide province-wide services.

=== Air ambulance ===
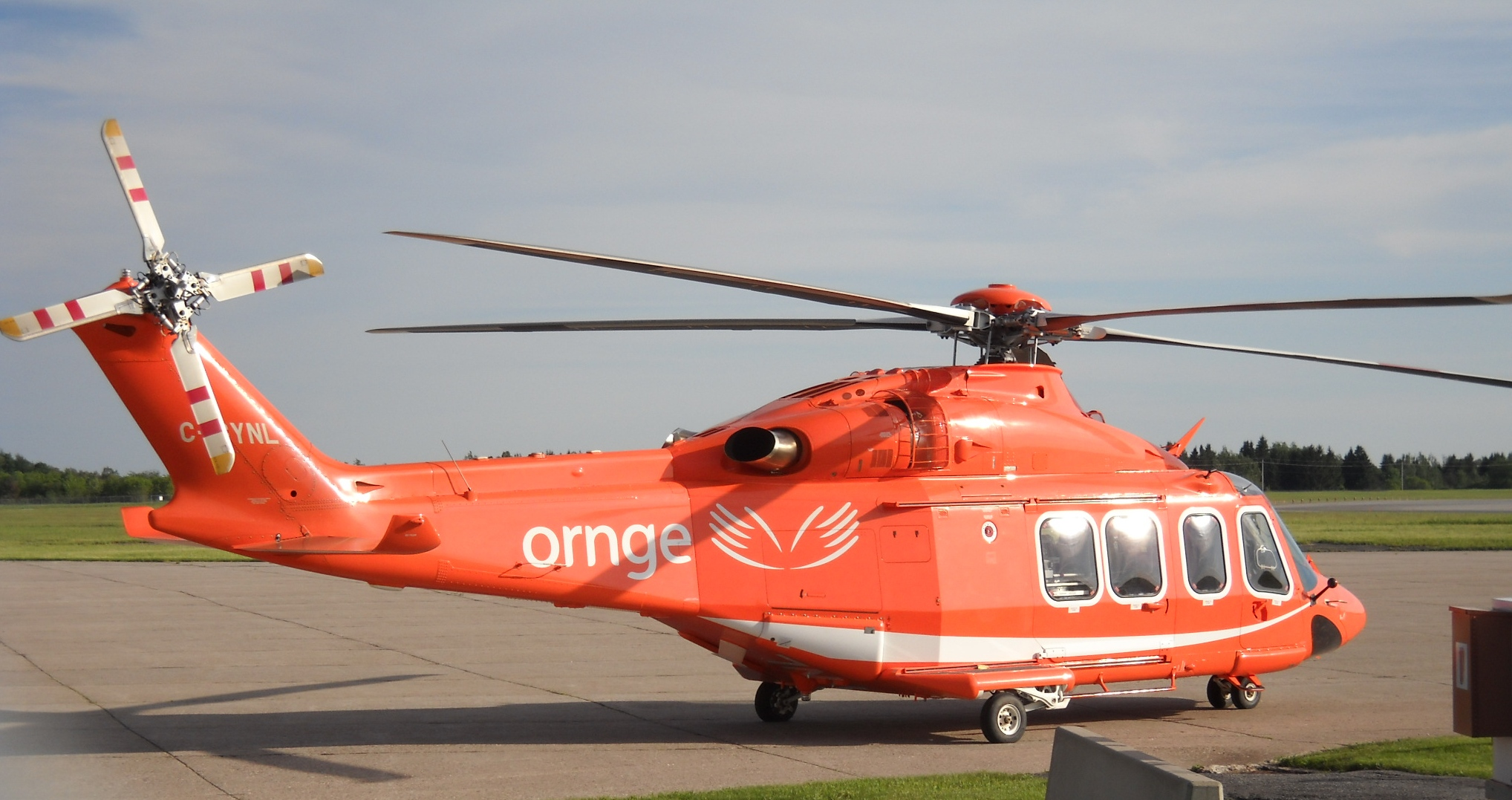
Ontario air ambulance operated by Ornge

Canadian provinces are also served by air ambulance services. These arrangements may come in a variety of forms, including direct service provision, contracts between private companies and the provincial government, or "subcontract" arrangements in which one private company takes the lead on service provision, perhaps even operating some of their own aircraft and providing dispatch services, but subcontracting many of the operations to smaller air charter services. In some cases, the inter-facility transport of high-acuity patients may be a mix of air-based and ground-based resources. Canada is a vast country, and its sheer size dictates that in many cases a helicopter-based air ambulance service is impractical as the distances required exceed the flight range of the aircraft. For this reason, the use of fixed-wing aircraft is commonplace. In some jurisdictions, not all air ambulance calls are emergencies, since distances to tertiary care centres mean that some patients with lower-acuity medical conditions are also flown.

== Standards ==
=== Vehicles ===
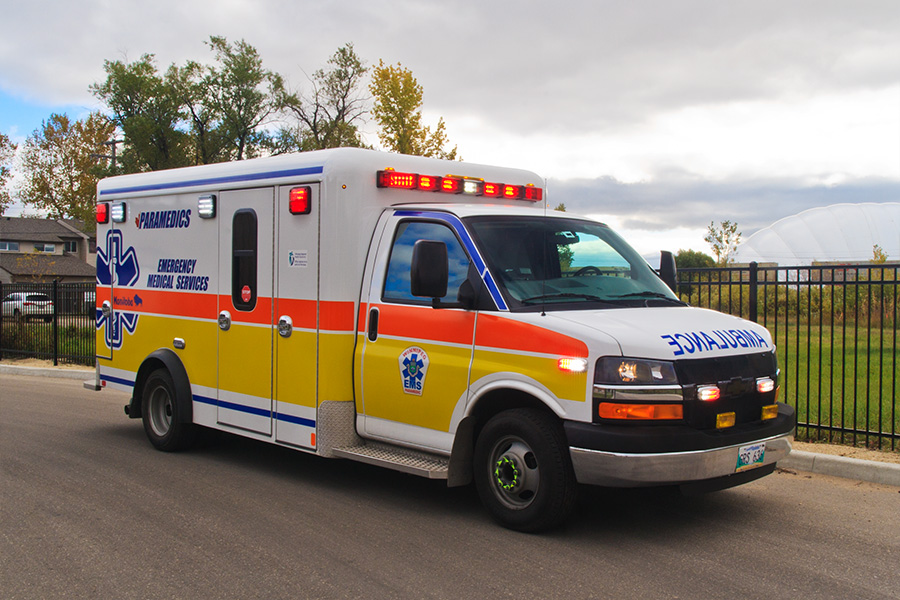
Winnipeg ambulance

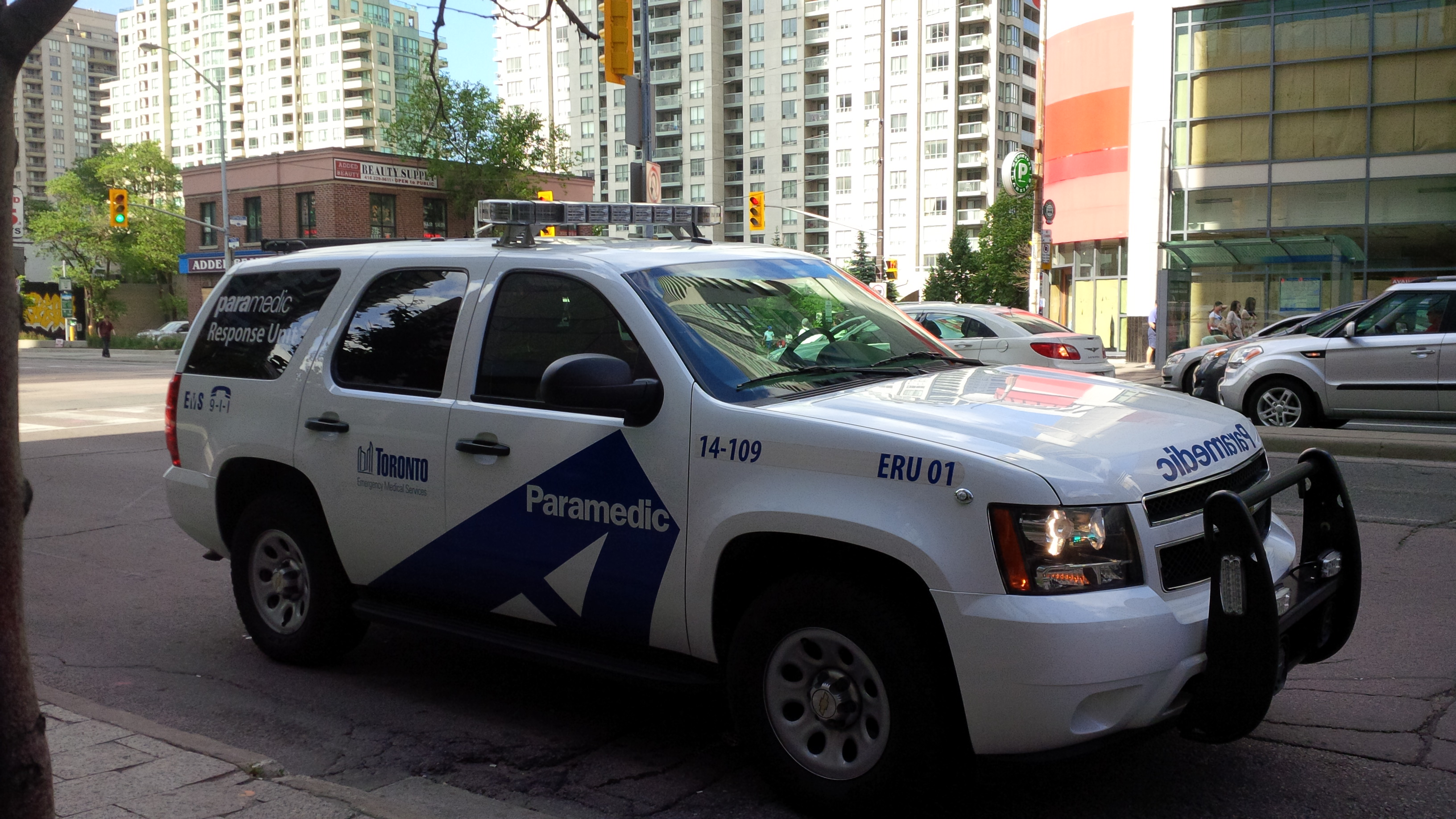
Toronto paramedic response unit

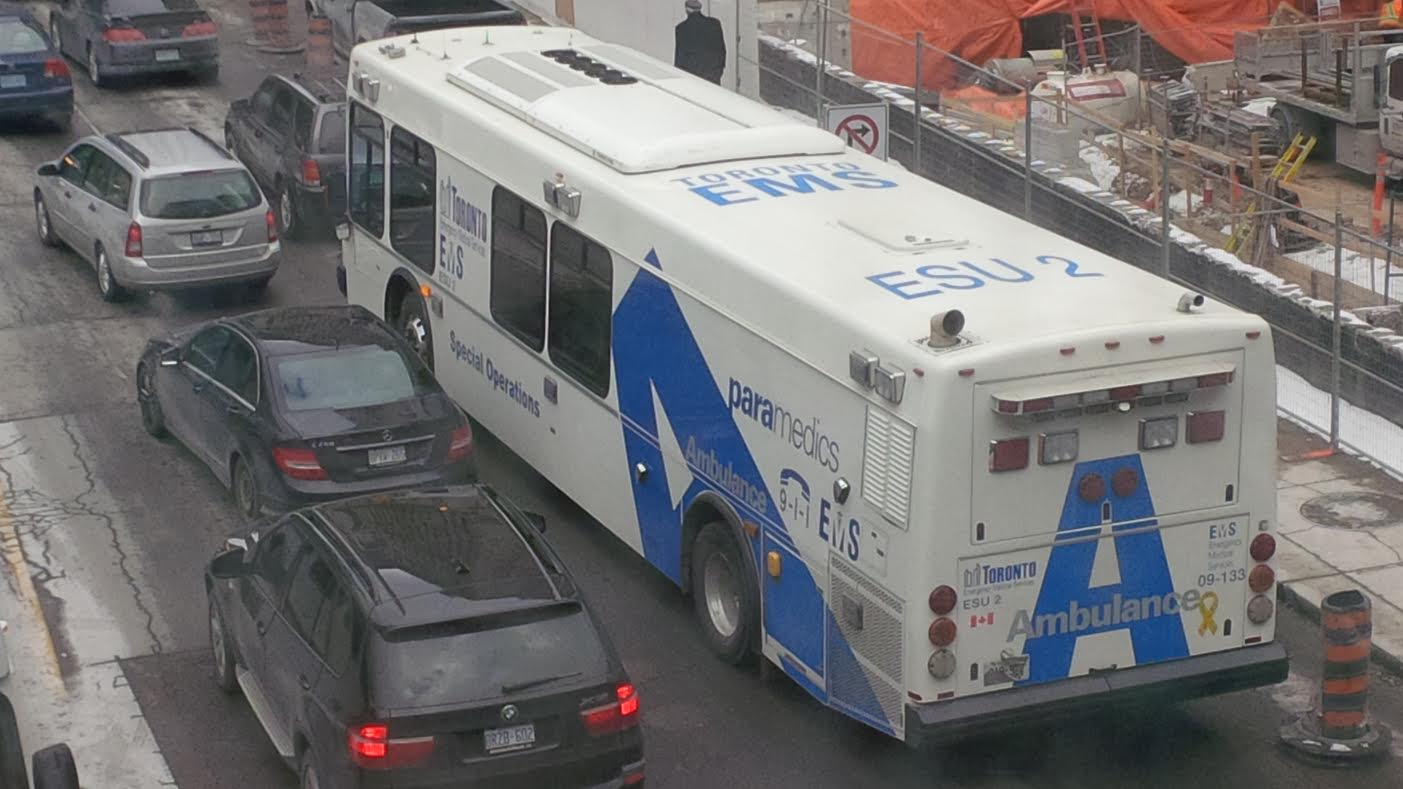
Toronto multi-casualty transport unit

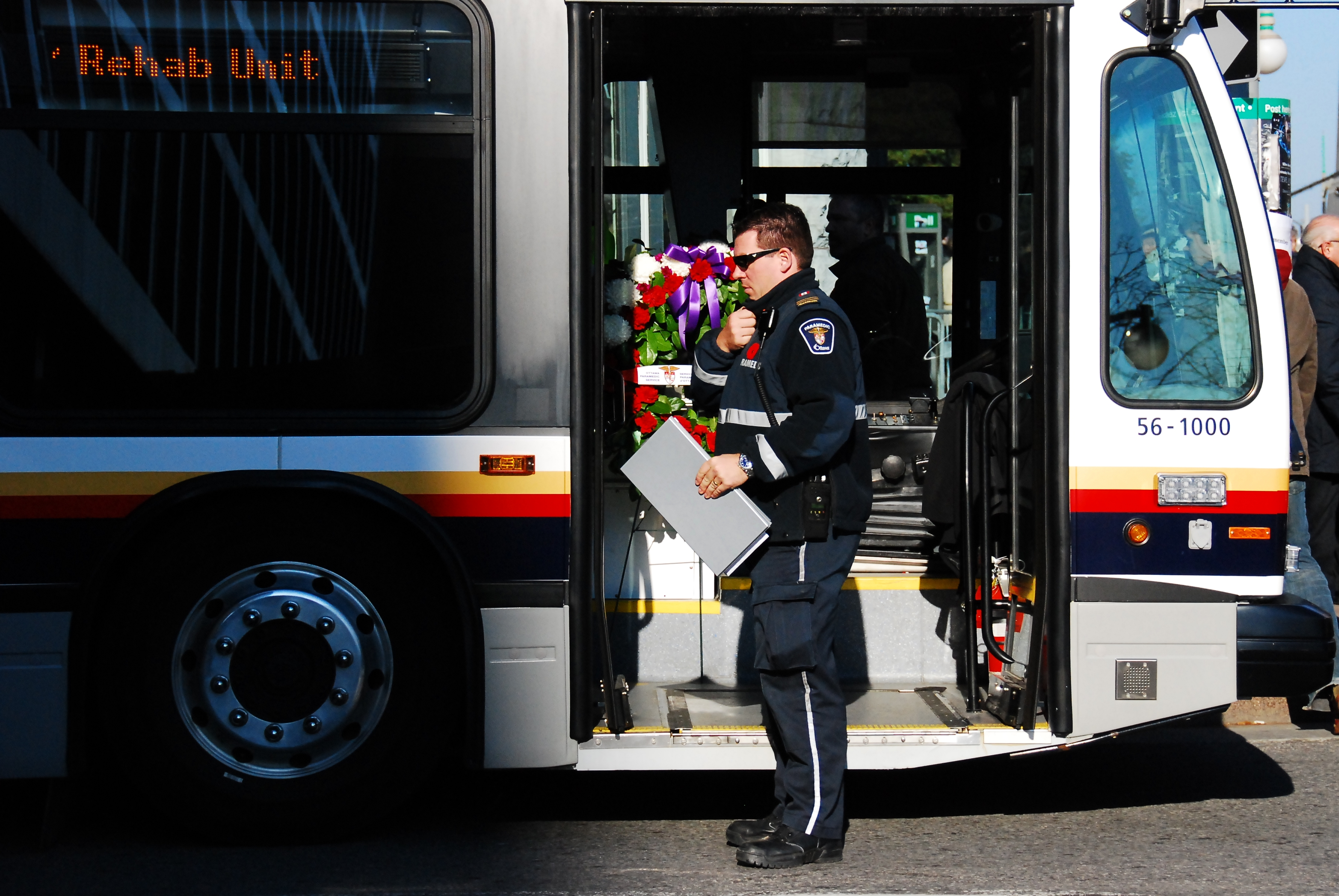
Ottawa Rehab Unit

Individual provinces and territories typically specify, generally through legislation and regulations, the specifications and types of vehicles to be used in EMS. These vehicles include ambulances, but may also include rapid response vehicles (sometimes called "fly-cars"), and specialized emergency support units, such as equipment vehicles and mass-casualty transport vehicles. Each province or territory, and also the Canadian military, has its own unique ambulance specifications. Individual provinces or territories may also specify types of mandatory equipment in those vehicles, including medical equipment.

Ambulances type in Canada are based on United States federal KKK-1822 Standards requirements:

- Type I Ambulances are based on the chassis-cabs of light duty pickup-trucks.
- Type II Ambulances are based on modern passenger/cargo vans.
- Type III Ambulances are based on chassis-cabs of light duty vans.

Bus-based and air ambulances are not based on these standards. Buses are mostly for ambulatory transfer only and offer less advanced care services.

=== Staffing and training ===
Individual provinces and territories also typically specify required levels of mandatory staff training. British Columbia, Alberta, Saskatchewan, Nova Scotia, Ontario, Prince Edward Island, and Yukon are served by highly educated paramedics with advanced skills. Other jurisdictions have not yet reached these levels, and some jurisdictions have introduced, or are considering introducing, critical care paramedics. Progress varies, driven primarily by public demand, acceptance by the medical community, and funding. A great deal of the recent advancement in standards of care and procedures has been driven by formal outcome-based research and clinical trials, such as the groundbreaking research work on the management of S-T segment elevation myocardial infarctions (STEMI), undertaken in cooperation with the Ottawa Paramedic Service. Some paramedics undertake their own formal research projects or collaborate with other researchers in the medical community, leading to publication (as with the preceding two references, both of which had paramedics in lead investigator roles).

In Ontario, paramedics are certified to administer symptom relief medications under a base hospital physician's license. The Ministry of Health and Long Term Care has established a minimum standard of care for the province, but base hospitals can add medications at their discretion. The number and type of medications beyond the minimum standard also varies with the paramedic scope of practice (primary, advanced or critical care).

=== Response times ===
Urban areas such as Toronto set standards according to percentiles. In Toronto, the standard is 8 minutes and 59 seconds or less 90 percent of the time on AMPDS triaged Delta and Echo calls. There is no jurisdiction in Canada that is currently reporting successful achievement of this response time standard, and services cite a variety of reasons for this failure, but continue to aspire to the standard. This approach to response time monitoring is accepted in most urban areas of the country, but there are some jurisdictions that set a second standard for rural areas (the majority of the country). Such standards vary from one jurisdiction to the next. Additionally, there are jurisdictions that do not set specific response time objectives, instead simply reporting average response times for emergency calls.

=== Towards national standards ===
There are currently major initiatives for improved standardization of staff training underway in Canadian EMS. The Paramedic Association of Canada has produced the National Occupational Competency Profile (NOCP), and several provinces are working toward meeting these standards. Provinces and territories are also responsible for standards with respect to the dispatching of EMS resources, and some jurisdictions are measuring performance, benchmarking and setting standards. In addition, initiatives by the Paramedic Chiefs of Canada organization are working towards improved interoperability and a best practice approach to the overall management of EMS systems. Several provinces have started testing using the COPR (Canadian Organization of Paramedic Regulators) licensing exam for both PCP and ACP levels. As of March 2018, these include British Columbia, Saskatchewan, Manitoba, Nova Scotia, P.E.I., and Newfoundland and Labrador.

== Funding and costs ==
EMS services in Canada are generally funded, at least in part, and to varying degrees, by the Ministry of Health or Health Department of the province or territory in which they operate. Paramedics and ambulance services are not mentioned in the Canada Health Act, and are therefore not an insured service. Provinces may choose to subsidize some of the cost, usually just for patients with valid provincial health cards. Health insurance in Canada is universal and publicly funded, so the cost of emergency ambulance services is covered to some degree. The degree to which individual use of EMS is subsidized by provincial health insurance varies by province, and may be supplemented either by partial fees for service, or by the property tax revenues of municipalities operating such services. In some jurisdictions, funding is at 100 per cent, and occurs without the patient being aware of its existence. Other jurisdictions fund at varying levels, but may require payment up front. In most cases this is later reimbursed. This may be particularly true of out of jurisdiction services, with an individual from one province who requires EMS service in another province being required to pay for that service and then submit the receipt to their own provincial health insurance scheme for reimbursement. In some jurisdictions, such as Ontario, a deterrent fee scheme is used to discourage the medically unnecessary use of EMS by the public. In such cases, the provincial health insurance scheme pays the majority of the cost of EMS service (around 80 per cent) for medically necessary EMS service, but when a physician decides that the service was not medically necessary, they can cause the patient to pay the full, uninsured amount of the charge, with the patient receiving a bill for the additional deterrent fee at some point after the emergency is over. Within Ontario, for example, such deterrent billing occurs through the receiving hospital, despite the fact that the hospital neither provides nor oversees EMS in most cases.

=== Private transport services ===
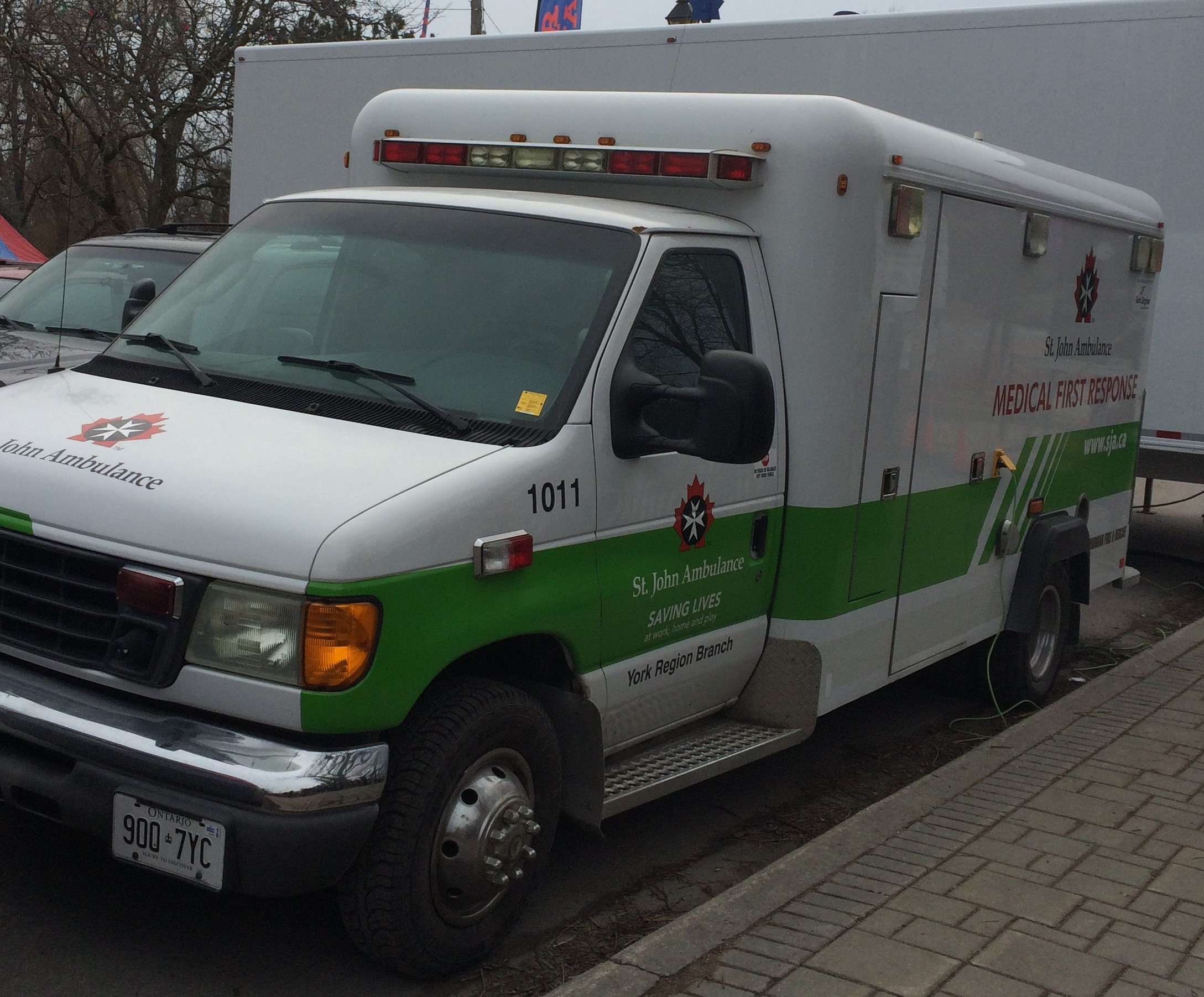
A St John Ambulance, a common private transport service in Canada

In addition to regular EMS, many jurisdictions also operate non-emergency patient transport services. In many jurisdictions, there are also companies who specialize in non-emergency patient transfers. Such companies have their own vehicles, which are similar to ambulances and carry some similar patient care equipment. These services can relieve the workload on public EMS through the elimination of some, or most, of the non-emergency transfer volume, and some provide service to the public that is of the highest standard. In many cases, such services are small private businesses, using second-hand ambulances which have been retired from public EMS service, while others use vehicles expressly built for their purposes. There has, however, been some controversy, in some jurisdictions, with respect to the operating procedures of some (but not all) of these services. In some cases, the vehicles are often made to look as much like EMS ambulances as possible, even retaining emergency lights and sirens (which they are forbidden by law to use), and incorporating the word "paramedic" (this term is not protected in Canada yet), variations on "EMS" (in some cases, "event medical services") or spelling variations of "ambulance", such as "ambu-lans", or using the Star of Life logo on their vehicle markings. These services are not generally licensed, or required to meet any recognized standard. These services generally attempt to recruit staff who meet provincial EMS qualification standards, but are under no legal obligation to do so. Such services are not covered by provincial health insurance, operate on a fee-for-service basis, and are not considered to be a legitimate part of mainstream EMS.

== Other EMS Operations in Canada ==
An Island EMS vehicle from Prince Edward Island

EMS services are publicly operated, and many by the provincial ministry of health (mostly since the 1970s). In Ontario services were devolved to local municipalities in the 1990s.

- Alberta Health Services
- British Columbia Ambulance Service
- List of EMS Services in Ontario
  - Ottawa Paramedic Service
  - Region of Waterloo EMS
  - Toronto Paramedic Services
  - York Region EMS
- Urgences-santé (Montreal region)
- New Brunswick Emergency Medical Services (Province of New Brunswick)
- Emergency Health Services (Province of Nova Scotia)
- Island EMS (Province of Prince Edward Island)

== See also ==
- Air ambulance
- Emergency Medical Dispatcher
- Friendly caller program
- Paramedics in Canada
- 9-1-1
