= Urgences-santé =

EMS provider in Montreal and Laval, Quebec, Canada

- Established: 1989
- Headquarters: Montreal, Quebec
- Jurisdiction: City
- Total area (sq. miles): 744 square kilometres (287 sq mi)
- Employees: 1,300, including 1,000 paramedics
- BLS or ALS: Both
- Ambulances: 165
- Chief: François Charpentier
- Medical director: Dr. Jocelyn Barriault
- Responses: 267, 666 (2017-2018)
- Website: urgences-sante.qc.ca

Urgences-santé (English: Health Emergencies) is the statutory public emergency medical service for the islands of Montreal and Laval, Quebec. The corporation operates a fleet of 165 vehicles and employs over 1,300 people, including 891 professional paramedics. Urgences-santé is one of the largest paramedical services in Canada.

== Organization ==
Urgences-santé as a corporation was formally created in 1989 under section 149.1 of the Loi sur les services de santé et les services sociaux and granted jurisdiction as a public health agency on the islands of Montréal and Laval, where it is responsible for the planning, organization, coordination and evaluation of emergency medical services; the operation of an ambulance service, a first responder service, and a medical communications centre; providing management, training and expertise consultancy services to emergency medical service partners and maintaining the ability to commercialize such services in Québec, Canada and abroad.

The corporation is the sole provider of advanced life support services in its jurisdiction, and a major provider of basic life support (BLS) alongside the Service de sécurité incendie de Montréal (the Montreal City Fire Department), the Département de sécurité incendie de Laval (Laval Fire Department), and various partners in the community, including Côte Saint-Luc Emergency Medical Services. Field operations are carried out by nearly a thousand full-time paramedics.

== Operations ==
Urgences-santé is responsible for an area of over 744 square kilometres (287 sq mi) with a population of over 2.3 million people. It maintains a fleet of 165 ambulances and performs over 272,000 medical transports every year to, or between, 23 hospitals in the Montreal metropolitan region. Of the 363,000 emergency and non-emergency calls received in 2011, 285,000 required an ambulance dispatch, 226,000 required an ambulance transport, 70,000 required a priority 1 response for life-threatening situations, and 224 required a major emergency service mobilization. Operations are managed from three regional divisions: East, West and North.

The ambulance service also maintains specialized units:

- Montreal Metro team that performs over 600 interventions a year in the metro
- Bicycle patrol team that performs over 450 sorties to cover summer festivals and events
- Technical support team that performs close to 3,000 interventions in support of paramedics
- Tactical team that is tasked with performing some 270 high-risk medical interventions alongside the Montreal and Laval SWAT teams.

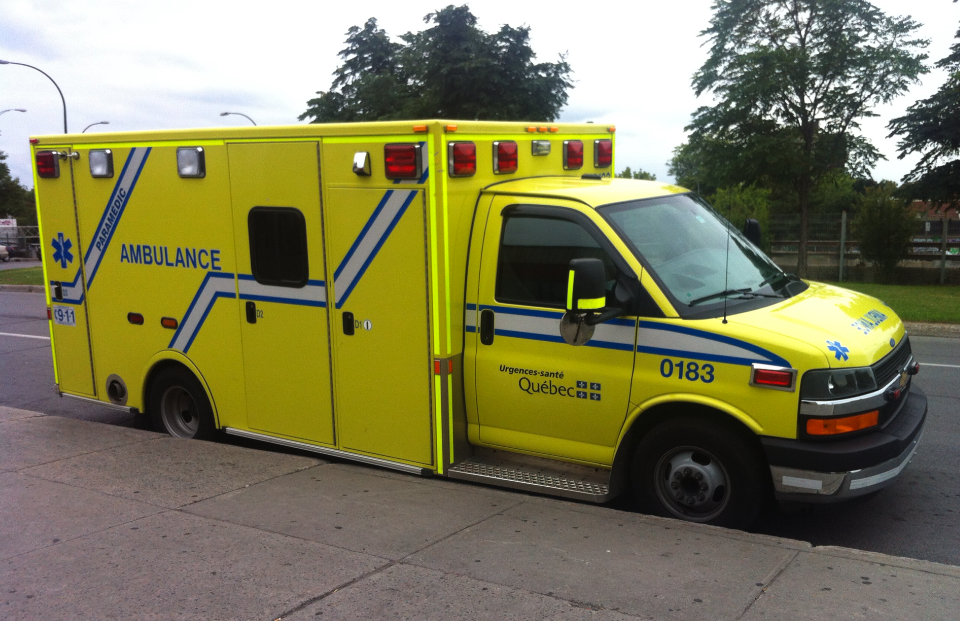
Urgences-santé Ambulance in front of Villa-Maria metro station

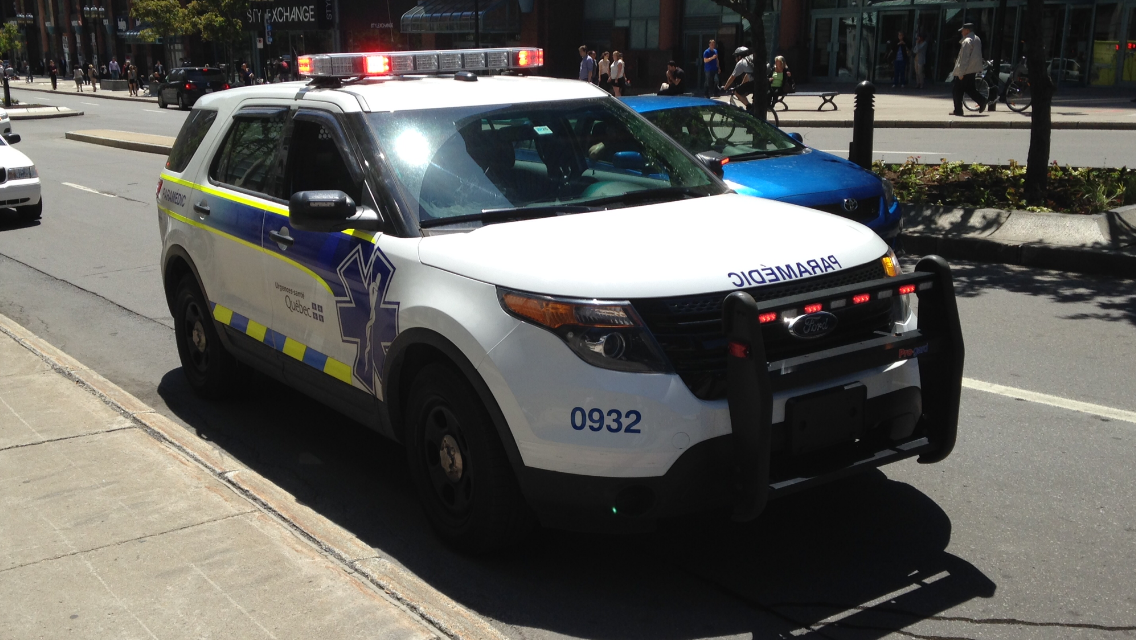
A Ford Explorer EMS Supervisor Car

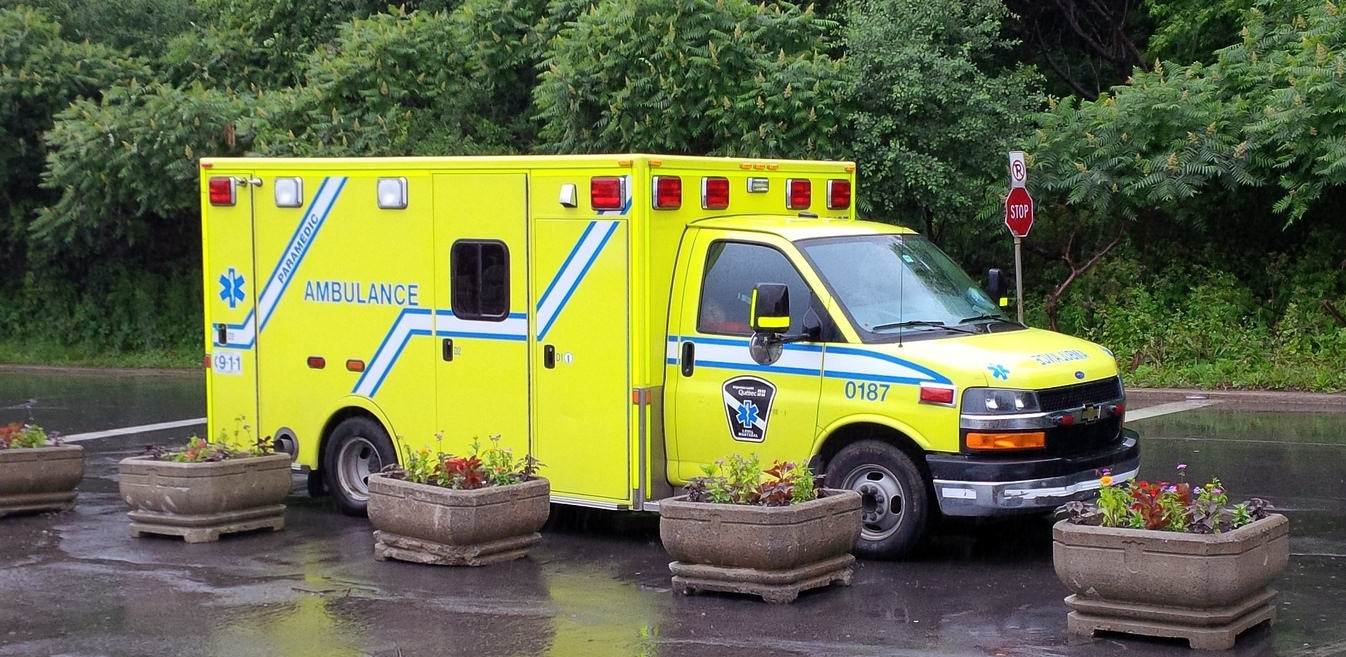
An Urgences-santé ambulance near the Summit Lookout in Westmount

== History ==
A citywide ambulance service was originally introduced by the Service de police de la Ville de Montréal in 1958. Many of the suburban municipalities followed Montréal's lead; island-wide service was provided when police services were centralized under the Montreal Urban Community in 1970. By the late 1970s, however, police ambulance training and equipment had fallen behind contemporary standards and the service was finally withdrawn. Urgences-santé was created in 1981 by forming a centralized dispatch system for the region's 25 privately owned ambulance services. The original full name was Centre de coordination des urgences santé (Health Emergencies Coordination Centre). As part of the program, a single telephone number for emergency medical services was introduced for the islands of Montreal and Laval (842-4242). All private services were invited to use Urgences-santé for dispatch and later, billing. The contracting companies were paid to maintain ambulance availability and on a per-call basis. The consolidation of private companies and the creation of a militant labour organization led to significant instability, including a strike in 1986. In 1989, following the transfer of ambulance service to the health and social services department, the system was re-organized and formalized by an act of the Quebec National Assembly.

=== Advanced care paramedics ===
Historically staffed exclusively by primary care paramedics, one cohort of advanced care paramedics was trained in the late 1980s.

In 2016, a new 2-year advanced care paramedicine program was launched at Université de Montréal. The first cohort graduated in 2018.

== Workplace incivility and violence allegations ==
On September 28, 2020, Nicola D’Ulisse, CEO of Urgences-Santé, steps down temporarily after two complaints related to the policy of prevention and management of workplace incivility, harassment and violence of Urgences-Santé. Mr Yvan Gendron is announced as the new temporary CEO. An official investigation is announced.

On December 18, 2020, Urgences-Santé announces the permanent step down of M.D'Ulisse as its CEO.

No information are available concerning the findings of the investigation about the actions of Nicola D’Ulisse during is time working at the corporation.

== See also ==
- Service de sécurité incendie de Montréal
- Service de police de la Ville de Montréal
