= Paramedics in Canada =

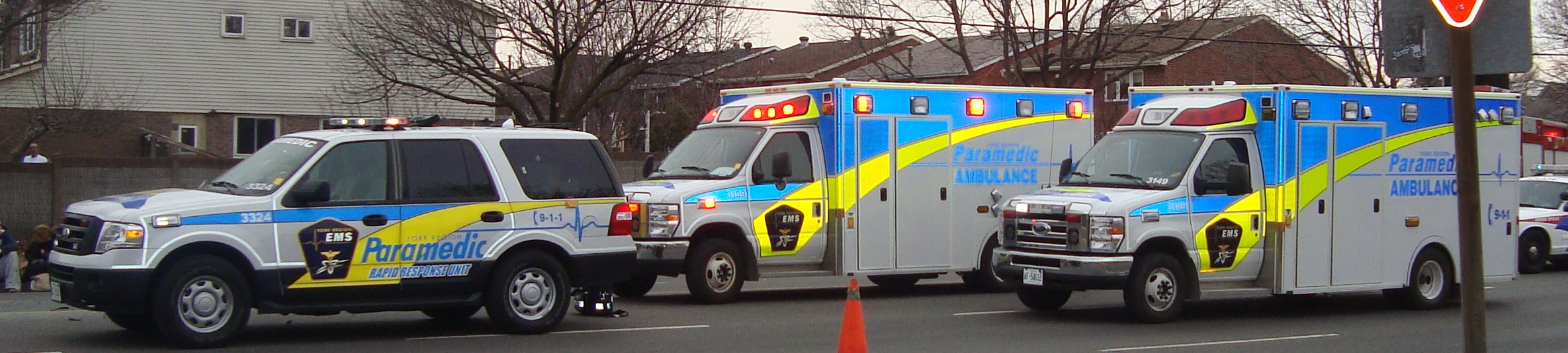
Paramedics on scene of an incident in York Region in Ontario

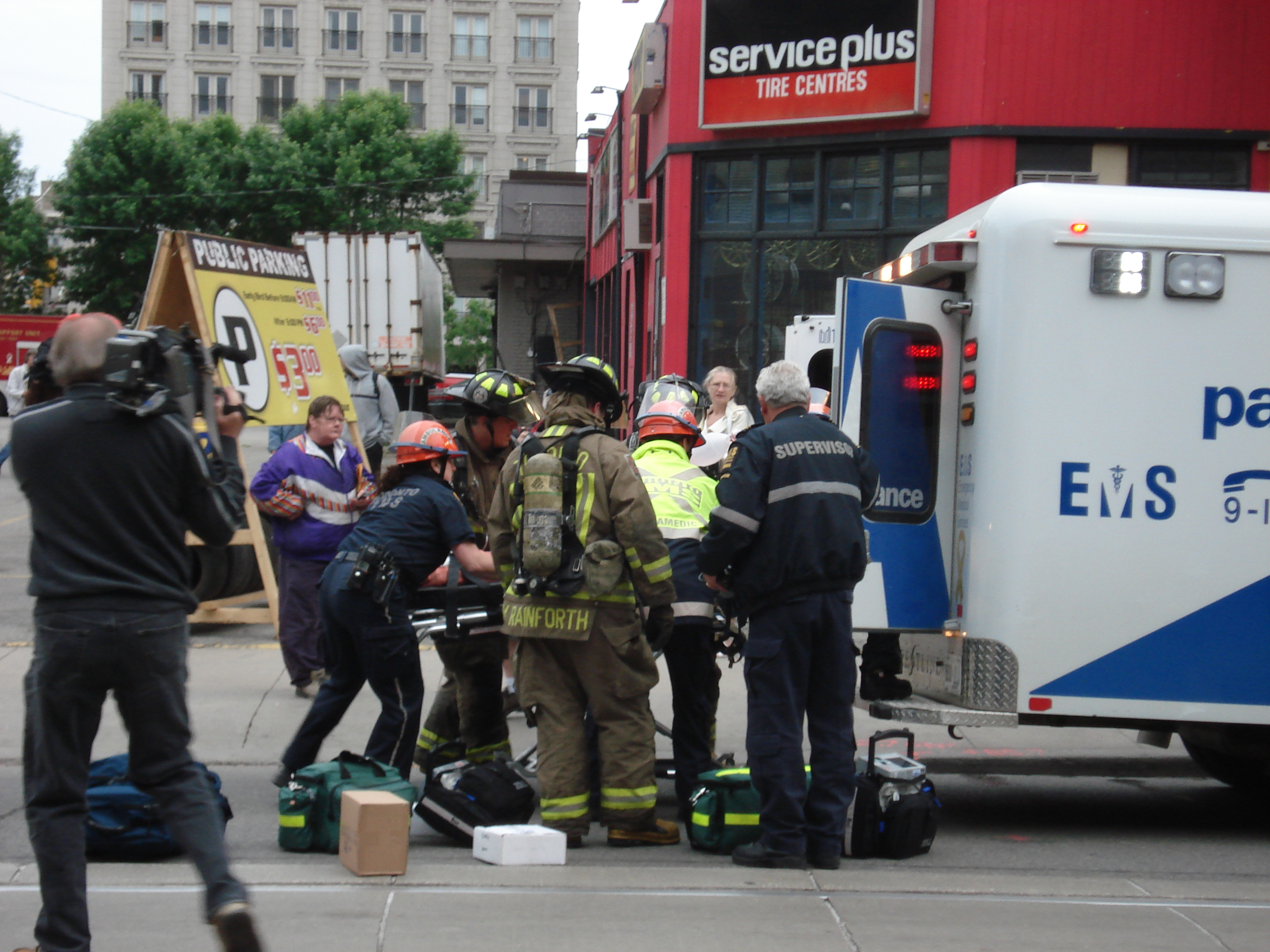
Paramedics prepare to transport a patient in Toronto.

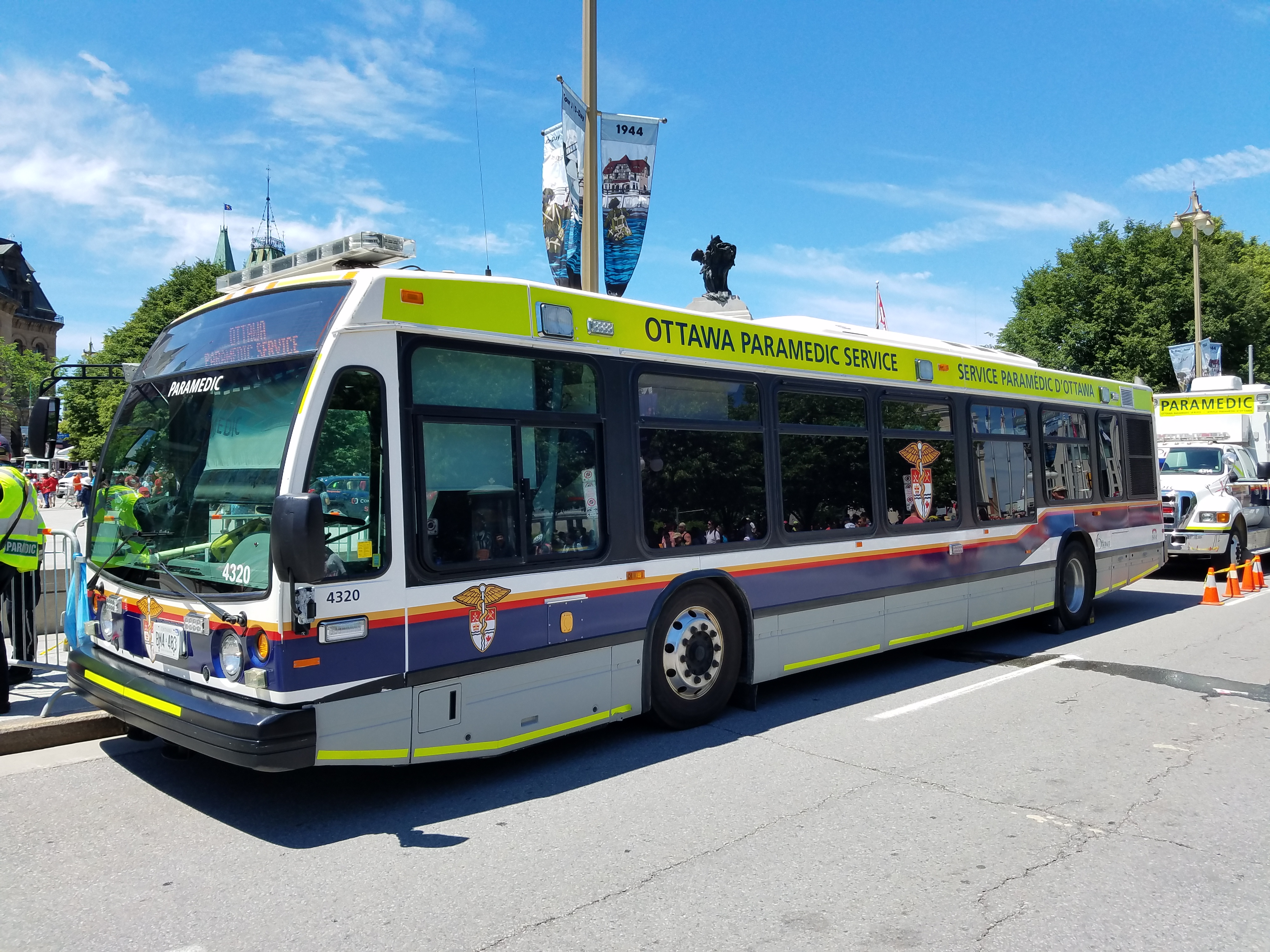
Ottawa Paramedic Bus

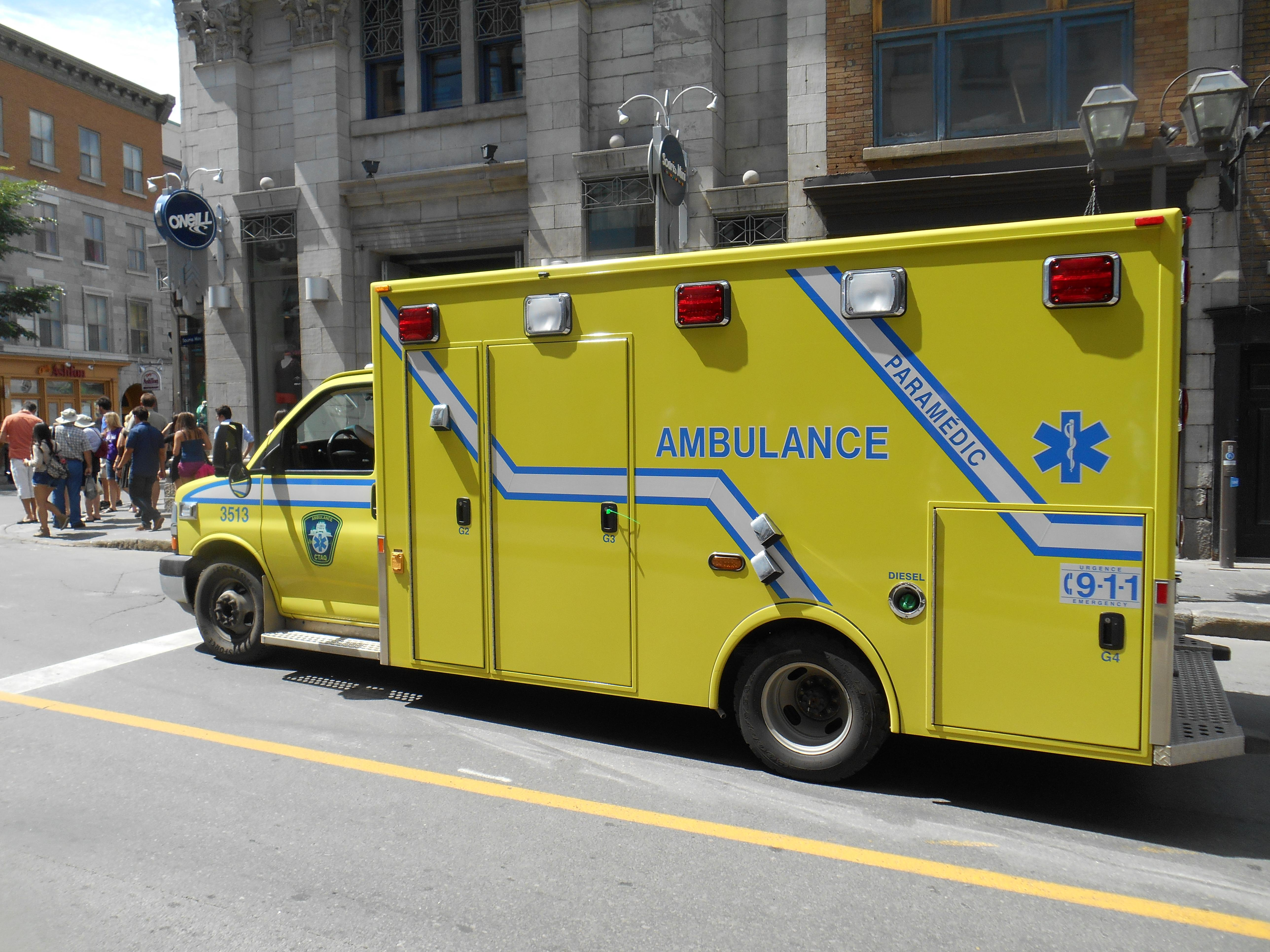
Quebec Ambulance

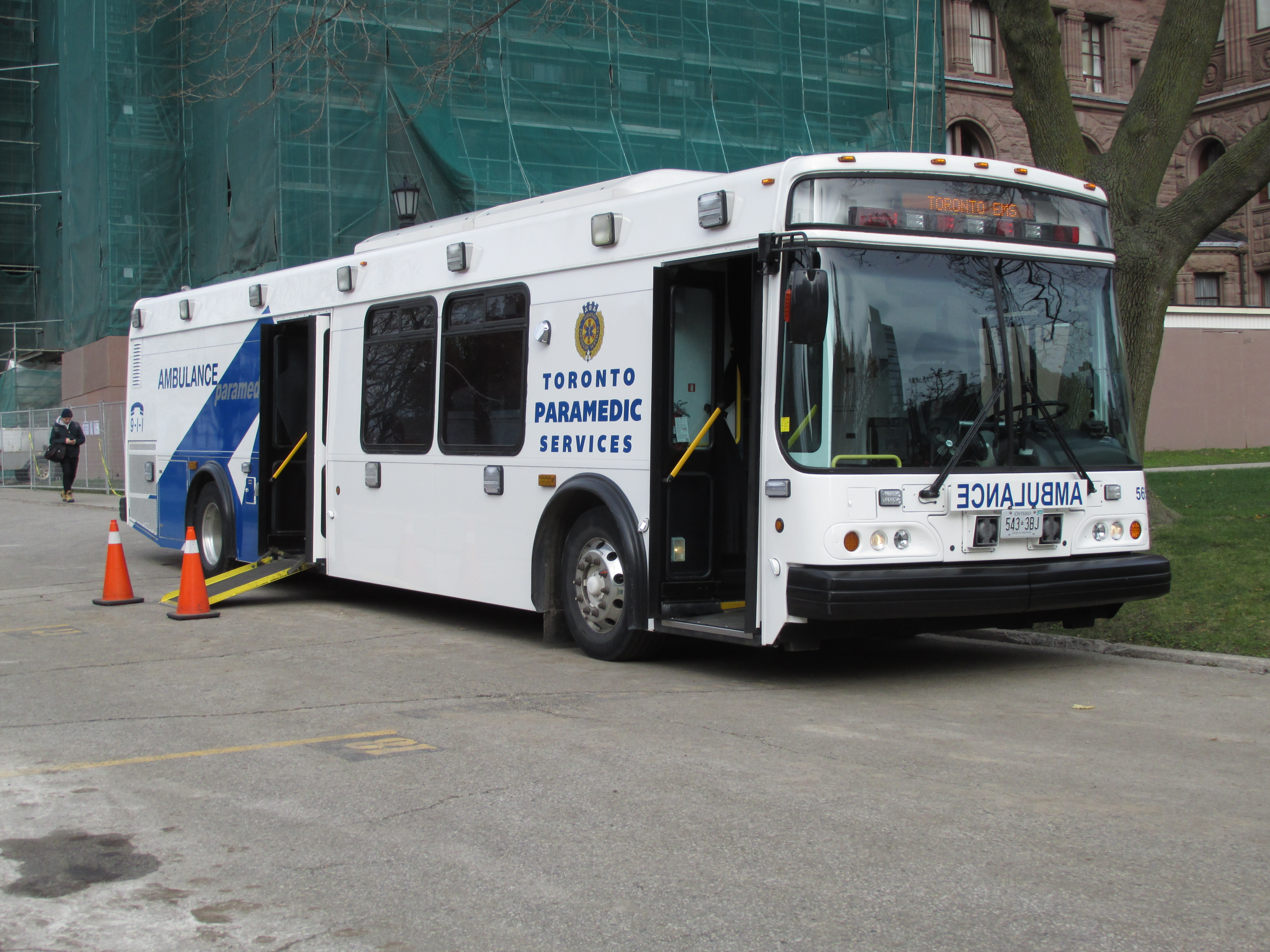
Toronto Paramedic Bus

A paramedic is a healthcare professional, providing pre-hospital assessment and medical care to people with acute illnesses or injuries. In Canada, the title paramedic generally refers to those who work on land ambulances or air ambulances providing paramedic services. Paramedics are increasingly being utilized in hospitals, emergency rooms, clinics and community health care services by providing care in collaboration with registered nurses, registered/licensed practical nurses and registered respiratory therapists.

== Types of paramedics and emergency medical responders ==
In Canada the scope of practice of paramedics and emergency medical responders is described by the National Occupational Competency Profile (NOCP) document which was developed by the Paramedic Association of Canada with financial support from the Government of Canada. The NOCP outlines four provider levels: Emergency Medical Responder (EMR), Primary Care Paramedic (PCP), Advanced Care Paramedic (ACP), and Critical Care Paramedic (CCP).

=== National occupational competency profile (NOCP) ===
There is a considerable degree to inter-provincial variations on paramedic and emergency medical responder practice across Canada. To address this there is a national consensus of paramedic and emergency medical responder practice (by way of the National Occupational Competency Profile) identifies the knowledge, skills, and abilities as being most synonymous with a given level of paramedic or emergency medical responder practice. Each province retains ultimate authority in legislating the actual administration and delivery of paramedicine and its services within its own respective jurisdictions. Specific paramedic regulatory frameworks and practice is established uniquely in each of the provinces legislature and statute and varies across Canada.

Titles of paramedics may vary between provinces. For example, in Ontario, primary care paramedics post the graduation of an approved primary care paramedic education program and upon successful completion of the provincial examination process are awarded the title of Advanced Emergency Medical Care Assistant (AEMCA).

The National Occupational Competency Profile (NOCP) outlines four different competencies. The Competencies in the NOCP are described using a hierarchy of terms: competency area, general competency, specific competency and sub-competency. The framework includes the following eight master categories of paramedics and emergency medical responders: professional responsibilities, communication, health and safety, assessment and diagnostics, therapeutics, integration, transportation and health promotion and public safety.

=== Emergency medical responder (EMR) ===
This is a level of practice recognized under the National Occupational Competency Profile and the Paramedic Association of Canada. EMRs staff rural ambulance stations, patient transfer services, community medical event coverage, industrial ambulances, university campus response teams, or mobile treatment centres. For many small communities, without this level of certification, the operation of a much-needed rural and remote community ambulance services might not be as feasible. EMRs working as first responders in fire departments, police departments and institutions across Canada contribute an important role in the chain of survival. It is a level of practice focused primarily on life saving methods and is generally consistent with fewer acts beyond advanced first-aid. The EMR's scope of practices include oxygen administration, oropharyngeal and nasopharyngeal airway adjuncts, the use and interpretation of a pulse oximeter, use and interpretation of a glucometer, blood pressure assessment by auscultation and palpation, chest auscultation, oropharyngeal airway suctioning, administration of the following oral, sublingual or inhaled medications: anti-anginal, anti-hypoglycemic agent, analgesia, platelet inhibitors (including nitroglycerin, glucose, nitrous oxide, acetylsalicylic acid, salbutamol, intravenous lines without medications or blood products). EMRs may administer naloxone and epinephrine by generally an auto-injector.

Canadian Armed Forces Combat Medics possess this certification, with additional knowledge relating to working in a combat environment, and in surgical assistance.

=== Primary care paramedic (PCP) ===
Primary care paramedics (PCPs) are the entry level of paramedic practice across Canada. The scope of practice includes performing semi-automated external defibrillation, manual defibrillation, oxygen administration, ETCO2 monitoring, supraglottic airways, vascular access, cardiac monitoring such as Lead 2 interpretation and 12 Lead acquisition and interpretation, and administration of Symptom Relief Medications for a variety of emergency medical conditions (these include epinephrine, salbutamol, aspirin, nitroglycerine, naloxone, dextrose, glucagon, gravol, ketorolac, ibuprofen, acetaminophen, benadryl). PCPs may also receive additional authorization in order to perform certain skills that are normally in the scope of practice of ACPs. In some provinces PCP are able to provide pharmacological pain relief for various conditions using narcotics like Fentanyl. PCP scope also has medics carry Benzodiazepines used in treating various conditions like Lorazepam and Midazolam.

=== Advanced care paramedic (ACP) ===
The Advanced Care Paramedic is a level of practitioner that is in high demand by many services across Canada. The ACP typically carries approximately 20 different medications, although the number and type of medications may vary substantially from region to region. ACPs perform advanced airway management including intubation, surgical airways, intravenous therapy, place external jugular IV lines, perform needle thoracostomy, perform and interpret 12-lead ECGs, perform synchronized and chemical cardioversion, transcutaneous pacing, perform obstetrical assessments, and provide pharmacological pain relief for various conditions. Several sites in Canada have adopted pre-hospital fibrinolytics and rapid sequence induction, and prehospital medical research has permitted a great number of variations in the scope of practice for ACPs.

Current bypass protocols include providing both PCPs and ACPs with discretionary direct 24-hour access to PCI labs, bypassing the emergency department, and representing a fundamental change in both the way that patients with S-T segment elevation myocardial infarctions (STEMI) are treated, but also profoundly affecting survival rates. as well as bypassing a closer hospitals to get an identified stroke patient to a stroke centre.

== Paramedicine training overview ==
Paramedic education, or the study of paramedicine in Canada, involves post-secondary education provided by a college or university or similar academic institution. Uniquely some programs may be offered collaboratively and shared between both academic institutions. The education provided is in the theories of paramedicine and its practice and in related subjects areas such as but not limited to anatomy, physiology, psychology, obstetrics, cardiology, pharmacology, pathology, communications, ethics, driving, research, emergency medicine theory and practical skills. Theoretical and practical training is in combination of both in hospital and pre-hospital emergency medicine clinical experiences. The didactic and clinical components of the programs may vary from province to province across Canada.

=== Primary care paramedic training in the western provinces ===
Primary care paramedicine education may be a one year primary care paramedicine certificate to two year primary care paramedicine diploma program in the province of British Columbia, Saskatchewan and Manitoba. Alberta provides a one year primary care paramedicine certificate and a four year baccalaureate paramedicine degree.

=== Primary care paramedicine training in Ontario ===
Ontario requires a two year primary care paramedicine diploma program. A 4-year Bachelor of Science in Paramedicine is offered jointly by the University of Toronto and Centennial College.

=== Primary care paramedicine training in Quebec ===
Paramedicine training in the province of Quebec has been standardized and now requires all new paramedics to hold a three-year Diploma of College Studies in Emergency Prehospital Care, or Soins préhospitaliers d'urgence (SPU) in French, from a recognized CEGEP (college) program. Upon completion of this diploma and successful completion of the provincial examination, one is certified at the level of primary care paramedic (PCP).

=== Primary care paramedicine training in the maritime provinces ===
Nova Scotia, New Brunswick, Newfoundland and Labrador have a two year primary care paramedicine diploma program. Prince Edward Island provides a two year primary care paramedicine diploma program or four year baccalaureate paramedicine degree.

=== Advanced care paramedicine training in Canada ===
Training as an advanced care paramedic (ACP) requires that the student be first registered as a primary care paramedic. The length of time required to complete the ACP graduate program also varies between provinces, and it is generally inversely related to the length of time required to have completed the prerequisite PCP training. Shorter primary care paramedicine programs (around one to two years) would require an additional minimum of two years of advanced care paramedicine graduate study. Graduates of longer primary care paramedicine programs (two to four years) would require an additional minimum of one year of graduate advanced care paramedicine study. In Quebec since 2015, a formal 2-year advanced care paramedic (ACP) training program was developed at Université de Montréal for experienced PCPs from Urgences-santé.

=== University paramedicine training ===
There are four university Bachelor of Science in Paramedicine degree programs currently available in Canada. These programs are increasingly becoming the standard of paramedic education as the profession progresses. This would be comparable to when nursing moved from the college based program to the collaborative or university based program in Canada. These programs are often offered through partnerships between Canadian universities and colleges to enhance theory and practical training with higher education. These programs also allow bridging for registered paramedics to complete the degree program in a shorter, accelerated format. These programs currently are available in Ontario, Alberta and Prince Edward Island.

=== Paramedic education accreditation ===
The accreditation of paramedic educational programs in Canada also varies from province to province. Primarily the regulatory body for paramedicine of their respective provinces reserves the right to approve of paramedic programs. Nationally, Accreditation Canada offers the most comprehensive and best known system of national accreditation for paramedics. Previously, the Canadian Medical Association accredited paramedic training programs. This accreditation model was phased out by the Canadian Medical Association. The CMA only continues to accredit physician and physician assistant education programs. The accreditation model of Accreditation Canada is an independent body, and draws from The national occupational competency profile (NOCP) as the benchmark document that details the knowledge, skills and abilities outcomes that must be possessed by paramedics or EMRs of each respective level of paramedic or EMR practice.

== Specialized paramedics ==
Training for specialization as a paramedic is most often provided by employers who select paramedics that have gone through an internal competition. There are very few specialization education programs open to the public currently. Most specializations require the applicant to already be an experienced advanced care paramedic.

=== Critical care paramedic (CCP) ===
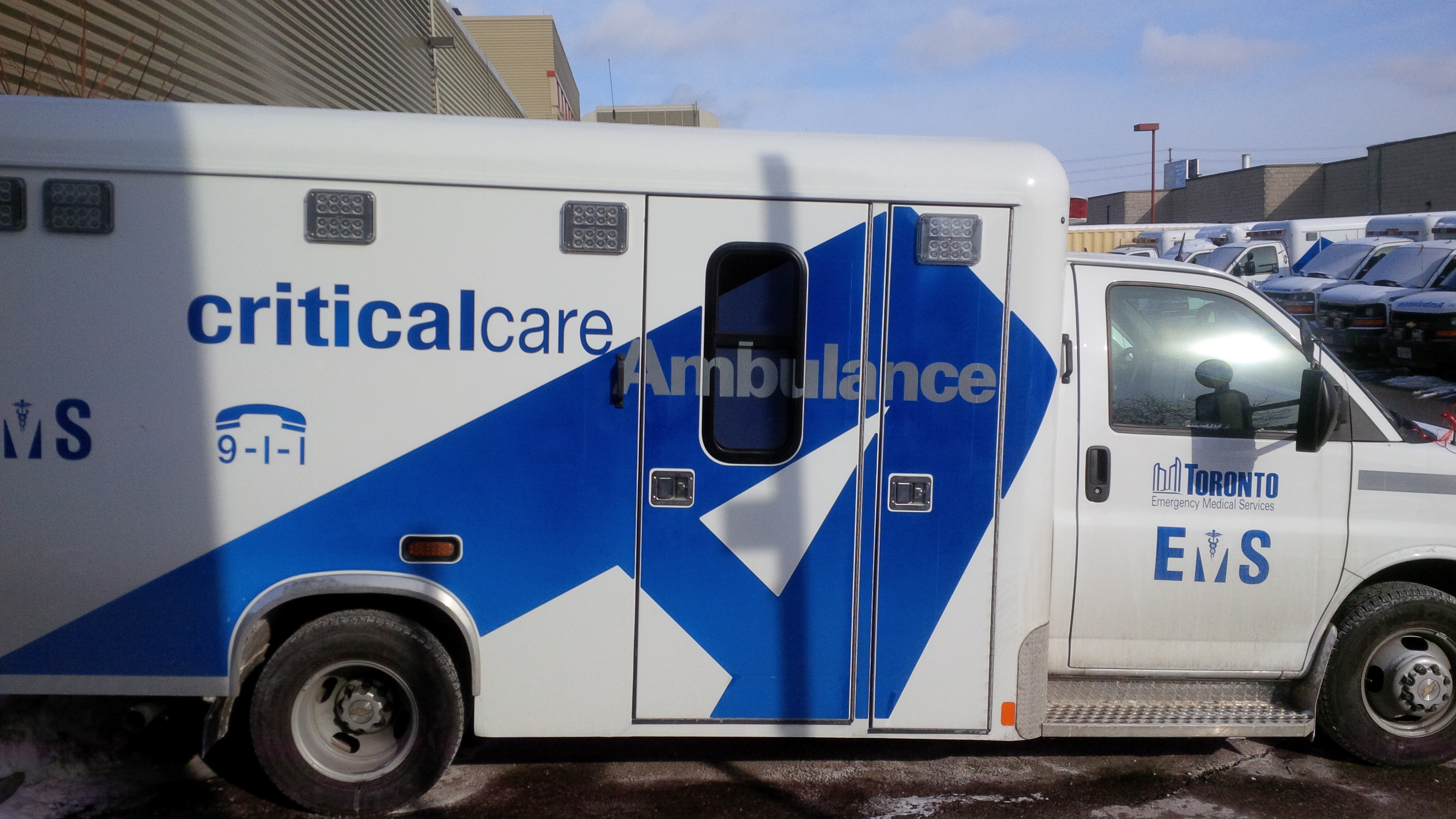
A Critical Care Paramedic ambulance in Toronto

Critical care paramedics' expertise focus on critical and ICU level care, stabilizing and transporting patients from smaller hospitals with less available resources to tertiary care, and regional medical programs in to other hospitals that can provide a higher level of care. CCPs generally work with another CCP, ACP, registered nurse or under the direction of a physician, physician assistant or nurse practitioner. Sometimes ad hoc teams, with multiple practitioners (RTs, emergency physicians, physician assistants, surgeons, etc.) are assembled for certain patients.

CCPs are able to provide all of the care that PCPs and ACPs provide. In addition to this they are trained for other skills such as medication infusion pumps, mechanical ventilation and arterial line monitoring.

CCPs often work in fixed and rotary wing aircraft when the weather permits and staff are available, but systems such as the Toronto EMS Critical Care Transport Program work in land ambulances. ORNGE Transport operates both land and aircraft in Ontario. In British Columbia, CCP's work primarily in aircraft with a dedicated Critical Care Transport crew in several cities for long-distance/high acuity transfers and as regular CCP street crews who may do major trauma calls or, performs medevacs, when necessary.

Across the prairies, STARS Shock Trauma Air Rescue Society uses rotary wing aircraft to reach many in isolated communities and traumatic situations for faster response time than by ground ambulance. In Saskatchewan they also use fixed wing air ambulances. The service, called LIFEGUARD, can respond a greater distance and to more northern communities than STARS. Sask air ambulance service was the first non-military air ambulance service in the world. These air ambulances are crewed by Flight Nurses and CCPs.

=== Tactical paramedic ===
Tactical paramedics are specialized paramedics who undergo additional training to allow them to perform their usual tasks in a high-risk and dangerous scenarios. Some are trained to handle weapons, rappel from buildings, and other skills needed to work alongside tactical police units. These paramedics are required to wear protective gear but are usually unarmed in civilian environments.

Paramedics also exist in the Canadian Armed Forces. They are trained to the same level as their civilian counterparts, with added knowledge for working in combat environments, in CBRNE environments, and in prolonged field settings. They can further specialise into ship-borne medicine, dive medicine, aeromedical evacuation, or working in Special Forces environments. All CAF medics are weapons qualified.

=== Occupational paramedic ===
Occupational paramedic responsibilities may include providing pre-employment screening, medical surveillance services and clinical testing for companies and research institutions. Occupational paramedics may work in a variety of environments including in a clinical setting or in the field including mining sites, oil rigs or other high risk areas. Occupational paramedics may work under the direction of occupational physicians, physician assistants and nurse practitioners. Occupational paramedics may also work collaboratively with registered nurses and registered/licensed practical nurses in the field or may work alone with clinical supports available from electronic means.

=== Community paramedic ===
One of the more recent roles for paramedics in Canada is the community paramedic. These specialized paramedics work in clinics, hospitals, and in patient's homes. They provide immediate or scheduled primary, urgent and specialized healthcare to vulnerable patient populations by collaborating with other healthcare providers, conducting assessments, treating, and doing/ordering tests. Diagnostics provided by community paramedics include: specimen collection (blood, urine, swabs), electrocardiogram interpretation, vital signs, and facilitate transports for diagnostic imaging. Treatments provided by community paramedics include: fluid rehydration, blood transfusions, urinary catheterization, wound closure & care (tissue adhesive, sutures, dressings), oxygen and nebulizer therapy, medication administration, and coordination of community services. In Saskatchewan, paramedics may become endorsed as community paramedics by the Saskatchewan College of Paramedics upon the completion of an accredited community paramedicine program.

=== Incident response paramedic ===
Incident response paramedics receive intensive training, including toxicology, hazmat chemistry, National Fire Protection Association hazmat awareness and operations certifications, as well as three weeks of CBRNE training, antidote, medical countermeasures, MCI, and protective equipment training. For day-to-day operations, incident response paramedics respond to hazmat- and toxicology-related incidents. These paramedics may carry a unique range of medications than and more protective equipment, allowing them to better treat poisonings/overdoses and work closely with firefighters and hazmat technicians.

== Regulation of the paramedicine profession ==
Paramedics across Canada have various formats for regulation. Paramedics in all provinces are regulated by provincial legislation and regulations directly by government, or rather by a designated regulatory college where each paramedic regardless of level has an independent license to practice and is solely responsible for their paramedic practice. These organizations are responsible to the government for the examination and licensing of paramedics, the establishment of standards of practice, the investigation of public complaints against members, and the disciplining of members. They are also required to advise the government on all issues and legislation related to the practice of their members. Many Canadian paramedics are currently advocating to empower government to work towards becoming a self-regulated health profession. Paramedics are forming their own professional regulatory college in much of the same manner as physicians, nurses, respiratory therapists and other health professions.

=== New Brunswick paramedic regulation ===
In the province of New Brunswick, paramedics are regulated by the Paramedic Association of New Brunswick.

=== Nova Scotia paramedic regulation ===
In the province of Nova Scotia, paramedics are regulated by the College of Paramedics of Nova Scotia.

=== Saskatchewan paramedic regulation ===
In the province of Saskatchewan, paramedics are regulated by the Saskatchewan College of Paramedics.

=== Manitoba paramedic regulation ===
In the province of Manitoba, paramedics are regulated by the College of Paramedics of Manitoba.

=== Alberta paramedic regulation ===
In the province of Alberta, paramedics and emergency medical responders are regulated by the Alberta College of Paramedics.

=== Ontario paramedic regulation ===
In Ontario, paramedics are regulated through two mechanisms in which the Ambulance Act indirectly regulates paramedicine. The Ministry of Health, Emergency Health Services Branch, credentials successful graduates of paramedic programs which have completed the provincial paramedic examination as maintained and administered by the ministry. The ministry can also revoke paramedic credentials from currently practising paramedics. The ministry additionally maintains the provincial standards and medical directives expected of all paramedics in Ontario. The second mechanism of regulation is by a designated base hospital which grants paramedics the legal authority to practice. Paramedics are permitted to perform controlled medical acts by the process of 'delegation'. This means that one physician, known as the medical director, has become familiar with the individual paramedic and then has delegated authority to that paramedic which allows them to perform specific regulated medical act under defined situations. The scope of practice for the paramedic is defined in paramedic protocols established by the Ministry of Health (also referred to as medical directives). These directives specify which skill and the conditions required for the paramedic to act. Each directive is signed by the medical director. Medical directors are generally emergency medicine specialized physicians who work in a hospital associated with the paramedic service. The relationship between this hospital ('Base Hospital') is formalized through legal agreements. Other physicians in the base hospital who are allowed to give direct orders to paramedics that exceed their protocols (often via telephone) are referred to as delegating physicians. These physicians are usually emergency medicine specialized physicians. In Ontario, paramedics are actively advocating for some form of self-regulation to remove the multiple layers and complexities of regulation and paramedic practice.

=== British Columbia paramedic regulation ===
In British Columbia, The Emergency Health Services Act directly regulates paramedicine. This act requires emergency medical assistants (paramedics) working in British Columbia to be licensed by the Emergency Medical Assistants Licensing Board. Paramedics hold their own licenses under the authority of the Board. The Government of British Columbia has prioritized the review of paramedics for self-regulation under the Health Professions Act through modernization of the provincial health profession regulatory framework.

=== Prince Edward Island paramedic regulation ===
In the province of Prince Edward Island, paramedics are regulated by the College of Paramedicine of Prince Edward Island.

=== Newfoundland and Labrador paramedic regulation ===
In Newfoundland and Labrador, paramedics are regulated through the Newfoundland and Labrador Paramedicine Regulator and must have active medical authorization from the Office of the Provincial Medical Director. The Office provides paramedics with the ability to perform controlled medical acts while working within the public ambulance program.

=== Quebec paramedic regulation ===
In Quebec, paramedics are directly regulated by the Ministry of Health & Social Services, established by the Pre-Hospital Emergency Services Act.

== Professional environment ==
In some localities in Canada, paramedics may work under the direction of physicians, physician assistants and nurse practitioners in various emergency or related hospital departments. Collaborative emergency centres (CECs), collaborative care clinics, and community health centres in rural regions of Nova Scotia currently utilize this model. In these centres, paramedics and nurses work together as a patient-centred team to assess and treat patients without a physician or physician assistant on-site. The paramedic and nurse consult with a provider over the phone for particular patients, and the three disciplines work together to develop a care plan for the patient. This care plan might involve treating the patient that night and then have the patient come back the next day to follow-up with a provider. If the patient needs urgent care that cannot be provided at the CEC, the patient can be transferred by ambulance to the closest regional facility. A paramedic working in a CEC may be a Primary Care Paramedic or Advanced Care Paramedic.

Paramedics often work long hours; with a variety of 8-, 10-, 12- and 14-hour shifts. In some areas, however, 24- and even 96-hour shifts are not unusual. Salary and benefits are generally commensurate with the level of education and certification, though often less than the salary expectations of police officers and firefighters. This incongruity is often argued as being unfair, especially in light of the relative level of responsibility a paramedic may have for acting decisively and without having direct supervision. However, many paramedics consider their career to offer intangible benefits and reported job satisfaction is generally high. Due to the challenging working conditions, paramedics, similarly to other first responders, are at a greatly increased risk to develop Post-Traumatic Stress Disorder as compared to the general population.

Paramedics in Canada generally work only as paramedics, but occasionally are cross-trained as firefighters, security contractor, search and rescue or law enforcement officers, and most are paid full or part-time professionals. In the first quarter of 2005, paramedics were granted status federally as a "Public Safety Occupation" which means that paramedics are now eligible for early retirement, as are police officers and fire fighters. Many paramedic services provide a full range of paramedic specialty squads including: Marine medics, Bike medics, First Response medics, Tactical ERT & CCU medics, CBRNe medics (Chemical, Biological, Radiological, Nuclear and Explosive) and USAR medics (Urban Search And Rescue - specializing in urban disaster rescue recovery) and finally NOHERT medics (members of Provincial or regional Health Emergency Response Teams)

== See also ==
- Emergency Medical Services in Canada
- List of EMS Services in Ontario
- Shock Trauma Air Rescue Society
- Saskatchewan Air Ambulance
