= Paramedicine =

Healthcare profession based on practice outside of hospitals

Paramedicine is a healthcare profession concerned with the assessment, treatment, and care of people experiencing acute illness, injury, or other urgent health needs in a wide range of out-of-hospital and related settings. It has developed internationally from a vocation based solely around pre-hospital emergency response into an autonomous profession with a broad scope of evidence-based practice.

Paramedics work across emergency, urgent, primary and community care, and may also hold non-clinical roles in education, leadership, research, public health and system development.

Although the organisation and regulation of paramedicine vary across countries, international consensus recognises several shared features: paramedicine forms an essential component of modern healthcare systems; paramedics possess complex clinical knowledge and skills enabling them to practise safely in unscheduled, unpredictable or dynamic environments; and depending on jurisdiction, they may practise under medical direction from physicians or as independent clinicians.

The terminology used to describe paramedicine and its practitioners differs internationally and includes terms such as ambulance services, emergency medical services (EMS), paramedic, and emergency medical technician (EMT), among others. This variation in nomenclature reflects historical and jurisdictional differences but broadly refers to elements of the same professional domain.

In many countries, such as Australia, Canada, New Zealand, South Africa, the United Kingdom and parts of Europe, paramedics are statutorily regulated and practise as autonomous clinicians under their own licence. In other systems, including parts of the United States and Asia, paramedic practice commonly occurs under medical oversight as part of an EMS model. These differences represent local regulatory, operational and educational models.

== Profession ==
A health profession focused on assisting individuals, families, and communities in the wake of acute or sudden onset of medical emergencies or traumatic events, paramedicine is practiced predominantly in the prehospital setting and is based on the sciences of human anatomy, physiology, and pathophysiology. The goal of paramedicine is to promote optimal quality of life from birth to end of life.

In the United States, such regulated tasks as starting an IV, administering medication, and invasive procedures are performed under the direction of a licensed physician. In the United Kingdom, paramedics practice as independent clinicians under their own licence, as regulated by the Health and Care Professions Council, with complete autonomy to pronounce death, administer controlled drugs, and generally treat patients as they see fit.

== Theory ==
Paramedicine is based on the emerging concept of paramedic theory, which is the study and analysis of how the three pillars of paramedicine (health care and medicine, public health, and public safety) interact and intersect. As stated in the IoM Report EMS at the Crossroads (2006), EMS is currently highly fragmented and largely separated from the overall health care system. A major emphasis of paramedic theory is the integration of emergency medical services, both intraprofessionally and extraprofessionally. Intraprofessional integration is the study of resource allocation, distribution, deployment and efficiency. Extraprofessional study involves the integration of EMS with the nation's existing (and future) emergency care and health care system.

Other areas of inquiry in paramedic theory include emergency response, response planning, community education, transport medicine, disaster preparedness and response, emergency management, pandemic and epidemic, emergency response planning, special operations, and medical aspects of rescue.

== See also ==
- Allied health professions
- Alternative medicine
- Emergency medical services in the United States
- Emergency medical personnel in the United Kingdom
- Health science
- Paramedics in Australia
- Paramedics in Canada
- Paramedics in the United States
