= Albuquerque Fire Rescue =

Operational area
- Country: United States
- State: New Mexico
- City: Albuquerque

Agency overview
- Established: 1900
- Annual calls: 90,208 (2020)
- Employees: 773 (2020)
- Annual budget: $99 million (2021)
- Staffing: Career
- Fire chief: Gene Gallegos (interim)
- EMS level: ALS
- IAFF: 244

Facilities and equipment
- Battalions: 4
- Stations: 22
- Engines: 22 frontline, 8 reserve
- Trucks: 5 frontline, 2 reserve
- Platforms: 2
- Rescues: 1
- Ambulances: 20 frontline, 7 reserve
- HAZMAT: 2
- Wildland: 1 Type 1, 1 Type 3, 5 Type 6

Website
- Official website

Albuquerque Fire Rescue (AFR) is the municipal fire department serving Albuquerque, New Mexico, United States. It is the largest fire department in New Mexico with 22 fire stations and 729 paid firefighters as of 2020. In 2019, AFR ranked as the 25th-busiest fire department in the United States, fielding 105,526 calls for emergency services, and the department's Engine 5 was the nation's 12th-busiest fire engine with 5,532 runs.

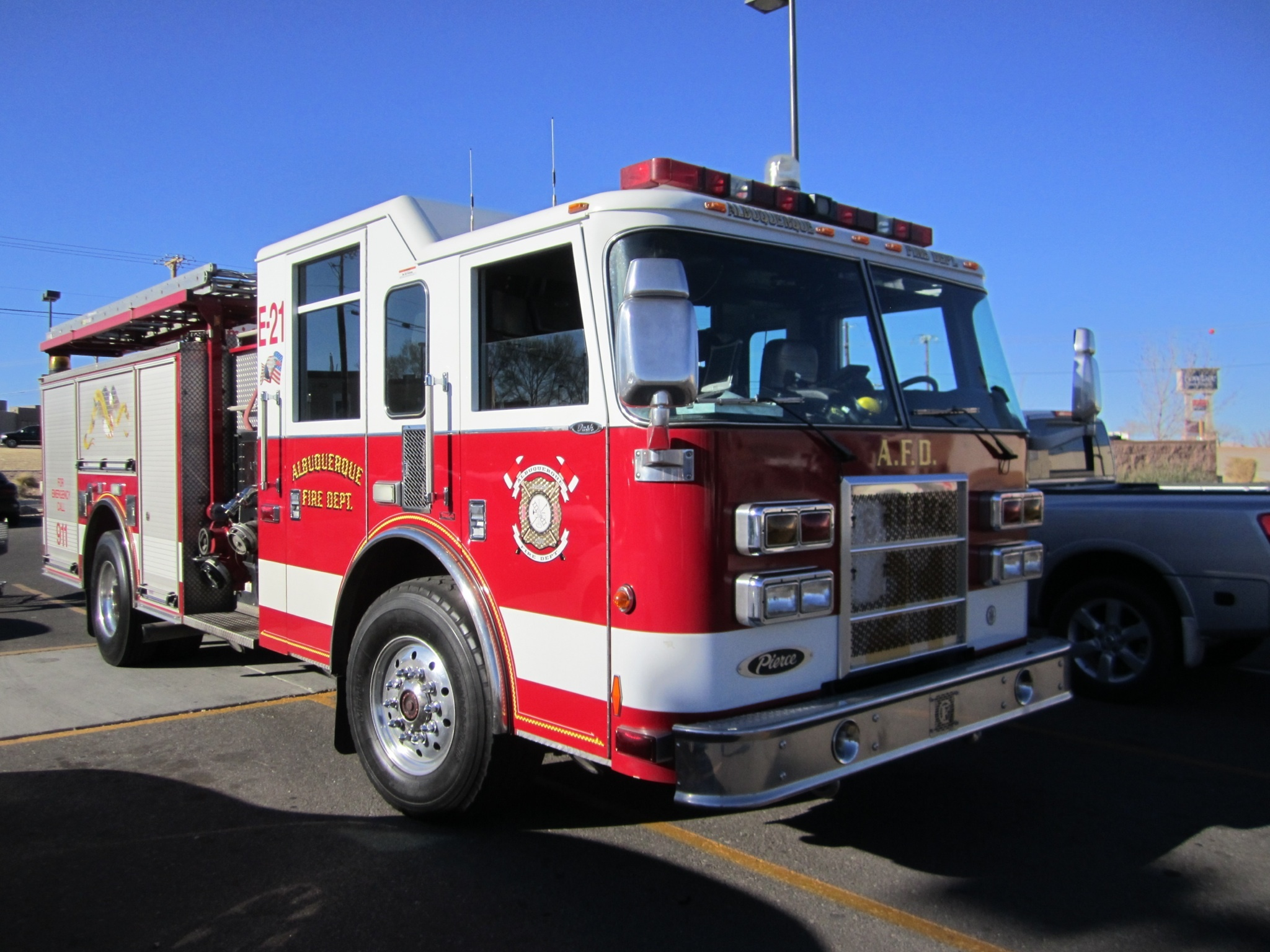
AFR Engine 21 in 2012

AFR provides both fire and emergency medical services, including two hazardous materials squads and one heavy technical rescue squad with vehicle extrication, confined space, rope, structural collapse, trench collapse, swift water, and elevator rescue capabilities.

The Albuquerque Fire Department was originally established in 1900, replacing an earlier volunteer fire department. It was renamed Albuquerque Fire Rescue in 2018 in order to acknowledge the wider scope of duties handled by the department.

AFR has fielded an ambulance that is capable of initiating pre-hospital Extracorporeal membrane oxygenation.
