= Urban Search and Rescue Virginia Task Force 2 =

FEMA Urban Search and Rescue Task Forces

Urban Search and Rescue Virginia Task Force 2 (VA-TF2) is one of the 28 FEMA Urban Search and Rescue Task Forces. Based in Virginia Beach, VA-TF2 is sponsored by the Virginia Beach Fire Department.

The department has two heavy rescue apparatus fitted with specialized equipment designed for technical rescue incidents. The VBFD Technical Rescue Team is trained to meet NFPA 1670 Technician Level standards.

== Deployments ==
VA-TF2 has taken part in the following deployments:

- Tornado outbreak - Petersburg, Virginia (August 1993)
- Hurricane Opal - Fort Walton Beach, Florida (October 1995)
- Oklahoma City bombing - Oklahoma City, Oklahoma (April 1995)
- Summer Olympics - Atlanta, Georgia (July 1996)
- Hurricane Fran - Carolina Coast, South Carolina (September 1996)
- Hurricane Georges - Florida Panhandle; Gulf of Mexico (September 1998)
- Pentagon Attack - Arlington, Virginia (September 2001)
- Winter Olympics - Salt Lake City, Utah (February 2002)
- Hurricane Frances - Jacksonville, Florida (September 2004)
- Hurricane Ivan - Orange Beach, Florida (September 2004)
- Hurricane Katrina I - Waveland, Mississippi (August 2005)
- Hurricane Katrina II - New Orleans, Louisiana (September 2005)
- Hurricane Rita - Dallas, Texas (September 2005)
- Hurricane Ernesto - Jacksonville, Florida (August 2006)
- Hurricane Gustav - Houston, Texas (August 2008)
- Hurricane Ike - Houston, Texas (August/September 2008)
- Tropical Storm Omar - (Activation Only)
- 2009 Presidential Inauguration - Washington, DC (Activation Only) (August 2009)
- Haiti earthquake - Port-Au-Prince, Haiti (January 2010)
- Hurricane Irene - Virginia Beach, Virginia; Lakehurst, New Jersey (August 2011)
- Hurricane Sandy - New York City, New York (October 2012)
- Hurricane Joaquin - Columbia, South Carolina (October 2015)
- Hurricane Matthew - Florida (October 2016)
- Hurricane Harvey - Houston, Texas (August 2017)
- Hurricane Irma - San Juan, Puerto Rico; US Virgin Islands (September 2017)
- Hurricane Maria - San Juan, Puerto Rico (September 2017)
- Hurricane Florence - Virginia; North Carolina; South Carolina (September 2018)
- Hurricane Michael - Florida (October 2018)
- Hurricane Dorian - Florida (August 2019)
- Champlain Towers Collapse - Surfside, Florida (June 2021)
- Hurricane Henri - Beverly, Massachusetts (August 2021)
- Hurricane Ida - Hammond, Louisiana; East Brunswick, New Jersey (August 2021)
- 2022 Kentucky Flooding - Hazard, Kentucky (July 2022)
- Hurricane Ian - Charlotte County, Florida; Lee County, Florida (September 2022)
- Vermont Flooding - Vermont (July 2023)
- Hurricane Idalia - Orlando, Florida (August 2023)
- Hurricane Debby - Berkeley County, South Carolina (August 2024)
