= Virginia Beach Fire Department =

Emergency services in Virginia, US

Coordinates: 36°45′2.4″N 76°3′17.4″W

Operational area
- Country: United States
- State: Virginia
- City: Virginia Beach

Agency overview
- Established: January 1, 1963
- Annual calls: 46,075 (2016)
- Employees: 526 (2022)
- Annual budget: $44,772,337 (2013)
- Staffing: Career
- Fire chief: Kenneth Pravetz
- EMS level: ALS and BLS
- IAFF: 2924

Facilities and equipment
- Battalions: 5
- Stations: 21
- Engines: 22
- Trucks: 9
- Rescues: 2
- Tenders: 3
- HAZMAT: 2
- Wildland: 8
- Fireboats: 3
- Light and air: 1

Website
- Official website

The Virginia Beach Fire Department (VBFD) provides fire protection and emergency medical services to the city of Virginia Beach, Virginia. The department protects an area of 249 square miles (640 km^{2}) as well as 59 square miles (150 km^{2}) of inland waterways and 38 miles (61 km) of shoreline. The independent city is home to a population of 450,882, not including the summer population growth due to tourism, making it the most populous city in Virginia and the 39th largest city in the United States.

== Operations ==
=== USAR Task Force 2 ===
The Virginia Beach Fire Department is the founding member of one of Virginia's two FEMA Urban Search and Rescue Task Force. Virginia Task Force 2 (VA-TF2) is available to respond to natural or man-made disasters around the country and the world to assist with search and rescue, medical support, damage assessment and communications.

=== Marine Operations ===
The VBFD Marine Operations Team is responsible for patrolling 59 square miles (150 km^{2}) of inland waterways as well as 38 miles (61 km) of shoreline. The team also provides mutual aid to parts of North Carolina as well as the U.S. Coast Guard. The operations team has three fireboats at their disposal:

- Fireboat 1 is a 30-foot (9.1 m) Argus Class Northwind with an enclosed cabin and a 1,500-US-gallon-per-minute (0.095 m^{3}/s) pump docked in Lynnhaven Inlet.:
- Fireboat 6 is a 24-foot (7.3 m) Metal Shark aluminum response vessel with a 500-US-gallon-per-minute (0.032 m^{3}/s) pump docked at Station 6 in Creeds.
- Fireboat 12 is a former USCG 41-foot (12 m) utility boat that is designed to operate under rough weather and sea conditions where its speed and maneuverability make it an ideal platform. It is kept at the City Dredge Ops marina located in Owls Creek.

== Stations and Apparatus ==
Fire Station Number	Station	Engine Company	Ladder Company	Brush Unit	Command Unit	Other Units
1	First Landing	Engine 1	Ladder 1			Fireboat 1
2	Davis Corner	Engine 2	Ladder 2	Brush 2		
3	London Bridge	Engine 3				Rescue 1, HazMat 1, Safety 1
4	Chesapeake Beach	Engine 4			Battalion 2	PAC 1
5	Courthouse	Engine 5		Brush 5		Tanker 5
6	Creeds	Engine 6		Brush 6		Tanker 6, Fireboat 6
7	Town Center	Engine 7	Ladder 7		District Chief	Rescue 2, Tech 1
8	Oceana	Engine 8	Ladder 8	Brush 8		ATV 8, Support 8
9	Kempsville	Engine 9		Brush 9	Battalion 5	
10	Woodstock	Engine 10	Ladder 10			
11	Beach Borough	Engine 11; Engine 14	Ladder 11		Battalion 1	
12	Seatack	Engine 12				Fireboat 12
13	Blackwater	Engine 13		Brush 13		Tanker 13
15	Fort Story	Engine 15				
16	Plaza	Engine 16	Ladder 16			
17	Sandbridge	Engine 17		Brush 17		
18	Green Run	Engine 18			Battalion 3	
19	Stumpy Lake	Engine 19		Brush 19		
20	Little Neck	Engine 20				Command 1
21	General Booth	Engine 21	Ladder 21		Battalion 4	MCI Bus
22	Burton Station	Engine 22	Ladder 22	-		
