= Trench shoring =

Process for preventing the collapse of trenches

Trench shoring is a method of collapse protection that involves the bracing of the walls of a trench to prevent collapse and cave-ins. It is commonly used in industrial and construction applications where below grade work is necessary, such as pipelines, stormwater drainage, and communication lines. Trench shoring should only be performed by trained personnel, and in some instances must be designed and approved by an engineer. The phrase can also be used as a noun to refer to the materials used in the process. Shoring should not be confused with shielding by means of trench shields, shoring is designed to prevent collapse, whilst shielding is only designed to protect workers should collapse occur. In the United States trench shoring is regulated by OSHA 29 CFR 1926.650, 29 CFR 1926.651, and 29 CFR 1926.652.

== Components of Trench Shoring ==
Traditional trench shoring involves three main components: sheeting, struts and whalers. The sheeting is the panels used to support directly against the walls of the trench. These are commonly made out of metal plate, or a special type of sheeting known as Finland form, or finforms. Finforms is a plywood made of 14-ply artic white birch, known to be extreme strong and durable. Some trench sheets have a rigid center support along their length, known a strongback, this allows for the struts to transfer the force evenly along the length of the sheeting. Struts are the horizontal members that put compressive lateral force against the sheeting, stabilizing the walls. These struts can be hydraulic, pneumatic, or screw jacks, depending on the use of the trench and the resources available. Some applications call for the use of walers, which are long rails that span between sheeting are supported by the struts. Walers allow for a safe work zone to be created without struts intruding into the space.

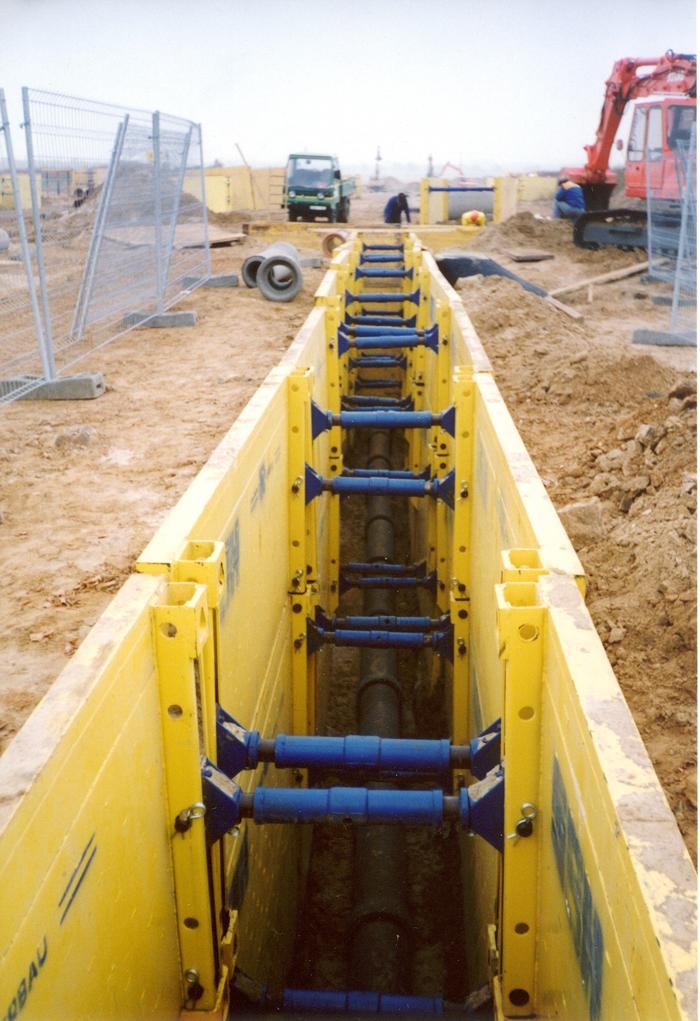
Hydraulic Shoring.

== Methods of Trench Shoring ==
Hydraulic shoring is one of the most common methods utilized in construction applications today. This method utilizes hydraulic cylinder as the struts, powered by a hydraulic pump moving fluid into the cylinder, generating the force against the sheeting and into the walls of the trench. By utilizing hydraulics, the trench can be shored consistently and evenly across its length, as well as pressures can be monitored ensuring appropriate pressure is applied. This minimizes any uneven stress forces along the length of the trench, which can minimize the shift in soil. Often these systems are assembled outside of the trench and lowered in with equipment, and require nearly vertical trench walls and stable soil conditions.

Pneumatic shoring operates similarly to hydraulic; however it utilizes air to push the struts as opposed to fluid. The struts are engaged with air pressure, pressurized to an appropriate pressure, and locked in place with a screw type collar. This provides a solid shore and can be built in the trench regardless of wall and soil conditions. This method is commonly used by trench rescue personnel as it can be rapidly deployed without additional equipment, and can be assembled without placing personnel in the unstable trench.

Screw jacks are cost effective, and a low tech method of trench shoring where a manual screw jack is used to provide the force on the trench walls. This method is rarely used in modern days as it requires personnel to be in the trench to torque the jacks, and there is no method to accurately check the force being applied to the sheeting.

Timber shoring is a method which utilizes wooden timbers to shore the trench. This method is rarely used in modern industry due to the complexity and risk involved. Timber shoring requires cutting timbers as wide as 8x8in to length and wedging them in place. This requires personnel to enter the unprotected trench, and much like the screw jacks has no method of accurately checking the force applied to the sheeting.

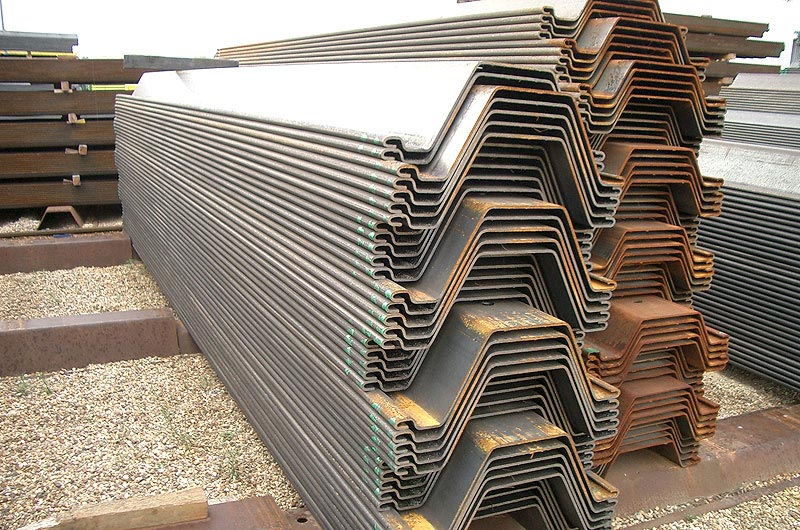
Sheet piling

Unrestrained shoring systems are a method of shoring that does not involve any horizontal struts. Due to the lack of supports, these methods can only be utilized to a specific engineered depth. Urestrained shoring is done via two methods, soldier piles and sheet piles. Soldier piles involves a H-beam pressed into the soil at a depth determined by an engineer, and sheeting or boards placed between the slots created by the beams. The other method is known as sheet piling, where interlocking steel sheets are driven into the soil. Both create strong shoring, as long as the soil remains stable

== See also ==
- Retaining wall
- Trench Shield
