= Retaining wall =

Artificial wall used for supporting soil between two different elevations

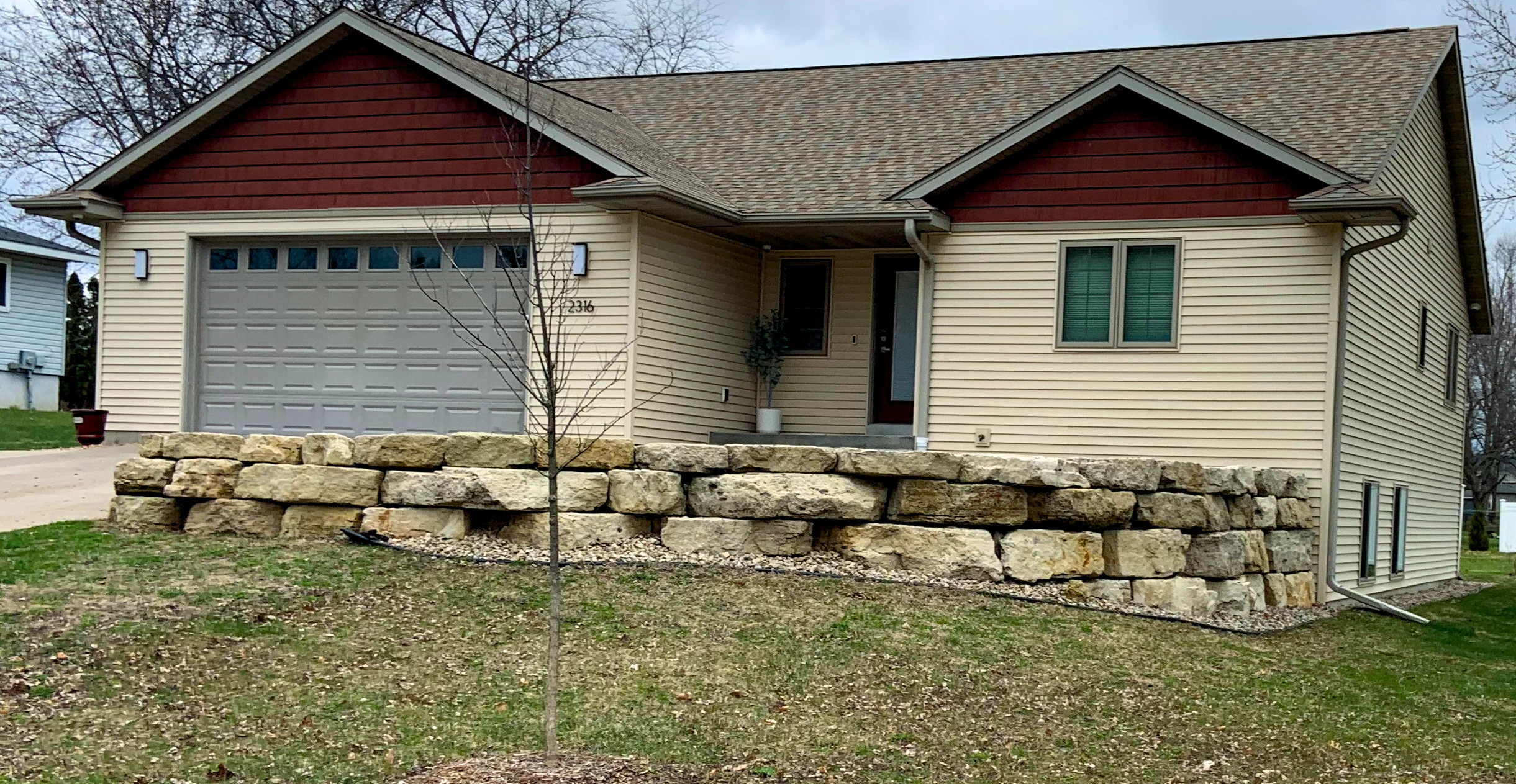
Retaining wall of boulders with sawn tops and bottoms

A gravity-type stone retaining wall

Retaining walls are relatively rigid walls used for supporting soil laterally so that it can be retained at different levels on the two sides. Retaining walls are structures designed to restrain soil to a slope that it would not naturally keep to (typically a steep, near-vertical or vertical slope). They are used to bound soils between two different elevations often in areas of inconveniently steep terrain in areas where the landscape needs to be shaped severely and engineered for more specific purposes like hillside farming or roadway overpasses. A retaining wall that retains soil on the backside and water on the frontside is called a seawall or a bulkhead.

== Definition ==
A retaining wall is designed to hold in place a mass of earth or the like, such as the edge of a terrace or excavation. The structure is constructed to resist the lateral pressure of soil when there is a desired change in ground elevation that exceeds the angle of repose of the soil.

A basement wall is thus one kind of retaining wall; however, the term usually refers to a cantilever retaining wall, which is a freestanding structure without lateral support at its top. These are cantilevered from a footing and rise above the grade on one side to retain a higher level grade on the opposite side. The walls must resist the lateral pressures generated by loose soils or, in some cases, water pressures.

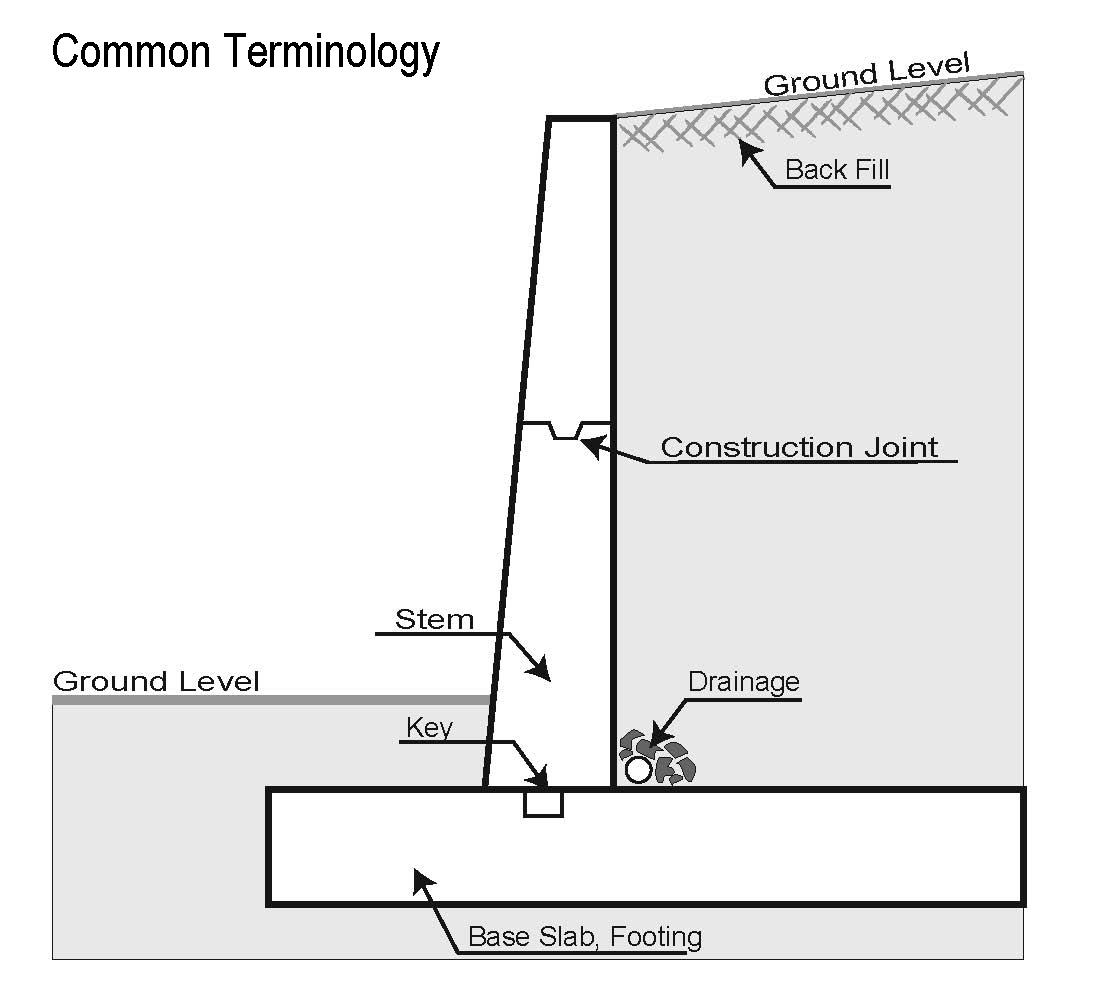

Every retaining wall supports a "wedge" of soil. The wedge is defined as the soil which extends beyond the failure plane of the soil type present at the wall site, and can be calculated once the soil friction angle is known. As the setback of the wall increases, the size of the sliding wedge is reduced. This reduction lowers the pressure on the retaining wall.

The most important consideration in proper design and installation of retaining walls is to recognize and counteract the tendency of the retained material to move downslope due to gravity. This creates lateral earth pressure behind the wall which depends on the angle of internal friction (phi) and the cohesive strength (c) of the retained material, as well as the direction and magnitude of movement the retaining structure undergoes.

Lateral earth pressures are zero at the top of the wall and – in homogeneous ground – increase proportionally to a maximum value at the lowest depth. Earth pressures will push the wall forward or overturn it if not properly addressed. Also, any groundwater behind the wall that is not dissipated by a drainage system causes hydrostatic pressure on the wall. The total pressure or thrust may be assumed to act at one-third from the lowest depth for lengthwise stretches of uniform height.

It is important to have proper drainage behind the wall in order to limit the pressure to the wall's design value. Drainage materials will reduce or eliminate the hydrostatic pressure and improve the stability of the material behind the wall. Drystone retaining walls are normally self-draining.

As an example, the International Building Code requires retaining walls to be designed to ensure stability against overturning, sliding, excessive foundation pressure and water uplift; and that they be designed for a safety factor of 1.5 against lateral sliding and overturning.

== Types ==
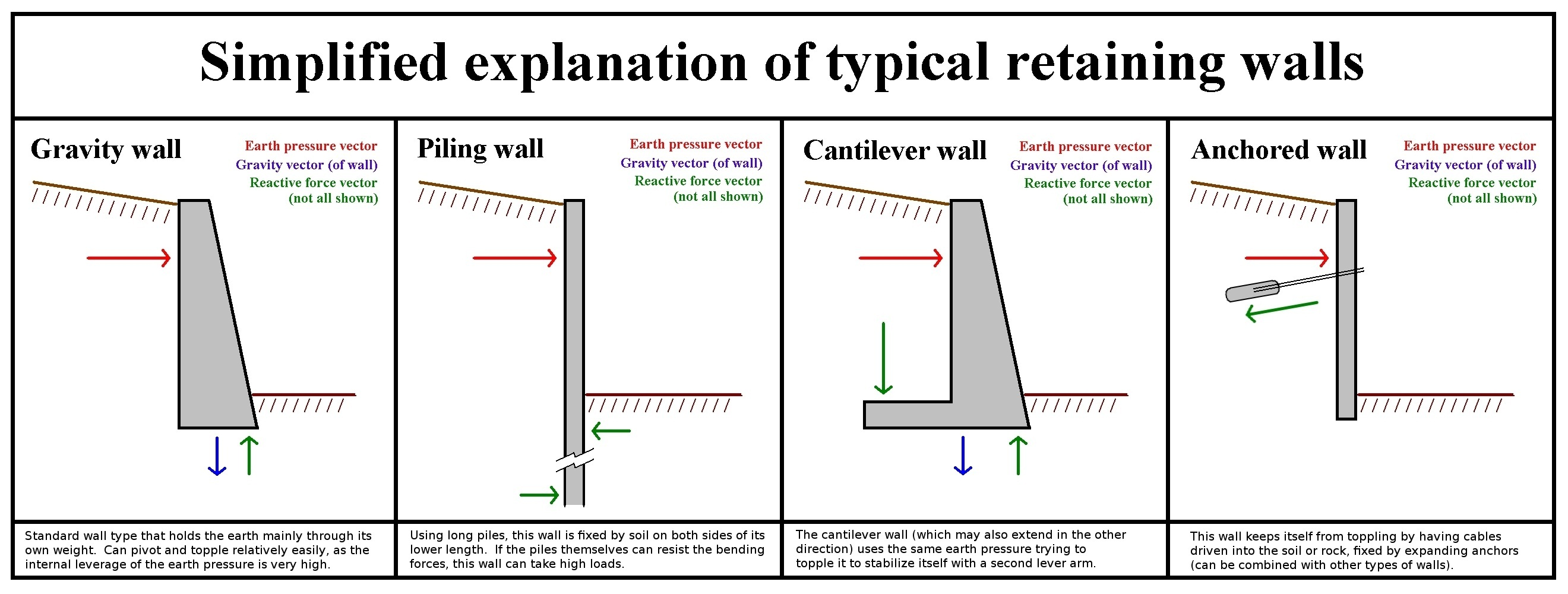
Various types of retaining walls

=== Gravity ===
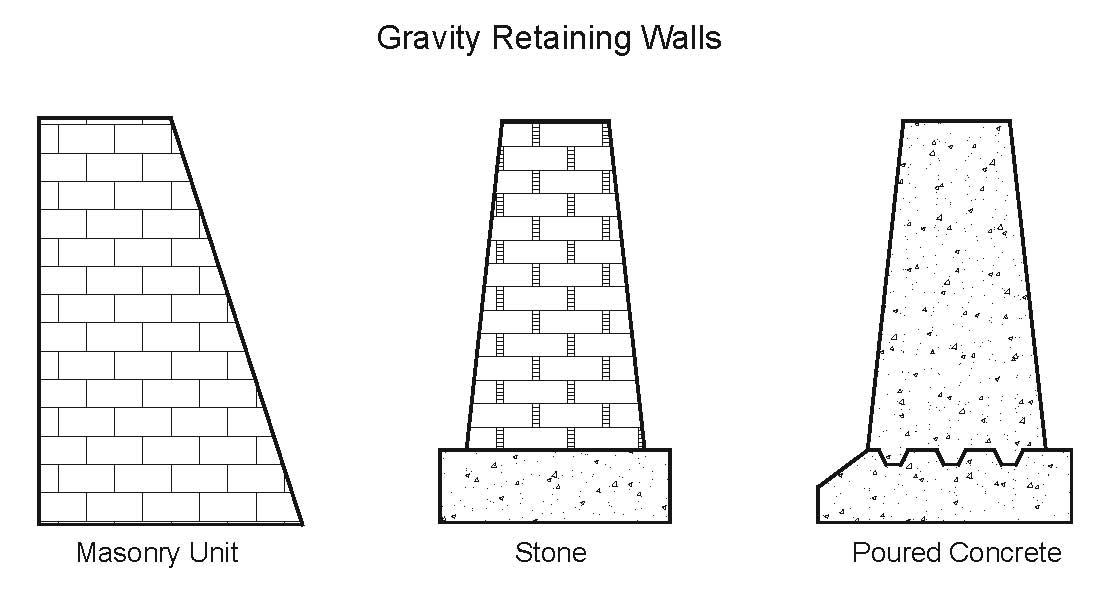
Construction types of gravity retaining walls

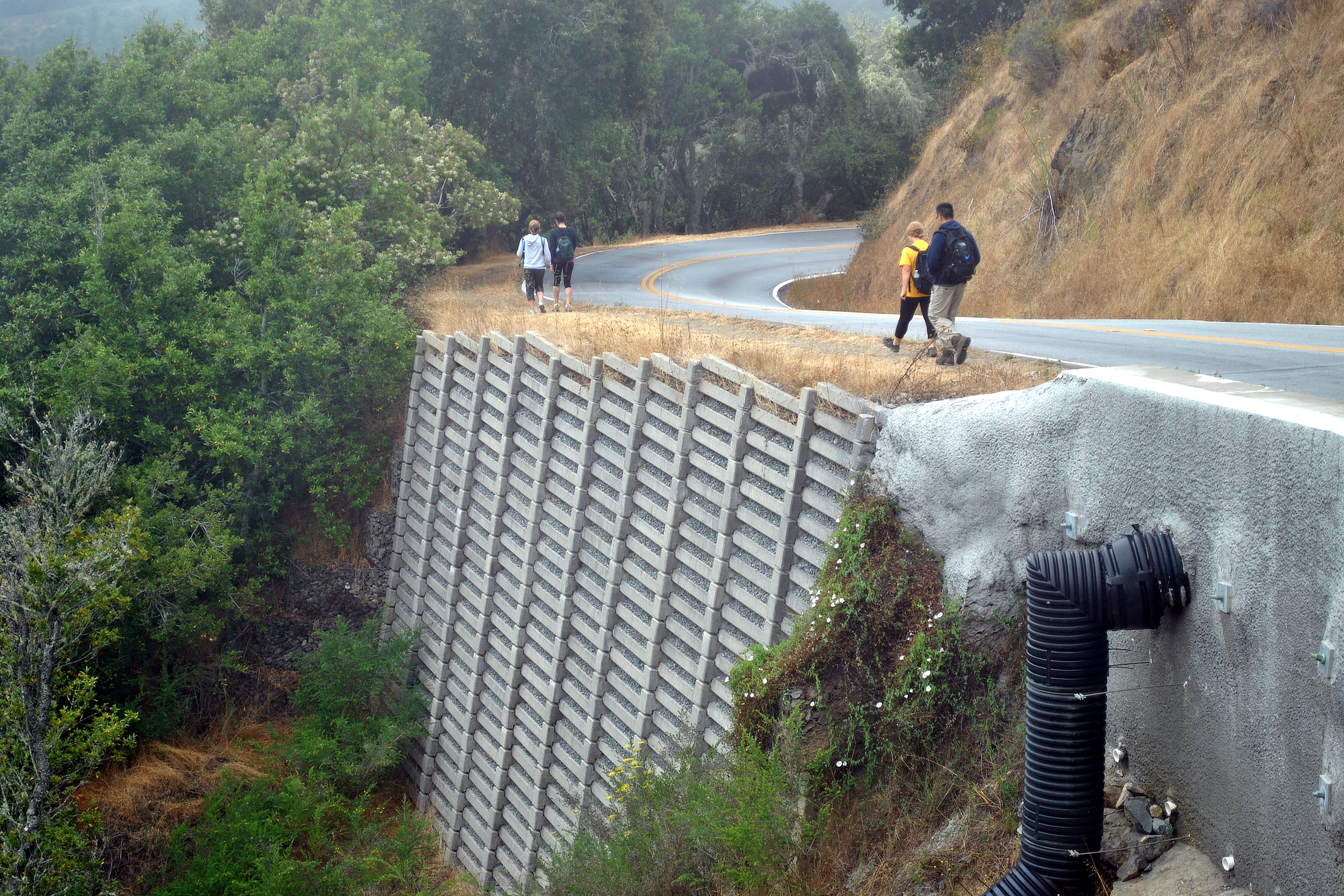
An example of crib wall

Gravity walls depend on their mass (stone, concrete or other heavy material) to resist pressure from behind and may have a 'batter' setback to improve stability by leaning back toward the retained soil. For short landscaping walls, they are often made from mortarless stone or segmental concrete units (masonry units). Dry-stacked gravity walls are somewhat flexible and do not require a rigid footing. They can be built to a low height without additional materials being inserted, and have concrete added for strength and stability.

Earlier in the 20th century, taller retaining walls were often gravity walls made from large masses of concrete or stone. Today, taller retaining walls are increasingly built as composite gravity walls such as: geosynthetics such as geocell cellular confinement earth retention or with precast facing; gabions (stacked steel wire baskets filled with rocks); crib walls (cells built up log cabin style from precast concrete or timber and filled with granular material).

=== Cantilevered ===
Cantilevered retaining walls are made from an internal stem of steel-reinforced, cast-in-place concrete or mortared masonry (often in the shape of an inverted T). These walls cantilever loads (like a beam) to a large, structural footing, converting horizontal pressures from behind the wall to vertical pressures on the ground below. Sometimes cantilevered walls are buttressed on the front, or include a counterfort on the back, to improve their strength resisting high loads. Buttresses are short wing walls at right angles to the main trend of the wall. These walls require rigid concrete footings below seasonal frost depth. This type of wall uses much less material than a traditional gravity wall.

=== Diaphragm wall ===
Diaphragm walls are a type of retaining walls that are very stiff and generally watertight. Diaphragm walls are expensive walls, but they save time and space, and hence are used in urban constructions.

=== Sheet piling ===
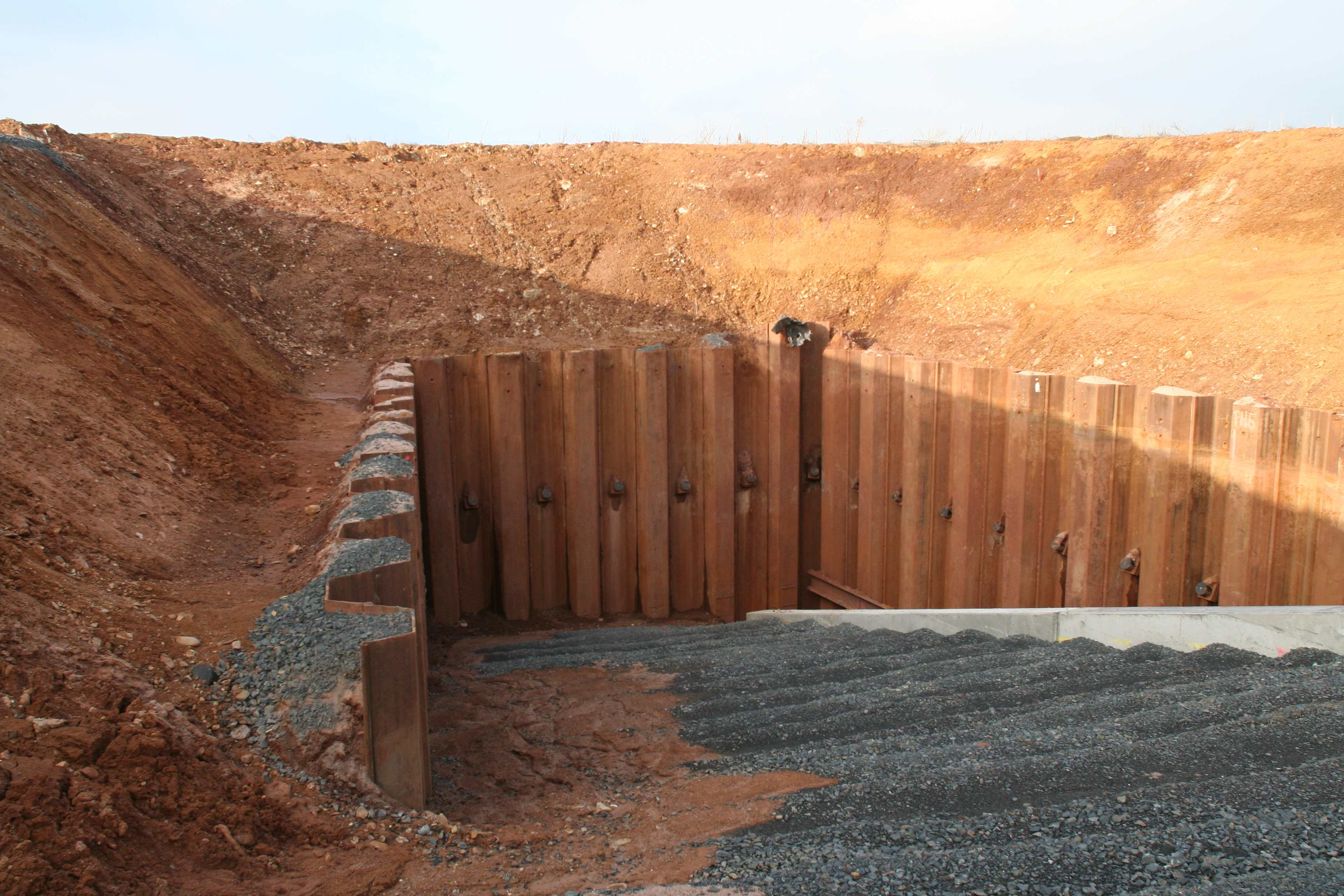
Sheet pile wall

Sheet pile retaining walls are usually used in soft soil and tight spaces. Sheet pile walls are driven into the ground and are composed of a variety of material including steel, vinyl, aluminum, fiberglass or wood planks. For a quick estimate the material is usually driven 1/3 above ground, 2/3 below ground, but this may be altered depending on the environment. Taller sheet pile walls will need a tie-back anchor, or "dead-man" placed in the soil a distance behind the face of the wall, that is tied to the wall, usually by a cable or a rod. Anchors are then placed behind the potential failure plane in the soil.

=== Bored pile ===
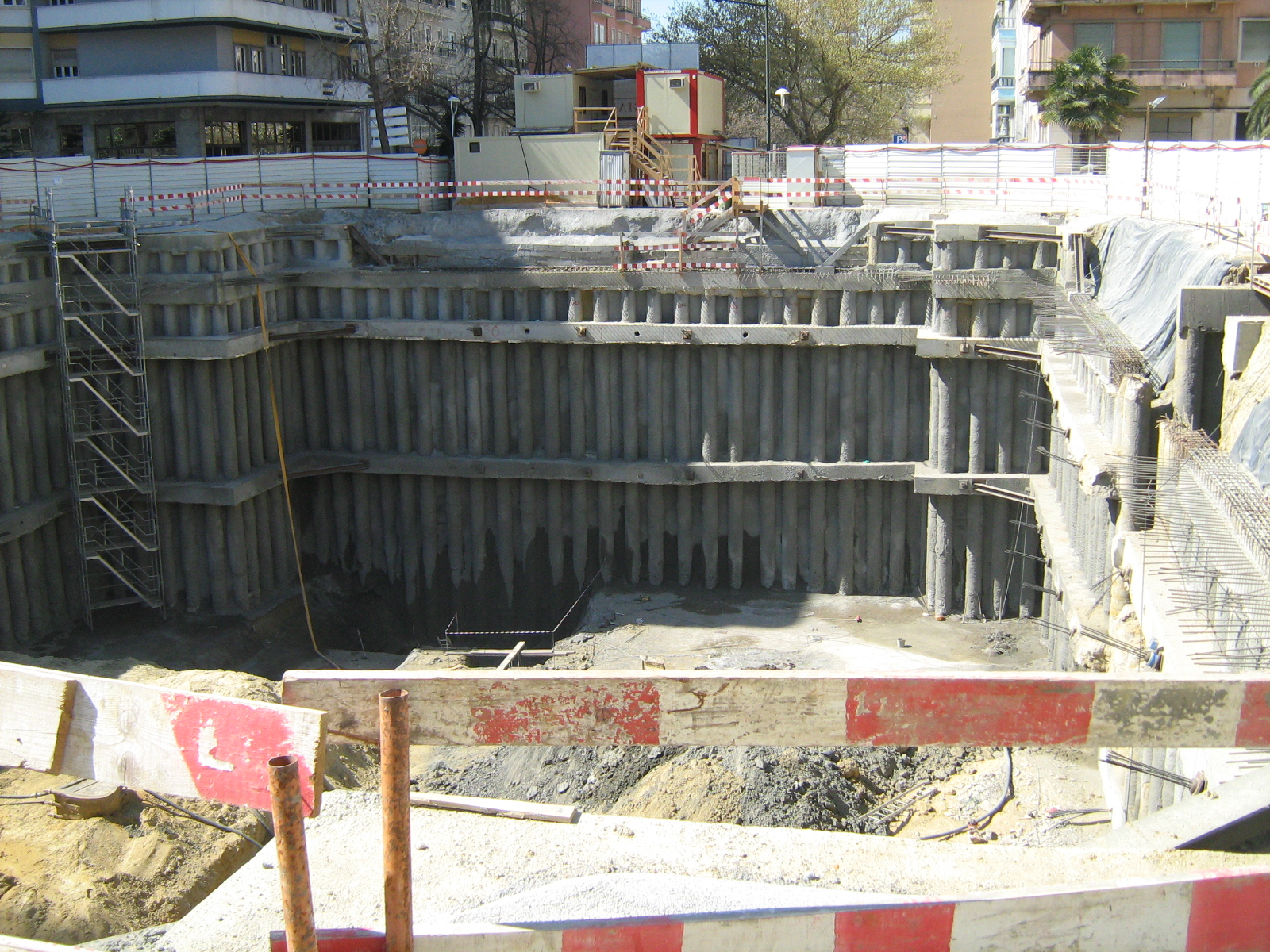
Bored pile retaining wall in Lisbon, Portugal

Bored pile retaining walls are built by assembling a sequence of bored piles, followed by excavating away the excess soil. Depending on the project, the bored pile retaining wall may include a series of earth anchors, reinforcing beams, soil improvement operations and shotcrete reinforcement layer. This construction technique tends to be employed in scenarios where sheet piling is a valid construction solution, but where the vibration or noise levels generated by a pile driver are not acceptable.

=== Anchored ===
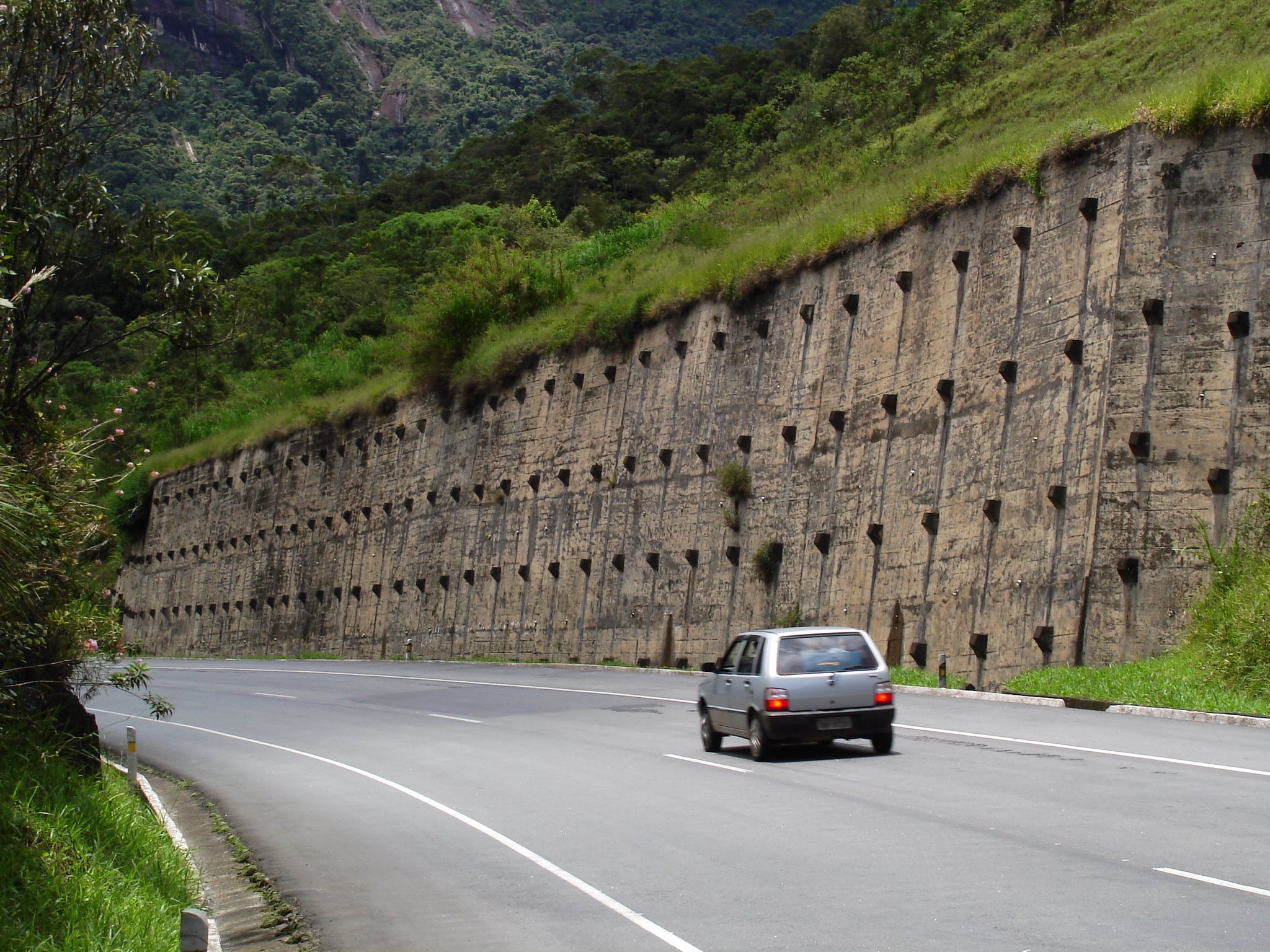
Anchored wall in the mountainous region of Rio de Janeiro state, Brazil

An anchored retaining wall can be constructed in any of the aforementioned styles but also includes additional strength using cables or other stays anchored in the rock or soil behind it. Usually driven into the material with boring, anchors are then expanded at the end of the cable, either by mechanical means or often by injecting pressurized concrete, which expands to form a bulb in the soil. Technically complex, this method is very useful where high loads are expected, or where the wall itself has to be slender and would otherwise be too weak.

== Alternative retaining techniques ==
=== Soil nailing ===
Soil nailing is a technique in which soil slopes, excavations or retaining walls are reinforced by the insertion of relatively slender elements – normally steel reinforcing bars. The bars are usually installed into a pre-drilled hole and then grouted into place or drilled and grouted simultaneously. They are usually installed untensioned at a slight downward inclination. A rigid or flexible facing (often sprayed concrete) or isolated soil nail heads may be used at the surface.

=== Soil-strengthened ===
A number of systems exist that do not consist of just the wall, but reduce the earth pressure acting directly on the wall. These are usually used in combination with one of the other wall types, though some may only use it as facing, i.e., for visual purposes.

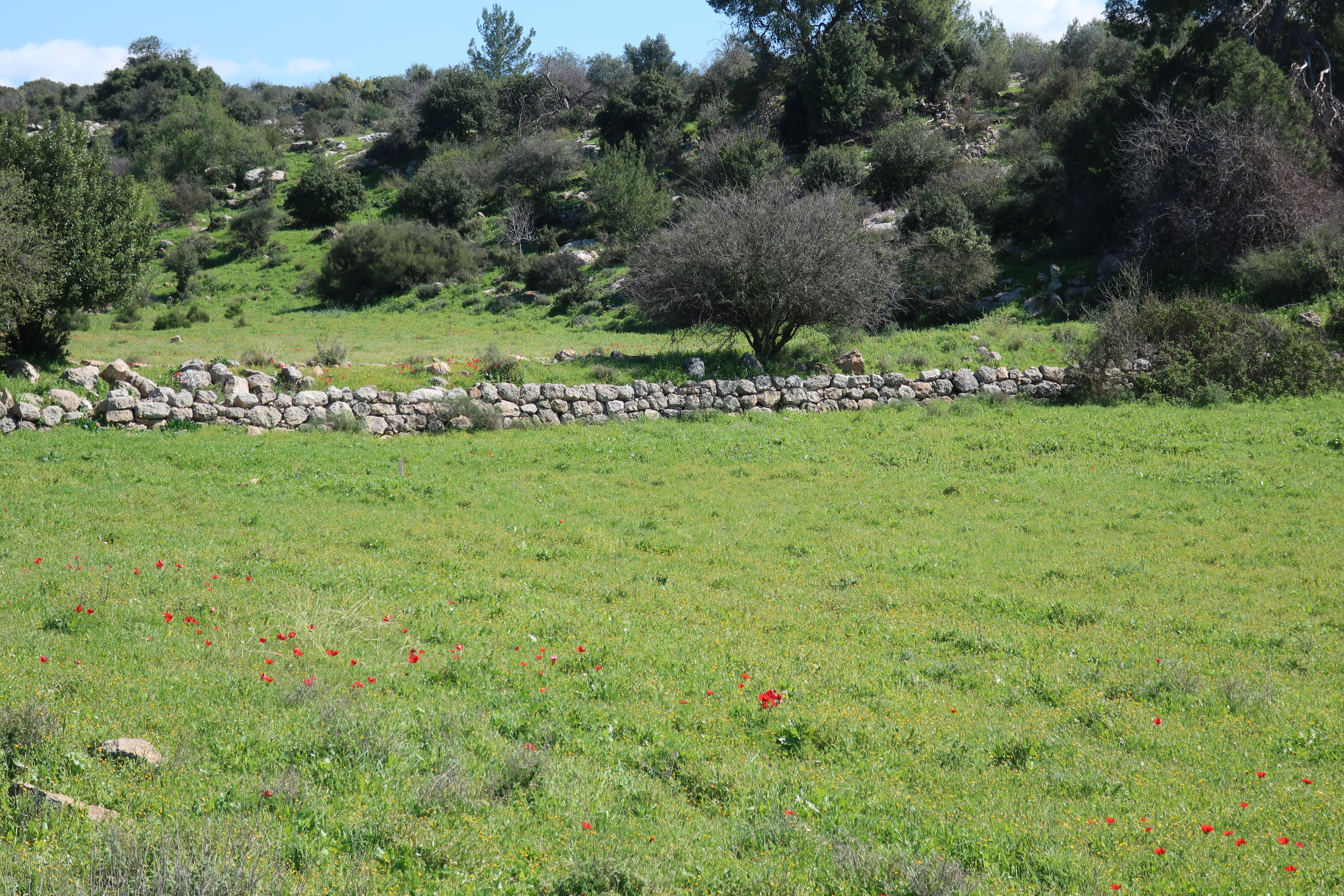
Stones of retaining wall used in preventing soil run-off in dale

==== Gabion meshes ====
This type of soil strengthening, often also used without an outside wall, consists of wire mesh "boxes", which are filled with roughly cut stone or other material. The mesh cages reduce some internal movement and forces, and also reduce erosive forces. Gabion walls are free-draining retaining structures and as such are often built in locations where ground water is present. However, management and control of the ground water in and around all retaining walls is important.

=== Mechanical stabilization ===
Mechanically stabilized earth, also called MSE, is soil constructed with artificial reinforcing via layered horizontal mats (geosynthetics) fixed at their ends. These mats provide added internal shear resistance beyond that of simple gravity wall structures. Other options include steel straps, also layered. This type of soil strengthening usually needs outer facing walls (S.R.W.'s – Segmental Retaining Walls) to affix the layers to and vice versa.

The wall face is often of precast concrete units that can tolerate some differential movement. The reinforced soil's mass, along with the facing, then acts as an improved gravity wall. The reinforced mass must be built large enough to retain the pressures from the soil behind it. Gravity walls usually must be a minimum of 50 to 60 percent as deep or thick as the height of the wall, and may have to be larger if there is a slope or surcharge on the wall.

Cellular confinement systems (geocells) are also used for steep earth stabilization in gravity and reinforced retaining walls with geogrids. Geocell retaining walls are structurally stable under self- weight and externally imposed loads, while the flexibility of the structure offers very high seismic resistance. The outer fascia cells of the wall can be planted with vegetation to create a green wall.

== See also ==
- Civil engineering
- Direct shear test
- Earthquake engineering
- Flying arch
- Foundation (engineering)
- Geotechnical engineering
- Ha-ha
- Landslide mitigation
- Lateral earth pressure
- Revetment
- Seawall
- Slope stability analysis
- Structural engineering
- Terraced wall
- Trench shield
- Trench shoring
