= Chesapeake Beach =

Chesapeake Beach may refer to a community in the United States:

- Chesapeake Beach, Maryland
- Chesapeake Beach, Virginia
