= Technical rescue =

Use of specialised tools and skills for rescue

Technical rescue is the use of specialised tools and skills for rescue, including but not limited to confined space rescue, rope rescue, trench rescue, structural collapse rescue, ice rescue, swift water rescue, underwater rescue, and cave rescue. These often require specialised rescue squads as they exceed the capabilities of other members of the fire service or emergency medical services (EMS).

In the United States, technical rescues will often have multiple jurisdictions operating together to effect the rescue, and will often use the Incident Command System to manage the incident and resources at the scene. National Fire Protection Association standards NFPA 1006 and NFPA 1670 state that all rescuers must have a minimum of first aid (infection control, bleeding control, shock management) and CPR training to perform any technical rescue operation, including cutting the vehicle itself during an extrication.

== See also ==
- Rescue squad
- 911th Engineer Company
