= Trench shield =

Structure used to prevent a cave-in of a trench

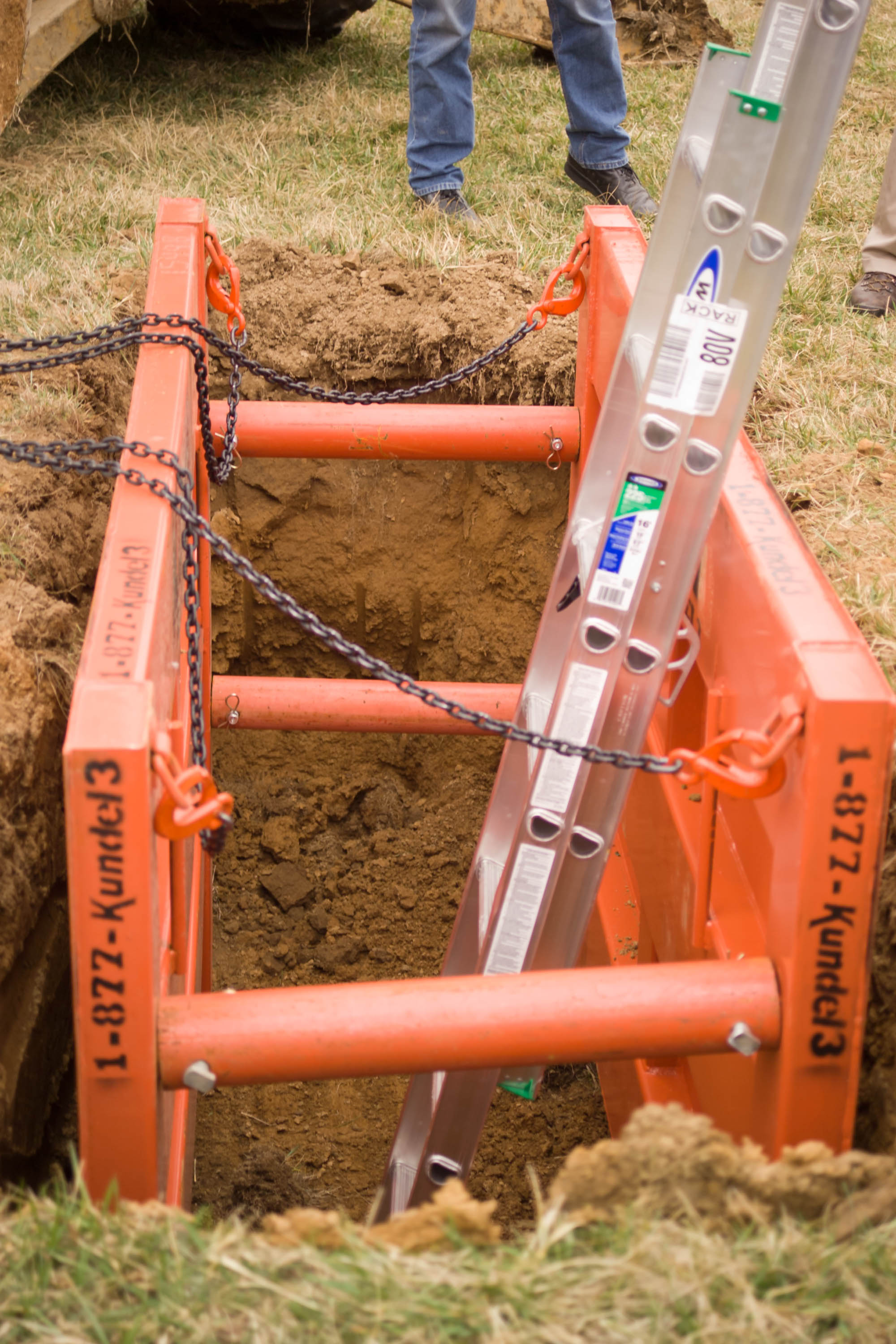
A trench box in use with chains still attached and a ladder in place

Trench shields (also called trench boxes or trench sheets) are steel or aluminum structures used to avoid cave-ins and protect utility workers while performing their duties within a trench. They are customarily constructed with sidewalls of varying thicknesses held apart by steel or aluminum spreaders. Spreaders can be interchanged to match the width of the trench. The different materials and building designs lead to a variety of depth ratings: the depth of a trench that the shield can withstand a collapse without buckling. Depth ratings are determined by registered professional engineers.

A shield should not be confused with a shore. While they may serve a similar function, trench shoring is a different physical application that holds up the walls of a trench to prevent collapse.

In the US, use of a trench shield is governed by OSHA 29 CFR Part 1926.650-.652 Subpart P-Excavations.
