= Digging =

Removal of material from a solid surface

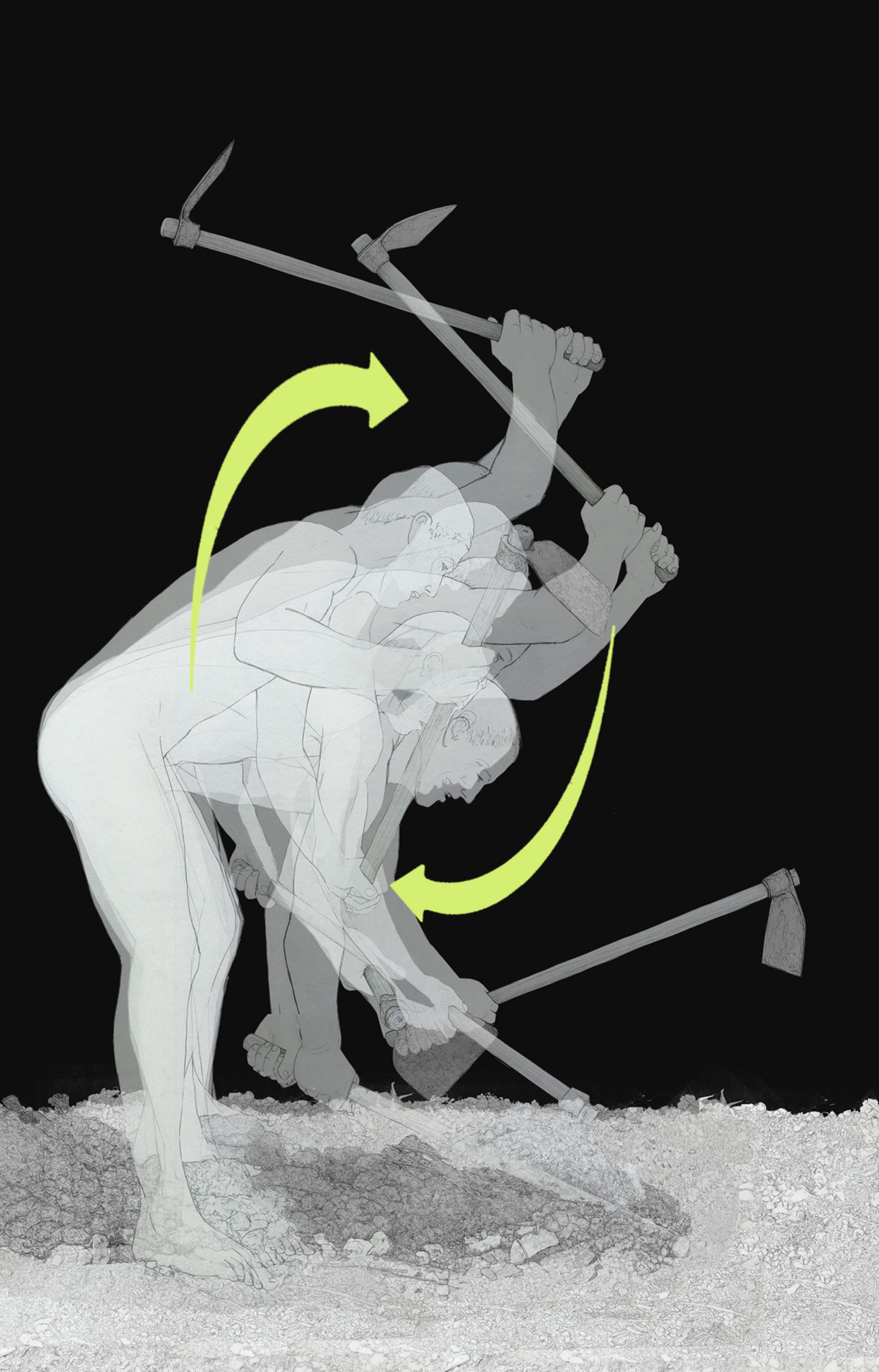
Movements of the ploughman when digging

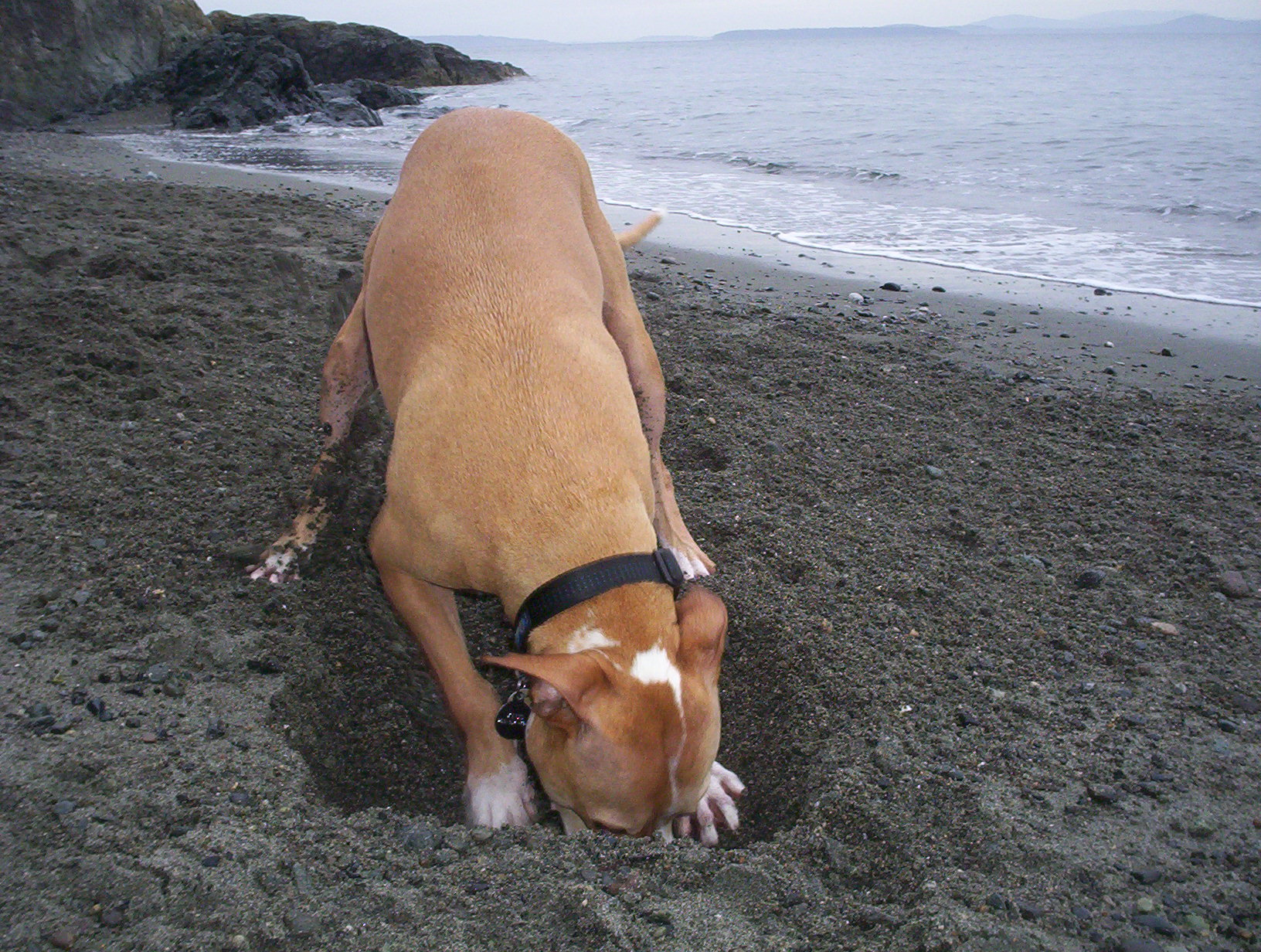
A dog digging on a beach.

Digging, also referred to as excavation, is the process of using some implement such as claws, hands, manual tools or heavy equipment, to remove material from a solid surface, usually soil, sand or rock on the surface of Earth. Digging is actually the combination of two processes, the first being the breaking or cutting of the surface, and the second being the removal and relocation of the material found there. In a simple digging situation, this may be accomplished in a single motion, with the digging implement being used to break the surface and immediately fling the material away from the hole or other structure being dug.

Many kinds of animals engage in digging, either as part of burrowing behavior or to search for food or water under the surface of the ground. Historically, humans have engaged in digging for both of these reasons, and for a variety of additional reasons, such as engaging in agriculture and gardening, searching for minerals, metals, and other raw materials such as during mining and quarrying, preparing for construction, making fortifications and irrigation, and also excavations in archaeology, searching for fossils and rocks in palaeontology and geology and burial of the dead.

== Digging by humans ==
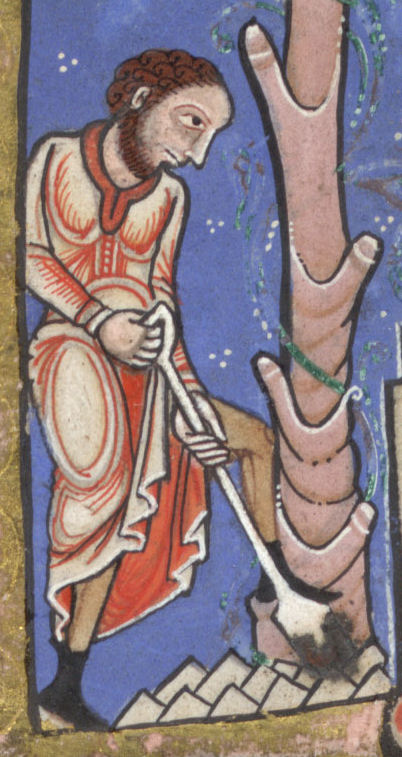
Twelfth century illustration of a man digging.

=== Reasons ===
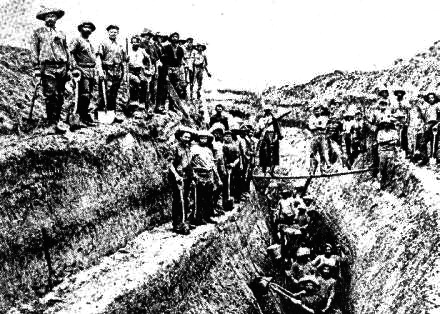
A group of men digging for Kauri gum in New Zealand

There are a wide variety of reasons for which humans dig holes, trenches, and other subsurface structures. It has long been observed that humans have a seemingly instinctive desire to dig holes in the ground, manifesting in childhood.

Like other animals, humans dig in the ground to find food and water. Wood-lined water wells are known from the early Neolithic Linear Pottery culture, for example in Kückhoven (an outlying centre of Erkelenz), dated 5090 BC and Eythra, dated 5200 BC in Schletz (an outlying centre of Asparn an der Zaya) in Austria. Humans are unique among animals in the practice of burial of the dead. Intentional burial, particularly with grave goods, may be one of the earliest detectable forms of religious practice since, as Philip Lieberman suggests, it may signify a "concern for the dead that transcends daily life". Evidence suggests that the Neanderthals were the first human species to practice burial behavior and intentionally bury their dead, doing so in shallow graves along with stone tools and animal bones. Exemplary sites include Shanidar in Iraq, Kebara Cave in Israel and Krapina in Croatia. Some scholars, however, argue that these bodies may have been disposed of for secular reasons. Notably, burial of the dead prevents diseases associated with the presence of corpses, and prevents scavengers and other predators from being attracted.

The earliest undisputed human burial discovered so far dates back 100,000 years. Human skeletal remains stained with red ochre were discovered in the Skhul cave at Qafzeh, Israel. A variety of grave goods were present at the site, including the mandible of a wild boar in the arms of one of the skeletons.

As human technology advanced, digging began to be used for agriculture, mining, and in earthworks, and new techniques and technologies were developed to suit these purposes.

==== Borrow pit ====
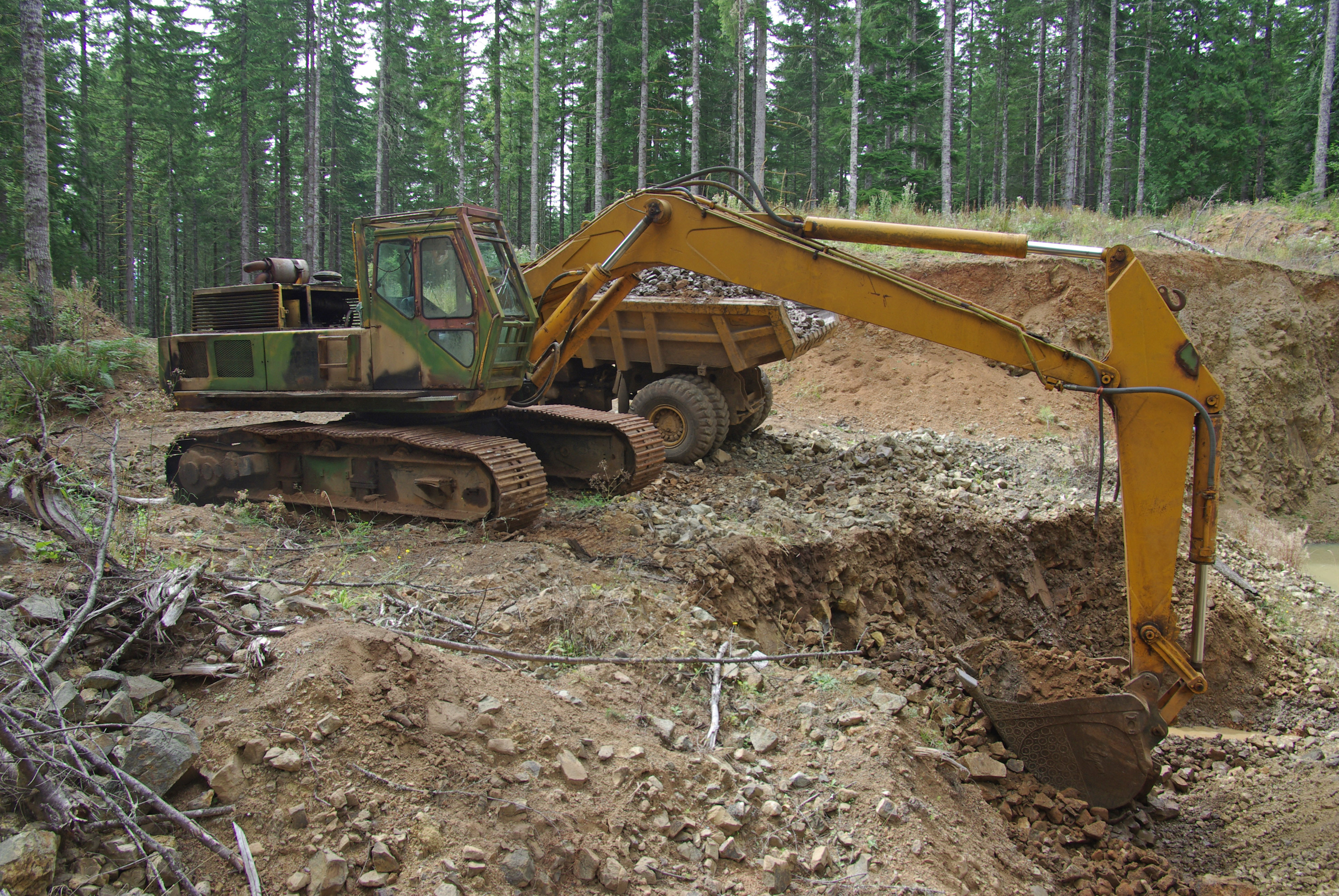
An excavator working in a borrow pit.

In construction and civil engineering, a borrow pit, also known as a sand box, is an area where material (usually soil, gravel or sand) has been dug for use at another location. Borrow pits can be found close to many major construction projects. For example, soil might be excavated to fill an embankment for a highway, clay might be excavated for use in brick-making, gravel to be used for making concrete, etc.

In some cases, the borrow pits may become filled with ground water, forming recreational areas or sustainable wildlife habitats (one such example is the Merton Borrow Pit, near Oxford in central England, excavated to provide materials for the nearby M40 motorway). In other cases, borrow pits may be used for landfill and waste disposal.

Borrow pits are common archaeological features in Waikato, where sand and gravel were dug to mix with clay topsoils to improve their drainage and friability, to suit growth of kūmara and taro, brought by Māori from tropical islands.

A regional variation of this is termed "barrow pit" in the western United States (especially the Rocky Mountains). The localism—sometimes pronounced "borrer pit"—describes the ditch along a roadway. These ditches were excavated to provide the fill to level and crown the roadway and subsequently provided drainage for the road.

An excavation lake (also a flooded gravel pit) is an artificial lake, which usually has its origins in the excavation of gravel or sand for construction materials or in some other kind of surface mining. In many cases, the excavation holes are landscaped according to the land restoration required by law. Because the excavation reached a point below the water table, lakes form naturally. Less frequently, excavation lakes are intentionally made, especially as recreation areas.

In Germany and Austria the lakes are almost always used for fishing, since a fishery is created by law with every surface water. At some excavation lakes, beaches are added for swimming or other water sports, in particular boating, water skiing or windsurfing. To support these uses, large parking lots, changing areas, and eating areas are also set up. In some cases, the excavation lake serves as a nature reserve, as in the case of the lakes in the Attenborough Nature Reserve.

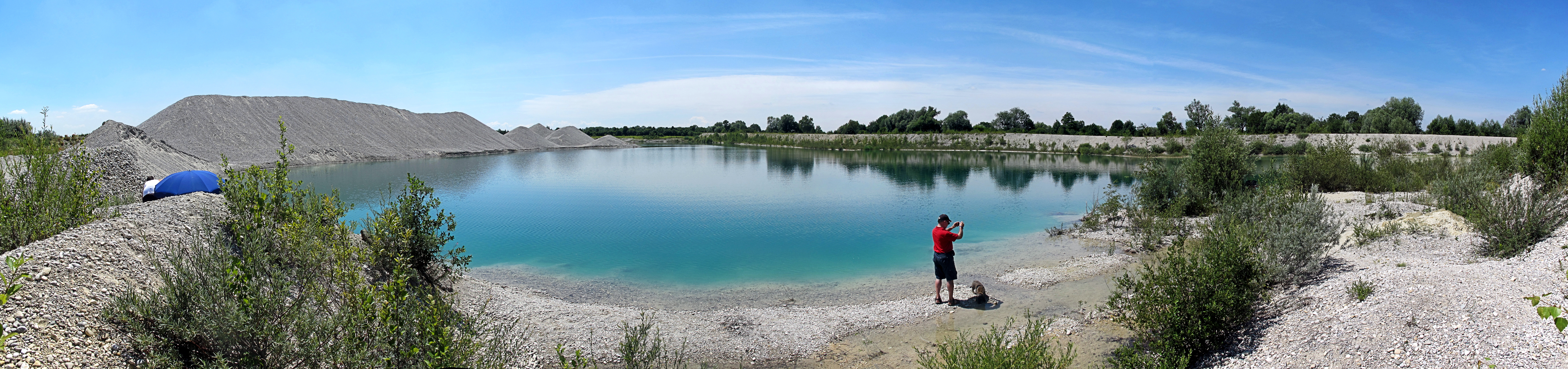
Panorama of a "young" excavation lake in the Fürstenfeldbruck district of Germany.

=== Methods of digging ===
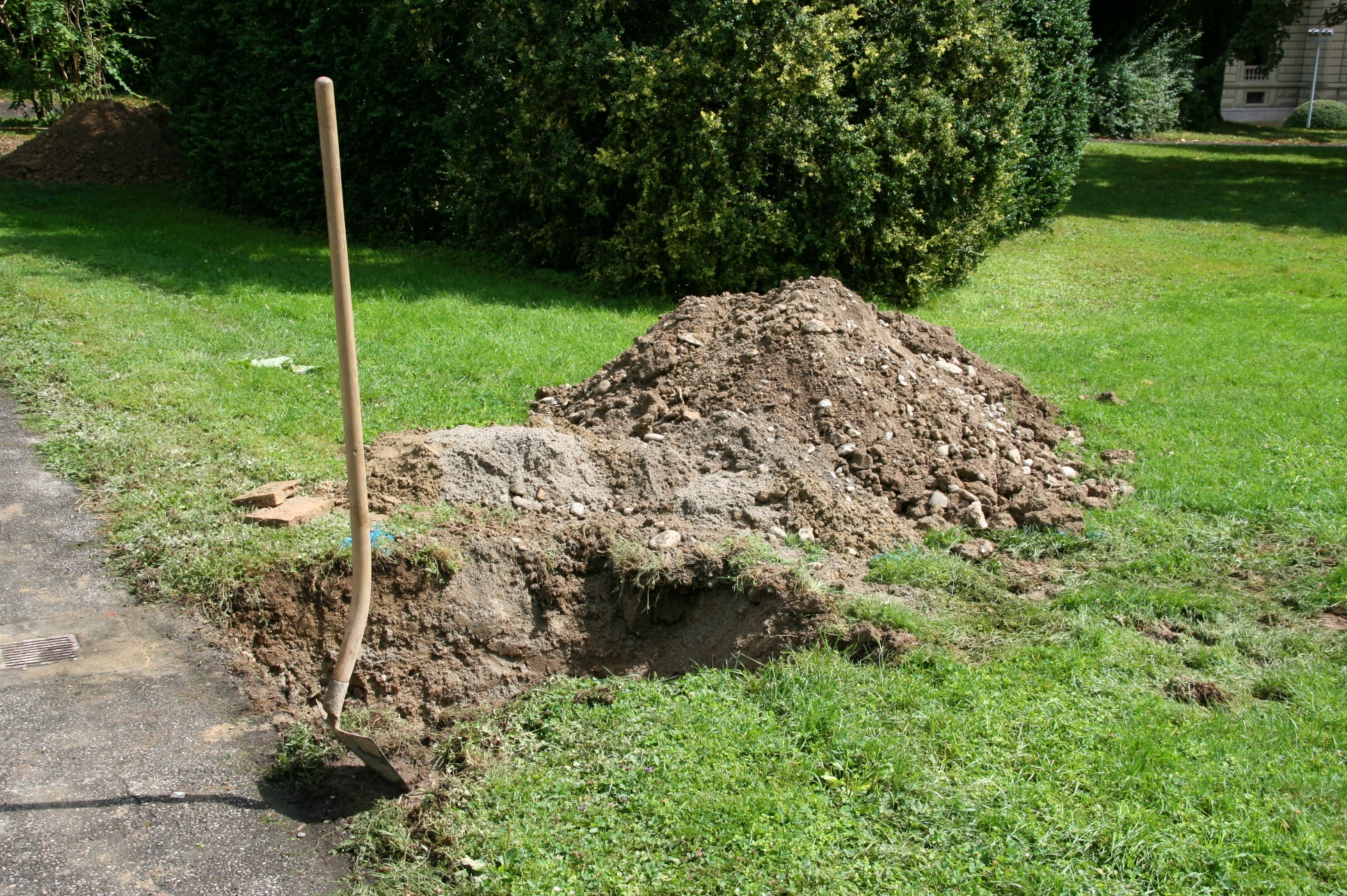
Shovel next to a dug hole in a garden.

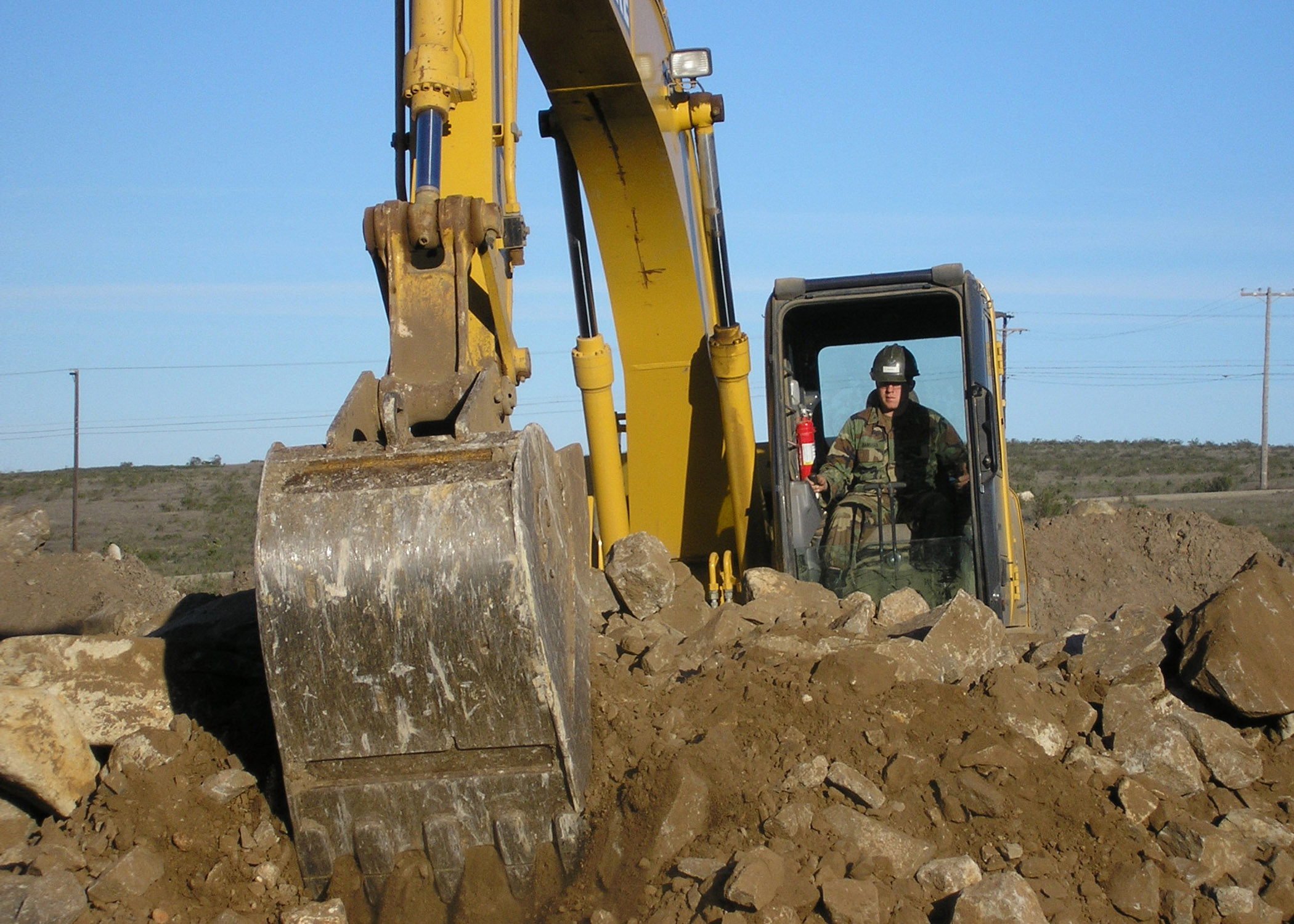
Construction equipment being used to dig up rocky ground.

Although humans are capable of digging in sand and soil using their bare hands, digging is often more easily accomplished with tools. The most basic tool for digging is the shovel. In Neolithic times and earlier, a large animal's scapula (shoulder blade) was often used as a crude shovel. In modern times, shovels are typically made of metal, with a wooden handle. Because digging is a cutting process, particularly where the soil being dug contains plant roots, digging is aided by the shovel being sharpened.

Historically, manual shoveling (often in combination with picking) was the chief means of excavation in construction, mining, and quarrying, and digging projects employed large numbers of people. After the Industrial Revolution, mechanization via steam shovels and later hydraulic equipment (excavators such as backhoes and loaders) gradually replaced most manual shoveling; however, individual homeowners still often find reasons to engage in manual digging during smaller-scale projects around the home. Different methods of digging can also result in different excavation depth and force, potentially risking exposure or damage to subsurface pipelines and wiring. In the United States and Canada, homeowners and contractors are required to notify a utility-run call center before digging to ensure they do not strike buried utilities and infrastructure.

=== Soil suitability ===
The excavatability of an earth (rock and regolith) material is a measure of the material to be excavated (dug) with conventional excavation equipment such as a bulldozer with rippers, backhoe, scraper and other grading equipment. Materials that cannot be excavated with conventional excavation equipment are said to be non-rippable. Such material typically requires pre-blasting or use of percussion hammers or chisels to facilitate excavation. The excavatability or rippability of earth materials is evaluated typically by a geophysicist, engineering geologist, or geotechnical engineer.

The rippability of an earth (rock) material is a measure of its ability to be excavated with conventional excavation equipment. A material may be classified as rippable, marginally rippable or non-rippable. The rippability of a material is often evaluated by an engineering geologist and/or geophysicist utilizing the seismic refraction equipment (see refraction). Rippability studies can involve the performance of seismic refraction traverses, the drilling of borings with an air percussion drill rig, the excavation of test trenches with a bulldozer with rippers or backhoe, and by geologic mapping.

== Cave-in ==
Cave-in of an excavation is the detachment of the mass of soil in the side of the trench and its displacement into the hole, which represents a hazard to the person inside. Cave-ins are considered the largest risk when working within trenches. Cave-ins can be caused by a combination of pressure on soil, vibration from equipment, and excessive loads. Several techniques are used to minimize the likelihood of cave-ins, including sloping, shoring and shielding.

== Types of digging ==
- Archaeological excavation
  - Dump digging
- Cave digging
- Clam digging
- Double digging, gardening technique
- Gum digging
- Privy digging
- Well digging
