= NFPA 1006 =

NFPA 1006 (Standard on Operations and Training for Technical Search and Rescue Incidents) is a standard published by the National Fire Protection Association which identifies the minimum job performance requirements (JPRs) for fire service and other emergency response personnel who perform technical rescue operations.

== Revision history ==
Standard revision	Status	Effective date
NFPA 1006-2017	Future revision, draft is open for public input	To be determined
Errata 1006-13-1	Errata for NFPA 1006-2013	2014-05-07
TIA 13-1	Tentative interim amendment (TIA) for NFPA 1006-2013	2013-10-22
NFPA 1006-2013	Current revision of the standard	2012-12-17
Errata 08-2	Errata for NFPA 1006-2008	2009-10-16
Errata 08-1	Errata for NFPA 1006-2008	2008-04-01
NFPA 1006-2008	Prior revision, superseded by NFPA 1006-2013	2012-12-31
NFPA 1006-2003	Prior revision, superseded by NFPA 1006-2008	?
Errata 00-1	Errata for NFPA 1006-2000	2000-05-11
NFPA 1006-2000	Prior revision, superseded by NFPA 1006-2003	?
