= Confined space rescue =

Skilled technical rescue methods

Confined space rescue is a subset of technical rescue operations that involves the rescue and recovery of victims trapped in a confined space or in a place only accessible through confined spaces, such as underground vaults, storage silos, storage tanks, or sewers.

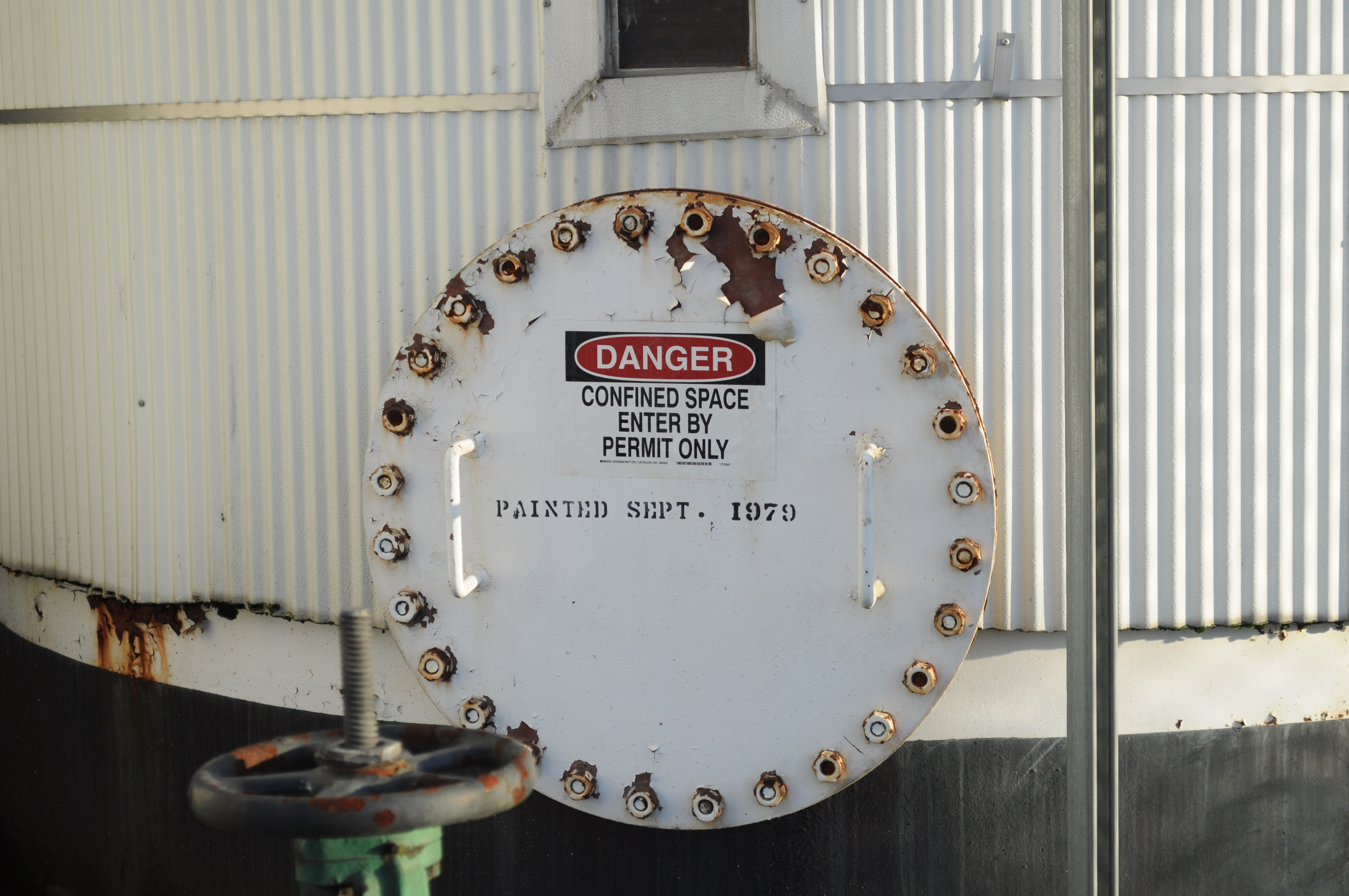
A warning label on a storage tank, indicating that it is a confined space.

Confined spaces are often narrow and constricting, preventing easy access by rescuers and making confined space rescues technically challenging. The spaces are usually unlit or poorly lit, requiring a light source to be provided. Confined spaces may contain hazardous materials in liquid or gas form, and oxygen may be limited.

These hazards can be fatal as they create a limited window of time in which to perform a rescue. After four minutes without oxygen a person will usually suffer asphyxia causing brain damage or death. The urgent need to rescue someone from a confined space often leads to ill-prepared rescue attempts. Two-thirds of all deaths occurring in confined spaces are attributed to persons attempting to rescue someone else.

== Confined space rescue categories ==
=== Self rescue ===
A person may recognize a critical condition or symptoms of exposure, and exit the space without assistance. Alternatively, an entry monitor outside the space may recognize a new hazard and have people leave the space before they are affected. This is the preferred rescue method, as confined space hazards can quickly incapacitate or kill. A person can almost always exit a confined space much faster than waiting to be rescued.

=== Non-entry rescue ===
A non-entry rescue involves attempting to extricate an incapacitated person without having anyone else enter the confined space.

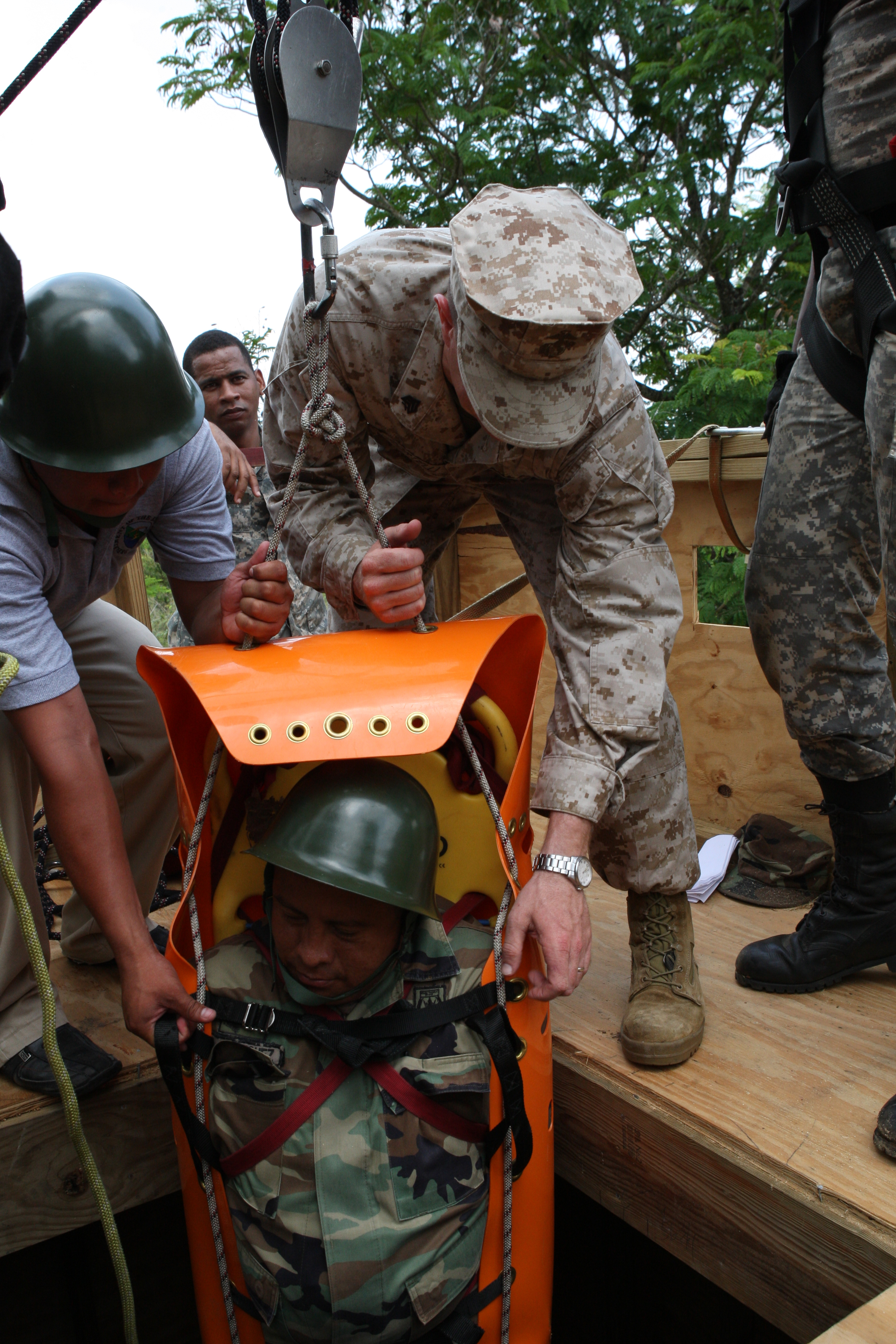
Military and police personnel practicing confined space rescue techniques.

=== Entry rescue ===
This is a last resort option as having more personnel enter an area that has already incapacitated one or more persons places the rescuer at considerable risk. Entry rescues must be carefully planned and executed to avoid creating more victims in need of rescue. Rescuers need to be aware of their surroundings and must reevaluate their plans immediately if there is any change in the conditions of the confined space.

In the event of an entry rescue, standby rescuers are recommended in the event that the initial entry rescuer(s) encounter trouble.

== Rescue equipment ==
Due to the unique nature of confined space rescues, there is specialized equipment necessary to perform a safe and successful rescue.

One of the initial pieces of equipment employed in a confined space is a method of ventilation to disperse collected hazardous gases and introduce fresh air into the environment.

A wristlet is often the first item used to actually perform the rescue, as opposed to the ventilator which is used to prepare the environment for a rescue. A wristlet is a cloth strap that is used to cinch tightly around the wrist or ankle of an incapacitated person. Once the strap is looped around a hand or foot, its attached rope is pulled by rescuers, tightening around the arm or leg and pulling the victim out of the confined space.

In the event that an entry rescue must be performed, rescue personnel will wear protective clothing appropriate for the situation. This may include a self contained breathing apparatus (SCBA), protective headgear and the use of explosion proof lighting (to prevent igniting any gases). The rescuer may also wear a full body harness with an attached safety line, especially if a vertical descent is required. To assist in vertical descents, a mechanical winch and tripod may be set up over the access point, if the bottom of the confined space is more than five feet from the entrance.

The rescuers may also carry monitoring equipment by which they can ascertain the quality of the air in the environment. Even if the air quality reading does not indicate any hazardous conditions, it is still recommended that rescuers wear SCBA.

== Regulation ==
In the UK confined space is governed by HSE (Health and Safety Executive), which states that those entering a confined space cannot rely on 999 for rescue.

In Canada, The Oil Sands Safety Association has a certification program for Confined Space Entry and Monitor.

== See also ==
- Cave rescue
- Mine rescue
- Trench rescue
- Incident Response Team
