= Chic's Beach =

Beach in Virginia, United States

Coordinates: 36°54′56″N 76°07′13″W

Chic's Beach, also known as Chesapeake Beach or Chick's Beach, is a small beach in a residential neighborhood running on the east and west sides of the Chesapeake Bay Bridge Tunnel in Virginia Beach, Virginia, United States. What originated as a lookout post during war, the beach eventually turned to more recreational activities. The area developed in the early 1900s as a beachfront residential community. Chic's was a restaurant that sold items such as limeade and ice cream. Eventually, this site became what is now Buoy 44 Restaurant. The terms Chic's and Chick's Beach have stuck. It is a diverse area consisting of beach cottages, condominiums, townhouses, duplexes, apartments, and single-family homes. The beach community is bordered on the south by Shore Drive. Shore Drive is one of the corridors leading to the tourist destination of the Virginia Beach oceanfront and is currently undergoing many improvements to the biking and jogging trails. Little Creek Naval Amphibious Base caps the west side of this community, merging longer stretches of undeveloped, protected beaches which harbor dolphins and other marine life.

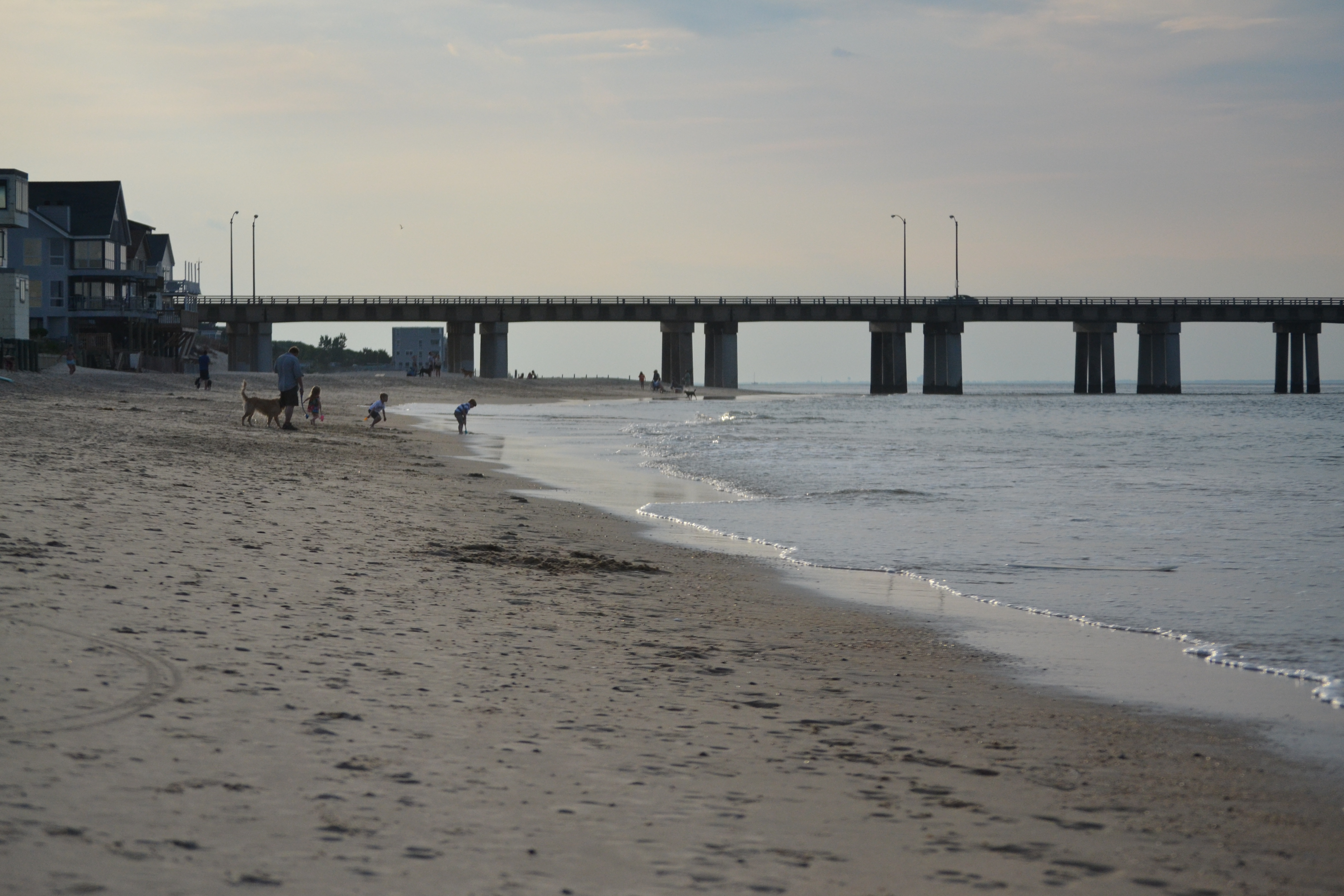
Chic's Beach at sunset, with the Chesapeake Bay Bridge-Tunnel in the background

Chesapeake Beach also contains the Pleasure House Point Natural Area which features 118 acres (48 ha) of marshlands and wildlife habitat. This is also where the longest bay-bridge connects to the Eastern Shore, across the Chesapeake Bay (Chesapeake Bay Bridge–Tunnel).

The residents of this community experience less public traffic due to restricted parking and relatively less renown than other area beaches. The common activities of these neighborhoods include boating the four lakes winding through the area, jet skiing, kayaking, stand up paddleboarding, walking the beach and sailing on the Bay, and youth engage in skateboarding, skimboarding and creating sand-castles.
