= Trench rescue =

Rescue of a person from a collapsed trench

Trench rescue is a specialized form of rescue, a subset of confined space rescue. Trench rescue involves shoring up the sides of a trench, and digging a trapped worker out of a collapsed ditch. Trench rescue is one of the most dangerous rescue operations to complete.
