= NFPA 1670 =

National Fire Protection Association published standard

NFPA 1670 (Standard on Operations and Training for Technical Search and Rescue Incidents) is a standard published by the National Fire Protection Association. The standard identifies and establishes levels of functional capability for conducting operations at technical search and rescue incidents while minimizing threats to rescuers. The last edition was published in 2017, with subsequent editions being integrated into the NFPA 2500.
