= FRDM Multi-Skill Team =

Special-operations unit in the Malaysian Fire and Rescue Department

Multi-Skill Team
- Founded: September 11, 1998; 28 years ago
- Disbanded: 30 November 2024
- Country: Malaysia
- Branch: Fire and Rescue Department of Malaysia
- Type: Special operations firefighter
- Role: Air rescue; Search and rescue; High-rise rescue and firefighting; Maritime firefighting; Jungle firefighting
- Size: 620 firefighters (as of September 2024)
- Part of: FRDM Air Division
- Headquarters: FRDM Subang Air Base
- Nicknames: "MUSTeam", "MUST", "MUST Team"
- Mottos: Cekap dan pantas ('Efficient and fast')

The Multi-Skill Team (lit. 'Pasukan Pelbagai Kemahiran', Abbr.: MUST) is a specialised firefighter and rescue unit within the Fire and Rescue Department of Malaysia (FRDM). The unit is highly trained for rapid deployment in helicopter operations and excels in firefighting and rescue missions, especially in challenging locations like high-rise buildings, jungles, and offshore areas. MUST personnel are skilled in various forms of search and rescue operations and often assist as ground crew for helicopters during missions.

While administratively under the FRDM's Air Division, MUST firefighters are stationed at regular fire stations across Malaysia rather than at FRDM's air bases. This strategic placement enables them to act as first responders in local incidents and to provide rapid support for helicopter-assisted missions when required.

MUST is one of the FRDM's several elite rescue teams. They are considered among the most elite units, alongside the Special Tactical Operation and Rescue Team of Malaysia (STORM), Smoke Jumper, and Special Air Unit (PASKUB).

== History ==
=== Established as a special operations firefighter unit attached to the Air Division ===
The Multi-Skill Team (MUST) was founded on 11 September 1998 in conjunction with the 1998 Commonwealth Games. Initially composed of 21 firefighters, MUST was established to support the newly created Air Division, ensuring the safety of international athletes and officials. The team's expertise was crucial for the event, given the high-rise athlete accommodations near the Bukit Jalil sports complex. At the time, MUST's responsibilities encompassed a broad range of emergency responses, including:

- High-Rise Rescue
- Water Rescue
- Road traffic accident response
- Handling Hazardous Materials
- Urban Search and Rescue
- Emergency Medical and Rescue Services
- Jungle-fire suppression
- High Angle Rescue
- Air Rescue

Due to the variety of their specialised roles, the unit was aptly named the Multi-Skill Team (MUST).

=== Shift to air operations focus ===
In the early 2000s, MUST underwent restructuring, redistributing some of its initial responsibilities to dedicated FRDM units. Hazardous Materials (HAZMAT) operations were reassigned to the HAZMAT unit, and water rescues were handed back to the Water Rescue Unit. This transition allowed MUST to concentrate on high-rise rescues, air rescues, and firefighting in hard-to-reach areas, honing its role as an elite team in complex rescue and firefighting missions. The team also adapted its expertise in helicopter operations, managing landing coordination in rugged terrains—a function resembling that of air assault or pathfinder units.

In 2005, selected MUST firefighters received parachute training with the RMAF Special Forces. Following this, the Smoke Jumper unit was established under MUST's command, further expanding the unit's operational scope to include aerial fire suppression and enhancing their role in high-stakes, remote firefighting operations.

=== Planned phase-out and integration with STORM ===
In a statement on 30 September 2024 in Kuching, Sarawak, the director general of FRDM, Datuk Nor Hisham Mohammad, announced plans to dissolve MUST and integrate its members into the Special Tactical Operation and Rescue Team of Malaysia (STORM). This decision reflects redundancy between MUST's roles and those of FRDM Special Air Unit (PASKUB), another specialised air operations unit. Current MUST firefighters are now undergoing urban search and rescue training to prepare for the transition as the unit phases out. This integration aims to streamline FRDM's capabilities and consolidate resources for special rescue operations in Malaysia.

== Roles ==
The Multi-Skill Team plays several critical roles within Malaysia’s Fire and Rescue Department (FRDM), particularly in air operations, high-rise rescue, jungle-fire suppression, and search and rescue operations.

In air operations

As part of the FRDM Air Division, MUST firefighters are specially trained for aerial deployment techniques, including winching down, abseiling, and fast-roping from helicopters to reach inaccessible or hazardous locations. Although the establishment of FRDM Special Air Unit (PASKUB) in 2012 took over some of MUST's previous air operation roles, MUST continues to provide essential support for specialised air deployments and high-stakes aerial firefighting.

In high-rise rescue

MUST firefighters are extensively trained in rope rescue techniques, often collaborating with the Special Tactical Operation and Rescue Team of Malaysia (STORM). This joint approach enables both units to execute complex high-rise rescues with a high degree of efficiency and precision, leveraging their expertise to navigate challenging structures and safely extract individuals from elevated locations.

In jungle-fire suppression

MUST and STORM firefighters are skilled in handling jungle fires, although their methods of deployment differ. MUST firefighters are equipped for helicopter insertion, allowing rapid response to remote fires, whereas STORM typically reaches jungle fire locations by land. This helicopter mobility grants MUST a unique advantage for reaching fires that would otherwise be inaccessible.

In search and rescue (SAR) operations

During search and rescue operations, MUST functions as an essential support unit. These missions are generally led by STORM, with MUST contributing to on-ground efforts and serving as ground crew for rescue helicopters. This coordinated approach among FRDM's specialised units ensures efficient SAR operations and optimises resource use across challenging and diverse environments.

== Identities ==
The Multi-Skill Team has distinctive insignia that highlight its elite status and specialised skills.

=== MUST shoulder patch ===
The MUST shoulder patch reflects the unit’s multi-faceted capabilities and heritage. The design features:

- Mil Mi-17 helicopter: Symbolises the unit’s primary role in aerial firefighting and rescue missions.
- Paddy Rice Wreath: Reflects the team’s commitment to serve and protect the nation.
- Survival knife: Represents MUST’s readiness to operate in rugged, challenging environments.
- Anchor: Denotes the unit's versatility in performing maritime operations.
- Blue cloud with a white and red trail: Symbolises the team’s rapid response capability and incorporates the colours of the Malaysian flag.

=== MUST Skills Wings ===
The MUST Skills Wings badge is an unofficial emblem worn by Multi-Skill Team (MUST) firefighters, symbolising their specialised training in helicopter operations. (Note: Although the MUST Skills Wings badge is not officially authorised by the FRDM, MUST firefighters have adopted it as an informal symbol of their specialised training. Despite lacking official approval, they wear this badge on their uniforms as a mark of their unique skills and aircrew capabilities.) Although not formally authorised by the Fire and Rescue Department of Malaysia, it has become a recognised marker of the team’s unique capabilities, similar to the U.S. Army Air Assault badge. (Note: In contrast to military organisations, the Fire and Rescue Department of Malaysia (FRDM) lacks an official system of skills badges to signify a firefighter’s specialised training or qualifications. As a result, many firefighters wear badges that represent skills acquired through specialised courses conducted outside of the department.)

Its design, inspired by the U.S. Naval Aircrew Badge, incorporates elements that reflect both national pride and the expertise of MUST members:

- Pair of wings: Represents the unit's expertise in helicopter operations.
- Crescent moon and 14-pointed star: A symbol from the Malaysian flag, showing national pride and identity.
- Red hexagon: Represents the knowledge and theory behind the most effective firefighting techniques.
- Crossed fire axe and pike pole: Traditional firefighting tools, emphasising the unit’s skills in both rescue and firefighting tasks.

== Selection and training ==
The MUSTeam Selection and Training process is rigorous, designed to ensure candidates are physically and mentally prepared for the high demands of the Multi-Skill Team (MUST). Open to firefighters across all ranks, this selection process is held several times a year at different locations throughout Malaysia.

=== MUSTeam selection (5 days) ===
The selection phase, conducted at the state level, filters candidates who demonstrate the physical and mental readiness needed for the unit. During this five-day assessment, candidates are briefed on the job responsibilities of MUST firefighters and undergo several evaluations, including:

- Health screening
- 2.4 kilometres (1.5 mi) running
- Survival simulation
- Swimming test
- Theory test
- Personality Test

=== Basic MUST Course (3 weeks) ===
The 21-day Basic MUST Course builds foundational skills for all prospective MUST firefighters. Initially, the course lasted 15 days but was extended to 21 days in the 2020s with the integration of the Helicopter Operations Module, previously a separate course. Instructors, primarily from experienced MUST members and Special Air Unit (PASKUB), guide candidates through five core modules:

Camp module

Candidates undergo physical endurance training and practical map-reading exercises. They are tested on land navigation, using learnt skills to navigate from camp to jungle, ending at the beach at night.

Swamp module

After reaching the beach, candidates strip down to essentials and are transported to a mangrove swamp. For four days, they learn swamp survival techniques, preparing them to survive in such terrain if a helicopter crash occurs there.

Jungle module

Essential for MUST firefighters who handle forest fires, this module covers jungle survival, including finding food and water, treating injuries, and setting up shelter.

Tower module

Back at camp, candidates undergo rope training, abseiling, and winching exercises to simulate helicopter operations and build familiarity.

Helicopter operations module

Candidates receive training on helicopter discipline, applying the tower module skills to real helicopter operations.

=== Graduation ===
Upon successfully completing all modules, candidates must perform a final rescue operation in a swamp setting. Afterwards, they receive the MUST shoulder patch, presented by VIPs, marking their official induction.

=== Advanced training ===
After joining MUST, firefighters continue honing their skills through advanced courses at the Fire and Rescue Academy, including:

- Basic technical rope rescue course
- Basic rescue swimmer course (Helicopter)
- Advanced rescue swimmer course (Helicopter)
- Basic surface water rescue course

MUST firefighters can also apply for selections in more elite FRDM units, such as Special Air Unit (PASKUB) and the Smoke Jumper program, for further specialisation.
