= Special Tactical Operation and Rescue Team of Malaysia =

Specialised firefighters in Malaysia's Fire and Rescue Department

- Pasukan Khas Operasi, Taktikal dan Penyelamat Malaysia
- Founded: March 2011; 15 years ago
- Country: Malaysia
- Branch: Fire and Rescue Department of Malaysia
- Type: Special operations firefighter
- Role: Search and rescue: Technical rescue; Urban search and rescue; Ground (Lowland) search and rescue; Mountain rescue; Cave rescue; High-angle rescue and firefighting; Surface water rescue; Aircraft rescue and firefighting Jungle firefighting
- Size: 481 firefighters (as of September 2024)
- Part of: Fire and Rescue Operations Division
- Nicknames: "STORM", "Pasukan Khas STORM", "Komando Bomba" (English: Firefighters' Commando)
- Mottos: First In, Last Out; Pantas dan berani (English: Swift and daring)

Commanders
- Current commander: Senior Fire Superintendent I Alimaddia Bukri
- Notable commanders: Senior Fire Superintendent I Ismail Abd Ghani

The STORM (backronym: Special Tactical Operation and Rescue Team of Malaysia; Malay: Pasukan Khas Operasi, Taktikal dan Penyelamat Malaysia) is a specialised firefighter unit within the Fire and Rescue Department of Malaysia. They are one of the special rescue team of the department and also a component of the Rapid Deployment Forces.

STORM, along with Smoke Jumper and Special Air Unit (PASKUB), is regarded as the most elite rescue units in the Fire and Rescue Department of Malaysia (FRDM). STORM firefighters are often called upon for high-stakes rescue missions and representing Malaysia in international rescue competitions.

== History ==
=== Created as a special operations for West Malaysia ===
STORM was formed in March 2011. Their initial tasks were urban search and rescue (USAR) for the western Malaysian region, as well as helping the federal government's Heavy USAR task force, the SMART team. STORM's membership was originally limited to veteran firefighters from other FRDM Special Rescue Team (Malay: Pasukan Khas JBPM), such as the Water Rescue Unit, Emergency Medical Rescue Services Team, HAZMAT Team, and MUST.

=== Restructured to rapid deployment roles ===
Following the disappearance of Malaysia Airlines Flight 370 in March 2014, the FRDM restructured the existing STORM unit to include crashed aircraft search and rescue among its roles. The Director General of FRDM reorganises STORM, along with the Canine Unit (Malay: Unit Pengesan Bomba) and the Air Division (Malay: Bahagian Udara JBPM), into rapid deployment forces. They were stationed at Kuantan and Langkawi to quickly deploy to assist with the recovery of a crashed aircraft.

The operational area of the STORM unit was later expanded to include East Malaysia, and they are now stationed at major fire stations in all states.

=== Integration with MUSTeam ===
On 30 September 2024, in Kuching, Sarawak, Director General of FRDM, Datuk Nor Hisham Mohammad, announced plans to dissolve the Multi-Skill Team (MUST) and integrate its members into the Special Tactical Operation and Rescue Team of Malaysia (STORM). The decision was made to address overlapping roles between MUST and other specialised units, such as the Special Air Unit (PASKUB) and STORM.

As part of this transition, MUST firefighters are receiving additional urban search and rescue (USAR) training to align with STORM’s operations. This integration aims to optimise FRDM’s manpower and improve efficiency in response to large-scale disaster needs in Malaysia. Given the country's exposure to natural disasters, consolidating SAR resources under STORM is expected to enhance readiness and resource management. After the integration, all STORM firefighters will be trained in helicopter operations and jungle fire suppression, expanding their abilities in diverse environments. The integration will bring STORM’s strength to over 1,100 firefighters, making it comparable to a regiment-sized force by NATO standards.

=== Introduction of the new STORM beret ===
On 24 January 2025, for the first time in FRDM’s modern history, a new beret was officially introduced, and STORM firefighters were granted the honour of wearing it. The beret unveiling ceremony was held during the 2025 Annual FRDM Parade Ceremony.

In FRDM, the red beret symbolises that a firefighter has graduated from the Fire and Rescue Academy of Malaysia with at least a diploma in Fire Science. Consequently, all regular and reserve FRDM firefighters traditionally wear a red beret with a black cap badge backing (equivalent to the beret flash in the U.S. Army). (Note: Volunteer firefighters in Malaysia do not always wear red berets, as they are trained at state-level fire stations rather than the Fire and Rescue Academy of Malaysia.)

However, to distinguish STORM as an elite specialised unit, their cap badge backing has been changed to maroon, symbolising their role as a rapid deployment force.

== Structure ==
STORM firefighters are assigned to the FRDM's Fire and Rescue Operations Division (Malay: Bahagian Operasi Kebombaan dan Penyelamat) and are stationed at all major fire stations throughout Malaysia. In an emergency, they can be grouped quickly, depending on the scale of the situation. The FRDM aimed to place at least 30 STORM firefighters in each state.

STORM firefighters are often assisted by search and rescue dogs and their handlers from the Canine Unit.

=== USAR operations ===
USAR operations in Malaysia typically concern structural collapses and landslides. In missions related to USAR, STORM firefighters, Civil Defense Force's Special Rescue Team (PASPA), and Special Malaysian Disaster Assistance and Rescue Team's (SMART) USAR technicians will cooperate, assisted by other units and agencies. As of 2020, only SMART and STORM have the ability to stabilise a collapsed structure. SMART will install sensors and alarms, while STORM firefighters will enter the collapsed building to rescue trapped individuals.

==== MAS 10 USAR Task force ====
During the 2023 Turkey–Syria earthquake, Malaysia sent two USAR task forces to Turkey to assist. The first task force, MAS 01, comprised 64 SMART USAR technicians and 6 FRDM firefighters from the FRDM Canine Unit. The second task force, MAS 10, included 30 STORM firefighters, 20 SMART USAR technicians, 20 PASPA USAR technicians, and 3 media staff. MAS 10 was led by Senior Fire Superintendent I Abdul Manaf Che Isa. They spent two weeks there conducting rescue operations.

=== Other search and rescue operations ===
In the standard operating procedure for search and rescue operations, FRDM will dispatch a SAR team comprising STORM firefighters as the main rescue unit, MUST firefighters to support STORM and serve as ground crew if a helicopter is required, a Water Rescue Unit to assist with water rescues, and an Emergency Medical Rescue Services Team for medical support. If the initial small team is unable to resolve the mission, a larger team will be assembled at the location.

== Responsibilities ==
STORM was originally tasked with USAR, landslide rescue, high-rise rescue and firefighting, and jungle firefighting. Because of the higher concentration of high-rise buildings in West Malaysia at the time, their field of operations was limited to that region. Their roles were later expanded to include various types of operations, such as downed aircraft rescue, surface water rescue, and cave rescue, and they now cover the entire region of Malaysia. Their jobs are similar to those of SMART, but they are overseen by the FRDM and the Ministry of Housing and Local Government.

STORM is responsible for the FRDM's Pusat Kecemerlangan Runtuhan Struktur dan Tanah Runtuh (English: Centre of Excellence for Structural Collapse and Landslides), a training facility for USAR operations. STORM is also in charge of training the MOCSAR, an elite unit composed of auxiliary firefighters (Malay: Pegawai Bomba Bantuan – PBB) specialising in mountain and cave rescue in Sarawak.

When there are no operations that require STORM capabilities, the STORM firefighters serve as ordinary firefighters at the station where they are stationed.

== Identities ==
=== Red beret with maroon cap badge backing ===
Since 2025, all STORM firefighters wear the standard red FRDM beret but with a maroon cap badge backing, distinguishing them from other FRDM personnel, who use a black backing. While the maroon beret is internationally recognised as a symbol of elite airborne units, the maroon cap badge backing serves as an identifier that STORM firefighters are an elite unit and part of Malaysia’s Rapid Deployment Force.

=== STORM's shoulder patch ===
Every elite unit in FRDM has their own distinctive shoulder patch. The patch symbolised their ability as specialist fire fighters. The STORM's shoulder patch comprises crossed fire axes, a tactical dagger, a figure 8 descent control device, a ribbon with the phrase "Pantas dan Berani" (English: Swift and daring) and a lightning bolt.

=== Red technical rescue USAR helmet ===
The red technical rescue USAR helmets were initially used by the Malaysian SMART team. STORM, as a protégé of SMART in USAR operations, gets training at SMART's headquarters. They later adopt the red helmet as one of their identities. Today, SMART members donned blue technical rescue USAR helmets while STORM and a few FRDM Special Rescue Teams continued to utilize red helmets.

=== STORM operation's uniform ===
Every elite unit in FRDM has a distinctive uniform to make them easily distinguishable during operations. Originally, their outfit simply featured reflective strips. It has subsequently evolved, and currently, there is reflective "STORM" lettering at the back of their outfit.

== Selection and training ==
The STORM is regarded as the toughest unit in the FRDM. The STORM firefighters are expected to be stronger and more mentally tough than the rest of the regular firefighters. They are trained to operate and survive in a variety of environments, including cities, jungles, swamps, mountains, seas and rivers. They were also exposed to a wide range of sophisticated rescue equipment. STORM's membership was originally limited to veteran firefighters, but it is now open to everyone, including firefighters fresh out of basic training.

=== STORM selection program (2 days) ===
Also known as Pemilihan Pasukan Special Tactical Operation Rescue Malaysia in Malay, the STORM selection program lasts two days and is held at a designated fire station. For instance, firefighters from Kuala Lumpur, Selangor, Perak, and Putrajaya participate in the selection at Putrajaya. STORM seeks members who are not only physically strong but also able to perform well under pressure during operations. Firefighters must complete tasks, including:

- 7 kilometres (4.3 mi) run within 45 minutes
- An Individual Competency Test
- The BEEP test
- BA (Breathing Apparatus) endurance while carrying a 20 kilograms (44 lb) load (Note: BA is an abbreviation for breathing apparatus. STORM applicants must complete all physical ability tests while using breathing apparatus. This is not the same as the physical ability exam administered by some fire departments in the United States.)

=== STORM Special Course (4 weeks) ===
The official name of this course in Malay is Kursus Khas STORM, also called Kursus Asas Pasukan Khas STORM, and it lasts for four weeks. Currently offered at the Fire and Rescue Academy Malaysia (FRAM) in Wakaf Tapai, Terengganu, it is the longest and most physically and mentally demanding basic course among the FRDM Special Rescue Teams. Serving as an entrance exam for STORM, the course has a high dropout rate. In 2019, only 39 of 423 firefighters passed the course, a success rate of about 7%. This course is also open to women, and as of 2024, nine female firefighters have completed it.

The course is divided into two phases.

- Phase One lasts two weeks and takes place mainly within the training camp. Candidates undergo testing on fundamental skills and theory required for firefighting and are introduced to STORM operations. Physical exercise is intense and ongoing throughout this phase.
- Phase Two takes place outdoors for the remaining two weeks and focuses on survival skills and rigorous physical training. Some of the tasks in this phase include:
  - A 23 kilometres (14 mi) casualty evacuation with a stretcher (teams of six candidates per stretcher)
  - Jungle and swamp survival training
  - Completing a 2.4 kilometres (1.5 mi) run within 13 minutes, wearing full firefighting gear, and carrying an additional 20 kilograms (44 lb)
  - An 18 kilometres (11 mi) forced march while carrying a 70 kilograms (150 lb) load

Candidates who complete all of the assessments at the end of this course will be awarded with a STORM patch during the passing out ceremony.

=== Advanced training ===
Firefighters who have completed the STORM Special Course are considered STORM members. However, to remain in the unit, they must also complete STORM advanced training.

==== Compulsory STORM advanced trainings ====
The mandatory advanced training was not done in a row, but rather in phases. The majority of the advanced training listed here is only available to STORM firefighters. Each course is conducted at FRAM and normally has two levels: basic and advanced. Among the training that STORM firefighters must do are the following:

- Rope rescue course (Intermediate level) — 1 week
- Structural Collapse Rescue Course (Intermediate level) — 1 week
- Basic Surface Rescue Swimmer Course — 1 week
- Advanced Surface Rescue Swimmer Course — 1 week
- Jungle and swamp survival (Advance) (Malay: Kursus Survival STORM) (Note: STORM firemen must march for 23 kilometres (14 mi) on foot and swim for 3 kilometres (1.9 mi) in the sea before surviving in the swamp and jungle for ten days. They only had a machete, a camping fry pan, a torchlight, and a pant.) — 2 weeks
- Wilderness Search and Rescue — 1 week
- Safety and discipline in airborne operations (Malay: Kursus Tatacara Berkerja Dengan Pesawat) — 1 week
- Coxswain's Course for Small Boats (Basic level) (Malay: Kursus Asas Jurumudi Bot) — 1 week

==== Non-compulsory advanced trainings ====
Aside from the mandatory STORM advanced training, STORM firefighters can also enrol in courses offered to all FRDM Special Rescue Teams. Among the courses are the following:

- Basic rescue swimmer (Helicopter) — 1 week
- Advanced rescue swimmer (Helicopter) — 1 week
- Basic tactical helicopter rescue course — 1 week
- Advanced tactical helicopter rescue course — 1 week
- Basic aircraft marshaller (Helicopter) course — 1 week
- Advanced aircraft marshaller (Helicopter) course — 1 week
- Air quartermaster course — 13 weeks

Other courses that are not affiliated with the FRDM Special Rescue Teams are also available to STORM firefighters. Among the courses are the following:

- Diver course
- Venomous animals and snakes handling course (Basic) (Malay: Kursus Asas Pengendalian Ular) — 1 week
- Venomous animals and snakes handling course (Advance) (Malay: Kursus Peningkatan Kemahiran dan Pengetahuan Menangkap Haiwan Berbisa) — 3 weeks

=== STORM Refresher Training ===
The Latihan Pengukuhan STORM (STORM Refresher Training) is held regularly, particularly during thunderstorm and flood seasons, and lasts for five days. STORM firefighters undergo intense physical exercises, leaving them physically exhausted before moving on to operational tests. These exercises include high-rise and mountain rescues, urban search and rescue (USAR), and landslide rescue. This training also serves to evaluate teamwork among STORM firefighters under stressful conditions. The STORM Refresher Training is conducted at the states level.

=== Individual Physical Proficiency Test ===
This test is conducted twice a year to ensure that the STORM firefighters are physically fit for any operation. STORM firefighters who are not physically fit are at risk of being removed from the unit.

== Equipment ==
=== Rescue vehicles ===
In 2022, the Fire and Rescue Department of Malaysia announced the purchase of five specialised rescue vehicles for STORM's USAR missions, with a total investment of approximately RM 7.5 million, including equipment. These vehicles are set to arrive in stages from 2023 to 2024. The first USAR vehicle was unveiled to the public during the 2023 Independence Day Parade in Putrajaya.

== Future plans ==
=== INSARAG Accreditation ===
The International Search and Rescue Advisory Group (INSARAG) is a global network of countries and organisations under the United Nations Office for the Coordination of Humanitarian Affairs (UNOCHA). Established in 1991, it aims to enhance international coordination and standards for Urban Search and Rescue (USAR) teams responding to disasters, particularly earthquakes and building collapses.

STORM's mentor unit, the SMART team, achieved INSARAG External Classification (IEC) certification as a Heavy USAR team in 2016, becoming the 46th team worldwide to receive this classification.

Since 2012, FRDM has planned for STORM to pursue INSARAG accreditation, likely under the Light or Medium USAR class. However, as of 2025, there are no updates in the UNOCHA database indicating that STORM has obtained IEC accreditation in any classification.

=== STORM's hazard pay ===
In 2018, the government is planning to give an allowance to STORM firefighters due to their harsh work of nature and training. This is comparable to the hazard pay obtained by commando units in Malaysia, known as "Commando allowances", and also to paratroopers in the Malaysian Army, known as "Parachute allowances".

=== STORM's special operations fire stations ===
Senior Fire Superintendent I Abdul Manaf Che Isa, the commander of MAS10, revealed in an interview with New Straits Times, that the Fire and Rescue Department of Malaysia (FRDM) plans to build six special operations fire stations exclusively for STORM. These stations will be located in six different regions throughout Malaysia and will serve as bases and headquarters for STORM units in those areas.

=== Rescue vehicle ===
Apart from the five rescue vehicles that STORM is expected to receive by 2024, the FRDM is planning to acquire one more USAR rescue vehicle, thus making the total number of rescue vehicles for STORM's usage six. All of these rescue vehicles are intended to be stationed at fire stations that belong to STORM.

== Notable members ==
=== Abu Zarin Hussin ===
Senior Fire Officer II Abu Zarin bin Hussin was a renowned Malaysian firefighter and snake-catcher who gained international recognition after being mistakenly identified as a Thai man who married his pet king cobra. He appeared on Season 2 of Asia's Got Talent showcasing his exceptional skill in handling venomous snakes.

Born into a family of snake-catchers, Abu Zarin was the fourth child of a snake-catcher and eventually became the head instructor for venomous animal and snake handling courses at Fire and Rescue Academies (FRAM). His career in the FRDM saw him serve in several elite units, including the Multi-Skill Team (MUST) and the Water Rescue Unit, before he went through STORM selection and passed the STORM Special Course in December 2013. He also founded the Skuad King Cobra JBPM (FRDM King Cobra Squad), a specialist team tasked with capturing dangerous snakes and training firefighters, government agencies, and the public in safe snake-handling practices.

On 13 March 2018, while off duty, Abu Zarin responded to a call to catch a king cobra, accompanied by his wife. Tragically, the snake bit through a bag he was holding, injuring him on the hand. He was quickly taken to the hospital, but he succumbed to the effects of the venom on 16 March 2018, three days after falling into a coma. For his bravery and service, he was posthumously promoted to the rank of Senior Fire Officer II (Malay: Pegawai Bomba Kanan II) on 2 April 2018.

=== Safiq Mohamad ===
Senior Fire Officer II Safiq bin Mohamad is a YouTuber, STORM firefighter, and snake-handling instructor. A member of the first batch trained by Abu Zarin Hussin, Safiq is renowned for his expertise in handling snakes. He is also part of the FRDM King Cobra Squad, and his snake-catching skills are featured on the squad's official YouTube channel (Link). Currently, he serves as the chief instructor for venomous animal and snake-handling courses at the Fire and Rescue Academy of Malaysia.

=== Shafiq Mohamad ===
Fire Officer Shafiq Mohamad, known as "Apit SW" on social media, is a notable member of the STORM. A social media influencer, Shafiq actively shares his experiences, training, and daily responsibilities as a STORM firefighter on his social media platforms, including apit.sw and APIT SW CHANNEL.

In November 2023, Shafiq, along with four other STORM firefighters—Deputy Fire Superintendent I Baharum Mohamad Hasim, Senior Fire Officer II Umar Farook Saadon, Fire Officer Mohd Fadzil Mohd Jamal, and Fire Officer Eril Smith Nan—represented FRDM at the 2023 Singapore-Global Firefighter & Paramedic Challenge. Competing against 14 teams from 12 countries, Shafiq and his team emerged as the overall champions.

=== Syahidi Hamidun ===
Senior Fire Officer I Syahidi Hamidun is a Malaysian firefighter, YouTuber, and member of the STORM. Syahidi is also the younger brother of Hafiz Hamidun, a prominent Malaysian singer and composer. Prior to joining STORM, Syahidi served in the Smoke Jumper.

On his YouTube channel, S.H. Channel, Syahidi shares insights into STORM's operations, profiles of other FRDM units, and various personal interests. One notable video, which highlighted an operation to rescue people trapped in a collapsed condominium site in Taman Desa, Kuala Lumpur in February 2020, was even featured on TV1's Selamat Pagi Malaysia program.

== In popular culture ==
- 2015: "Abang Bomba I Love You", a romantic novel by Mia Kiff, is about a teenage girl falling in love with her saviour, a firefighter. The main male character, Rayqal, is represented as a STORM and Water Rescue Unit firefighter. ISBN 9789673692958
- 2016: "Abang Bomba I Love You", a romantic series by Global Station, is based on the 2015 novel of the same name. The series is aired on the Astro Ria channel. Starring by Hisyam Hamid and Amira Othman.
