= Fire and Rescue Academy of Malaysia =

Higher education school in Malaysia

- Akademi Bomba dan Penyelamat Malaysia
- Former names: Sekolah Latihan Bomba Malayan Union (1957); Pusat Latihan Bomba (1958–1997)
- Type: Public
- Established: 1957
- Affiliations: Fire and Rescue Department of Malaysia
- Officer in charge: Senior Assistant Fire Commissioner Md Ali Ismail, Assistant Director General of the Training
- Location: Malaysia
- Campus: 470.6 acres (190.4 ha) (For 5 campuses); Multiple sites
- Website: fram.bomba.gov.my

The Fire and Rescue Academy of Malaysia (Abbr.: FRAM; Malay: Akademi Bomba dan Penyelamat Malaysia) is a tertiary education institution in Malaysia that specialises in fire and safety education and training. The Fire and Rescue Department of Malaysia manages the academy, and enrollment is open to the general public. The institution offers education up through the advanced diploma level. FRAM has five campuses located around Malaysia.

== History ==
=== 1940: Origin ===
Formal firefighting training and curriculum were first introduced in Malaysia in Penang in 1940. The British Military Administration is in charge of the training, and A. J. Brown was appointed as its first officer in command. The trainers have a total of 150 personnel. In 1952, the Jemaah Pemeriksa Perkhidmatan Bomba ('Fire Service Inspectorate Board') standardised all fire department training in Malaya. They do not have permanent training facilities at this time, so they move from one fire station to another to train the firefighters.

=== 1957: First school ===
The first permanent firefighting school was established in Gombak, Selangor, in 1957. It was known as the Sekolah Latihan Bomba Malayan Union ('Fire School of Malayan Union'). Lieutenant Colonel Watkins was the school's first commandant. At the time, the Fire Services Inspectorate Panels were in charge of the school. It was used by the military, state fire agencies, and public workers to learn how to fight fires.

=== 1972: Larger training centre ===
To meet the growing demand for firefighters in Malaysia, a new fire training centre was established in Kuala Kubu Bharu in 1972. The school, known as Pusat Latihan Bomba Malaysia Kuala Kubu Bharu ('Malaysian Firefighter Training Centre Kuala Kubu Bharu'), was constructed on 13 acres of land. Before the training centres were renamed the current name in 1997, two more training centres were built.

=== 1997: Renamed to the Fire and Rescue Academy of Malaysia ===
The centre's present name was adopted on 8 January 1997. This change corresponds to the formal renaming of the 'Malaysian Fire Services Department' to the 'Fire and Rescue Department of Malaysia'.

== Functions and roles ==
The Fire and Rescue Academy of Malaysia (FRAM) and its campuses are tasked with providing formal education in fire and safety, both practical and theoretical, to its students. Except for the Malaysian Volunteer Fire Brigade, all members of the Fire and Rescue Department of Malaysia (FRDM) and Malaysian Auxiliary Fire Brigade are required to be trained at FRAM. The academy's primary functions are as follows:

- Plan and carry out in-service training for officers and personnel of the fire service under the fire service-based system. (Training Policies 1986 and 1992; and the New Pension System Memorandum 63/138KH.I PSD (15) 1994)
- Implement fire safety training for the public sector. (User services Chapter 8, Session 2 (a), (b), and (c))
- Designing and implementing firefighter training for ASEAN and Third World nations. (Malaysian Technical Cooperation Program, Technical Assistance Program)
- Designing and executing training for Building Fire Safety Officers (Industrial & Commercial). (Act 341, the Fire Services Act 1988; Section 62 (1) c)
- Plan, supervise, and administer service assessments and special examinations for the purpose of promotion for each service scheme.

== Campuses ==
The FRAM has five campuses that are named after the regions in which they are located. Only the FRAM Central Region campus offers courses to international students. Aside from that, the FRAM Eastern Region campus is Asia's largest fire training and teaching institution. The five campuses are as follows:

Name (English)	Name (Malay)	Location	Year established	Campus size	Students capacity
FRAM Central Region	FRAM Wilayah Tengah	Kuala Kubu Bharu, Selangor	1972	13 acres (5.3 ha)	260
FRAM Sarawak Region	FRAM Sarawak	Kuching, Sarawak	1982	9 acres (3.6 ha)	100
FRAM Sabah Region	FRAM Sabah	Kota Kinabalu, Sabah	1986	2.6 acres (1.1 ha)	150
FRAM Eastern Region	FRAM Wilayah Timur	Wakaf Tapai, Marang, Terengganu	2002	355 acres (144 ha)	700
FRAM Northern Region	FRAM Wilayah Utara	Tronoh, Perak	2014	91 acres (37 ha)	50

== Courses available ==
FRAM offers five different departments of specialisation. Some courses are only open to specific units, while some are available to the general public. The departments are as follows:

=== Department of Fire Suppression Studies ===
The School of Operations was the name given to Department of Fire Suppression Studies. The primary objective of this department is to instruct and train firefighters in fire suppression skills and procedures. Aside from that, this department is responsible for educating firefighters about any firefighting improvements. The following are some of the courses offered through this department:

Course's name	Offered to
Fire suppression techniques training	All firefighters
Structure fire suppression training	All firefighters
Fire pump handling and maintenance	All firefighters
Fire engine and equipment handling and maintenance	All firefighters
Emergency vehicle driving course (Fire engine)	All firefighters
Breathing apparatus handling and maintenance	All firefighters
Firefighting simulation training	All firefighters
Special Offensive Firefighting Team (SOFT) course	All firefighters

=== Department of Rescue Studies ===
The Rescue Studies department was previously a part of the School of Operations before being separated to focus exclusively on teaching rescue capabilities. The School of Operations was later renamed the Department of fire suppression studies The majority of the courses offered here are exclusive to FRDM's special operations firefighters. The following are some of the courses offered through this department:

Course's name	Offered to
STORM special course	All firefighters
MUST Team basic course	All firefighters
MUST Team refresher training	MUST Team
Basic rescue swimmer course (Helicopter)	All FRDM's special units
Advanced rescue swimmer course (Helicopter)	All FRDM's special units
Advanced rescue swimmer course (Helicopter) (Instructor)	All FRDM's special units
Basic vehicle extrication course	All firefighters
Vehicle extrication course	All firefighters
Basic scuba course	All firefighters
Scuba divers course	Water Rescue Unit
Advanced scuba diver course	Water Rescue Unit
Advanced water diver course (Instructor)	FRAM's Instructors
Basic surface water rescue course	All firefighters
Intermediate surface water rescue course	STORM
Handling and rescuing using small boat	All firefighters
Venomous animals and snakes handling course (Basic)	All firefighters
Venomous animals and snakes handling course (Advance)	All firefighters

Course's name	Offered to
Introduction to HAZMAT and CBRNe	All firefighters
HAZMAT course - 1st responder	All firefighters
Advanced HAZMAT course	HAZMAT Team
Advanced HAZMAT course (Commander)	HAZMAT Team
Basic technical rope rescue course	All firefighters
Intermediate technical rope rescue course	STORM
Cave rescue course	STORM
Jungle and swamp survival course (Advance)	STORM & Canine Unit
Wilderness Search and Rescue	STORM
Collapse structure rescue - 1st responder	All firefighters
Intermediate collapse structure rescue	STORM
Safety and discipline in airborne operations	STORM
Basic tactical helicopter rescue course	All FRDM's special units
Helicopter crash survival training (Water & Land)	All firefighters
Basic helicopter landing assistant course	All firefighters
Advanced helicopter landing assistant course	All FRDM's special units
Air quartermaster course	All FRDM's special units

=== Department of Fire Management Studies ===
Fire Management Studies is a department that teaches a wide range of subjects. They provided education in areas such as IT, sports science, administration, logistics, music, and many more. This is FRAM's sole department that offers courses up to the diploma level. The following are some of the courses offered through this department:

Course's name	Offered to
Advanced diploma in Fire Science	New recruit
Diploma in Fire Science	New recruit
Certificate in Fire Science	New recruit
Basic fire supervisor course	All firefighters
Fire stations management course	All firefighters
Disaster management course	All firefighters
Incident Commander Level 1	Senior firefighters
Incident Commander Level 2	Senior firefighters
ISO Internal Auditor Course	Assistant Fire Superintendent and above

Course's name	Offered to
IT technician course	All firefighters
Data entry course	All firefighters
Certificate in Sports Science	All firefighters
Physical training instructor course	Senior firefighters
Vocational Training Operation (VTO) course	All firefighters
Drill instructor course	Senior firefighters
Advanced musician course	All firefighters
Basic musician (Brass band) course	All firefighters

=== Department of Fire Safety Studies ===
Fire Safety Studies is a fire prevention-focused department. This department is also in charge of law enforcement education pertaining to Undang-Undang Kecil Bangunan Seragam 1984-Pindaan 2012, which is mostly related to licensing and regulations. This department regularly holds seminars and workshops to educate the public on fire safety and awareness. The following are some of the courses offered through this department:

Course's name	Offered to
Basic fire prevention course	All firefighters
Basic fire prevention course (Structural)	All firefighters
Intermediate fire prevention course	All firefighters
Licensing officer course	All firefighters
Civilian's fire prevention course	Public

=== Department of Fire Investigation Studies ===
The Fire Investigation Studies was formerly known as the FRDM's Centre for the Study of Law. The FRDM's legal department in Putrajaya was originally in charge of the fire investigation. Fire investigation activities were previously handled by the FRDM's headquarters, but due to recent changes, each state's branch now has its own fire investigation team. Today, the headquarters is still mostly in charge of legal matters, but each branch's fire investigation team is in charge of forensics and law enforcement. This department is in charge of providing legal and law enforcement education to all firefighters. The following are some of the courses offered through this department:

Course's name	Offered to
Basic fire forensics course	All firefighters
Intermediate fire forensics course	All firefighters
Law enforcement programs	All firefighters
Forensics photography course	All firefighters
