= New York City Fire Department Rescue Company 1 =

Special Operations rescue company of FDNY (Founded 1915)

- Address: 530 W 43rd Street, New York
- Coordinates: 40.760771°N 73.996522°W

Agency overview
- Established: March 8, 1915
- Employees: 25
- First Officer in Charge: Capt. - John J. McElligott
- First Deputy Officer: Lt.- Edwin A. Hotchkiss
- Motto: "Outstanding"

Facilities and equipment
- Stations: 1
- Rescues: 1
- Fireboats: 1 inflatable

New York City Fire Department Rescue Company 1, also known as Rescue 1, is one of five special operations rescue companies of the New York City Fire Department (FDNY) that responds to rescue operations requiring specialized equipment and training.

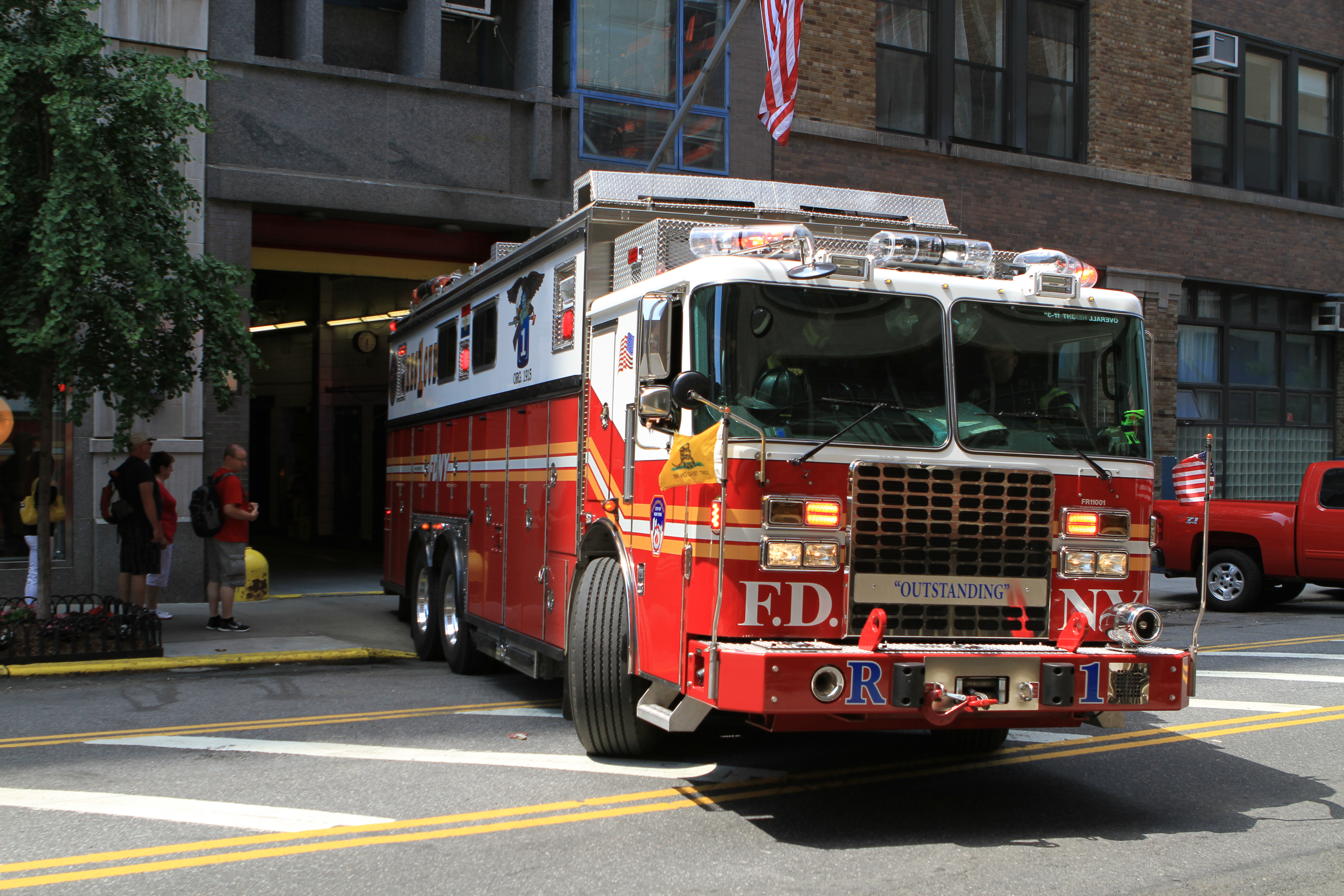
Rescue 1's current truck, a 2011 Ferrara Heavy Rescue

== Organization ==
The members of rescue companies receive extensive training in courses from the Special Operations Command (SOC) of the FDNY. Members typically have many years of experience within the FDNY and/or other fields of emergency operations. The rescue companies prioritise tools and equipment for rescuing civilians and firefighters at structural fires, as well as operating at "odd jobs".

Early versions of self-contained breathing apparatus (SCBA) were first assigned to the rescue companies. Heavy duty lifting equipment, torches, and saws were first introduced to the rescue companies. Lyle guns were among the initial equipment used by rescue companies. As technology evolved, the rescue companies pioneered the fire service application of artificial resuscitation techniques, SCBA, and firefighting foam. Rescue 1 is staffed with one captain, three lieutenants, and typically 25 to 30 firefighters, split into tours (shifts).

== Coverage ==
Rescue 1 services the New York City borough of Manhattan, below 116th Street in East Harlem and 125th Street in Morningside Heights and Harlem. Rescue 3 in the Bronx covers the areas of far northern Manhattan. Rescue 1's firehouse is located on 530 West 43rd Street, in the Hell's Kitchen neighborhood.

== History ==
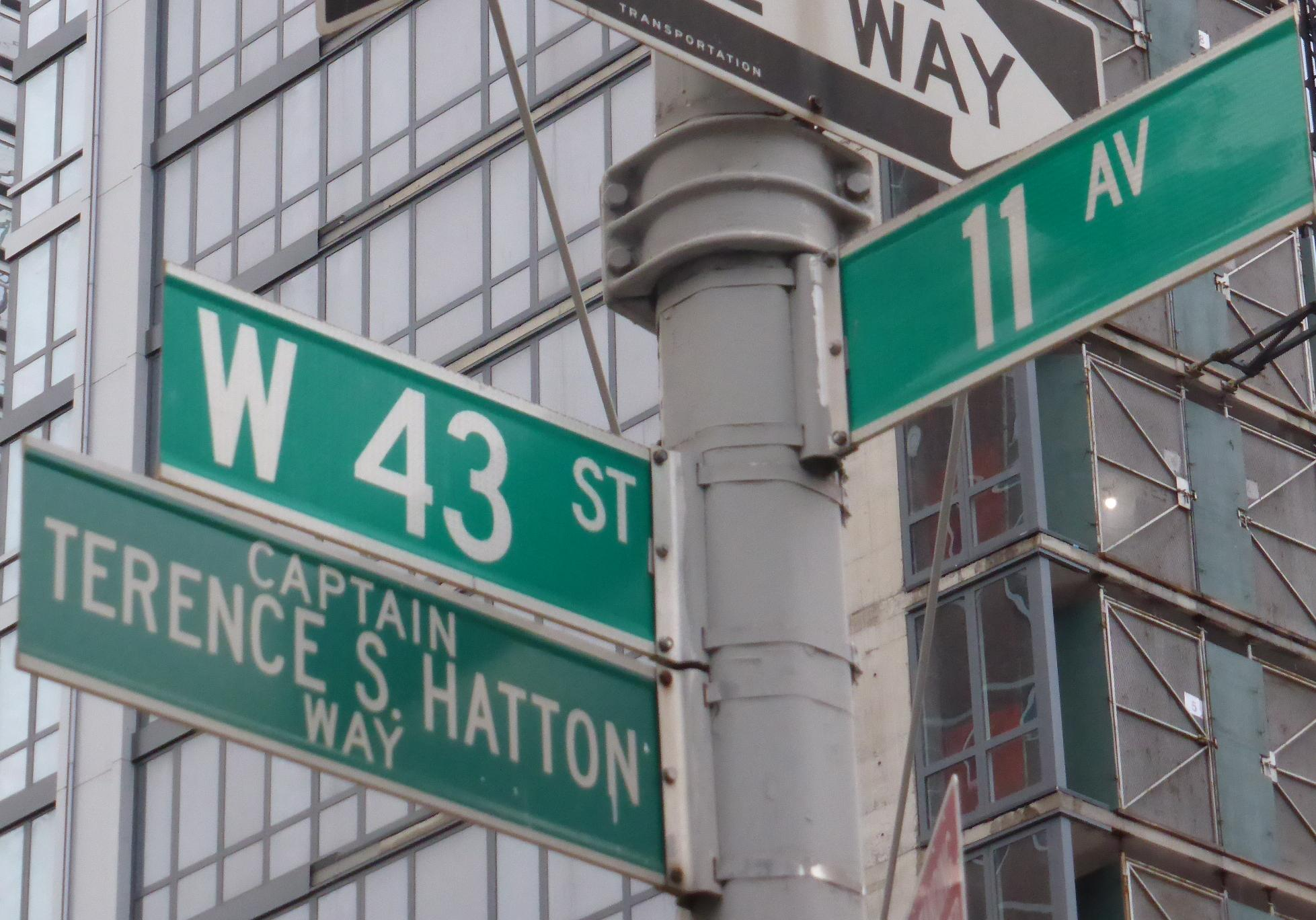
Terence S. Hatton Way street sign

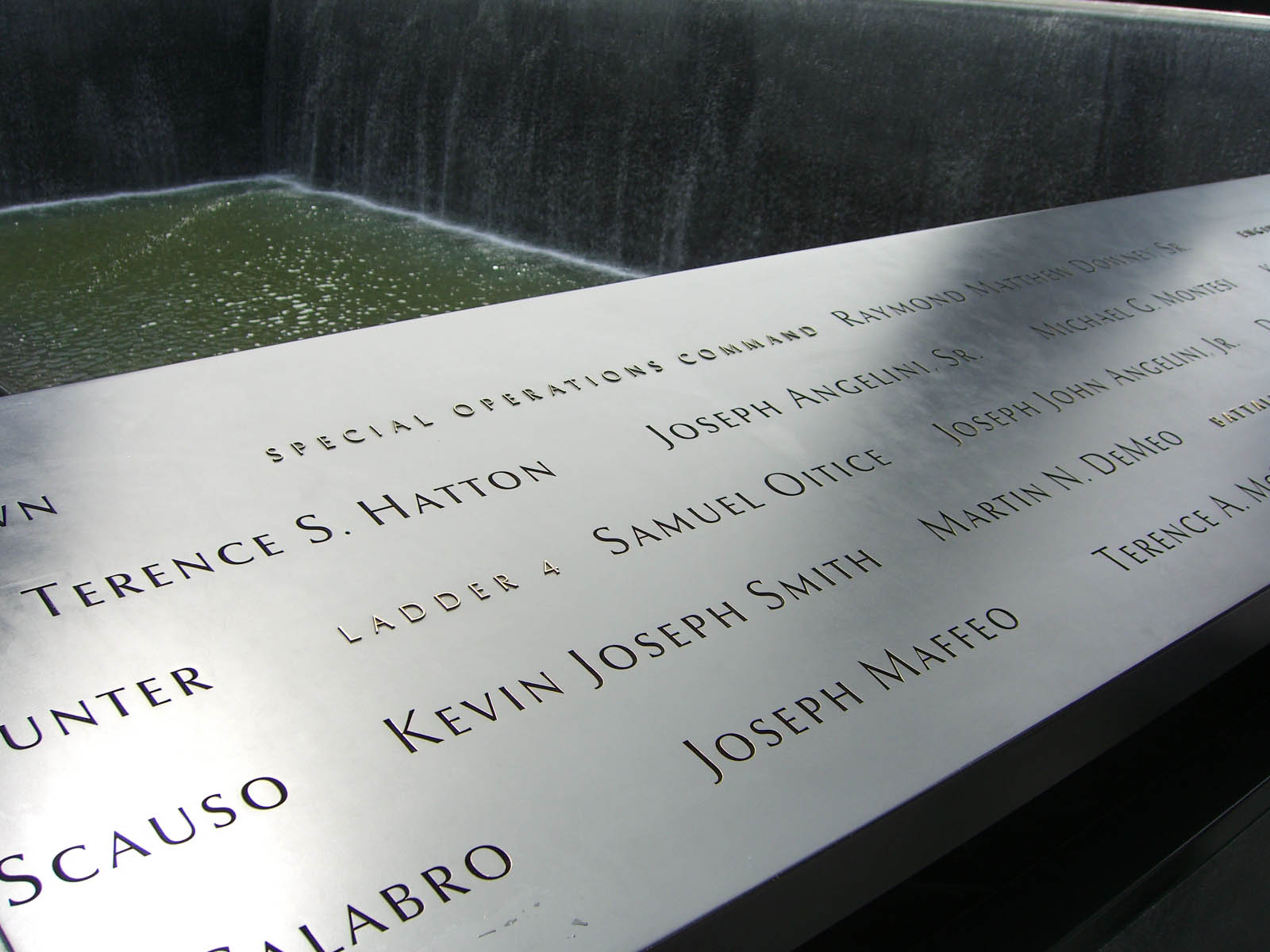
Names of fallen Rescue 1 members, on panel S-9 of the South Pool of the National September 11 Memorial

Rescue Company 1 was organized on March 8, 1915. The first officer in charge of Rescue Company 1 was then Captain John J. McElligott and Lieutenant Edwin A. Hotchkiss.

Rescue 1's firehouse was destroyed in 1985 by a fire in a neighboring warehouse. Rescue 1 was already out on a call when fire collapsed the warehouse onto their quarters. The unit then temporarily relocated until 1989 when their present firehouse was finished. Their distinctive door was saved and relocated to the back of the building.

On May 14, 1991, Lieutenant Patrick Brown led firefighters from Rescue 1 in performing two rope rescues at a fire in a 12-story building in Times Square, safely removing two occupants from the top floor windows in front of television cameras and hundreds of onlookers on the street below. Considered to be "one of the most spectacular fire rescues ever captured on film", the double roof rescue was featured in the television series Rescue 911 (Episode 3.10).

During the September 11 attacks, the company responded to the North Tower, and lost nearly half its company. Captain Terry Hatton led 10 members of Rescue 1 into the stairwell of the North Tower that morning. A 20 year veteran and one of the most decorated members in FDNY history, Hatton had earned 19 medals for bravery including the Medal of Honor. Nicknamed "Capt. Man Hatton" for his encyclopedic knowledge of Manhattan's buildings, he had previously led the company's FEMA task force deployments after the Oklahoma City bombing and the TWA Flight 800 crash. Of the 11 members of Rescue 1 who perished that day, Hatton's body was recovered on September 28, 2001. His wife Elizabeth Petrone Hatton, executive assistant to Mayor Giuliani, was on the steps of City Hall when the North Tower collapsed. She learned the following day that she was pregnant; their daughter Terri was born in 2002. In the 2002 documentary 9/11, they are one of first units entering the stairwell of the building. In 2002, rescue trucks designed by the company's captain Terry Hatton, who died in the attacks, were incorporated into the department's fleet, with his characteristic exclamation, "Outstanding", printed on the front of Rescue 1's vehicle. The subsequent 2007 Pierce rig had the same inscription with "T.H." added next to the motto. In 2005, the section of West 43rd Street between Tenth and Eleventh Avenues where the company's firehouse is located was named Terence S. Hatton Way.

Rescue 1 celebrated their centennial on March 8, 2015.
