= New York City Fire Department Squad Company 1 =

Special operations firefighting squad

Coordinates: 40.6747°N 73.9766°W

Agency overview
- Established: 1955
- Employees: 25

Facilities and equipment
- Stations: 788 Union St Brooklyn, NY 11215
- Engines: 1

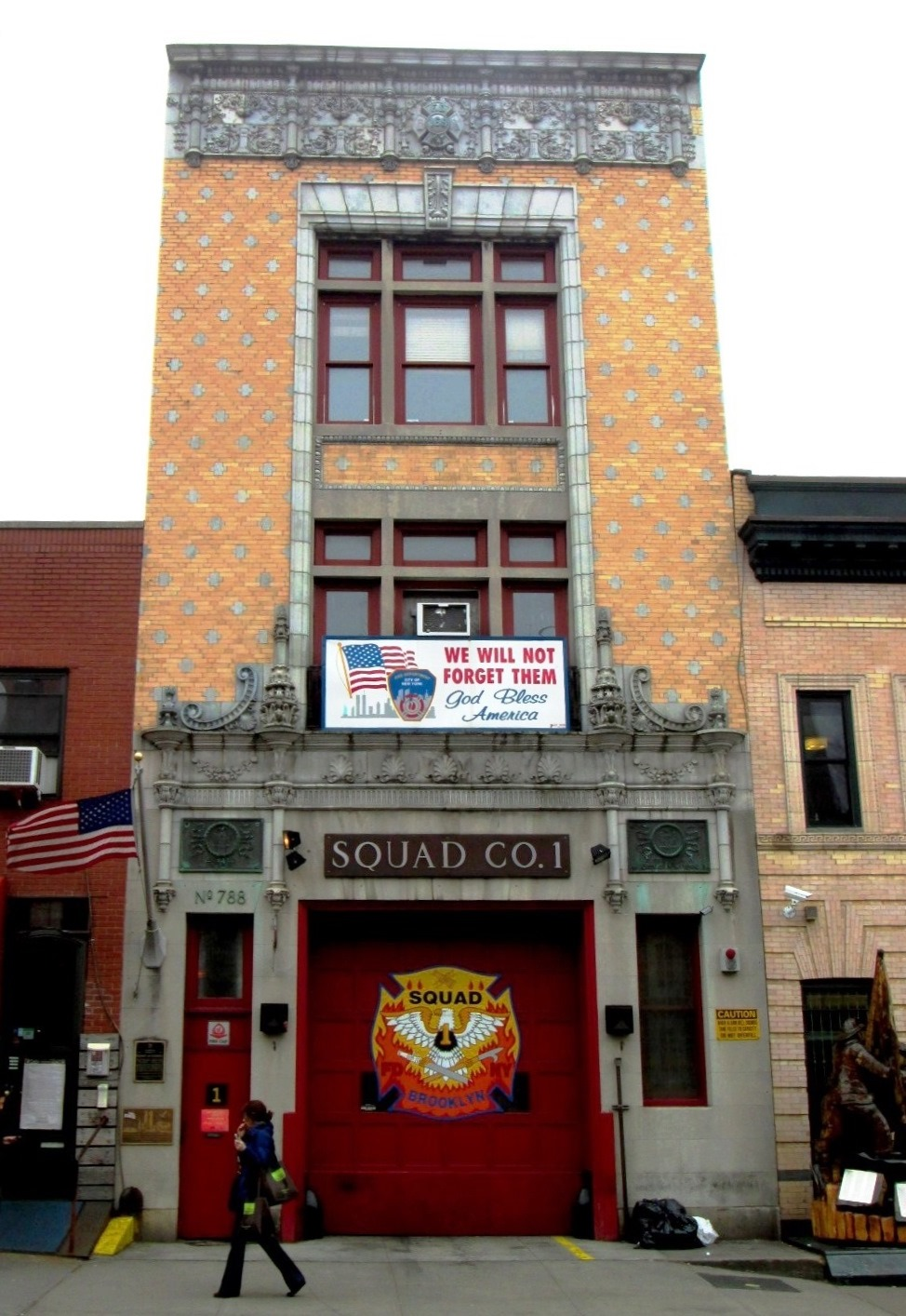
The Squad's station house

New York City Fire Department Squad Company 1, also known as Squad 1, is one of eight special operations squads in the New York City Fire Department's (FDNY) Special Operations Command (SOC). Squad 1 responds to fires and other emergencies throughout New York City, operating primarily in Brooklyn from their station in the Park Slope neighborhood. They operate a Seagrave fire engine with a 1000 gallon-per-minute pump and a 500-gallon water tank. As of September 2007, four officers and twenty-five men were assigned to the company.

== Responsibilities ==
Squad 1 responds as an engine in its first, second and third due assignments and as a Squad Company to working fires, high angle, collapse, confined space, subway emergencies and hazardous material emergencies in Brooklyn and throughout the city as needed.

== History ==
Squad 1 was first organized in Harlem at Engine Company 59 in 1955, moved to the Bronx at Ladder Company 58 in 1972, then to Engine Company 45 in 1975 and then disbanded in 1976.

Squad 1 was re-established in 1977 in Brooklyn at 788 Union Street, the former quarters of Engine Company 269, which had been closed during the budget crisis. The local community had placed great pressure on the city to reopen the former house of Engine 269 and the city responded by reopening it and making it the new quarters for Squad 1.

During the September 11 attacks, Squad 1 crossed the Brooklyn-Battery Tunnel to respond to the attacks. 12 members died when the towers collapsed; they were last seen in the South Tower of the World Trade Center. The door of their pumper engine was recovered and is now on display at the Smithsonian National Museum of American History. At the National 9/11 Memorial, the names of Squad Company 1 members killed in the attacks are located at the South Pool, on Panels S-6 and S-7.

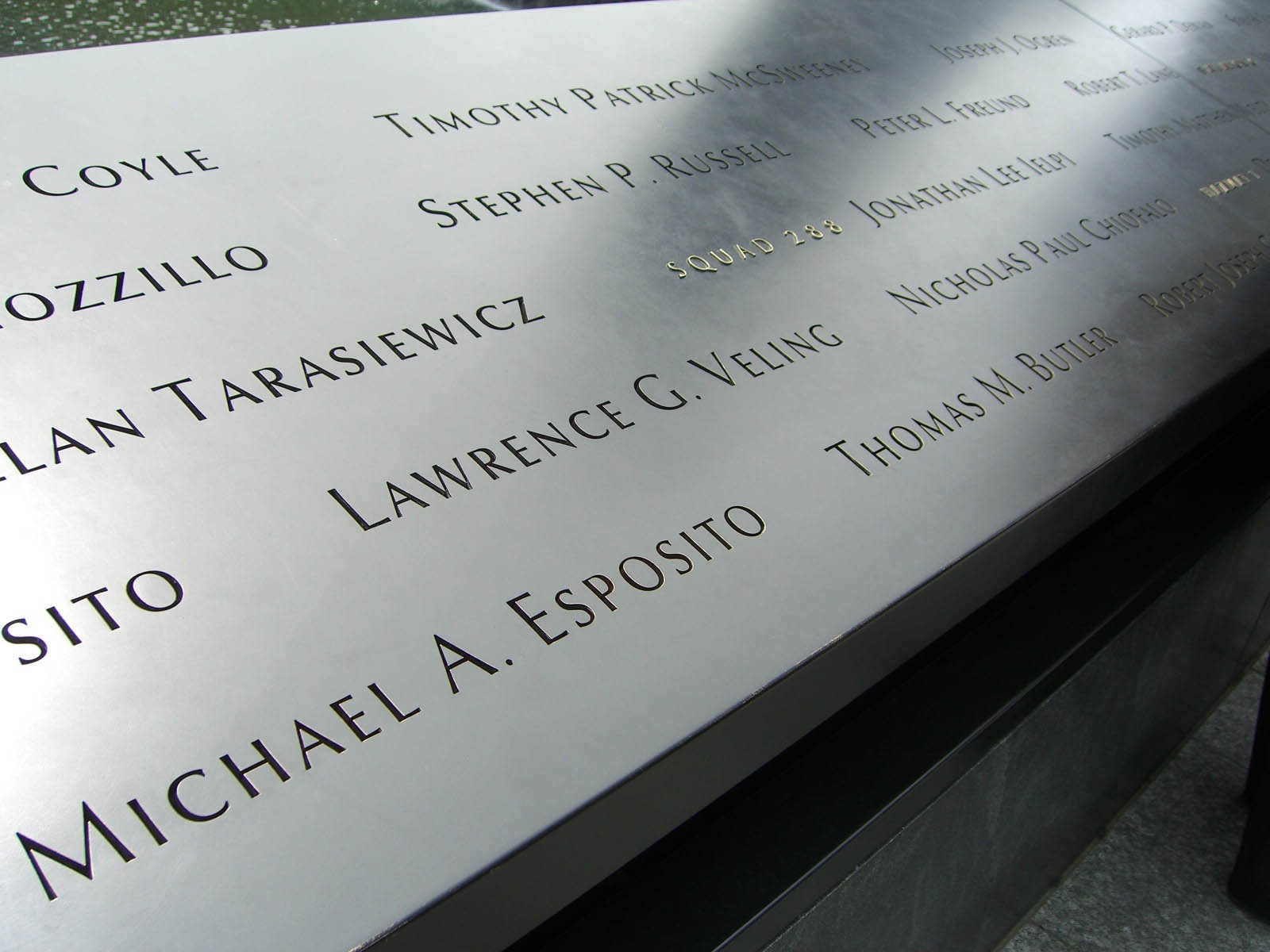
At the South Pool of the National September 11 Memorial, Panel S-7 is one of the three on which names of Squad Company 1 members can be seen. Visible in the photo are those of Michael A. Esposito and Thomas M. Butler along the bottom of the panel
