= Fire and Rescue Department of Malaysia =

Federal agency of Malaysia

- Jabatan Bomba dan Penyelamat Malaysia جابتن بومبا دان ڤڽلامت مليسيا (JBPM)
- Fire and Rescue Department of Malaysia Coat of Arms

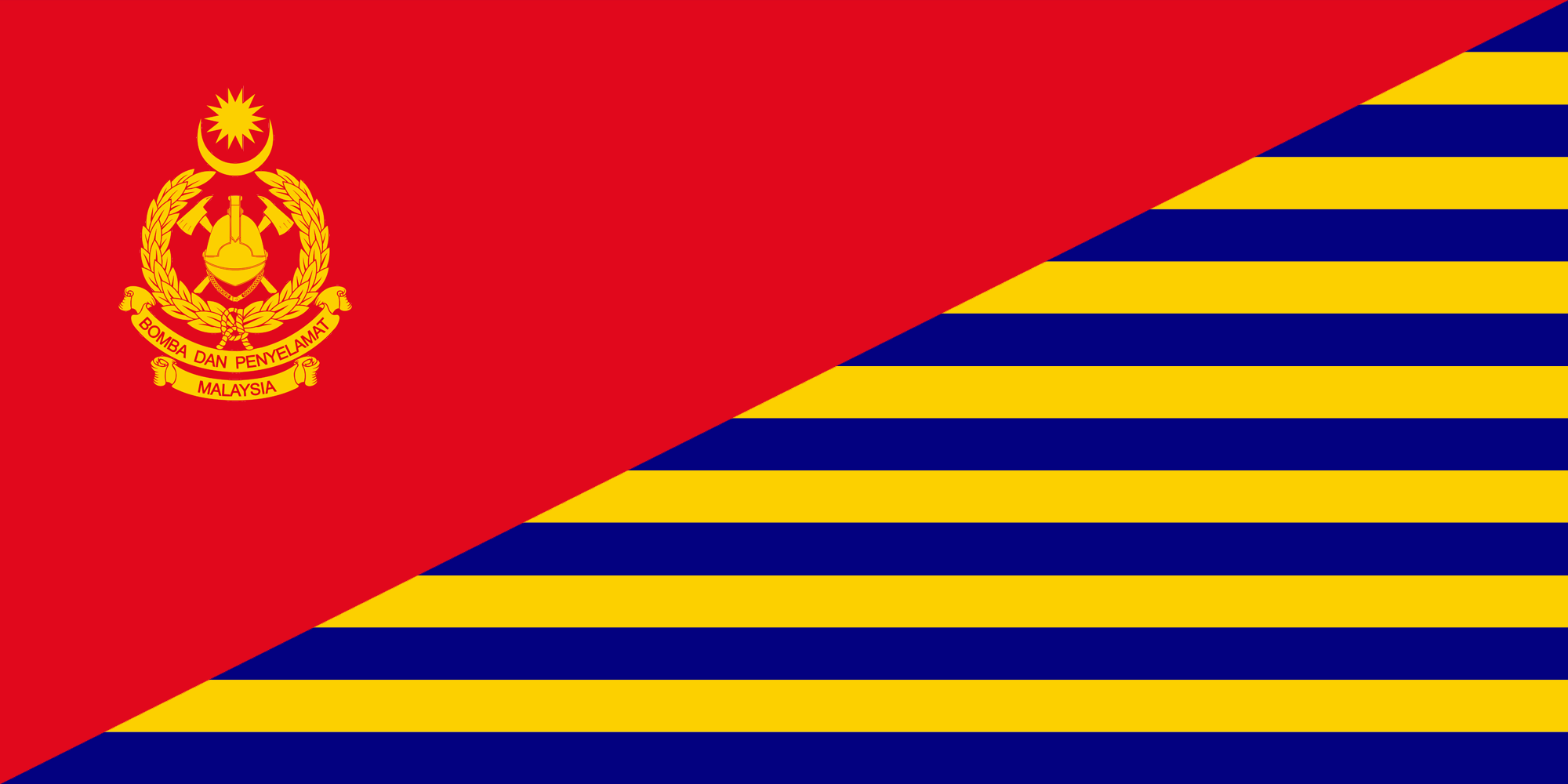
- Flag of the Malaysian Fire and Rescue Department

Department overview
- Formed: 1883; 143 years ago
- Jurisdiction: Government of Malaysia
- Headquarters: Fire and Rescue Department of Malaysia Headquarters, Putrajaya
- Motto: "Sedia Menyelamat", "Cepat Dan Mesra" (English: "Ready To Rescue","Fast And Friendly")
- Employees: 15,000 (2024)
- Minister responsible: Nga Kor Ming, Minister of Housing and Local Government
- Deputy Minister responsible: Aiman Athirah Sabu, Deputy Minister of Housing and Local Government
- Department executive: Nor Hisham Mohammad, Director General of Fire and Rescue Department of Malaysia
- Parent department: Ministry of Housing and Local Government
- Key document: Fire Services Act 1988
- Website: www.bomba.gov.my

The Fire and Rescue Department of Malaysia (Malay: Jabatan Bomba dan Penyelamat Malaysia (JBPM), Jawi: جابتن بومبا دان ڤڽلامت مليسيا), commonly known as Bomba, is a federal agency of Malaysia responsible for firefighting and technical rescue. Bomba is a Malay word derived from the Portuguese bombeiros which means 'firefighters'.

== History ==
Firefighting services in Malaysia began in 1883 with the establishment of the Selangor fire and rescue volunteers led by H.F. Bellamy, with 15 active personnel. The Malayan Union Fire Services (MUS), based in Kuala Lumpur, was established after World War II, headed by Flight Lt. W.J. German.

The firefighting services became the responsibility of state governments after the Malaysia Federation Agreement. The services were then integrated as a federal-level department on 1 January 1976, reporting to the Ministry of Housing and Local Government. The department received a new name on 15 May 1981: "The Malaysian Fire Services Department".

On 8 January 1997, the Malaysian Ministerial Cabinet agreed to change the coat of arms, flag, and name of the Malaysian Fire Services Department to the Malaysian Fire and Rescue Department. These were officially launched in a ceremony at the Genting Highlands Fire and Rescue Station in Pahang on 21 February 1997, by Prime Minister of Malaysia Mahathir Mohamad.In the 2010s and 2020s, the department expanded its fleet and specialized search and rescue operations through the establishment of dedicated units such as STORM and MOSAR. Legislative updates, including the Fire Services (Amendment) Act 2018, further streamlined the regulation and registration of volunteer firefighter teams directly under federal departmental governance.

== Organizational structure ==
=== Fire and Rescue Academy ===
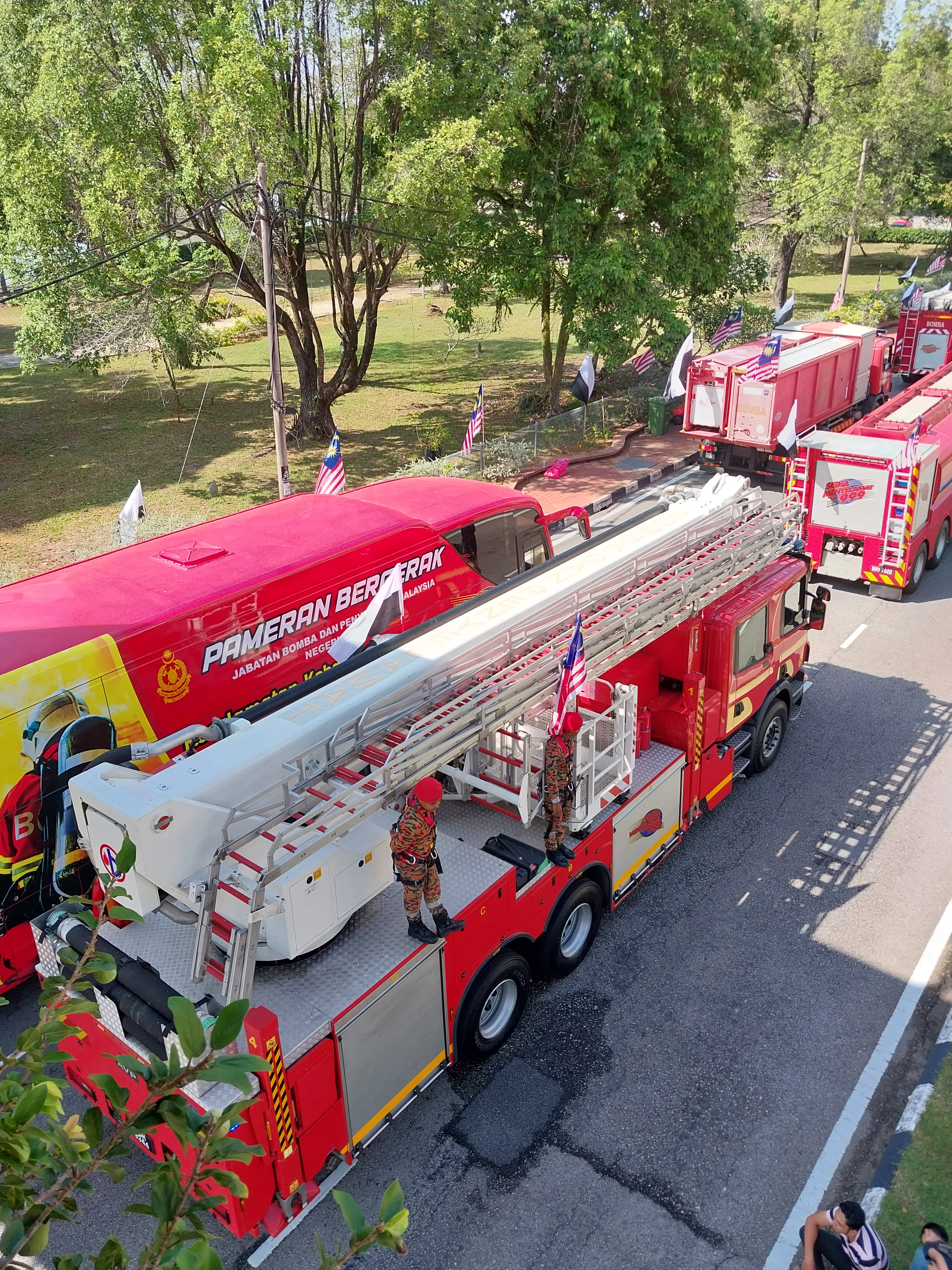
JBPM fleet in 2023 NDP in Kuantan.

There are five Fire and Rescue Academy of Malaysia (FRAM) (Malay: Akademi Bomba dan Penyelamat Malaysia) campuses which includes:

1. FRAM Central Region, Kuala Kubu Bharu, Selangor.
2. FRAM Eastern Region, Wakaf Tapai, Marang, Terengganu.
3. FRAM Northern Region, Tronoh, Perak.
4. FRAM Sabah Region, Kota Kinabalu, Sabah.
5. FRAM Sarawak Region, Kuching, Sarawak.

FRAM offers certificate and diploma level courses in fire and rescue.

FRAM has a Band Unit that is attached to FRAM Central Region. The re-establishment was officiated by the then Deputy Prime Minister, Tan Sri Muhyidin Yassin. Historically, the Auxiliary Fire Service was first formed in 1940. Then, after World War II, they were absorbed into the regular fire services.

There are some differences between Auxiliaries and Volunteers. Auxiliary Firefighters (Malay: Pegawai Bomba Bantuan; PBB) are formally trained at FRAM, while the Volunteer Firefighters receive their training at state and district fire stations. Auxiliary Firefighters are governed by the Fire Services Act 1988 and receive an allowance from the government. Volunteer Firefighters do not receive allowances from the government but are citizen volunteers serving as part of Volunteer Firefighting Teams based at Volunteer Fire Stations paid for by their local community. They are covered through insurance paid for by the Malaysian Government. Previously registered and governed by the Registrar of Societies, Volunteer Firefighters will now be registered and governed directly by the Malaysian Fire and Rescue Department after Parliament passed the Fire Services (Amendment) Act 2018.

==== Mountain Search and Rescue ====
After the Sabah earthquake that happened on 5 June 2015 affected Ranau and Mount Kinabalu, a specialist Mountain Search and Rescue team (MOSAR) was formed out of the Kinabalu Mountain Guides of Sabah Parks on 23 June 2015. In a ceremony at Ranau Fire Station, 20 Kinabalu Mountain Guides were appointed as Auxiliary Firefighters and designated as the founding members of MOSAR. The ceremony was officiated by the then Minister of Urban Wellbeing, Housing and Local Government, Datuk Abdul Rahman Dahlan.

MOSAR takes its place among Malaysian Fire and Rescue Department's specialist rescue units, which includes the Special Tactical Operation and Rescue Team of Malaysia (STORM) and the Multi Skill Team (MUST).

=== Air Wing ===
JBPM Air Wing (Malay: Unit Udara Bomba) provides aerial firefighting, casualty evacuation, search and rescue, and reconnaissance support. Operating from bases in Subang, Miri, and Kota Kinabalu, the unit operates utility helicopters including the AgustaWestland AW139, AgustaWestland AW189, and Mil Mi-17.

=== Volunteer Fire Force ===
Volunteer Fire Force (Malay: Pasukan Bomba Sukarela; PBS) traces their history back to 1883. The modern Volunteer Fire Force was formed in 1987 and protected under Section 62 (1) (CA) Fire and Rescue Services Act 1988. Each Volunteer Fire Force has their own fire stations, fire trucks, and equipment, which are usually sponsored by local industry.

The primary role of the Volunteer Fire Force is to perform firefighting operations in their community. In case of fire emergencies in their community, the volunteers are the first there to control if not extinguish the fire. Their secondary role is to be the link between JBPM and their local community. In addition, they are entrusted by JBPM to spread awareness regarding to fire safety.

The Volunteer Fire Force train regularly in district fire stations so that they and their equipment are in good shape for fire emergencies. The volunteers can be easily identified by their yellow Firefighting Operations Dress.

== Uniform ==
JBPM start using 'Very Dark Corn Flower Blue' for their official duty uniform since 1997.

== Rank ==
| # | Rank | Abbreviation | Rank (English) | Grade SSM (Former) | Grade SSPA (New) | Epaulet | |
| # | Rank | Abbreviation | Rank (English) | Grade SSM (Former) | Grade SSPA (New) | Shoulder Board | Collar Badge |
|---|---|---|---|---|---|---|---|
Penguasa Bomba (Fire Superintendent)
| 1 | Ketua Pesuruhjaya Bomba | KPjB | Chief Fire Commissioner | JUSA A (Penguasa Bomba VU5) | | | |
| 2 | Pesuruhjaya Bomba | PjB | Fire Commissioner | JUSA B (Penguasa Bomba VU6) | | | |
| 3 | Timbalan Pesuruhjaya Bomba | TPjB | Deputy Fire Commissioner | JUSA C (Penguasa Bomba VU7) | | | |
| 4 | Penolong Kanan Pesuruhjaya Bomba | PKPjB | Senior Assistant Fire Commissioner | KB54 | KB14 | | |
| 5 | Penolong Pesuruhjaya Bomba | PPjB | Assistant Fire Commissioner | KB52 | KB13 | | |
| 6 | Penguasa Kanan Bomba I | PgKB I | Senior Fire Superintendent I | KB48 | KB12 | | |
| 7 | Penguasa Kanan Bomba II | PgKB II | Senior Fire Superintendent II | KB44 | KB10 | | |
| 8 | Penguasa Bomba | PgB | Fire Superintendent | KB41 | KB9 | | |
| Penolong Penguasa Bomba (Assistant Fire Superintendent) | | | | | | | |
| 9 | Timbalan Penguasa Bomba I | TPgB I | Deputy Fire Superintendent I | KB40 | KB8 | | |
| 10 | Timbalan Penguasa Bomba II | TPgB II | Deputy Fire Superintendent II | KB38 | KB7 | | |
| 11 | Penolong Kanan Penguasa Bomba | PKPgB | Senior Assistant Fire Superintendent | KB32 | KB6 | | |
| 12 | Penolong Penguasa Bomba | PPgB | Assistant Fire Superintendent | KB29 | KB5 | | |
Pegawai Bomba (Fire Officer)
| 13 | Pegawai Bomba Tinggi I | PBT I | Leading Fire Officer I | KB28 | KB4 | | |
| 14 | Pegawai Bomba Tinggi II | PBT II | Leading Fire Officer II | KB26 (BASED ON INTERVIEW) | KB3 (BASED ON INTERVIEW) | | |
| 15 | Pegawai Bomba Tinggi II | PBT II (TBBK2) | Leading Fire Officer II | KB26 (PROMOTION BASED ON TIME-BASED/13 YEARS) • FROM KB22 (BASED ON INTERVIEW) | KB3 (PROMOTION BASED ON TIME-BASED/13 YEARS) • FROM KB2 (BASED ON INTERVIEW) | | |
| 16 | Pegawai Bomba Tinggi II | PBT II (TBBK2) | Leading Fire Officer II | KB26 (PROMOTION BASED ON TIME-BASED/13 YEARS) • FROM KB19 (HAKIKI) | KB3 (PROMOTION BASED ON TIME-BASED/13 YEARS) • FROM KB1 (HAKIKI) | | |
| 17 | Pegawai Bomba Kanan I | PBK I | Senior Fire Officer I | KB22 (BASED ON INTERVIEW) | KB2 (BASED ON INTERVIEW) | | |
| 18 | Pegawai Bomba Kanan II | PBK II (TBBK1) | Senior Fire Officer II | KB22 (PROMOTION BASED ON TIME-BASED/13 YEARS) • FROM KB19 (HAKIKI) | KB2 (PROMOTION BASED ON TIME-BASED/13 YEARS) • FROM KB1 (HAKIKI) | | |
| 19 | Pegawai Bomba | PB | Fire Officer | KB19 (3 YEARS OVER AND POSITION CONFIRMED) | KB1 (3 YEARS OVER AND POSITION CONFIRMED) | | |
| 20 | Pegawai Bomba | PB | Fire Officer | KB19 (NEW APPOINTMENT) | KB1 (NEW APPOINTMENT) | | |

Source :

1. List of Rank

2. Facebook

== Medal of honour & Service bar ==
| # | RIBBON BAR | NAME OF STAR/ Medal |
|---|---|---|
| 1. | | Fire Service Distinguished Service Star |
| 2. | | Fire Service Star |
| 3. | | Red Hero Star |
| 4. | | Firefighter Distinguished Service Medal |
| 5. | | Fire Service Medal |
| 6. | | Firefighter Loyalty Medal |
| 7. | | Firefighter Excellence Medal |
| 8. | | Fire Devotion Medal |

| # | SERVICE RIBBON | DESCRIPTION OF SERVICE |
|---|---|---|
| 1. | | Service in Yogyakarta ( 2006 ) |
| 2. | | Service in Leyte ( 2006 ) |
| 3. | | Service in Riau ( 2005 ) |
| 4. | | Service in Aceh ( 2004 ) |
| 5. | | Service in Indonesia ( 1997 ) |
| 6. | | 30 years Service Bar |
| 7. | | 20 years Service Bar |
| 8. | | 10 Years Service Bar |
| 9. | | Position Confirmed |

- Based on PTKP Number 6 of 2024 - Regulations on the use of Service Ribbons and JBPM Service Medal Ribbons effective April 25, 2025.

== Special operations ==
Pasukan Khas Jabatan Bomba dan Penyelamat Malaysia (English: JBPM Special Forces) is a term used by JBPM to its special trained firefighters.

To differentiate with regular firefighters, Special Force firefighters wear a unit patch on the right shoulder and use different styles of camouflage and operations uniform.

MUST Team, Smoke Jumpers (PASKUB), and STORM can be sent to overseas to help handling any disaster with STORM being the primary unit being sent.

=== Special Forces ===
==== STORM ====
Special Tactical Operation and Rescue Team of Malaysia (Malay: Pasukan Taktikal Khas Operasi dan Penyelamat Malaysia; STORM) is a specialized urban search and rescue (USAR) unit established in 2011. STORM is designed to handle complex structural collapses, natural disasters, and heavy-equipment rescues both domestically and internationally under the International Search and Rescue Advisory Group (INSARAG) framework.

Candidates undergo physical evaluation and specialized training in heavy structural shoring, concrete breaching, and technical rope rescue.

==== HAZMAT & CBRNE Team ====
Formed on 29 October 1992 based on the recommendation made by the Royal Commission of Enquiry on the Bright Sparklers Fireworks disaster. Initially, the team was known as Hazmat Team and in 2001 after the September 11 disaster the department decided to incorporate the CBRNe component to its name. This elite team are well trained to deal with both man made and toxic industrial disaster. They are part of training provider for Organisation for the Prohibition of Chemical Weapons (OPCW) and also the main rescue agency under the National Security Council Directive No.18 and 20in Malaysia. it was Hazardous Material Unit Team or commonly known as "HAZMAT" is a JBPM's Special Force trusted to handle with five types of hazards which is:

1. Handling hazardous chemical spills.
2. Decontaminate JBPM personnel that have been exposed to hazardous materials.
3. Handling radioactive and radiation-emitting materials.
4. Handling fire caused by hazardous materials.
5. Handling Chemical, Biological, Radiological, Nuclear Exposure (CBRNe) during wartime.

==== MUST Team ====
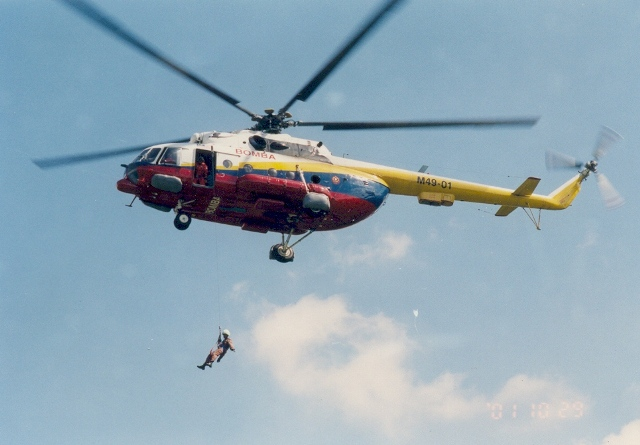
MUST exercise using Mil Mi-17 helicopter.

Multi-Skill Team (MUST) is an elite airborne team of JBPM. Formed on 11 September 1998, MUST is formed by combining all special trained firefighters into one team and supported by helicopters from JBPM Air Wing. MUST units are usually deployed whenever a certain special unit is unavailable in a certain area or when extra assistance is requested by other special units. MUST primarily serve as helicopter-borne firefighters mainly tasked with rescue involving airborne rappelling insertion.

Although MUST is primarily an elite airborne unit, MUST can conduct support operations to assist other divisions (that are unavailable or requested) such as:

- High Rise Rescue
- Water Rescue
- Major Road and Traffic Accident management
- HAZMAT Operations (Support unit)
- General Search and Rescue (basic) first responder
- Emergency Medical and Rescue (helicopter-borne extraction)
- Jungle Firefighting
- High Angle Rescue
- Air Rescue (rappel insertion)

All MUST members are trained in helicopter-borne, emergency management in aircraft, jungle survival and sea-land navigation.

Elite JBPM Rescue Swimmer Unit is attached to MUST.

==== RIM ====
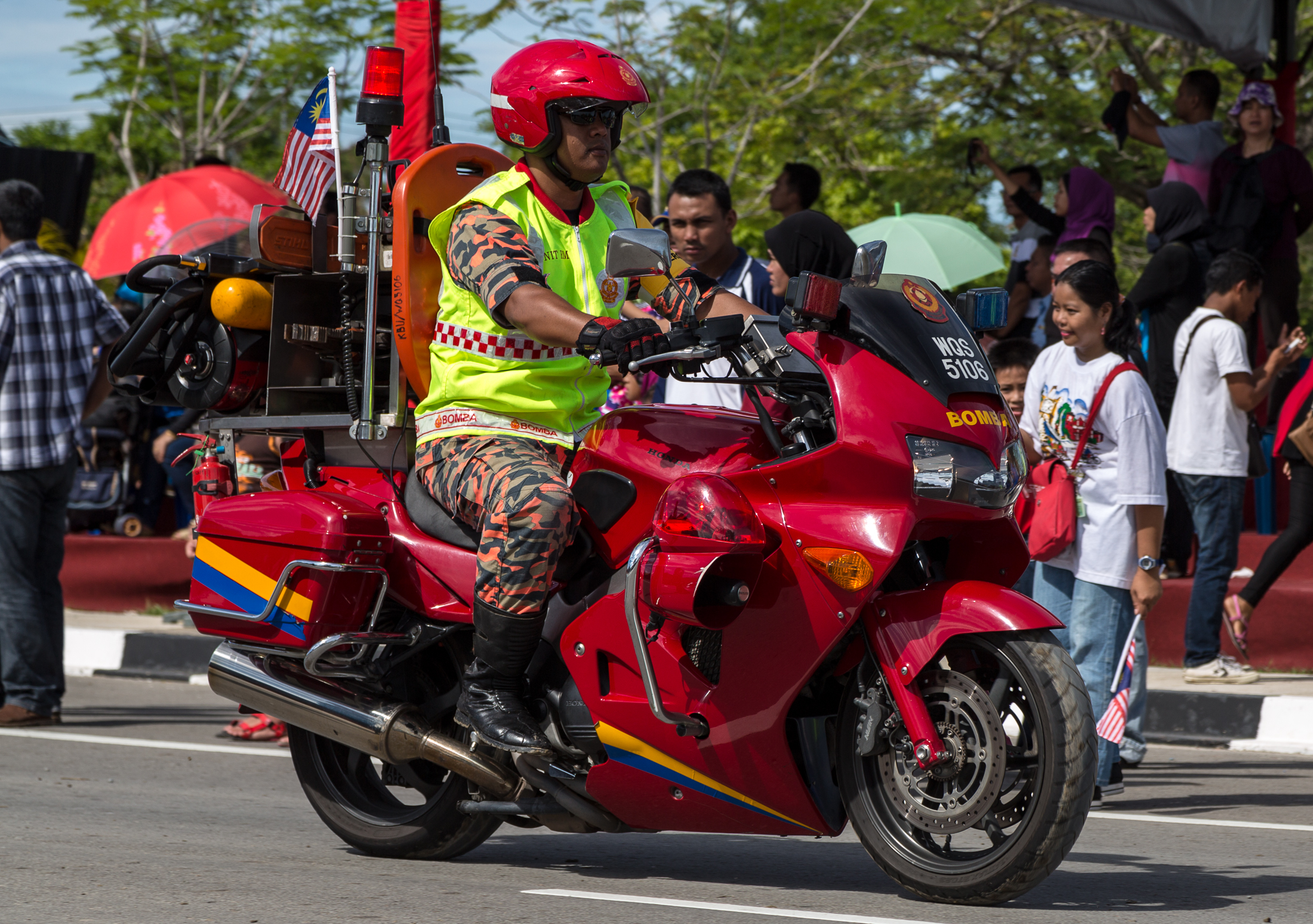
JBPM RIM's Honda ST 10000 during parade.

Rapid Intervention Motorcycle Team (RIM) was formed in 1999 to tackle problems of late arriving rescue caused by traffic jammed in the big city. With superbikes equipped with basic Firefighting and rescue equipment, RIM team can handle small scale fire and Road and Traffic Accident (RTA) without having traffic problems. During bigger scale of fire, RIM team will arrive early and assess the size and type of incident, building, and materials involve and victim if any. RIM team also will help control the traffic for the fire truck movement.

==== Water Rescue Unit ====
Pasukan Penyelamat Dalam Air (PPDA); also known as Water Rescue Unit, their role is to deal with incidents and emergencies that occur in the water. This unit consists of qualified officers and men trained at local and overseas diving training centres. All members of the JBPM Water Rescue Unit are certified divers from the National Association of Underwater Instructors (NAUI).

==== PASKUB ====
Pasukan Khas Udara Bomba (PASKUB) (English: Bomba Special Air Services) is a command for elite Smokejumper with support of helicopters from JBPM Air Wing.

Smoke Jumpers Unit (Malay: Unit Payung Terjun Bomba) is an elite unit of JBPM and trained in parachute insertion (static line and freefall), helicopter-borne operation and jungle survival. The formation of elite Smoke Jumper began in 2000 after JBPM sent five firefighters to enter the Basic Static Line Parachuting Course held at Royal Malaysian Air Force (RMAF) Sempang Air Force Base, Sungai Besi as the pioneer team Smoke Jumpers. The course was conducted by RMAF Special Operations Force, PASKAU until 2007 when JBPM established their own Static Ramp Air Course. Among the task of Smoke Jumper is:

- Combat Air Rescue Medic
- Medical Evacuation (Medevac)
- Deep jungle/Isolated Area Firefighting Operations

Smoke Jumper maintains good relations with Malaysian Armed Force Special Operations Forces as they always train with RMAF PASKAU, Malaysian Army Grup Gerak Khas from PULPAK and Royal Malaysian Police VAT 69 Commando. PASKUB members are selected from various units including STORM, MUST and EMRS.

==== EMRS ====
Emergency Medical Rescue Services (EMRS) Team was formed in 2006 with cooperation from the Malaysian Ministry of Health and Malaysian Association of Traumatology and Emergency Medicine (MASTEM). EMRS was established as a Special Force Paramedic to rescue and conduct medical care to other JBPM Special Forces members if any incident occurs to them. However, EMRS can rescue and conduct medical care to civilians if there are no other ambulance or paramedics from the Malaysian Ministry of Health or State Health Department around.

Typically, EMRS team is assigned to HAZMAT and Water Rescue unit and EMRS vehicle will go out in pairs with the other JBPM Special Forces vehicle to operations. EMRS members are also usually tasked as paramedics during JBPM Special Forces and Special Operations Forces Selections.

Some EMRS members are trained in HAZMAT and Scuba diving.

==== K9 Unit ====
Detection Unit (K9), commonly known as K9 Unit, uses trained dogs to operate in the Search and Rescue (SAR) operations and investigation. The K9 Unit can be attached to the regular firefighting unit or JBPM Special Forces. The K9 Unit are typically deployed for fire investigation, urban search, bodies recovery, and wilderness search. JBPM's K9 Unit was first set up in Kuala Lumpur in 2002, which serves the entire Peninsular Malaysia. In 2018, the K9 Unit was expanded to both the state of Sabah and Sarawak, thereby extending the unit's coverage to East Malaysia.

As of August 2025, JBPM only has 20 K9 dogs, with 13 dogs housed in its Jalan Klang Lama headquarters, and the other 7 stationed in Sabah and Sarawak. Among the 20 dogs, 15 are operational ready, while the remaining 5 are on "cage rest" due to age or illness. In April 2025, the department announced 16 new K9 dogs will be added to the unit, with nine dogs for Peninsular Malaysia, five for Sabah, and two for Sarawak. They were expected to arrived in Malaysia in October 2025 and operational by November. 15 out of the 16 K9 dogs arrived in Malaysia in October 2025, with the remaining one dog disqualified due to underwhelming performance. Its replacement is slated to arrived by the end of October and all 16 dogs will be deployed for official duties in December 2025.

In August 2025, it was revealed that the department is planning to set up new K9 centres in Penang and on the East Coast to cut down deployment time. On 17 November 2025, it's confirmed that the new K9 centre in Penang will be built on a 5 acres (2.02 hectares) site at the Bertam Fire Station and JBPM Northern Region Air Base, which allow fast deployment to East Coast areas as well through JBPM's air unit. The Ministry of Finance has approved RM19 million for the construction of the new K9 centre, and the centre is expected to be operational by early 2029.

Dog breeds employed by the unit include Labrador Retrievers and English Springer Spaniels, which are sourced from the United Kingdom. However there are plans to breed K9 dogs locally, which will be the first for the department. K9 dogs under the JBPM typically serve until they are 8 years old, but may be extended to 10 years old if the dogs are in good health. Retired dogs will continue to remain under the care of their handlers in the department until their death. The department do not euthanise retired dogs unless they are severely ill, and would only do so under a veterinarian's advice.

In 2023, K9 Unit under JBPM has been deployed for 308 cases. In 2024, the unit also handled 345 cases, a 12% increase from the previous year. Since 2022, JBPM's K9 Unit has experienced a surge in popularity among the Malaysian public, particularly after the 2022 Batang Kali landslide, and the National Day parade in 2023.

==== Special Force Boat Team ====
A support team task to support JBPM Special Forces with water transportation during operations involving of lake, river and sea. The boat crews are trained in water survival and able to perform water rescue to JBPM personnel and civilians if necessary.

=== Special Operations Force ===
==== STORM ====
Special Tactical Operation and Rescue Team of Malaysia (STORM) unit is a part of the Malaysian Rapid Deployment Force (Malay: Pasukan Aturgerak Cepat; PAC) together with 10 Parachute Brigade (10 PARA) but with different task and role. Formed in March 2011, STORM winning is a Search and Rescue (SAR) experts and on standby for 24/7 at JBPM Airbases and State Branch Headquarters. Storm unit mainly task with SAR operations involving:

- Night rescue operations
- Heavy Urban Search and Rescue (Advanced) and Technical Rescue
- Deep-jungle rescue
- Cave rescue
- Air-sea rescue
- Mountain rescue
- Large-scale natural disaster
- Airplane and Helicopter crash

Dubbed as Komando Bomba (English: Bomba Commando), to be selected as STORM members, firefighters need to pass the rigorous selection course which is on par as Basic Commando Course. Eligibility requirements including Individual Physical Proficiency Test (IPPT) standards of physical fitness that is also used by the Singapore Armed Forces (SAF), Singapore Police Force (SPF) and Singapore Civil Defence Force (SCDF) before trainee can even enter the Basic Storm Course. Once pass the Storm Survival Course, the graduate will receive a tactical knife, the same sort used by RMAF PASKAU, STORM patch and permission to wear STORM Red Helmet and STORM Version Camouflage Dress.

Many of STORM members are drawn from Water Rescue Unit (PPDA), EMRS, HAZMAT Unit and MUST.

For big operations, STORM work together with other federal SAR Special Force; Special Malaysia Disaster Assistance and Rescue Team (SMART) which under administration of the National Security Council. They are usually supported by the jungle experts, the aboriginal police unit; Senoi Praaq, Royal Malaysian Police's (RMP) VAT 69 Commando and General Operations Force, Malaysian Armed Force special operations force and Malaysian Civil Defence Force.

== Current inventory ==
=== Vehicles ===
| Vehicle | Image | Type | Quantity | Notes |
|---|---|---|---|---|
| MAN TGM 18.280 4x2 BL Doka | | Fire rescue tender | 2 | |
| CNHTC Sitrak C5H 330 | | Fire rescue tender | 30 | |
| Hino Dutro 300 Series | | Urban search and rescue tender | 5 | |
| Hino Dutro 300 Series | | Compact fire rescue tender | 150 | |
| Scania P360 Trailer Truck | | 20,000-litre water tanker | 547 | |
| Scania P410 | | 32-metre aerial ladder platform (ALP) | | |
| Bedford TK | | Simon snorkel hydraulic platform | | Disposed |
| Scania P4D | | Fire rescue tender | 4 | |
| Scania 94D | | Fire rescue tender | 87 | |
| Scania P310 | | Fire rescue tender | 307 | |
| Scania P310 Multilift Truck | | Hose carrier | | |
| Scania 93m | | HAZMAT tender | | |
| MAN 18.350 HOCL A91 | | HAZMAT tender | | |
| Volvo FMX 480 | | Foam tender | | |
| Isuzu 810 CXZ | | 40-metre Morita Super Gyro turn table ladder | 5 | |
| Nissan Diesel UD; Condor CPB14 | | Fire rescue tender | | Disposed/Donated to Volunteer Fire Force |
| Land Rover 109/110 | | Utility | 25 | |
| Mitsubishi Pajero | | Firefighting and rescue | 189 | |
| Isuzu Trooper v6 | | Utility | 79 | |
| Mercedes-Benz Atego 1125 | | Light fire rescue tender | 198 | |
| Mercedes-Benz Actros 1831 | | 30-metre Amdac-Magirus turn table ladder | | |
| Mercedes-Benz Actros 2635 | | 52-metre Amdac-Magirus turn table ladder | | |
| Mercedes-Benz Actros 2631 | | 10,000-litre heavy pump/water tender | | |
| Toyota Land Cruiser | | Utility | | |
| Toyota Hiace | | Emergency medical rescue service (EMRS) | | |
| Perodua Rusa | | Utility van | | |
| Perodua Kembara | | Firefighting and rescue | | |
| Toyota Hilux | | Firefighting and rescue | | |
| Isuzu D-Max | | Rapid rescue vehicle | | |
| Mitsubishi Pajero 4-WD; Fire Command Vehicle | | Firefighting command | | |
| DRB-HICOM Handalan; Truck Mk 2 | | 4WD general purpose 3-tonne truck with rear lift | | |
| Nissan Urvan Utility Van/MPV | | Utility | | |
| Kia Pregio | | Fire investigation/forensics vehicle | | |
| Weststar LDV Maxus | | Fire investigation/forensics vehicle | | |
| Kawasaki Versys 650 | | Rapid intervention motorcycle (RIM) | | |

=== Air units ===
| Aircraft | Image | Type | Quantity | Notes |
|---|---|---|---|---|
| AgustaWestland AW109 | | Light utility helicopter | 2 | Search and rescue, aerial surveillance, aerial command and control. (9M-BOA & 9M-BOB) (9M-BOA crashed on 16/9/2010 at near Lanchang Pahang) |
| AgustaWestland AW139 | | Medium utility helicopter | 5 | Firefighting, disaster relief, search and rescue, aerial surveillance, aerial command and control. The third helicopter delivered in 2026. (9M-BOC, 9M-BOD & TBC). The fourth and fifth helicopter delivered in 2026 under leased program. |
| AgustaWestland AW189 | | Medium utility helicopter | 1 | Delivered in December 2018. 9M-BOF crashed during a post-maintenance flight on 22/07/2023. |
| Mil Mi-17-1V | | Heavy utility helicopter | 4 | Search and rescue, heavy lift for utility, disaster relief, forest aerial firefighting. (M994-01 (Enggang), M994-02 (Pekaka), M994-03, M994-04) |

== In popular culture ==
- 2010: "Da Bomba", a comedy TV series by TV3, about Firefighters, their spouses and the fire station's living quarters Community.
- 2016: "Abang Bomba I Love You", a romantic TV series by ASTRO, about a young girl fallen in love with her rescuer; a firefighter.
- 2016 & 2020: "Hero", a TV series by RTM, about challenges faced by firefighters. Starring by Sharnaaz Ahmad, Tiz Zaqyah, Faezrul Khan, Rusdi Ramli Season 1) and Season 2 continue by Redza Rosli, Sarah Hildebrand, Aidil Aziz, Riz Amin, Anne Ngasri
- 2025: "Legasi: Bomba The Movie", an action film directed by James Lee. Starring by Ben Amir, Nas-T and Henley Hii.

== See also ==
- List of fire departments
- Elite Forces of Malaysia
