= Sarah Hildebrand =

Malaysian model and television personality

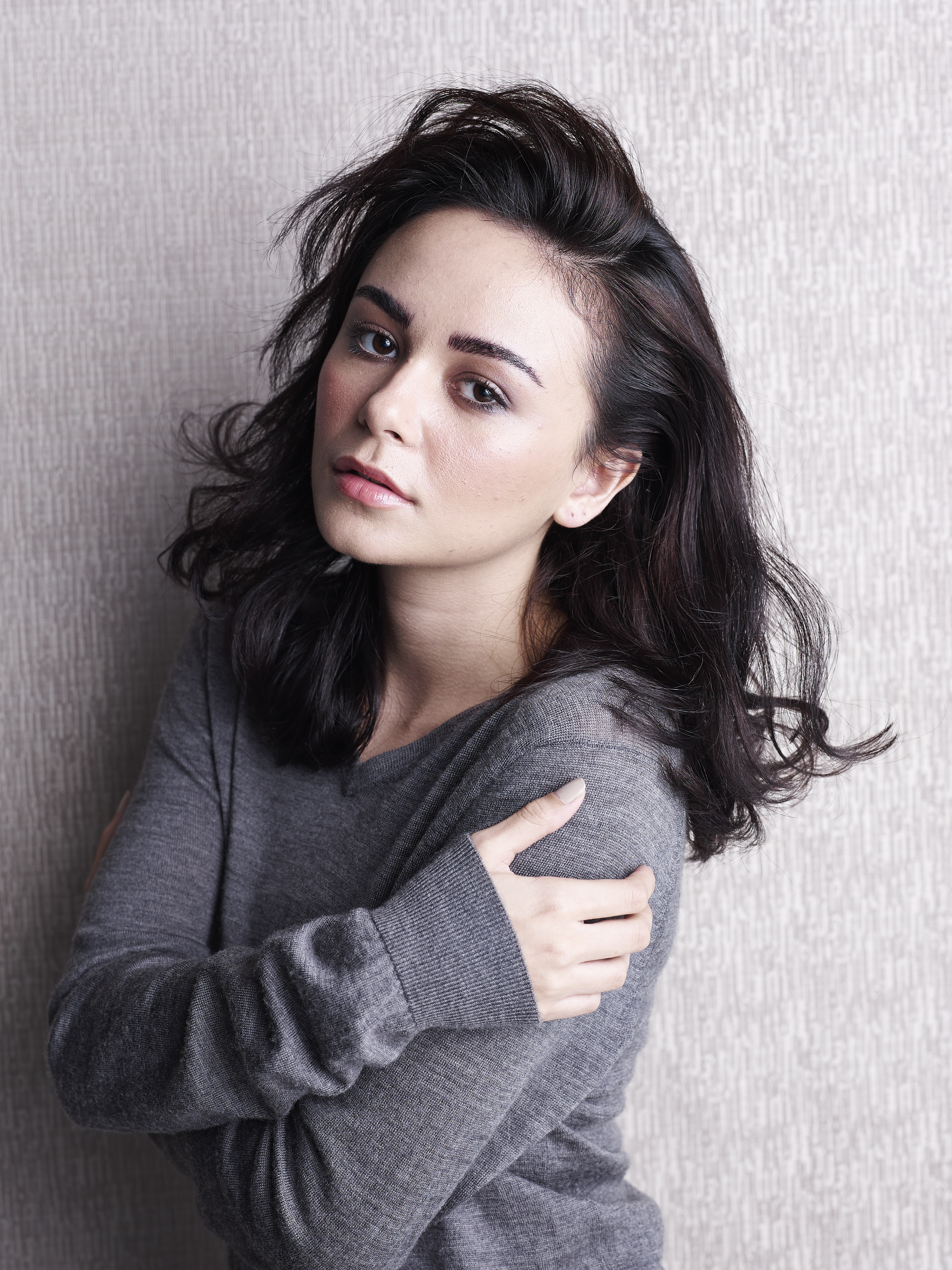
- Hildebrand in 2012
- Born: 18 August 1990 (age 35); Kuala Lumpur, Malaysia
- Occupations: Model, actress, television presenter
- Years active: 2013–present
- Website: Sarah Hildebrand on Instagram

Nur Sarah Marie Hildebrand (born 18 August 1990) is a Malaysian model, actress, and television host. She began her acting career in 2015, with several minor television and film roles. Hildebrand has appeared in magazines such as InTrend, EH! and Hijabista. Her name was catapulted into the spotlight after successfully playing the role of Nadine in the drama serial Pujaan Hati Kanda in 2018.

== Early life ==
Hildebrand was born in Kuala Lumpur, Malaysia, and is of Malay, American and German descent. Her mother raised her as a single parent.

== Career ==
Hildebrand was the winner of Gadis M2 reality TV show in 2013. She has made appearances in commercials and music videos, and made her acting debut in the television film Hujan Pagi.

Her acting debut was Mirip which was released in 2015, co-starring Fezrul Khan, Ezzaty Abdullah and Reen Rahim.

She appeared with Kilafairy, Erwin Dawson, Cristina Suzanne and Hefny Sahad in the mystery drama series, Nafas on ntv7, playing the role of Shila.

Hildebrand's name became popular and rose through the drama adaptation of the popular novel Pujaan Hati Kanda alongside Remy Ishak and Mira Filzah, where she played the role of the main antagonist named Nadine, where the character was her first antagonist appearance. The performance in the drama was praised by the media, in fact, the character Nadine played also attracted the audience's hatred for the character's sarcastic nature. The drama got a rating with a total audience of 12 million viewers.

== Personal life ==
She married Otto Gillen, an American citizen, on 3 November 2019.

She previously wore the hijab in September 2015, but announced that she would no longer wear the hijab in October 2020.

In April 2022, Hildebrand announces her retirement from the entertainment industry after almost a decade. In late July the same year, Hilderband joined United States Air Force.

== Filmography ==
=== Film ===
Year	Title	Role	Director	Notes
2015	Mirip		Jokin	First film
2015	Muluk Dan Konco: Hero Malaya		Prof. Madya Dato' Dr. A. Razak Mohaideen	

=== Telemovie film ===
Year	Title	Role	TV Network	Notes
2015	Hujan Pagi	Ati	Astro Prima & Astro Maya	Main role
2015	Jalan Singkat Ke Syurga	Rose	Astro Oasis	Main role
2015	Dia Imamku	Munirah	TV3	Main role
2017	Wanita Terindah	Reena	Astro First	Main role

=== TV series ===
Year	Title	Role	Network	Notes
2016	Suami Tanpa Cinta	Adura	Astro Ria	Supporting role
2018	Nafas	Shila	ntv7	Supporting role
2018	Pujaan Hati Kanda	Nadine	TV3	Supporting role
2020	Seindah Tujuh Warna Pelangi	Deniz Nadine	TV3	Supporting role
2020	Hero (Season 2)	PBM Arissa Shukri	TV2	Supporting role
2022	Tunggu Dulu Cinta	Nur Aivy Sofea	TV1	Main role

=== Music video appearances ===
Year	Song title	Singer	Notes
2014	Hujung Waktu	Azhael	
2015	Rindu	Shae	
2022	Abadi	Hazama	

=== TV commercial ===
Year	Brand	Description
2014	Perfecto Snacks	Perfecto Crisps
2015	Nouvelles Visages	Beauty Cosmetic
2015	Safi Balqis Oxywhite	Skincare

=== Host ===
Year	Title	Network
2016	HyppTV Highlights	HyppTV
2017	#OhEmGee	HyppTV

== Awards ==
Year	Award	Category	Notes	Result
2012	Female Cover Model Search	Magazine pageant	Model	Finalist
2013	Gadis M2	TV reality show	Model	Won
