= Special operations firefighter =

Firefighter trained for special tasks

A Special operations firefighter, also known as Fire Service Special Operations, is a specialist firefighter who has been specially trained to execute tasks other than standard firefighting operations. The National Fire Protection Association's Standard for the Organization and Deployment of Fire Suppression Operations, Emergency Medical Operations, and Special Operations to the Public by Career Fire Departments (NFPA 1710) defines special operations as "Those emergency incidents to which the fire department responds that require specific and advanced training and specialized tools and equipment". The NFPA 1710 further defined special operations as "Special operations include water rescue, extrication, hazardous materials, confined space entry, highangle rescue, aircraft rescue and fire fighting, and other operations requiring specialized training".

They are highly trained firefighters that do technical rescue operations. Special operations firefighters are intended to complement regular fire engine crews.

== Types ==
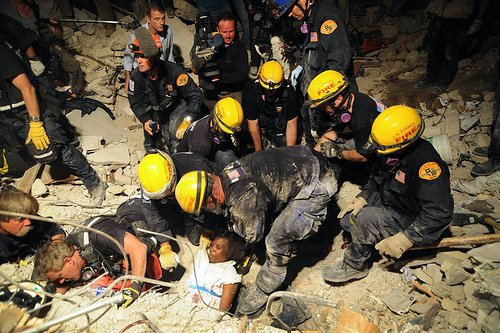
USAR firefighters (Note: This position is known as "USAR technician" in the United States.) from the Los Angeles County Fire Department retrieve buried victims during the 2010 Haiti earthquake.

Each fire service department has its own types of special operations firefighters. In the United States, for example, the types vary from one fire department to another. The types of special operations vary according to a city's size or geographic location. Basically, types of special operations firefighters are as following:

- Hazardous Materials (HAZMAT) Squad
- Urban Search and Rescue (USAR) Squad
- Air Operations Unit
- Dive Rescue Squad
- Underwater Search and Recovery Squad (also known as Dive Team)
- Marine Unit
- Bomb Squad
- Technical Rescue Squad
- High-angle Rescue Squad
- Extrication Squad
- Ice Rescue Squad
- Aircraft Rescue and Firefighting Squad
- Search and rescue Unit

== History ==
=== 1915-1930s ===
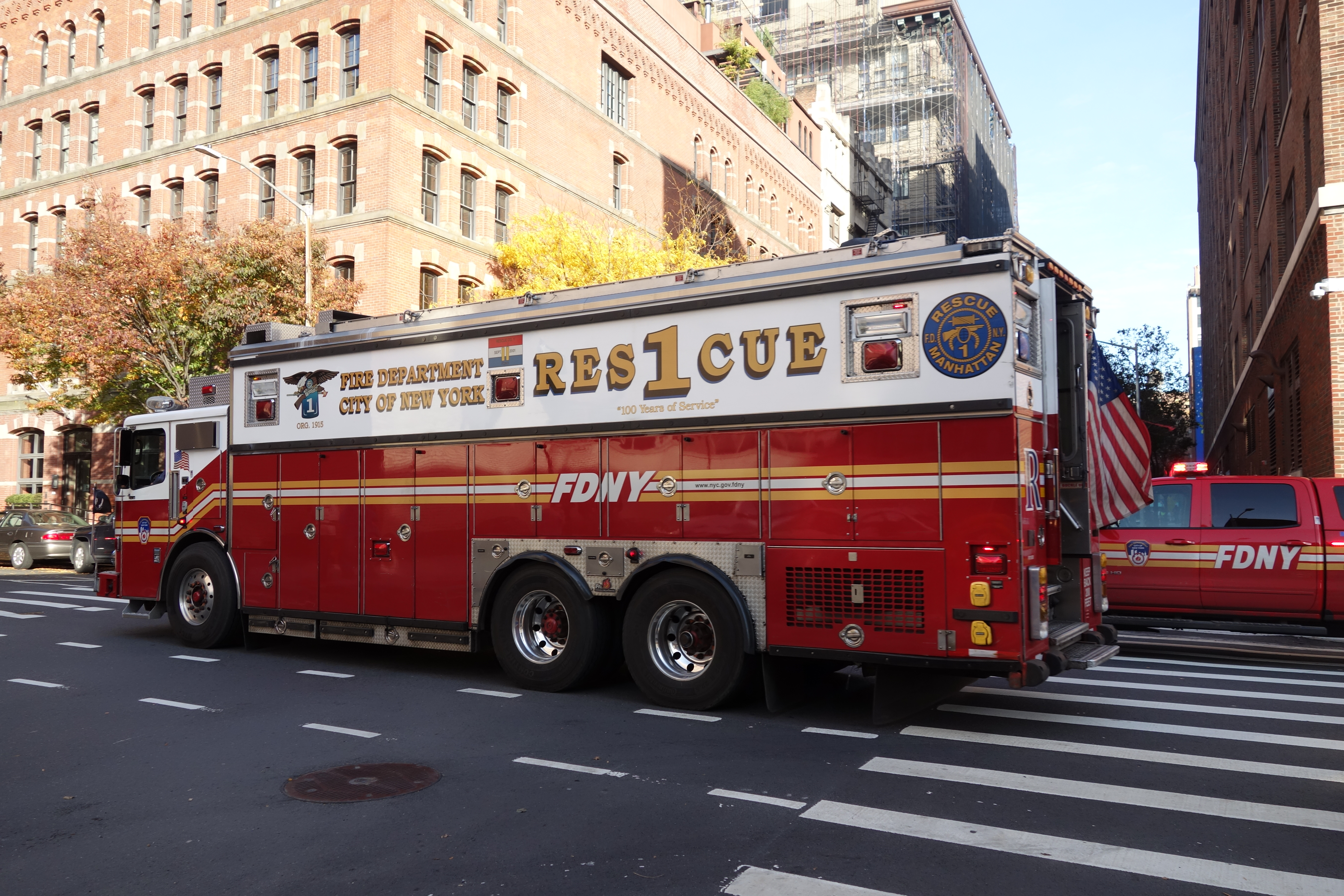
The FDNY Rescue Company No. 1's rescue vehicle

The New York City Fire Department's (FDNY) Rescue Company No. 1 is the oldest special operations firefighters in modern firefighting history. On 8 March 1915, Rescue Company No. 1 was established. Rescue Company No. 1 began as a volunteer fire squad composed of volunteers from the ironworker, elevator man, and mason professions. During that time, their work description included "performing civilian and firefighter rescues at structural fires as well as operating at "odd jobs"". The Rescue Company No. 1 transformed into a squad that handles rope rescues as well as underwater search and recovery. Today, the FDNY Rescue Companies are now responsible for missions such as rope rescue, urban search and rescue, trench rescue, fire and explosion rescue, and elevator rescue.

=== 1930s-1990 ===
The construction of high-rise structures was growing in the 1930s. This circumstance led to the establishment of new rescue squads or companies, not just by the FDNY but also by other fire departments, such as those in Boston. Later, more units with various specialisations were established. The New London School explosion occurred on 18 March 1937, in New London, Texas. The explosion was caused by natural gas, marking the beginning of HAZMAT operations.

=== 1990-present ===
The term "Fire Service Special Operations" was coined in 1990, when the FDNY unified all of its rescue companies, squad companies, marine units, TAC units (now known as FDNY Special Response Units), and HAZMAT units under one command. The command is known as the "Special Operations Command". Later, other fire departments began to refer to their special operations units as "special operations" units.

== Roles ==
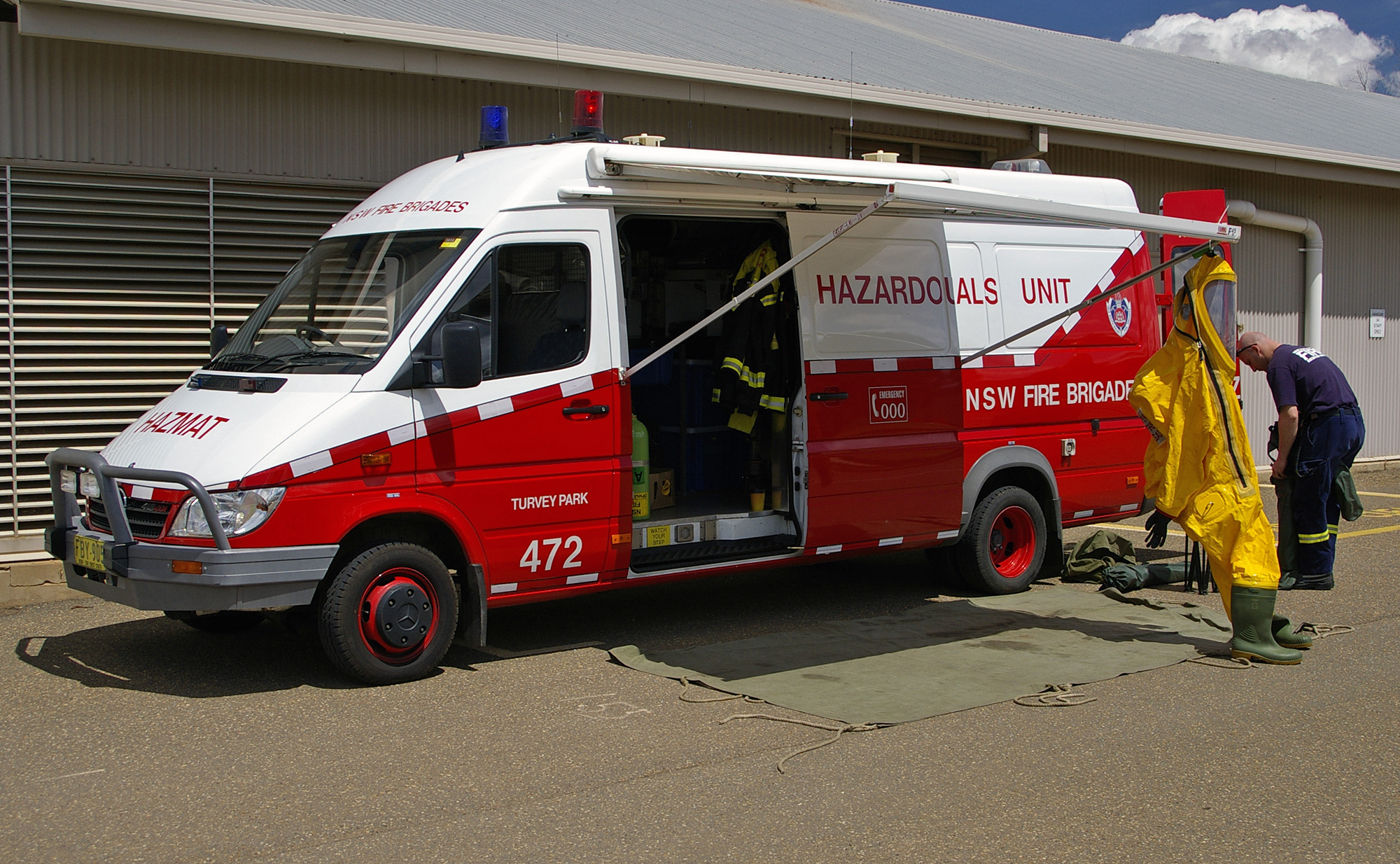
A New South Wales Fire Brigade's HAZMAT technician assembles his equipment for a HAZMAT drill.

According to the NFPA, special operations are a major service component of a fire department. Aside from special operations, other services include fire suppression, EMS, aircraft rescue and fire fighting, marine rescue and fire fighting, and/or wildland firefighting. Special operations are intended to complement conventional firefighting crews by providing specialised expertise and equipment throughout an operation. Depending on the squads and the fire department, the special operations firefighters may or may not be involved in firefighting operations.

The roles of special operations firefighters are self-explanatory based on the name of the squad. The HAZMAT squad, for example, is responsible for managing hazardous materials as well as fighting fires caused by hazardous materials. High-angle rescue squads are responsible for rescuing people from high places such as high-rise buildings and cable cars, and they are trained in rope rescue techniques. However, some fire departments combine multiple specialties into a single team. For instance, the FDNY's Squad Companies. They are special operations firefighters who respond to fires but are also called in for high angle, collapse, confined space, subway, and hazardous material emergencies. Another example is the McKinney Fire Department's TIFMAS squad. They are special operations firefighters that serve as wildland firefighters and as a disaster response squad.
