= Nor Hisham Mohammad =

Malaysian fire officer (born 1972)

Yang Amat Setia Dato' Sri Ts. Nor Hisham Mohammad SSAP DIMP KMN PPC PBK PPS PPA
- نور هشام محمد

9th Director-General of the Fire and Rescue Department of Malaysia
- Incumbent
- Assumed office 10 January 2024
- Monarchs: Abdullah (2024); Ibrahim (2024–present)
- Prime Minister: Anwar Ibrahim
- Minister: Nga Kor Ming
- Preceded by: Mohammad Hamdan Wahid

Personal details
- Born: Nor Hisham bin Mohammad; 12 October 1972 (age 53) Panchor, Perak, Federation of Malaya (now Malaysia)
- Education: University of Malaya (BA); University of Lancashire (HND); MARA Technological University (MBA)
- Occupation: Fire officer

Dato' Sri Ts. Nor Hisham bin Mohammad (Jawi: نور هشام بن محمد; born 12 October 1972) is a Malaysian fire officer who has served as the Director-General of the Fire and Rescue Department of Malaysia (JBPM) since 10 January 2024.

== Early life and education ==
Nor Hisham bin Mohammad was born at Panchor, Perak, Federation of Malaya (now Malaysia) on 12 October 1972. Nor Hisham received his early education at Pahang, Malaysia. After that, he continued his studies at the University of Malaya (UM) for the Bachelor of Arts (BA) in Environmental Studies in 1996. He received his Higher National Diploma in Fire Management and Operations of the Business and Technology Education Council (BTEC) from the University of Central Lancashire in 2002. Nor Hisham also had the Master of Business Administration (MBA) from the MARA Technological University (UiTM) in 2016.

== Firefighting career ==
Nor Hisham's career in the civil service at the Fire and Rescue Department of Malaysia (JBPM) began on 16 May 1997 as a Grade KB41 Fire Chief at the Fire Safety Division of the Fire and Rescue Department of Malaysia Headquarters (HQ), Federal Territory of Putrajaya.

Nor Hisham has held several important positions in JBPM such as Deputy Head of JBPM (Development), Director of the Fire and Rescue Operations Division (2020–2023), Director of Pahang JBPM (2018–2020), Director of Sarawak JBPM (2011–2018) and Commandant of the Malaysian Fire and Rescue Academy Central Region (2009–2011).

Nor Hisham also led several large-scale fire and rescue operations, including as Senior Commander of the search and rescue operation for the helicopter crash in Sebuyau, Sarawak on 5 May 2016 and Director of Operations of the National Emergency Management Committee (NEMC) for the floods in Selangor, Kuala Lumpur and Negeri Sembilan on 17 December 2021.

== Honours ==
=== Honours of Malaysia ===
- Malaysia
  - Officer of the Order of the Defender of the Realm (KMN) (2020)
  - Recipient of the Loyal Service Medal (PPS)
  - Recipient of the General Service Medal (PPA)
- Pahang
  - Grand Knight of the Order of Sultan Ahmad Shah of Pahang (SSAP) – Dato' Sri (2025)
  - Knight Companion of the Order of the Crown of Pahang (DIMP) – Dato' (2020)
- Sarawak
  - Recipient of the Distinguished Service Medal (PPC) (2015)
  - Officer of the Order of the Star of Hornbill Sarawak (PBK) (2013)
