= Surface water rescue =

Rescue of a person who is at the surface of a body of water

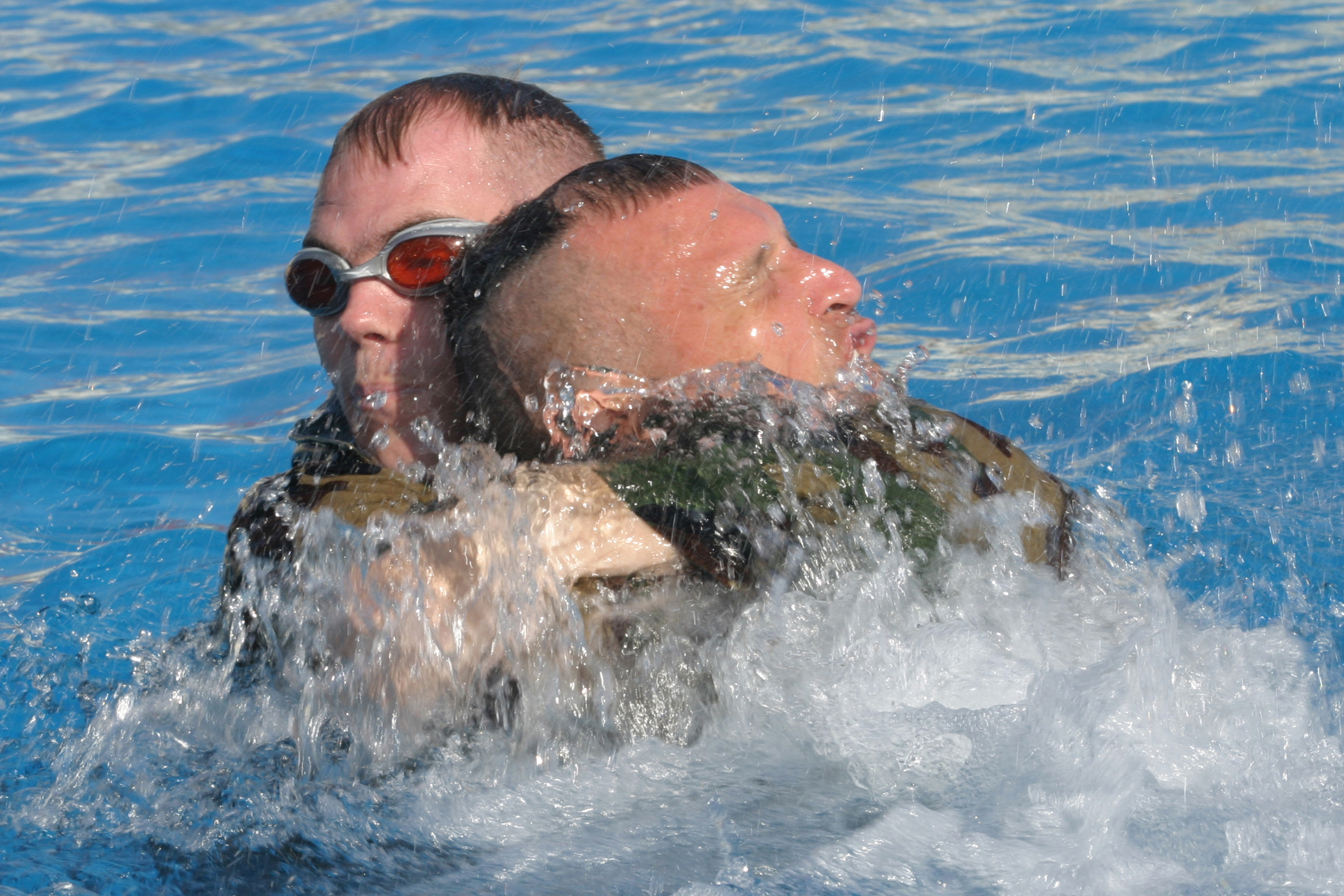
Two US Marines during a rescue training operation

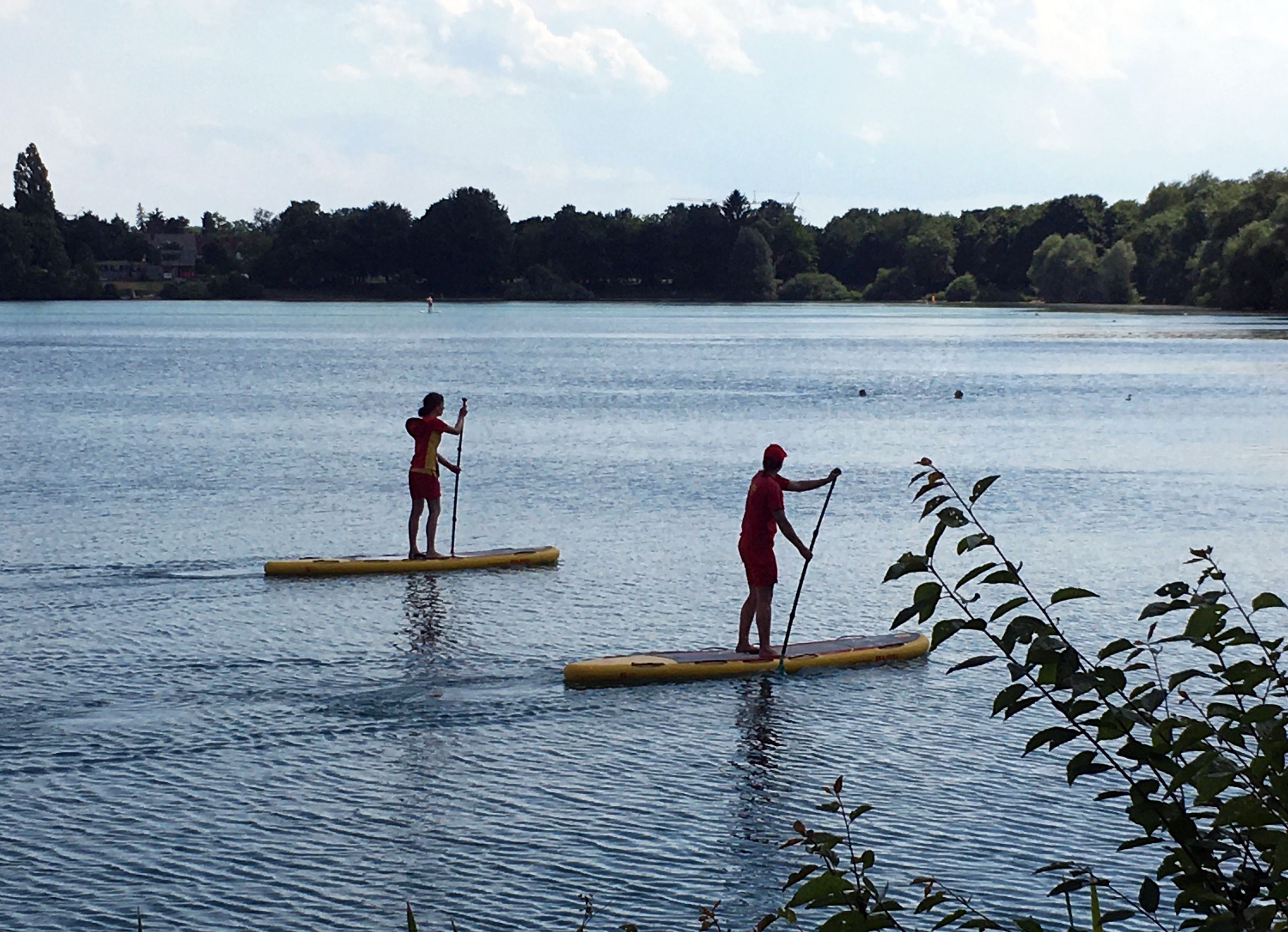
Two lifeguards of the German voluntary water rescue organization DLRG patrolling a public bathing area of a lake in Munich

Surface water rescue is defined as the rescue of a person who is afloat on the surface of a body of water.

Within Canada, any significant sized body of water, whether in mid-summer or winter, is considered cold water. Although multiple agencies respond to such rescues, including police, fire department, and emergency medical services, their functions, responsibilities, and level of training for such a technical rescue are quite different. As such, a best-practice will identify and adopt industry standards that include specific training and equipment. This supports the opinion that any individual entering the water for the purpose of rescue should be trained to the level of a Rescue Technician.

Personnel directly involved with support should be qualified to a minimum of an operations level while everyone else working in and around the scene should hold a minimum of an awareness qualification.

As with any rescue discipline, the knowledge and skill required to perform a rescue is not neatly packaged. For example, while performing a surface water rescue, a rescue team may utilize many skills that include search techniques, rope-work and rigging, emergency patient care, and a functional knowledge of confined space, swift-water, and dive recovery. Therefore, an effective rescue team will be trained with multiple technical disciplines.

In Canada, the standard for professional rescue is the National Fire Protection Association (NFPA 1006). This standard is used by the fire service and other professional public service rescue agencies. Access-Rescue Canada delivers NFPA compliant instructor-training programs to these public service agencies.

== See also ==
- International Life Saving Federation
- Royal Life Saving Society UK
- United States Lifesaving Association
