= Rope rescue =

Type of technical rescue using rope

Rope rescue is a subset of technical rescue that involves the use of rope, be it steel or cable rope, or more commonly used nylon, polyester, or other type of rope.

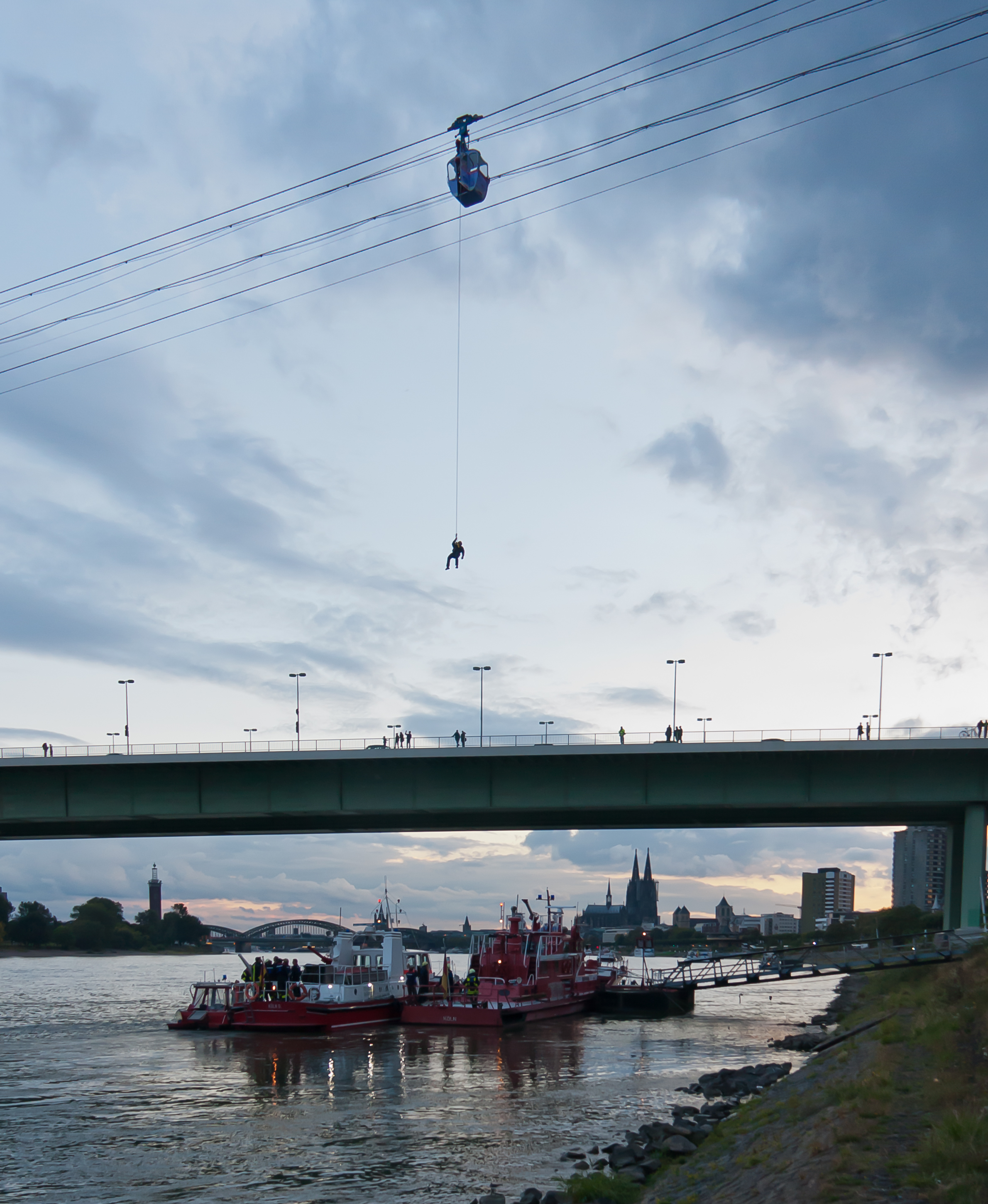
Rope rescue exercise on the Cologne Cable Car

== Principles ==
The key to any type of rescue is understanding and identifying the principles which are involved. Once the principles are identified, appropriate techniques or methods, which fits the circumstances, can be determined and applied. More recently, noncommittal vertical rescue techniques have been introduced. These skills make it possible to rescue a subject from a vertical environment without exposing the rescue professional (volunteer or paid) to the danger or risk of the vertical environment. These techniques involve skills used to rescue an individual(s) from their precarious situation, without sending a rescue professional over the edge or suspending them from the rope and safety equipment. An example of one such technique is the clip, snip, and lower/raise technique. It is often used for fall recovery and rescue. This technique involves using a specialty extension stick or pole to attach a rope to the subject. Once the rope is securely attached to the subject, they are either raised (hauled) up or lowered down to waiting emergency personnel.

Rescue should not be attempted by individuals who have not been formally trained. Local rescue authorities, fire departments, sheriff departments, etc. may be able to provide information on rope rescue training, practice, and equipment, and organizations who are actively looking for members. Courses exist that provide training towards the following qualifications: emergency medical responder (first responder, EMT, paramedic), heavy rescue technician, rope rescue technician, trench rescue technician, confined space rescue technician, hazardous materials technician, and swiftwater rescue technician.

== Types of rescue ==
These techniques are subdivided, and are sometimes the techniques and equipment are modified to better suit the specialty area. The subdivisions are: high angle urban/structural/mine rescue, wilderness/river/mountain rescue, and cave rescue. As a rule, urban or industrial rope rescue involves heavier equipment, which is chosen due to the close proximity to cities. Also due to this fact long approaches and lengthy extractions are not required. Wilderness and cave rescue generally involve a long approach to the rescue site, thus lighter weight equipment is desirable, and often required, so it can be carried/transported these great distances, or through tight passages, etc.. Due to this fact they usually involve extended rescue times as well. Although there is significant overlap in techniques and concepts, the two skill sets are often quite different and may not be interchangeable. What works in an urban environment may be cumbersome, clumsy, or ineffective in a wilderness or natural cave environment, or vice versa.

== Materials and techniques ==
=== Kernmantle rope ===
Kernmantle (kern = core and mantle = sheath) rope as it is called, is available in various types: dynamic (stretches to absorb the shock of a falling lead climber or rescue professional) or static (actually low stretch) which is most commonly used in rescue and industrial rope work.

=== Anchoring ===
Anchoring includes using specialty anchors, as well as things as simple as a length of chain, cable, rope, or webbing wrapped around a pillar, tree, boulder, or such. They provide the security and a point from which a person or subject (the word victim has dropped, and changed to subject, due to the negative implications of the term victim) can be belayed.

=== Belaying ===
Belaying is the act of protecting the climber, rescue professional, or subject in the event of a fall. Various other devices used, including friction rappel (lowering) devices, which acts as a braking device on the rope. They are used for lowering a load, a subject or oneself (rappelling).

=== Pulleys ===
Pulleys can serve as a mechanical advantage, along with rope grabs, and other tools, to raise, or haul, a load up a vertical section, or across a gully or canyon. Pulleys systems are used in conjunction with the rope, rope grabbing devices, i.e.: Prusiks, or mechanical grabs, to capture the progress made during the lift. Since pulley systems are generally short in length, they are used in conjunction with a progress (raise) capturing technique, and a long rope; and a backup safety or belay. This specialized equipment is used to reach the subject(s) and safely recover them.

== Organizations ==
In the United States, urban or structural rope rescue conducted by professional rescue agencies, such as emergency medical services (EMS), fire departments, and volunteer groups including sheriff’s department rescue teams, are influenced by a variety of standards and regulatory frameworks.

Several organizations publish standards or guidance relevant to these activities, including:

National Fire Protection Association (NFPA)

- NFPA 2500 Standard for Operations and Training for Technical Search and Rescue Incidents and Life Safety Rope and Equipment for Emergency Services (consolidates earlier standards)
- NFPA 1983 Standard on Life Safety Rope and Equipment for Emergency Services (now incorporated into NFPA 2500)
- NFPA 1670 Standard on Operations and Training for Technical Search and Rescue Incidents (now incorporated into NFPA 2500)
- NFPA 1858 Standard on Selection Care and Maintenance of Life Safety Rope and Equipment

American National Standards Institute (ANSI)

- ANSI/ASSE Z359 Fall Protection Code
- ANSI/ASSE Z117.1 Safety Requirements for Confined Spaces

Occupational Safety and Health Administration (OSHA)

- 29 CFR 1910.147 Control of Hazardous Energy (Lockout/Tagout)
- 29 CFR 1910.146 Permit-Required Confined Spaces (includes rescue provisions)
- 29 CFR 1910 Subpart D Walking-Working Surfaces (fall protection)
- 29 CFR 1926 Subpart M Fall Protection (construction)

National Institute for Occupational Safety and Health (NIOSH)

- NIOSH Request for Assistance in Preventing Occupational Fatalities in Confined Spaces
- NIOSH Alert: Preventing Falls of Fire Fighters at Elevations

Mine Safety and Health Administration (MSHA)

- 30 CFR Part 49 Mine Rescue Teams
- 30 CFR Part 56 / 57 Safety and Health Standards for Surface and Underground Mines
- 30 CFR Part 75 Underground Coal Mine Safety Standards

Regulations may apply to certain rescue operations depending on the circumstances and the organizations involved. By contrast, wilderness rope rescue is often not specifically covered by such mandates, except when the rescue is conducted by governmental agencies subject to federal or state occupational safety regulations. Appropriate medical care capability, typically basic life support, are required to be available during rescue incidents, although the specific level of medical certification necessary for individual rescuers may vary by organization and jurisdiction. In rescue environments, the actual rescuers who cut the vehicle and run the extrication scene or perform any procedure such as rope, low angle, etc., are likely to be first responders, emergency medical technicians, or paramedics.

== See also ==
- Cave rescue
- Rescue squad
- Emergency Medical Services
- 911th Engineer Company (Technical Rescue)
- Rescue
- Multnomah County Sheriff's Office Search and Rescue
- Marin County Sheriff's Office Search & Rescue
