= Searching =

Searching may refer to:

== General meanings ==
- Search (disambiguation)#General meanings

== Music ==
- "Searchin'", a 1957 song originally performed by The Coasters
- "Searching" (China Black song), a 1991 song by China Black
- "Searchin'" (CeCe Peniston song), a 1993 song by CeCe Peniston
- "Searchin' (I Gotta Find a Man)", a 1983 dance song by Hazell Dean
- "Searching" (INXS song), a 1997 song by INXS
- "Searching" (Pete Rock & CL Smooth song), a 1995 song from the Pete Rock & CL Smooth album The Main Ingredient
- "Searching (For Someone Like You)", a 1956 song by Kitty Wells
- Searching, a 2013 album by Jay Diggins
- "Searching", a 1980 single by Change
- "Searching", a 2004 song by Joe Satriani from his album Is There Love in Space?
- "Searchin'", a 1981 song on the Blackfoot album Marauder
- "Searching", a 1976 song by Lynyrd Skynyrd from the album Gimme Back My Bullets
- "Searching", a 1976 song by Roy Ayers from the album Vibrations
- "Searchin'", a 2003 song by Brant Bjork from the album Keep Your Cool
- "Searchin'", a 1996 song by Eminem from his album Infinite

== Other uses ==
- Searching (film), a 2018 American thriller film
  - Searching (film series), continuations of the 2018 film
- "Searching" (Desperate Housewives), an episode of the ABC television series Desperate Housewives
- Searching (horse), a racehorse

== See also ==
- The Search (disambiguation)
- Searcher (disambiguation)
- The Searchers (disambiguation)
- Search engine (disambiguation)
