= Search =

Search may refer to:

== General meanings ==
- Internet search or web search, the use of a search engine
  - Google Search, the search engine operated by Google
- Keyword search, a more general use in computing
- Search and rescue, search for and provision of aid to people who are in distress or imminent danger
- Search and destroy, a military strategy which consists of inserting forces into hostile territory and directing them to search and then attack enemy targets before immediately withdrawing
- Search and seizure, a legal term for a law enforcement power to commence a search of a person's property

== Arts and entertainment ==
- Search (American TV series), 1972–1973, science fiction
- Search (South Korean TV series), 2020
- Search (novel), a 2022 American novel by Michelle Huneven
- Search: The Naina Murder Case, a 2025 Indian television series
- "Search", a song by Moka Only from the album Vermilion, 2007

== Organizations ==
- Search (college selection service), founded 1966
- Search (band), a Malaysian rock band formed in 1981
- Society for Education Action and Research in Community Health, a non-governmental organization in Maharashtra, India
- Study of Environmental Arctic Change, a research program

== People ==
- Gay Search (born 1945), British television anchor and gardener
- Sara Opal Search (1890–1961), American composer
- Theodore C. Search (1841–1920), American business executive and founder of Philadelphia University

== See also ==
- The Search (disambiguation)
- Search engine (disambiguation)
- Search theory, in economics
- Underwater searches, procedures to find known or suspected target objects in a specified search area under water
- Water surface searches, procedures carried out on or over the surface of a body of water with the purpose of finding lost vessels, persons, or floating objects
