= The Search =

The Search may refer to:

== Arts and media ==
=== Film ===
- The Search (1948 film), an American drama movie directed by Fred Zinnemann and starring Montgomery Clift
- The Search (2009 film), a Tibetan romance movie
- The Search (2014 film), a remake of the 1948 movie
- The Search or La busca, a 1966 movie by Spanish director Angelino Fons

=== Television ===
- The Search (TV series), 2007, British
- The Search (American TV series), 1954-1955
- Crime Diaries: The Search, a 2020 Mexican crime web series
- Little Mix: The Search, a 2020 British television series
- "The Search", an episode of the 1965 Doctor Who serial The Space Museum
- "The Search", a 1983 episode of the cartoon He-Man and the Masters of the Universe
- "The Search" (King Rollo), a 1980 children's television episode
- "The Search" (The Office), a 2011 episode of the American version of The Office
- "The Search", a 1985 episode of the sitcom Punky Brewster
- "The Search" (Star Trek: Deep Space Nine), a 1994 Star Trek: Deep Space Nine episode

=== Literature ===
- The Search (novel), a 1964 book by Naguib Mahfouz
- The Search, a 1934 novel by C. P. Snow
- The Search: How Google and Its Rivals Rewrote the Rules of Business and Transformed Our Culture, a 2005 book by John Battelle
- The Search, a 2010 novel by Nora Roberts
- Avatar: The Last Airbender – The Search, a graphic novel released in 2013
- "The Search" (short story), 1943, by A. E van Vogt, featuring time travel

=== Music ===
- The Search: 1985–1989, retrospective CD from American hardcore punk band Bold
- The Search (Son Volt album), by alt-country band Son Volt in 2007
- The Search (NF album), a 2019 album by American rapper NF
  - The Search (song), the title track and second single from the above album
- "The Search", a song by the Cherry Poppin' Daddies from the album Rapid City Muscle Car, 1994

== See also ==
- Search (disambiguation)
- Searcher (disambiguation)
- Searching (disambiguation)
