= Michelle Huneven =

American novelist

- Born: August 14, 1953 (age 73); Altadena, California, U.S.
- Education: Iowa Writers' Workshop (MFA); Claremont School of Theology
- Occupations: Novelist; journalist
- Writing career
- Genre: Fiction
- Notable awards: Whiting Award (2002)
- Website: www.michellehuneven.com

Michelle Huneven (born August 14, 1953) is an American novelist and journalist. Huneven was born and raised in Altadena, California, where she returned to live in 2001. In January 2025, her home was destroyed in the Eaton Fire. She received an MFA from the Iowa Writers' Workshop at the University of Iowa and attended the Methodist Claremont School of Theology to become a UU minister, but she quit after two years to write novels. Huneven's sixth novel, "Bug Hollow" will be published on June 17, 2025.

== Fiction ==
Huneven’s novels explore related themes of recovery and maturation. Her first novel, Round Rock (Knopf 1997), follows a graduate student's reluctant path to sobriety at a drunk farm in rural California. Jamesland (Knopf 2003) is set in the Los Feliz neighborhood of Los Angeles, where three struggling souls—a Unitarian minister, a descendant of William James, and an erstwhile chef—help each other learn to get by. Both novels were designated "Notable Books of the Year" by The New York Times. "Round Rock" and "Jamesland" were published by Knopf.

Her third novel, Blame (2009), was a finalist for the National Book Critics Circle Award for fiction. It portrays the journey of a young history professor after accidentally killing two people while driving drunk. Her fourth novel, Off Course, was published in April 2014 by Farrar, Straus and Giroux.

In "Off Course," (FSG, 2014), Huneven tells the story of an economics graduate student trying to finish her dissertation, while living in her parents' cabin in the Southern Sierras and becoming instead entangled in the small community there. "Search" received a starred review in Kirkus, which described it as "Sensitive, reflective and uncomfortably true to life, with a wonderfully rich cast of supporting characters." In a "Briefly Noted," the New Yorker wrote "Huneven’s touch is sure, and her protagonist is simultaneously sympathetic and maddening. The landscape descriptions are erotic, and the erotic scenes have near-hallucinatory power."

Huneven's fifth novel, Search came out in April 2022 and tells the story of a Unitarian Universalist church's search for a new minister. The narrator is a restaurant reviewer and former seminarian, who joins the search committee in the interest of writing a memoir, ultimately called Search.

Griffin Dunne described "Bug Hollow," as telling the "wondrous and intimate journey of the Samuelson family . . . with their deepest secrets, greatest loves, epic heartbreaks, and a grief that touched them all for generations.". "Bug Hollow" received starred reviews from Kirkus Reviews and Library Journal. The American Booksellers Association selected it for the July 2025 Indie Next List. It was also selected as a New York Times Summer Reading Pick, One of 50 books TODAY can’t wait to read in 2025, one of Oprah Daily Best Summer Reads of 2025, a Boston Globe Best of Summer 2025, One of LitHub’s Novels to Read This Summer, Kirkus 20 Best Books to Read in June and an Amazon Editor's Pick.

Huneven's short fiction has been published in Harper's, Redbook, and literary magazines. She received a Whiting Award in 2002.

== Food writing and other nonfiction ==
Huneven has worked as a restaurant critic and food writer for the LA Weekly and the LA Times. Her food journalism has also been published in The New York Times, O, Gourmet, Food and Wine, and other publications. She won the 1995 award for Newspaper Feature Writing from the James Beard Foundation and several American Food Journalists awards.

Huneven co-authored the Tao Gals’ Guide to Real Estate (Bloomsbury 2006), a combination narrative and guidebook for women purchasing homes. Her essays have appeared in the following anthologies: Horse People, Dog is My Co-Pilot, The Knitter's Gift, Death by Pad Thai, Mr. Wrong, and "Selfish, Shallow, and Self-Absorbed, sixteen writers on the decision not to have kids."

She teaches creative writing at UCLA.

== Eaton Fire ==
On January 8, 2025, the Eaton Fire destroyed Huneven's home and the rental property she owned next door.
