= Underwater searches =

Techniques for finding underwater targets

Underwater searches are procedures to find a known or suspected target object or objects in a specified search area under water. They may be carried out underwater by divers, manned submersibles, remotely operated underwater vehicles, or autonomous underwater vehicles, or from the surface by other agents, including surface vessels, aircraft and cadaver dogs.

A search method attempts to provide full coverage of the search area, and to do this a search pattern is usually applied, which is a systematic procedure for covering the search area. This is greatly influenced by the width of the sweep or sensor swath, which largely depends on the method used to detect the target. For divers in conditions of zero visibility, this is as far as the diver can feel with their hands while proceeding along the pattern, while for towed pinger locators it may be more than a kilometre to each side. When visibility is better, it depends on the distance at which the target can be seen from the pattern, or detected by sonar, optical sensors or magnetic field anomalies. In all cases, the search pattern should completely cover the search area without excessive redundancy or missed areas. Overlap is needed to compensate for inaccuracy and sensor error, and may be necessary to avoid gaps in some patterns.

== Diver searches ==
Diver searches are underwater searches carried out by divers. There are a number of techniques in general use by commercial, scientific, public service, military, and recreational divers. Some of these are suitable for scuba, and some for surface supplied diving. The choice of search technique will depend on logistical factors, terrain, protocol and diver skills.

As a general principle, a search method attempts to provide 100% coverage of the search area. this is greatly influenced by the width of the sweep. In conditions of zero visibility this is as far as the diver can feel with his hands while proceeding along the pattern. When visibility is better, it depends on the distance at which the target can be seen from the pattern. In all cases then, the pattern should be accurate and completely cover the search area without excessive redundancy or missed areas. Overlap is needed to compensate for inaccuracy, and may be necessary to avoid gaps in some patterns.

=== Search patterns controlled by ropes and lines ===
==== Circular search ====
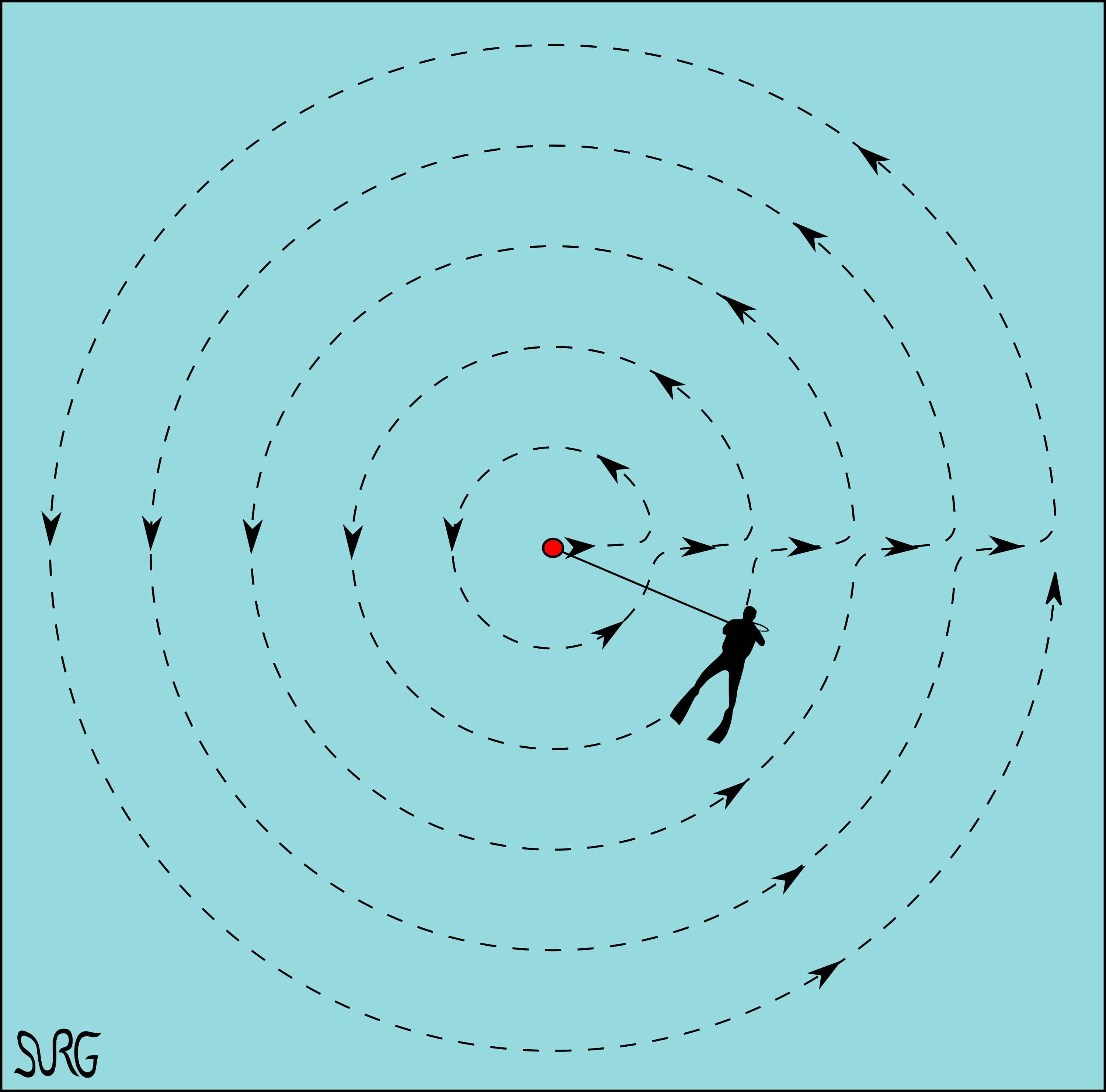
Standard circular search pattern

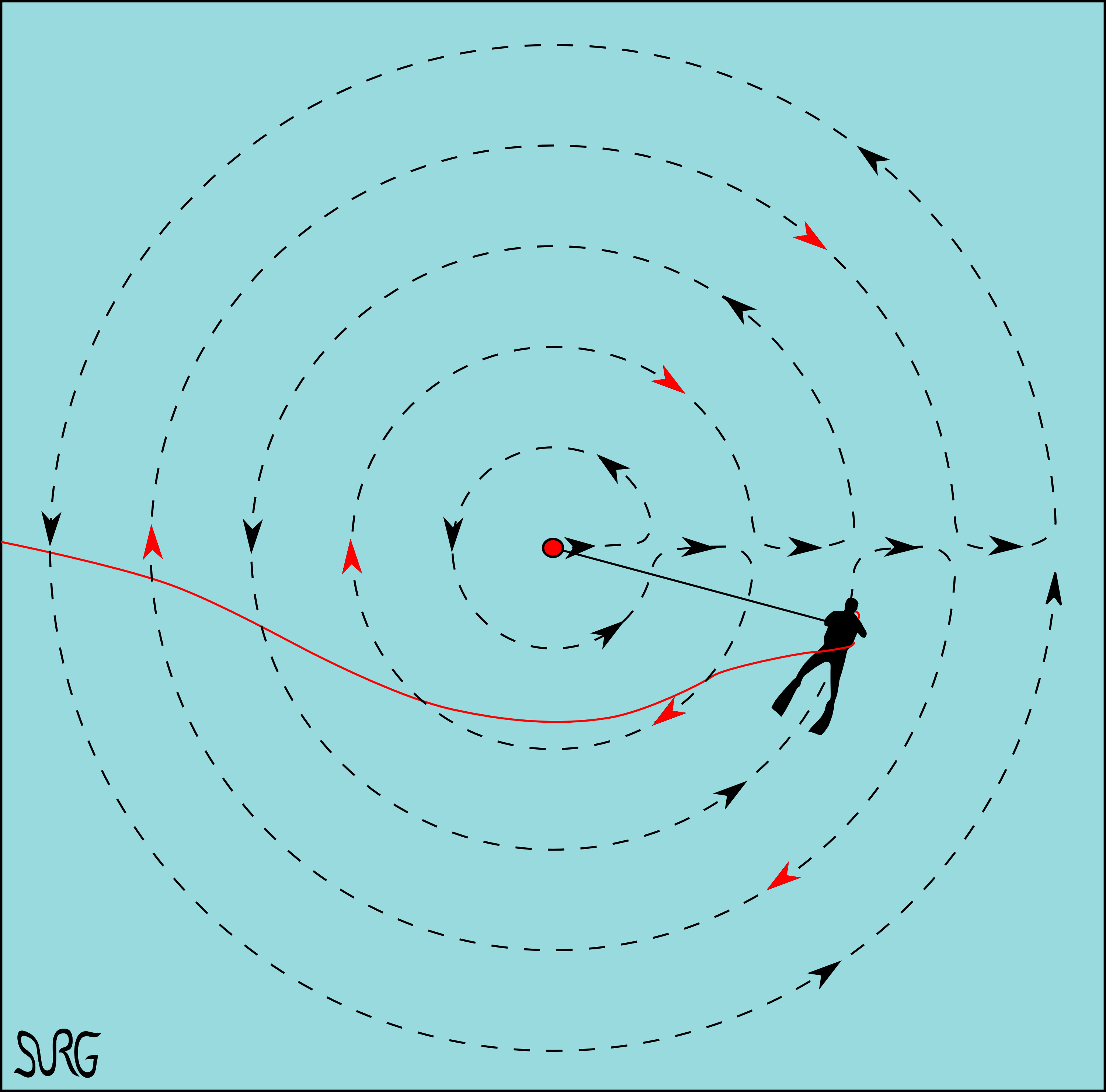
Circular search pattern modified to avoid twisting or fouling an umbilical or lifeline

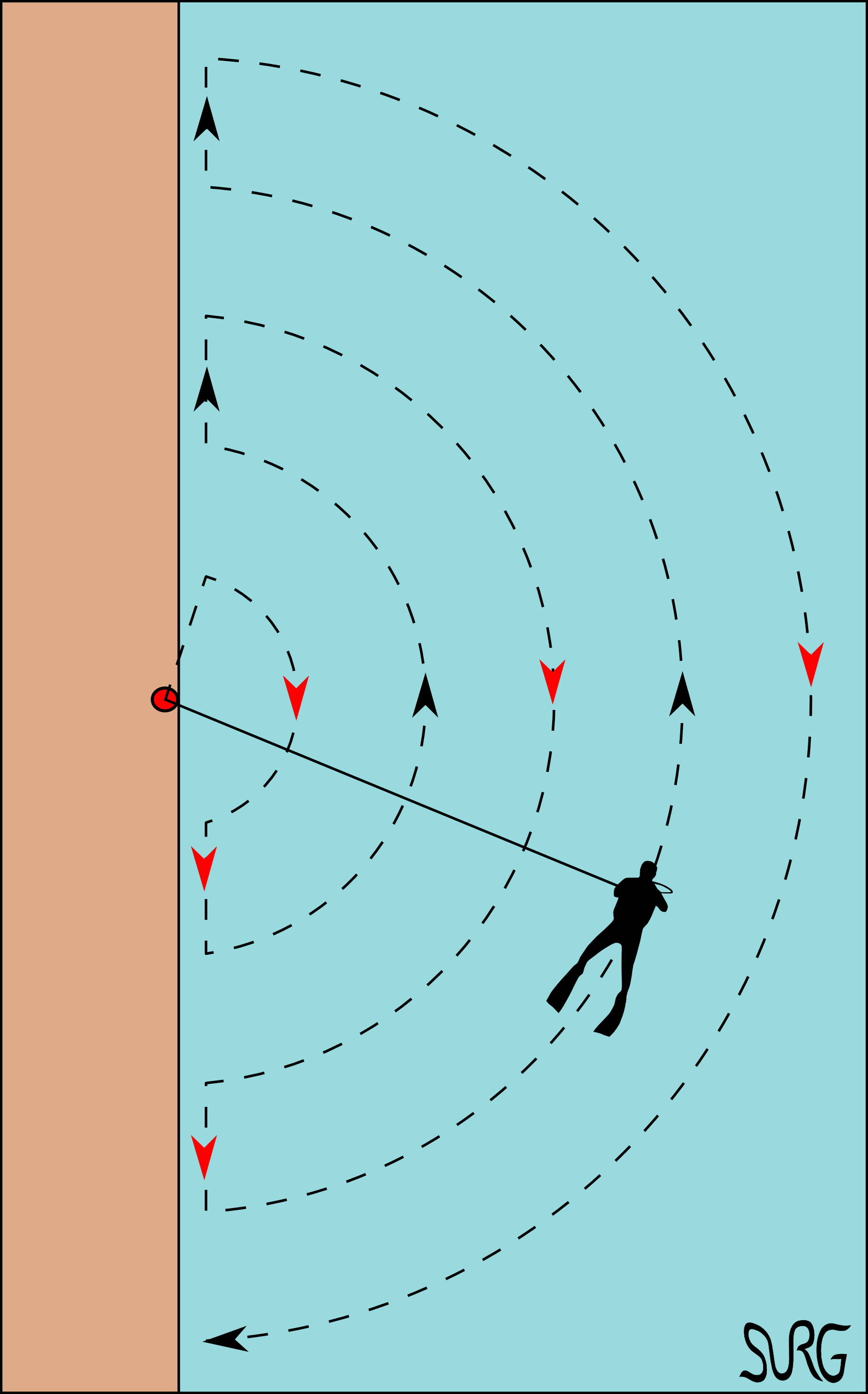
Pendulum search pattern along a wall

An underwater circular search is a procedure conducted by a diver moving around a fixed reference point, usually by swimming, at a series of distances (radii). The circular search is simple and requires little equipment. It is useful where the position of the objects of the search is known with reasonable accuracy.

===== Procedure =====
The general procedure is to start from a fixed central point, and to search the circumference of a circle where the radius is defined by a search line anchored at the central point. The radius of the circle is dependent on visibility, and is increased after each circle has been completed, by an amount which allows the diver to either see or feel an overlap between the current arc and the previous arc.

One end of the distance line is carried by the diver and the other is attached to the datum position by any appropriate method. E.g. clipped to the base of a shot line, pegged into the bottom, tied to a fixed object on the bottom or held by another diver. The diver may tow a surface marker buoy to show their position to the support team if conditions allow. The diver unreels a section of distance line appropriate to the visibility and marks the start position by a peg, loose marker, compass heading, or a pre-laid marker line extending outwards from the datum position. Then, keeping the line taut, the diver proceeds in a circle with the line as radius, searching visually or by feel until back at the start position. The diver then unreels another section of line of the same length and repeats the procedure until they find the object, run into obstacles or run out of line, air or time.

The amount of distance line increment for each sweep should allow some overlap of sweeps to avoid the risk of missing the target between sweeps. If a buddy is involved the most efficient place is alongside the controlling diver on the line, and the extension of distance line for each sweep can be roughly doubled. Depending on the circumstances, control of the pattern may be from the surface, from a diver at the central point, or by the diver at the end of the search line, who would in that case control the search line reel.

===== Variations on the circular search =====
In some cases a second diver can establish themself at a fixed point on the bottom and act as both the central point and line tender. The diver and line tender communicate with each other using line pull signals. When the diver has completed a full revolution of the search, the tender signals the diver and advances another section of line so the search can be expanded further from the central point. Another variation uses more than one diver along the search line. The divers are evenly spaced at a distance depending on visibility, and the increase in radius allows overlap of search area only for the innermost diver on the line. This variation becomes more difficult to coordinate with a larger number of divers, particularly in poor visibility.

A major variation on the circular search is the pendulum search, also known as the arc or fishtail search. in which the diver stops and changes direction at the end of each arc. This is used when there is insufficient space to complete a circle, as when controlled from the shore, when the search area is limited to a sector to one side of the control point, or there is a major obstruction limiting the extent of the searchable sector. Divers on surface supply may change direction at the end of each arc even when using a full 360° pattern to avoid twisting the umbilical. The pendulum search can also be done with more than one diver on the search line, but this requires considerable skill and co-ordination, particularly in low visibility.

Another variation is used where the target is large enough to snag the search line, In this case the diver may go out to the full radius of the search area and make a single sweep, hoping to snag the target with the line. If on his return to the start line or bearing, he finds he is closer to the centre point, he will swim back along the line in the expectation of having snagged something. With some luck it will be the target of the search.

If the target is not found by the time the search pattern has reached maximum convenient radius, the centre point may be shifted and another search started. This can be repeated as often as necessary, but the positions of the centre points must be chosen to allow the full search area to be covered. This implies quite a lot of overlap, and the pattern is not efficient. The most efficient pattern uses an equilateral triangular grid, but this may have to be modified to suit the site.

The circular search is very popular as it does not require complicated setup and can be done by most divers without a great deal of special training. It is effective where the position of the target is known with reasonable accuracy, where the bottom terrain does not have major snags, and where the depth variation during each arc is acceptable.

===== Safety =====
Divers should be well trained in general diving skills before attempting this type of search. The search diver is responsible for maintaining sufficient tension on the search line so the signals can be transmitted and received. If a surface marker is used, slack in the line should be kept to a minimum to avoid entanglement. This is easiest if a reel is used to control the line, or alternatively the line should be buoyant, to keep it as far from the divers as possible, but buoyant lines will still tend to wrap around the shotline in the centre if there is enough slack.

==== Jackstay searches ====
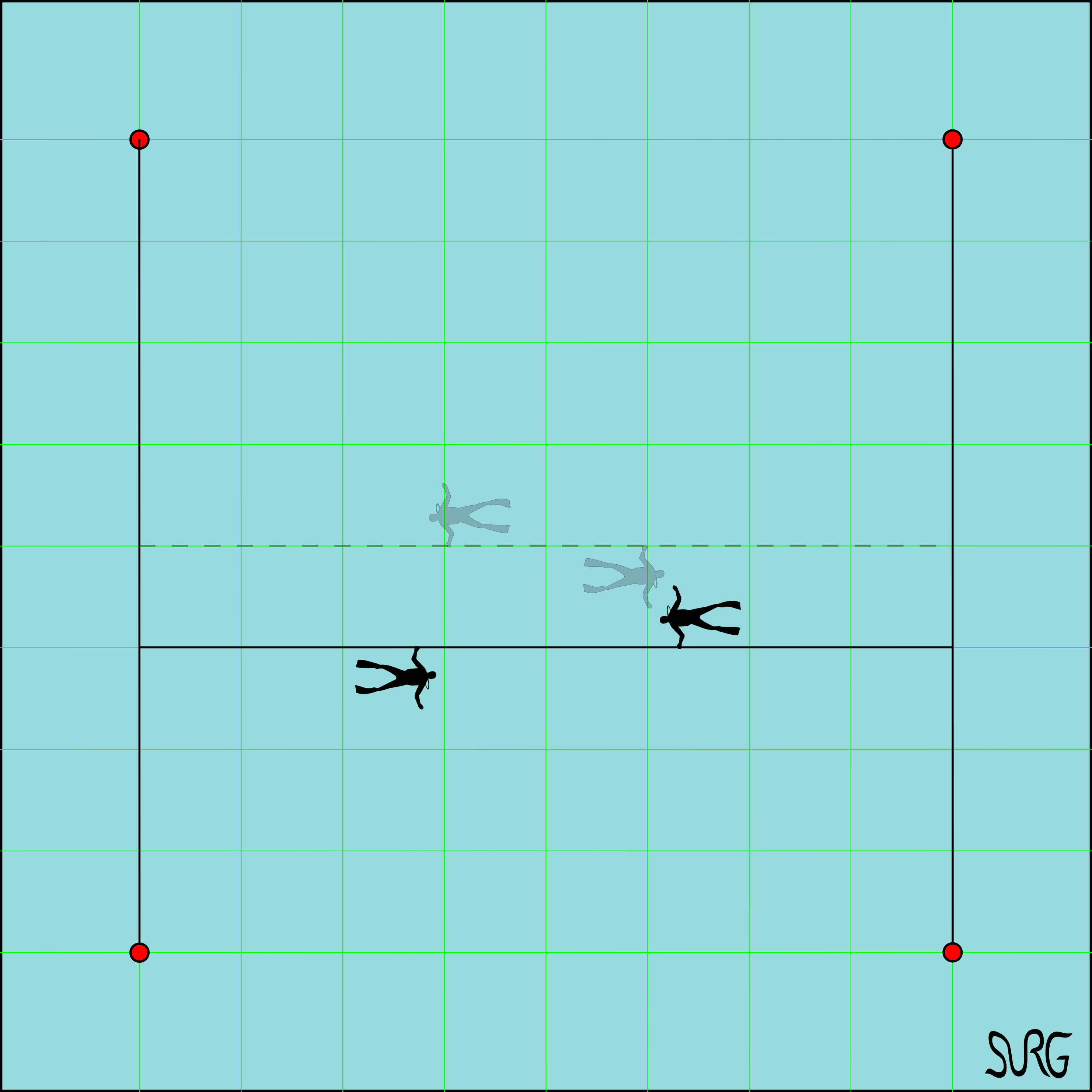
Jackstay search pattern

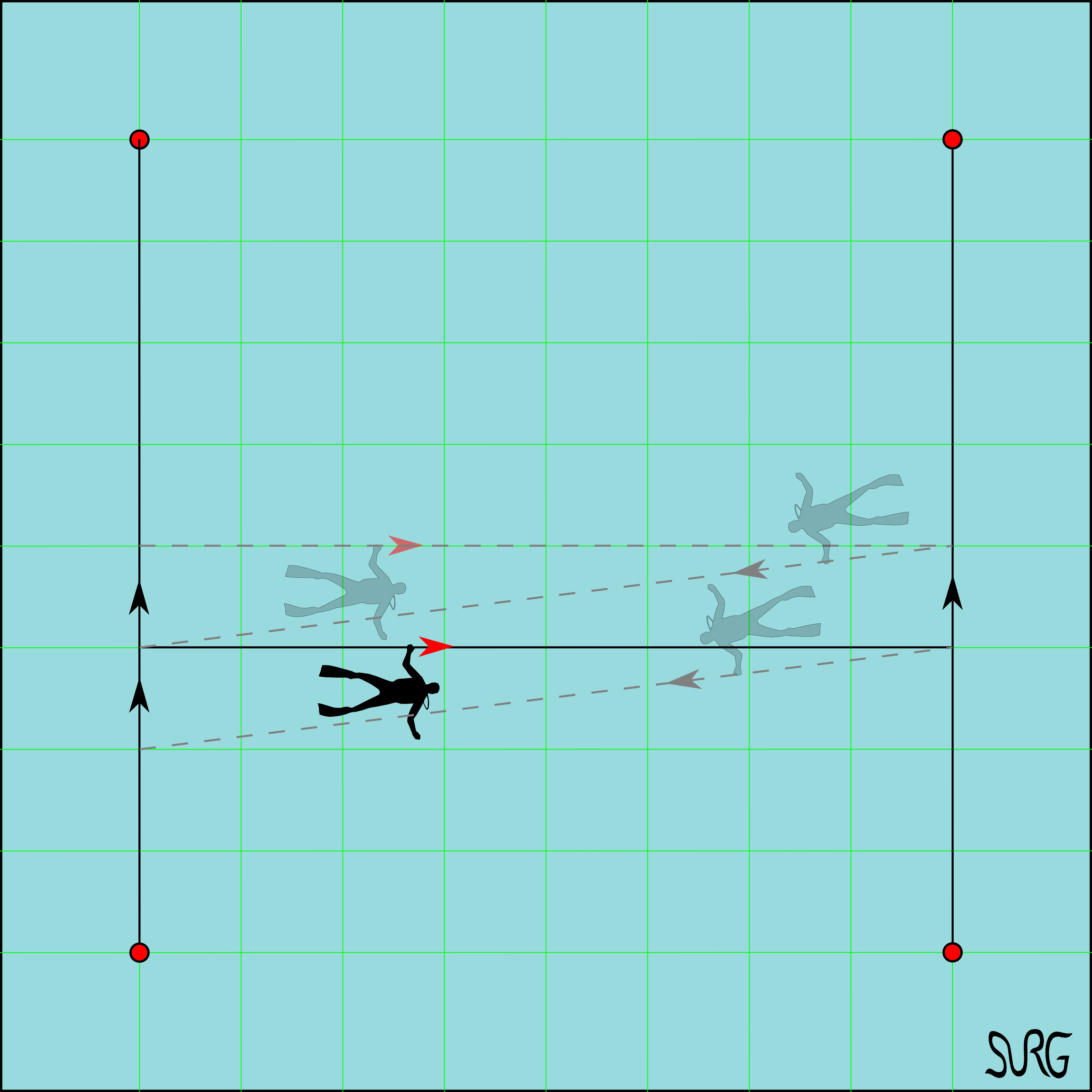
Jackstay "J" search pattern

An underwater jackstay search is a procedure conducted by divers swimming along a search line, the jackstay. There are various techniques for performing a jackstay search.

===== Procedure =====
The procedure for a search using two fixed jackstays and a movable search line is described:

The distance between the fixed jackstays will depend on circumstances, but should not be so long that reliable overlapping of sweeps is prevented. This will depend on the bottom terrain. Two divers are generally used on this search system. Two heavy jackstays are laid parallel to each other across the bottom of the search area. A lighter movable jackstay is used to connect the fixed jackstays at one end of the search area. This line is kept reasonably taut, but must not pull the fixed jackstays together.

The divers start at opposite ends of the movable jackstay and swim along it, each diver holding the line with his left hand (or right, but both must use the same hand to keep them on opposite sides of the line) and searching the bottom visually or by feel on his side of the line until he passes the other diver and reaches the other fixed jackstay, at which point he will signal to the other diver that he has reached this point by a pull signal on the movable jackstay.

When both divers are at the fixed jackstays they will shift the movable jackstay along the fixed jackstays by an agreed distance depending on conditions. The distance should be large enough to reduce excessive overlap, but small enough that there is no risk of missing the target between traverses. This usually means that the distance is between the reach of the divers searching by feel in low visibility, and the distance they can see to the sides plus width of the target in good visibility. Care must be taken to always shift the movable jackstay in the same direction. This can be easily confused in low visibility, so a compass can be used to prevent this problem.

The divers then repeat this process until they find the object or run out of fixed jackstay, time or air. When a diver finds the object he should signal this to the other diver by rope pulls. The second diver can join him to confirm the finding and mark it or continue the search. If the movable jackstay snags it should be freed by the divers as the pass the snag. The sweep may have to be repeated after freeing a snag. The method of attaching the movable jackstay should be easily adjustable, but reliable.

If a series of sweeps does not find the object, one of the fixed jackstays may be lifted and re-laid on the opposite side of the remaining one, and the process repeated until the target is found or the entire search area has been searched.

===== Variations on the jackstay search =====
If the body of water is narrow enough, a surface team can lay a single jackstay across the width of the bottom, and the diver/s swim from one side to the other. When they reach the end of the line in the water, the surface team advance the jackstay by an appropriate amount by lifting it, moving it parallel to the original position and laying it down again, at which stage the divers make another sweep. This is repeated as often as necessary.

Another method, sometimes called a "J" search, and suitable for a solo diver, involves the diver or divers starting at the same end of the search line, which is similarly set along the edge of the search area. The two divers swim together, one on each side of the line, thereby searching the area immediately to either side of the line.

Once they have completed the sweep, they reset the end of the line a few meters further into the search area, so that the line now runs at a slight angle to its original course. They then sweep back along the line, either searching much of the same ground over again, or simply returning to the start point. Once they reach the start point, they then move the other end of the line a few meters further into the search area so that the line is once again parallel to its original position.

They repeat this pattern until the object of the search is located, or until they cover the entire search area. This second method is longer and slower, and is used more frequently either in extremely limited visibility, where the divers do not wish to lose contact with each other, or where the object sought is particularly small, and they wish to run the pattern twice, once from each side, in case the object is masked by a larger object on the sea bed when approach from one side, and particularly where only one diver is available to do the search.

===== Safety =====
Divers should be well trained before attempting this type of search. Solo divers should be used only when a risk assessment indicates that the risks are acceptable, and preferably should indicate their position with a surface marker or be in communication with the surface by line or voice.

===== Snag-line search =====
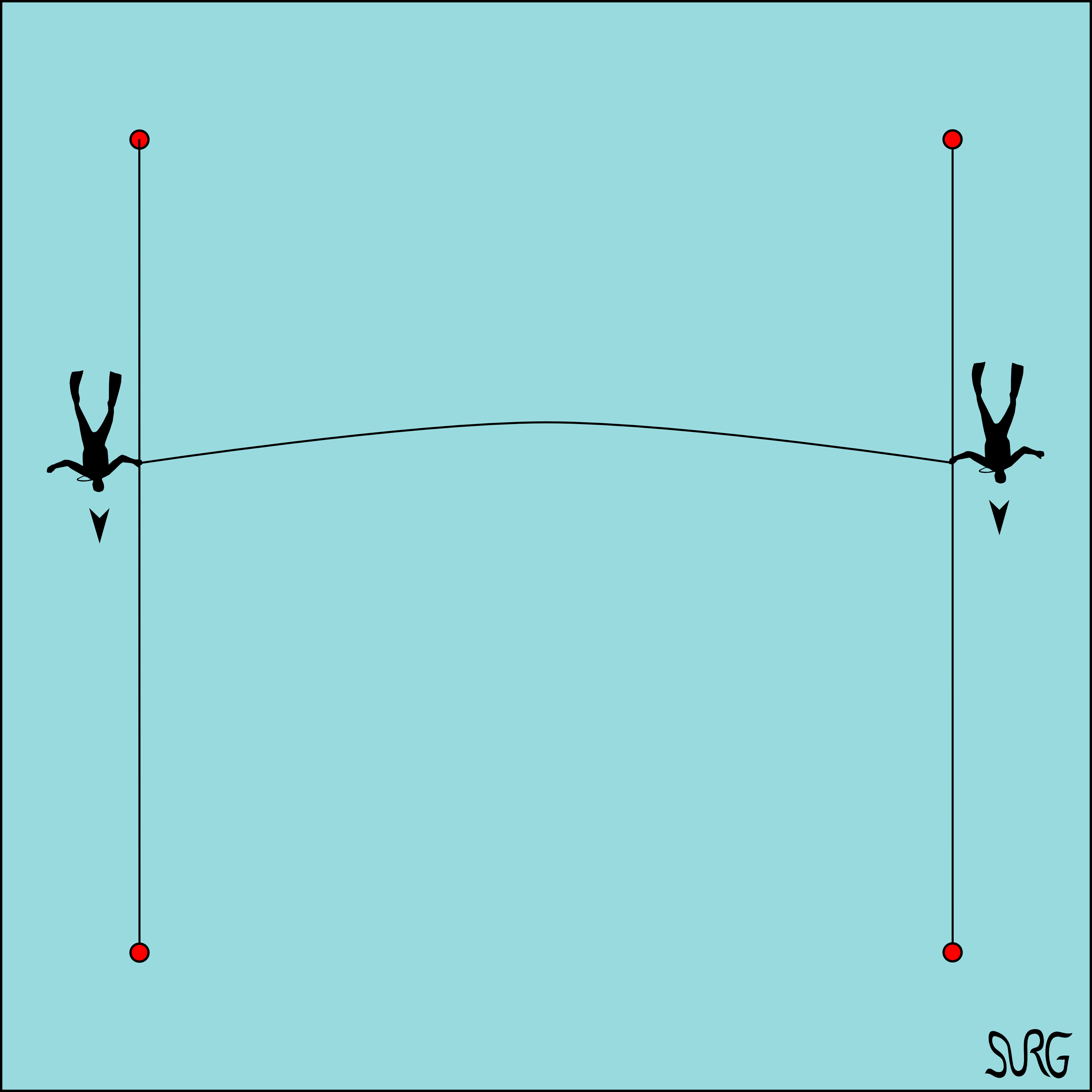
Snagline search pattern using jackstays to define the search area

When the object of the search is large enough and of suitable form to snag a dragged line, a snag-line may be used to speed up the process. The snag-line may be used with a pair of fixed jackstays or as a distance line for a circular search. It is often a weighted line, though there may be times when this is not required. The snag-line is held taut by the diver or divers, who will then drag it along the bottom as they either follow the jackstays or swim the arc until it hooks on something. When this happens the divers fasten their snag-line ends in position by tying or clipping them to the jackstays or pegging them to the ground, and swim along the snag-line to identify the target, If it is the object of the search, they will mark it, otherwise they free the line, move it over the target, return to their ends and continue the sweep.

=== Cave diving emergency searches ===
Separation from the guideline in a cave can be a life-threatening emergency. If a diver loses the guideline, it is their first priority to find it again. For the rest of the team if they have not lost the guideline, finding the lost buddy is their second priority after ensuring their own safety. Both of these situations are emergencies that cave divers are trained to respond to, but there is no method that guarantees success for either problem in all situations. This is a risk that scuba divers must accept if they choose to dive in caves.

==== Searches for lost guideline ====
There are two types of lost line situation in penetration diving. One is when a diver is separated from the line and does not know where it or the other divers are, and the other is when the team find that the guideline ahead of them has broken and the other end is not in sight. The first type is a life-threatening emergency for the diver who has lost the line, the second type is a life-threatening emergency to the dive team if it occurs during the exit, but an inconvenience on the way in, as they can turn back at any time, though an attempt to find the other end and repair the line is normal practice.

Losing the guide line in a cave is a potentially life-threatening emergency. While following recommended best practice makes it highly unlikely that a diver will lose the line, it can and does happen, and there are procedures which will usually work to find it again. Any reliable information on where the diver is likely to be relative to the last known position of the line may be critical, and the procedure of choice will depend on what is reliably known. In all situations, the diver will attempt to stabilise the situation and avoid getting further lost, and make a thorough visual check in all directions from where they are at the time, taking into account the possibility of the line being in a line trap. If the diver has not also separated from their buddy, the buddy may know where the line is, and can be asked, and if the diver is separated from their buddy, the buddy may be at the line, and the buddy's light may be visible.

Stabilising the position is generally done by finding the nearest feasible tie-off point and securely tying off a search line. The direction of the guide line when last seen should be known, and therefore the direction the diver was swimming in before losing the line. If the diver was neutrally buoyant while following the line, the approximate depth can be reconstructed by finding the depth of neutral buoyancy again, without adjusting inflation of BCD or dry suit. Unless the line was lost by the diver not noticing a change of direction, it is likely to be at much the same depth, in much the same direction, and at a similar lateral and vertical distance as when last seen, making it logical to try that direction first. While swimming towards the estimated position of the line and slowly paying out search line, the diver will search visually, and in low visibility or darkness, also by feel, making arm sweeps across the expected direction of the line, while defending the head from impact with the other arm. The distance swum towards the estimated position of the lost line can be measured by the spacing and number of knots paid out on the search line. If the search fails, the diver will return to the tie off and try again in the next best guess for the direction the line may be. The diver may also choose to try a different search method. The best search method for any given situation will depend on the water conditions, the layout of the section of cave, the way the line was laid, the situational knowledge and skills of the diver, and the equipment available – a method that would be ideal for one situation might not work at all for another.

If the line is found, but not the other divers, the diver can tie off their search reel to the guide line as an indicator to other members of the team that they were lost but have found the guide line, and indicate the direction that they intend to proceed along the guideline with a personal directional marker so that others who see it while searching for the lost diver will know whether the diver chose the right direction to exit the cave. A compass is usually a reliable indicator of direction in a cave, but only useful if the diver knows the approximate direction they were swimming before losing the line, as some caves have many changes of direction along the passages.

==== Lost buddy search ====
A diver on an intact guide line is generally not considered lost. It is the diver who has lost the guide line who is lost, so the most important consideration for searching for a lost diver is not to lose the guide line. This is generally the converse situation to the lost guide line, in that the diver loses contact with their buddy or team but remains in contact with the guide line, so is not themself lost. Their first priority is to not get lost or disorientated, and in furtherance of this aim would attach a directional line marker to the guide line indicating the direction to the exit before starting a search. The search line can be tied to the directional maker to prevent it from sliding along the line during the search. The direction for the search would depend on the layout of that part of the cave, and where the missing diver should have been in the group. The search party must consider their own safety first, regarding how much gas they can afford to use in a search, which will depend on the stage of the dive when the diver is noticed to be missing. When searching in darkness, the searches should periodically turn off their lights as this will allow them to see the lost diver's light more easily.

=== Search patterns controlled by compass directions ===
Compass directed searches do not require extensive preparation and can be performed with very little additional equipment, but require suitable conditions and a relatively high level of navigational skill. They can be significantly degraded by currents which will offset the divers from the theoretical search pattern in proportion to elapsed time and current velocity. They are best suited to targets that will easily be seen, and require the diver's attention to be divided between the compass and the visual search, so work best where the water visibility and target characteristics allow the spotting of the target by peripheral vision while focused on accurately following the search pattern.

==== Spiral box search ====
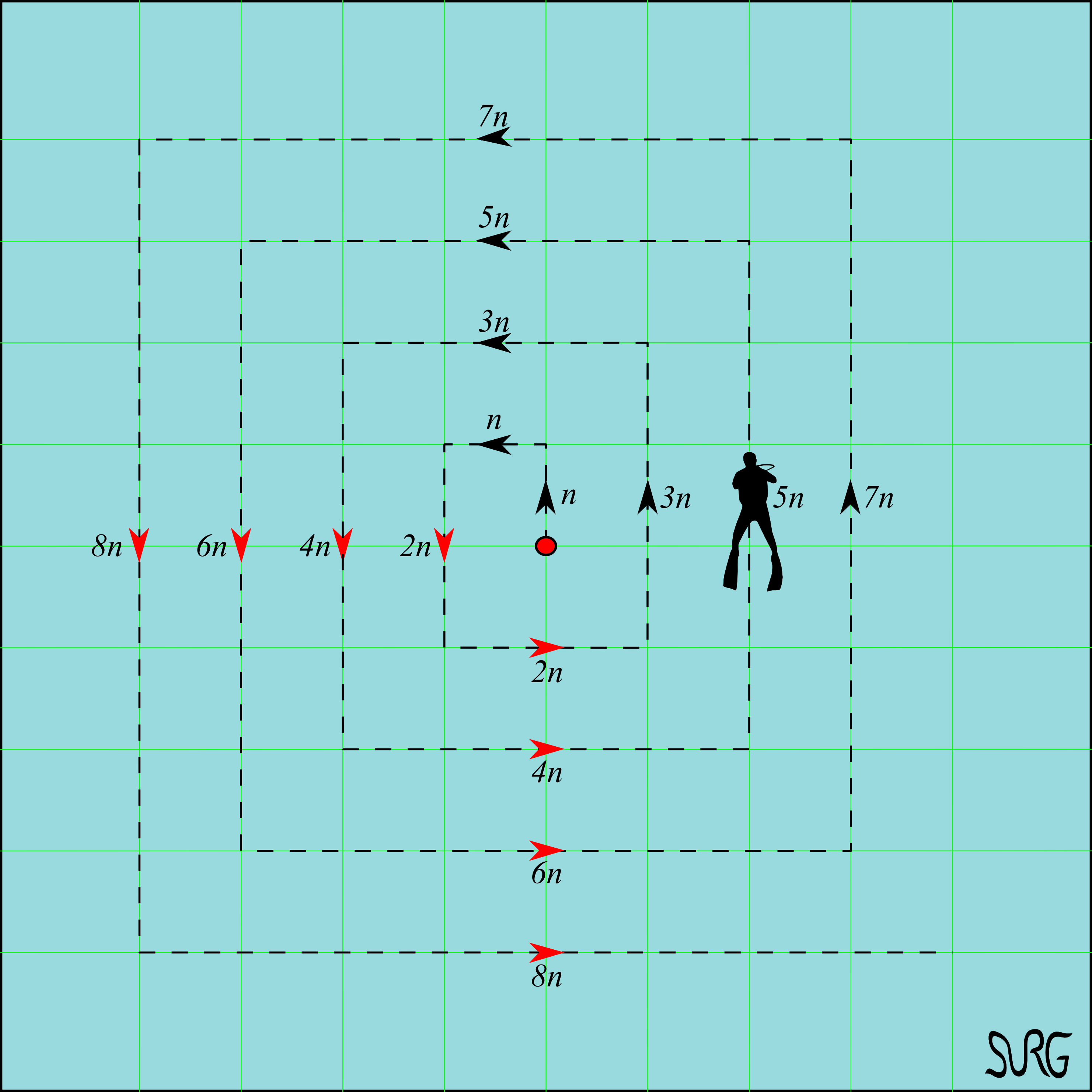
The spiral box search pattern

An underwater spiral box search is a search procedure conducted by a diver swimming around a starting point on a pattern based on compass directions and increasing distances. The pattern resembles an outward spiral with straight sides and equal distances between legs swum on the same bearing. The legs are normally swum with 90 degree change in direction between them, and very often the cardinal directions are used for ease of navigation. The spiral may be clockwise or anticlockwise, and in theory there is no limit to the area which can be covered. In practice, the diver may encounter an obstacle such as the shore, or will run out of air or energy, which will terminate the pattern. Finding a specified target would also result in the termination of the search in most cases.

===== Procedure =====
The technique is to start at the estimated position of the target, at a distance above the bottom to provide the best view, and to swim in a cardinal direction a distance roughly equal to or slightly greater than the visibility range. The estimate of distance is commonly by kick counts, so using a whole number of kicks is necessary, and preferably a number which can be mentally accumulated by the diver. Call this distance n kicks, where n is usually 2, 4, 5, 10 or 20 as these are easy numbers to multiply mentally. The direction of turn may be clockwise or anticlockwise as best suits the search.

For example: The diver swims n kicks to the north, turns left and swims n kicks to the west, then turns left and swims 2n kicks to the south, left again and 2n kicks to the east. Then left again and 3n kicks to the north, left and 3n kicks to the west. The pattern is repeated by adding an extra n kicks every second turn, and always turning the same way. If at any stage the diver wants to return to the start point, he will swim a half leg count followed by the usual turn and another half leg count.

===== Applications =====
This search pattern is particularly suited for occasions when the approximate position of the search target is known, but the divers have no facilities for setting up a position marker or search lines, but have a compass and the skills to use it effectively. The pattern is not greatly affected by obstructions and potential snags, but works best with targets that are relatively easy to see, and that usually implies fairly large size and fairly good visibility. The gap between the parallel legs is chosen for easy counting and sufficient overlap to provide a good chance of spotting the target.

The pattern is not suited to water where there is a current, though moderate surge does not make much difference to the accuracy, provided the horizontal movement due to the surge is not bigger than the overlap between two adjacent parallel legs. Errors are cumulative: A return to the centre is a good check for accuracy. If the diver ends up close to the start point, the pattern was swum accurately.

==== Compass grid search ====
An underwater compass grid search is a search pattern conducted by a diver swimming parallel lines on a compass bearing and its reciprocal while conducting a visual search of the area bordering the track. The separation between lines is chosen to allow sufficient overlap to ensure a high probability of the search target being seen if the diver passes by. Cardinal directions are often chosen for ease of navigation, but topographical constraints may dictate bearings that suit the site better.

===== Procedure =====
The diver or divers swim pre-arranged compass courses arranged in a grid pattern to cover the search area.

===== Applications =====
A large number of divers can be simultaneously deployed to cover a large search area quickly, or a single diver can methodically work through the same area. The pattern is limited to relatively low current speeds, as the current will set the divers off their planned paths.

==== Ladder search ====
This pattern is a version of the grid search where the length of the leg is relatively short. It is more limited, but works well in narrow passages, like a river or canal. The search pattern is swimming back and forth on reciprocal headings with an equal offset in the same direction at the end of each leg. Direction of the legs is usually determined by some geographical feature, and the bezel of the compass can be set to those directions. If the direction of the channel changes it may be necessary to change the search leg headings accordingly, so that they remain roughly transverse to the channel. The offset is not critical for direction, and so long as it is roughly correct will be OK. The length of the search legs will usually also be determined by some physical feature like the width of the canal, or reaching a depth of 10m, and the legs may not be of constant length. What is important is that they are parallel and each is offset the same amount in the same direction, so that the search area is covered completely. The search pattern corresponds closely to that of the Jackstay grid search, and is sometimes referred to as a U-pattern search.

==== Swim-line search ====
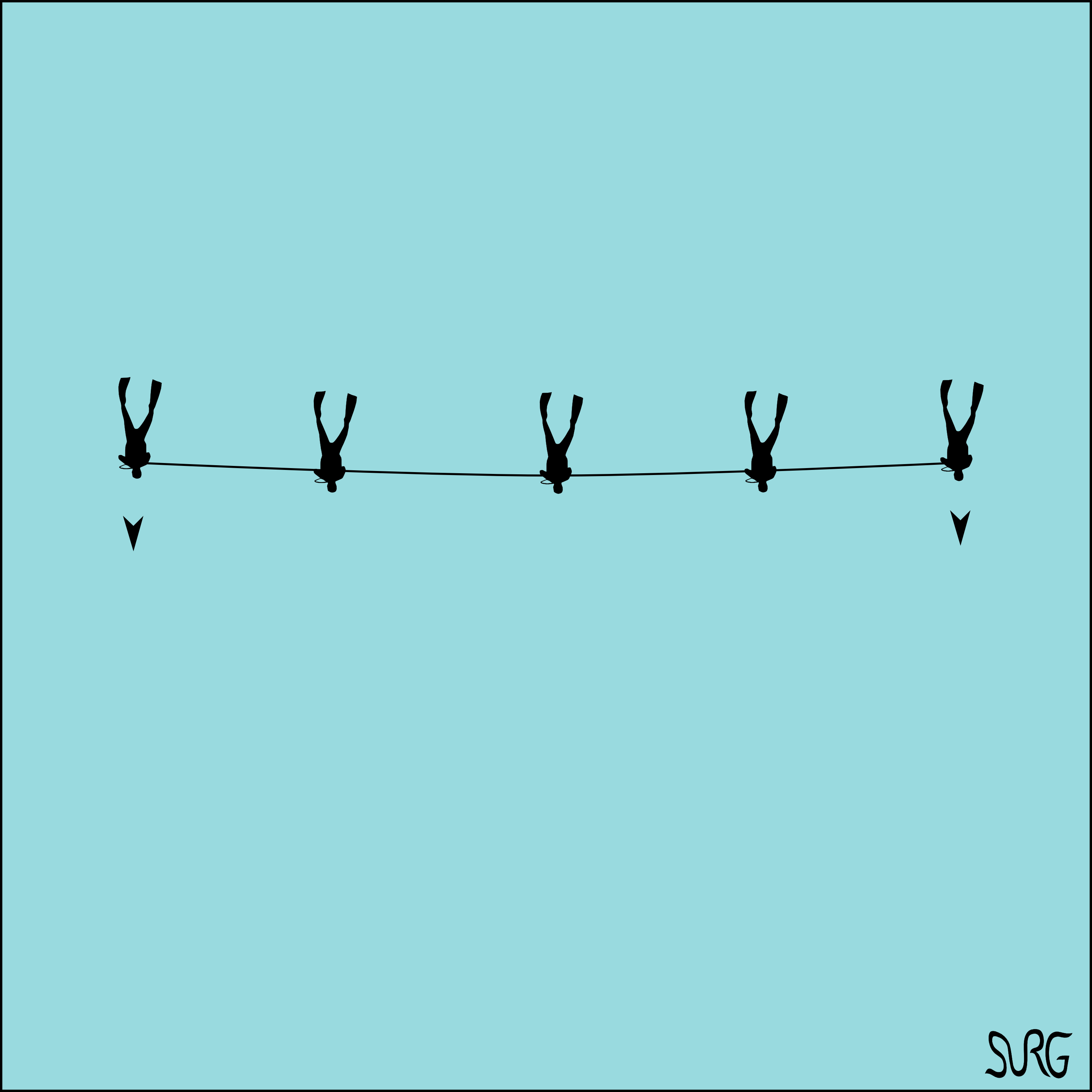
Swimline search pattern

This is the visual equivalent of the snag-line search. A team of divers spreads out along a length of rope at spacing suited to the visibility, terrain and size of the target. The team leader may theoretically be anywhere on the rope, but is usually at one end or in the middle. He swims on a constant heading which is known to all the divers, who swim on the same heading. Each diver must ensure that he does not get ahead of or lag behind the diver to his side who is closer to the leader, and that the rope is kept taut. In this way an evenly spaced line of divers swims a straight sweep with a width equal to the length of the swim line. It can work but requires concentration and a bit of practice, as all the divers are also supposed to be diligently searching for the target. The swim line method can also be applied to a circular pattern, but this is inefficient and usually badly co-ordinated as the direction is constantly changing. A variation on this pattern that can work is in a river or canal where the ends are controlled by line tenders on the banks, who can communicate and can sweep the line round curves. Complications arise with variations in width but most of these can be dealt with by planning ahead. Line signals can instruct the divers to adjust their spacing to suit conditions.

=== Searches directed from the surface ===
==== Directed from the surface ====
A diver who is in communication with the surface by line signals or by voice communication may be directed to and around a search area from the surface. This has a relatively limited scope, but can work in some cases, particularly when the surface team has a real time sonar picture of the target and the diver in bad visibility. This may be considered not to be a search, as the target can be seen, and the position known, but it is not always possible to get a positive identification until the diver gets there, and there may be several potential targets to check. The technique is also sometimes used when the approximate position can be judged from the surface, but the diver still needs to do some searching once in the desired position.

==== Towed searches ====
One or two divers can be towed behind a boat at speeds up to 3.5 or 4 km per hour to do visual searches. They steer and control their depth by using a tow board, which may be equipped with a safety quick disconnect mechanism and drop-floats to mark targets.

Suitable for searching large area in good visibility for a large target. The diver must be careful not to ascend too quickly. When a target is seen the diver will disconnect the board and send up a marker buoy, which will indicate the position of the target and the diver, allowing the boat to approach with caution while the diver ascends. The search pattern is controlled by the skipper of the boat, and may follow a GPS defined route. If the visibility is good enough or the water shallow, the divers can search while towed at the surface.

=== Searches using special equipment ===
==== Hand held sonar transponders ====
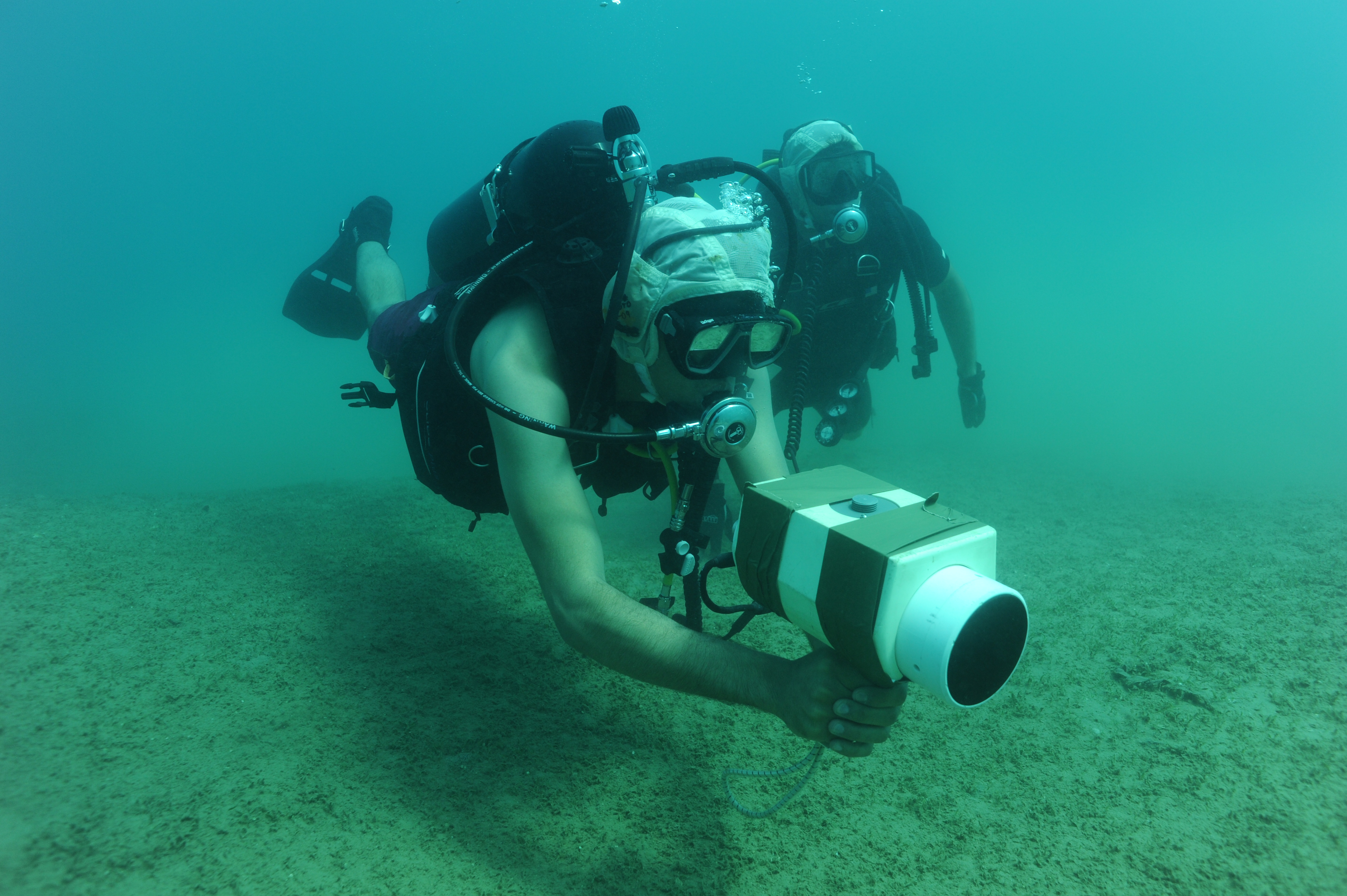
US Navy diver training in the use of a hand held sonar device

Divers can use sonar units. They use be active sonar (transponders that emit a signal and measure the return signal strength to determine obstructions in a given direction) or passive (transponders which measure a signal emitted by the target).

A signal transmitter attached to the target instrumentation package is often used to allow scientists to recover instrumentation relatively quickly, where the position can not be marked at the surface by a buoy. The diver carries a receiver which is tuned to the frequency of the transmitter and is usually capable of indicating signal strength and the direction, allowing the diver to proceed towards it on a fairly direct route. The transmitter may be triggered by a coded sonar signal from the surface or by a timer.

Inertial navigation instruments which can be used to give a precise position to the diver can be used to follow a planned search pattern in much the same way that a compass is used, but are better in currents, as they give an absolute position and directions.

=== Other search patterns ===
==== Current drift search ====
Divers are spaced out across the direction of current flow and search as they are carried over the bottom by the current. They would usually be monitored from the surface using marker buoys so that the effectiveness of coverage can be assessed, and the search is likely to be most effective in good visibility and in areas where the current velocity is reasonably consistent. This is very similar in effect to the swimline visual search, and the techniques can be combined.

==== Depth contour search ====
Steeply sloping bottoms can sometimes be effectively searched by divers swimming at constant depth, following the contours of the bottom. Depth control may be by gauge, but is very effectively managed by towing a surface marker buoy with the line length set to the desired depth, provided that the surface is not too rough.

=== Communication ===
Most public safety divers and many recreational divers communicate by line signals while conducting searches underwater on scuba. Some jurisdictions may require public safety divers to use voice communications, which may be through water or wired systems. Surface supplied divers communicate with the surface support team by wired telephony.

== Deep water and large areas ==
It is only since the second half of the twentieth century that technology has been developed capable of locating small objects on the seafloor and allowing recovery of objects from far deeper than divers can work. The development of towed side-scan sonar and similar technology has improved the probability of successful deep searches. Dragging with grapnels, searches by divers, and searches using low-resolution sonar were previously the tools available for ocean search. Such searches were difficult, limited in depth and had a very low probability of success.

Underwater search is a basic aspect of deep water salvage operations, as before an object can be recovered, it must first be found, inspected and identified, and the position recorded so that it can be returned to when necessary. Deep water searches are often complex and difficult, and good planning and preparation, and precise execution of the plan increase the chances of success.

The main factors to be considered when planning a search system are:

- whether there are acoustic pingers, transponders or other location aids.
- datum quality – the accuracy and reliability of the existing position information,
- target characteristics (size, material and breakup characteristics),
- water depth and other characteristics,
- seafloor type and topography,
- prevailing weather conditions,
- geographical location,
- equipment availability.

=== Search sensors ===
Sound penetrates well through water compared to light and most other electromagnetic radiations, so sensors using active sound signals have relatively good range, but as the resolution depends on frequency, sonar has limited resolution for longer range work. Passive sound detection has a much longer range, but at best can determine approximate direction of the source. Light penetration is far less than sound, and is limited by turbidity and absorption, with blue-green frequencies being least affected by absorption in clean water, and giving high resolution but very limited range. Magnetic field variations are not limited by penetration but have extremely low resolution and weak field strength, and sensors are limited to detecting the presence of a magnetic anomaly.

==== Echo sounders ====
Single and multi-beam echo sounders are a type of sonar that can measure the bottom profile along the track of the ship. It is usual for single beam echo sounders to be permanently installed on a ship with the transducer arrays mounted through the hull. Multi-beam systems may be permanent or portable and mounted over the side or towed. Resolution depends on frequency and height above the bottom, depth range depends to some extent on frequency, and accuracy depends on the accuracy of positional data for the transducers. Sonar searches generally rely on expert human interpretation of a computer generated image of the bottom topography to detect and identify a target.

==== Side-scan sonar ====
Side-scan sonar uses acoustic transducers towed underwater to produce a plan view image of the seafloor showing details of the topography and artifacts to the sides of the track. The swath of seafloor covered in a single pass by side-scan sonar is relatively wide and therefore it is a relatively efficient search system with a high confidence for detecting and identifying a target, and is considered one of the most effective tools for underwater search.

The effective resolution of side-scan sonar depends largely on the operating frequency; the higher the frequency, the greater the resolution, but swath width coverage is inversely related to frequency, so that the higher the frequency, the smaller the area of seafloor covered in a single pass.

==== Pinger locators ====
Pinger-locators are a class of passive acoustic search systems that do not produce any sound - they only detect sound within a specific frequency range. They are useful for finding artifacts that have been equipped with an acoustic beacon (pinger) to aid in location, such as cockpit voice recorders and flight data recorders used by nearly all military and commercial aircraft, which have a 37 kHz acoustic pinger to help locate them in case of a crash at sea.

Pinger-locators that use an omnidirectional hydrophone have a maximum detection range of about one nautical mile (1,850 meters). The omnidirectional hydrophone cannot give bearing information, so several passes must be made over the pinger to pinpoint its position. A pinger-locator that uses a tuned array with a narrow directional hydrophone can give directional information and has increased detection range of up to about two nautical miles. Towed pinger-locators (TPLS) are towed through the search area much like a side-scan sonar, but at a higher speed. Because of their long range, they tend to be effective at locating the target in a shorter time. Pinger-locators designed for hand-held operations from the surface or by divers, have a shorter range.

==== Magnetometers ====
Magnetometers are only sensitive to electromagnetic fields that differ from the local geomagnetic field. In most applications relating to salvage this is a fairly large mass of steel or iron. They have a relatively limited detection range, as the target is not usually strongly magnetised, and can also pick up volcanic rock if present in large amounts.

The magnetic signal strength of an object is inversely proportional to the cube of the distance between the sensor and the object, so magnetometers are not often used as the primary sensor for deep ocean searches, but they can be useful as a secondary sensor to a side-scan sonar search, particularly in situations where the target is lost within an environment rich in false targets, such as a field of rocks, and the sonar return from the target is not easily distinguished from those of the rocks. By correlating positive signals from both the side-scan sonar and a magnetometer sensor towed in tandem, the probability of detection of the object can be significantly improved. A magnetometer is also one of the few instruments capable of locating an object that is buried deeply in bottom sediments.

==== Optical imaging systems ====
Optical imaging systems have been successfully used in deep ocean searches, either independently or in combination with a side-scan sonar. The obvious advantage of an optical imaging system is that the image produced can result in identification of the target without the need for time-consuming contact classification. The actual sensing devices used in optical imaging include still photographic cameras, real-time video cameras, and laser-imaging systems, using lidar technology. Still and video cameras rely on conventional strobe or floodlights as their illumination source. Due to limitations imposed by attenuation of the light and backscattering, still and video sensors need to be within 10 to 20 meters of a target to identify it. A laser-imaging system utilizes a blue/green laser as the illumination source to minimize attenuation and backscattering problems and can image targets as far as 50 meters away. The disadvantages of these systems are a result of high sensitivity to turbidity and underwater visibility, and include a relatively very narrow swath width and range compared to sonar, which results in relatively low towfish altitudes, and low overall search rate.

=== Other search tools ===
The data produced by search sensors is not very useful in isolation. The exact position and orientation of the transducer at the time of acquisition is necessary to reference the three dimensional geographical position of the contacts found, so they can be analysed and where possible, identified, as either the target of the search or false positives, and so that it is possible to return to any contact for further investigation or recovery efforts.

==== Navigation systems ====
Accurate and repeatable navigation is an essential requirement for deep ocean search operations. The basic requirements are the ability to steer the vessel on the planned search pattern, to precisely track the position of the sensors on the search vessel or towfish, and to return to any position at a later time. Positions logged by the search sensors are relative to the position and orientation of the sensors at the time, so the accuracy of the data depends on the accuracy of the navigation system, though data post-processing for differential GPS corrections is possible if DGPS is not available in real-time.

==== Loss data analysis ====
Loss data analysis is the process of defining the search area and most probable target location by the acquisition and analysis of all available information related to the loss of an object. This task is the start of the planning process and will usually influence the other planning activities, such as equipment selection and search pattern design. The first step is to compile all of the information available from the actual scene of the loss. This may require a first-hand visit to the scene by the search specialist to interview eyewitnesses as soon as possible, because it is well known that information degrades with time. The following information is usually important:

- Times of the loss and other related events.
- Eyewitness and survivor accounts describing the loss.
- Position of the loss or last contact with the object
- Position of floating debris.
- Position of survivor rescues.
- Weather conditions at the time of loss
- Water conditions at the time of loss

All information, and its sources, should be analyzed for probable accuracy. It is typical that some data will be contradictory and a judgement will have to be made regarding the probability of accuracy of each. The search area box around the most probable seafloor position must account for the cumulative error or the uncertainty inherent in the deduced position. The confidence level that the target lies within the search box should be high before the actual search commences.

Search probability analysis

Search probability analysis takes the loss data analysis further by determining the most probable target location. The search area box is partitioned into smaller areas called cells, each of which is assigned its own calculated probability of the target being in that cell. A map of these cells will indicate where the search should be concentrated to improve the chance of early location of the target in a large search area.

=== Deep water search patterns ===
The quality of a search pattern is measured by how thoroughly and efficiently the search area is examined. Systematic examination of the search area is achieved by following a planned pattern that is adapted to the particular conditions of the search.

There are search patterns which have been found to be both effective and practical for deep ocean searches. An important general rule for side-scan sonar searches, regardless of what search pattern is used, is to orient the long dimension of the search area so that it is approximately parallel with the depth contours, which minimizes the need to make changes of the towfish altitude to maintain a reasonably consistent altitude (height above the bottom) and swath width, which results in more consistent sonar performance and a lower risk of omitted areas and excessive swath overlap. Signal degradation may occur on the down-slope side when running along contours, but is preferable to poor returns from the towfish as it is hauled up and down. Track spacing can be adapted to compensate.

==== Parallel grid search ====
The most commonly used search pattern for a towed sensor search is a rectangular grid with straight-line search tracks parallel to each other. Adjacent search tracks are spaced close enough to allow the sonar coverage to overlap by enough to compensate for ship track and sonar tow path variations, and also compensate for the inherent loss in the sonar return and resolution at the outer edges and caused by depth variations.

The ship must reverse heading and steady its course with the towfish aligned and at the correct depth at the end of each line and before re-entering the search area. A towfish will tend to change depth with a change in speed, and care must be taken that it does not hit the bottom during the turns. A straight run of several kilometers may be needed to get the towfish properly realigned in deep water work, so the time required for turns may exceed the time actually searching.

==== Constant range search ====
Constant range searches are used if the vessel's navigation system does not have a capability for navigating along straight lines. This pattern uses search lines that are a constant distantce from a fixed reference point. When used for a side-scan sonar search, the range from the central point of the curves must be great enough to give a reasonably straight-line segment, as tracks that are not straight will degrade the side-scan sonar imagery and make interpretation much more difficult. With ubiquitous global navigation satellite systems this method is mostly of historical interest.

==== "Z" search ====
"Z" search patterns are used specifically for the location of an undersea pipeline or cable, and can be very efficient in that they essentially cover the entire search area with slightly less detection probability than a parallel grid search, but without the need for 100-percent coverage and the typical overlap. The "Z" search makes use of the linear nature of pipelines and cables by ensuring that the towed sensor will cross the object several times at a reasonable angle for detection. If the object is detected with high confidence on the first few passes, the pattern can be modified such that the track lines will be shortened to just span the object and eventually follow it continuously within sensor range. The primary disadvantages of a "Z" search are that the object’s orientation must be known beforehand and that the actual moment of detection is short and can be missed. For this reason, it is recommended that both a side-scan sonar and magnetometer be used in tandem.

==== Search coverage ====
Search coverage is the area of seafloor effectively inspected by the sensors. Its area is the sensor effective swath width and the distance traveled by the search vessel on its track. It also relates to the repeat coverage of an area - one pass equals 100-percent coverage of an area and two passes over the same area equals 200 percent for that area. The quality of a search depends in part on how well the search area is examined. Occasionally a cursory search may find an object, but a thorough search should always be planned and the search area covered completely.

Swath width is the lateral coverage of the seafloor by the search sensor perpendicular to the track. It is based on the detection range for the target for the expected bottom terrain. Resolution of the sensor is inversely related to Swath width, particularly for side-scan sonar - the greater the swath width the lower the resolution. Swath width is also a function of sensor height and bottom slope, and will vary depending on bottom profile.

Lane spacing is the distance between two adjacent tracks in a grid search. The lane spacing must be less than the swath width of the sensor to allow for enough range overlap to assure complete coverage of the search area. The spacing between tracks along with the swath width determines the degree of coverage of the search area and ultimately the quality of the search. As lane spacing is decreased, the coverage and search quality increases because a greater percentage of seafloor is examined in two separate sensor passes. Closer lane spacing gives more thorough coverage, but increases the search time because more passes must be made through a given search area.

Range overlap is the area of seafloor that is examined twice on successive passes. It provides a margin of safety to mitigate ship track and sensor tow path variations and compensates for the inherent loss in the sonar signal quality at the outer ranges. The amount of range overlap required should be estimated before starting the search. A common range overlap for side-scan sonar is 50%, which is produced by using a lane spacing that of 50% of the swath width. The entire area of seafloor between the two outer tracks of the search box should be scanned twice in this scenario.

Search time is the time expended on the search, and is estimated during the planning. Only a rough approximation is possible, as the target may be found almost immediately, not at all, or after an intermediate duration affected by unforeseen circumstances. The basic information used for the calculation is the size of the area to be searched, the lane spacing to be used during the search, the approximate speed of the search vessel and an estimate of the end-of-line turn time, taking into account the water depth.

Contact classification is the process in which contacts from sensors are analyzed. Classification is a process of interpretation which depends on the distinctive characteristics target as the reference against which contacts are compared. It may be possible to identify a contact to be the lost object without the need for in-depth analysis, but in complex searches that involve many objects and numerous false contacts, the classification process can take days or weeks. Quantitative analysis that can be performed on side-scan and multibeam sonar contacts includes measuring the intensity of sonar signal returned by the contact, measuring the horizontal dimensions of the tar- get and the height of the contact off the seafloor. Precise position data of the contacts can also be useful in the interpretation of data. Qualitative analysis of a contact is the interpretation by the search specialist based on experience. The product of this analysis is a list of contacts ranked in priority for subsequent observation and identification.

== Search platforms ==
Surface vessels can search with sensors mounted on the vessel or with towed transducers. Crewed submersibles, ROVs and AUVs can search using optical, sonar and magnetometer detection equipment.

=== Surface vessels ===
Surface vessels can search underwater using sonar and magnetometer detection equipment. Sometimes an optical search is also possible. Sensors and sensor arrays can be mounted on surface vessels, either in a fixed mounting, or on a mounting that is deployed when in use, and may be portable between vessels allowing convenient and economical use from vessels of opportunity. Some types of sensor, such as side-scan sonar and magnetometers are most useful if deployed fairly close to the bottom, so it is common to deploy them as towed array sonar systems on towfish, towed behind a surface vessel, with the display and recording equipment on the towing vessel.

A towed array sonar is a system of hydrophones towed behind a ship by a cable. Trailing the hydrophones behind the vessel, on a cable that can be kilometers long, keeps the array's sensors away from the ship's own noise sources, greatly improving its signal-to-noise ratio, and hence the effectiveness of detecting and tracking faint contacts, such as quiet, low noise-emitting submarine threats, or seismic signals.

A towed array offers superior resolution and range compared with hull mounted sonar. It also covers the baffles, the blind spot of hull mounted sonar. However, effective use of the system limits a vessel's speed and care must be taken to protect the cable and array from damage.

Side-scan sonar imagery can be useful to identify objects which stand out from the surrounding topography. It is particularly useful in deep water and on smooth bottoms where the target is easily distinguished. It is less effective in areas where the target may be heavily encrusted with marine growth or otherwise hidden in the complexities of the bottom topography. Sonar produces a picture of the bottom by plotting the image derived from the time between emission of a sound signal from the transducer and the reception of an echo from a given direction. Resolution decreases with distance from the transducer, but at moderate range the form of a human body can be recognisable, making this a useful method for search and recovery operations. A transducer array mounted in a streamlined housing (known as the "fish" or "towfish") can be towed behind a vessel at a desired depth to provide suitable resolution. The image is recorded and the position of the fish relative to the vessel correlated with positional input from the vessel, usually from GPS. A search pattern which covers the whole search area with consistent relative position between transducer and tow vessel is most effective. Once a target has been found it is usually investigated further by a diver or ROV for positive identification and whatever other action is appropriate.

A magnetometer basically measures the magnetic field of the surroundings, and can detect very small local variations which may indicate the presence of magnetic materials. When a magnetometer is towed behind a vessel at a distance where the magnetic field of the towing vehicle does not overwhelm the signal, it can be a sensitive indicator of variations due to geological deposits or artifacts. The signal is correlated to position input, usually from GPS, to indicate local magnetic anomalies which may be worth further investigation by diver or ROV. Towed magnetometer searches are useful for finding artifacts such as shipwrecks and aircraft wrecks, and can also be useful for confirming detection of pipelines and cables when towed in series with a side-scan sonar.

=== Crewed submersibles ===
Crewed submersibles often have search sensors mounted as part of their basic outfit, as searches are a common task, and the same sensors are often also used for underwater navigation.

=== Remotely operated underwater vehicles ===
An ROV can be used as a platform for sensors which can maneuver the sensors in proximity to objects of interest on the bottom. Its value as a search tool depends on how effectively and efficiently it can be used to cover a search area compared to towed or surface vessel mounted systems. An ROV is limited to operating in small areas because of the restriction of the umbilical on maneuverability and range, but it can be very effective in searching a debris field for specific items. Onboard acoustic and optical sensors can be used to locate and identify objects, and manipulators may be useful for recovering objects within its carrying capacity.

An ROV box search is unique to ROV operations. The intention is that the ROV will completely search a square area of seafloor and then move on to search an adjacent square area of the same dimensions. Through successive searching of adjacent boxes arranged in a grid, the ROV can systematically cover a search area with reasonable expectations of full coverage. ROV box searches are designed around the effective range of the ROV's scanning sonar and the scope of free movement available to the ROV by way of its tether. The search begins by deploying the ROV in the center of the box while the support ship keeps station over the box center. Guided by the sonar contacts it picks up, the ROV follows radial lines from the center of the box to locate and visually inspect each contact.

=== Autonomous underwater vehicles ===
An autonomous underwater vehicle (AUV) is a robotic submersible that travels underwater without requiring continuous input from an operator. AUVs constitute part of a larger group of undersea systems known as unmanned underwater vehicles, a classification that includes non-autonomous remotely operated underwater vehicles (ROVs) – controlled and powered from the surface by an operator/pilot via an umbilical or using remote control.

For example, the US Navy's Advanced Unmanned Search System (AUSS) was capable of deep ocean, large area side-scan sonar search and detailed optical inspection, after which it could resume the search where it left off. It used Doppler sonar and a gyrocompass to navigate, and could operate to 6,000 metres (20,000 ft) depth.

The AUSS used several sensor systems for deep water search and inspection. These included the acoustic link, Doppler sonar, scanning sonar and optical sensors, and computers and software for data processing. AUSS could do broad area searches and immediate target evaluation interchangeably, and could provide near-real-time high-resolution sonar data at speeds up to five knots. The vehicle could be instructed to take still images from specific locations, or to provide a photo-mosaic of a specified size, orientation, and location. The vehicle could do a purely optical search or use scanning sonar as the primary search sensor. These capabilities allowed a wide and versatile range of search strategies.

=== Aircraft ===
Crewed aircraft and drones can be used for visual and lidar searches in good visibility and shallow water, and for magnetometer searches.

Active and passive sonobuoys may be used to search for and locate the position of a submerged submarine.

They may be anchored in shallow water, or free-floating in deep water. and may be part of a long term early-warning system, or actively used to hunt down enemy vessels. The position of the target is identified by analysing the time difference of the same sound signals either emitted or reflected from the target and received by three or more buoys. The buoys may be deployed by conventional aircraft or helicopter, or by ships.

Air searches can be done for magnetic targets using magnetic anomaly detection (MAD) systems, which use a sensitive magnetometer carried by an aircraft. These can be done for static targets following search patterns similar to those used by surface craft, or for moving targets such as submarines by search patterns optimised to improve the probability of identifying the position of a moving target. MAD detection of submarines is used to track down the current position of a submarine known to be in the area for purposes of identification, confirmation of suspected presence, tracking of movements and launching of weaponry.

== From the shore ==
Draglines have been used from the shore to locate suitable targets. Lines with hooks or grapnels may be thrown or carried out from the shore and then pulled in with the hope of snagging the target, Once snagged, the procedure depends on whether the target is likely to be pulled out, or must be inspected in situ.

Cadaver dogs are used by law enforcement and public safety agencies to detect missing bodies underwater. This is most effective in shallow and confined water without much current. The dogs can also be transported over the water in boats to expand the search area or attempt to provide more precise location. The dogs are most effective when they can get right down to the water surface to smell and taste it, which requires a boat with low freeboard. Dog searches for underwater cadavers is complicated by the movement of water and wind, which move the smell away from the source.

== See also ==
- Diver rescue – Rescue of a distressed or incapacitated diver
- Emergency management – Dealing with all humanitarian aspects of emergencies
- Frisking, also known as body search – Act of searching a person's outer clothing to detect concealed objects
- Marine salvage – Recovering a ship or cargo after a maritime casualty
- Police diving – Branch of professional diving carried out by police services
- Search and rescue – Search for and provision of aid to people who are in distress or imminent danger
  - Air-sea rescue – Coordinated search and rescue of survivors at sea
  - Combat search and rescue – Military personnel recovery from battlefield and enemy occupied areas
  - Surface water rescue – Rescue of a person who is at the surface of a body of water
  - Surface water searches – Procedures to find objects or persons lost at the surface of a body of water
  - Technical rescue – Use of specialised tools and skills for rescue
  - Wilderness search and rescue – Techniques applicable to wild areas
- Search and seizure – Police powers
- Underwater search and recovery – Locating and recovering underwater objects
