= Searcher =

Searcher or Searchers may refer to:

- HMS Searcher, a list of ships
  - HMS Searcher (D40), a British escort carrier
- HMC Searcher a customs cutter of the UK
- USS Searcher (AGR-4), a United States radar picket ship
- IAI Searcher, a type of unmanned aerial vehicle
- Searchers (search engine), an internet search engine
- Searchers (film), 2016 Canadian film
- "The Searcher", a segment on the television show Danger Theatre
- Searcher of the dead, a person employed in late medieval London to investigate the cause of death
- Calosoma, a genus of beetles
- Bathymaster signatus, a fish
- A magazine published by Information Today, Inc. that merged with Online in 2013 to become Online Searcher
- Searchers, or Ichneutae, a satyr play by Sophocles
- Searchers, enemies from the video game Bendy and the Ink Machine

== See also ==
- The Searchers (disambiguation)
- Searchers 2.0
- A Searchers EP
- Search (disambiguation)
