= Underwater search and recovery =

Locating and recovering underwater objects

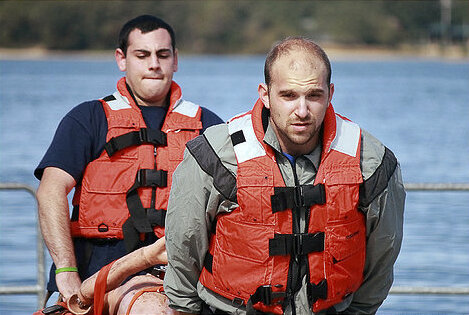
Public safety diving team members bring in a casualty

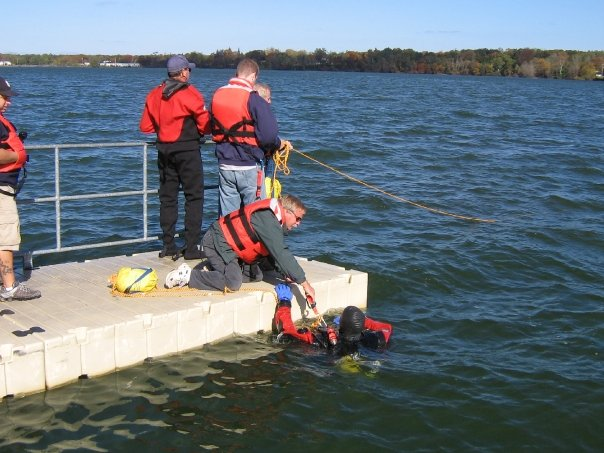
Controlling an underwater search from the jetty

Underwater search and recovery is the process of locating and recovering underwater objects, often by divers, but also by the use of submersibles, remotely operated vehicles and electronic equipment on surface vessels.

Most underwater search and recovery is done by professional divers as part of commercial marine salvage operations, military operations, emergency services, or law enforcement activities.

Minor aspects of search and recovery are also considered within the scope of recreational diving.

== Professional search and recovery ==
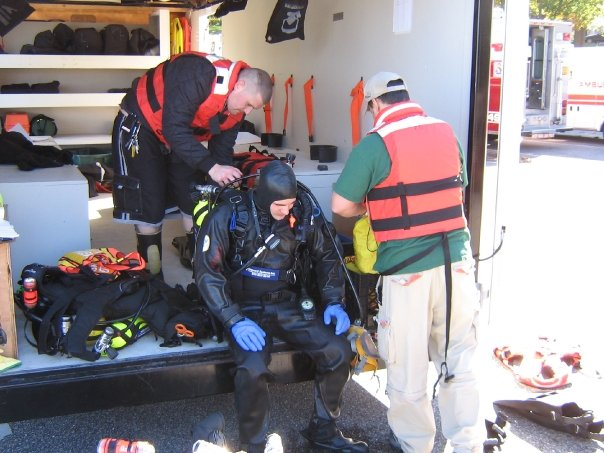
Preparing a public safety diver for the water

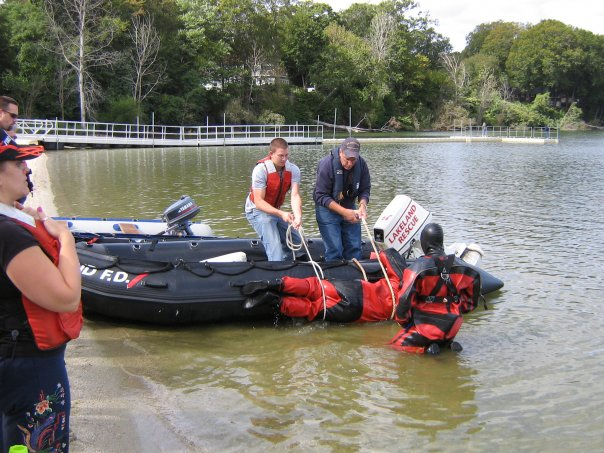
Parbuckling a casualty onto the boat

The scope of professional search and recovery includes the following applications:

- Marine archeology - search for artifacts of historical interest and importance, and where applicable the recovery of such artifacts for study.
- Marine salvage - search for lost material of value and recovery thereof
- Environmental protection - search for environmentally undesirable material and disposal thereof
- Forensic S&R - search for and recovery of material relevant to police investigations
- Emergency S&R - Search for and recovery of victims of accidents and disasters
- Military S&R - Search and recovery related to military operations and material
- Scientific S&R - search for objects of scientific interest, recovery of instrumentation and samples

== Recreational search and recovery ==
Search and recovery diving is also frequently undertaken as part of recreational diving, and most diver training organisations have dedicated training courses on the subject. Search and recovery is generally considered a more hazardous speciality diving course. (Note: For example, PADI regards search and recovery as one of only three speciality which require the student to already be certified as an Advanced Open Water Diver before commencing (the other two being ice diving and cave diving, both of which are considered highly hazardous).)

Underwater search and recovery used to form a mandatory component of the Advanced Open Water Diver training course for many North American diver training agencies, (Note: For example, it was a mandatory part of the PADI Advanced Open Water Diver course until 1989) which, in addition to learning basic search and recover skills, also assisted in teaching students to cope with task loading.

Although the scale, value and equipment used in commercial and recreational search and recovery are enormously different, the basic premise remains the same in each case.

== Search ==
=== Diver search ===
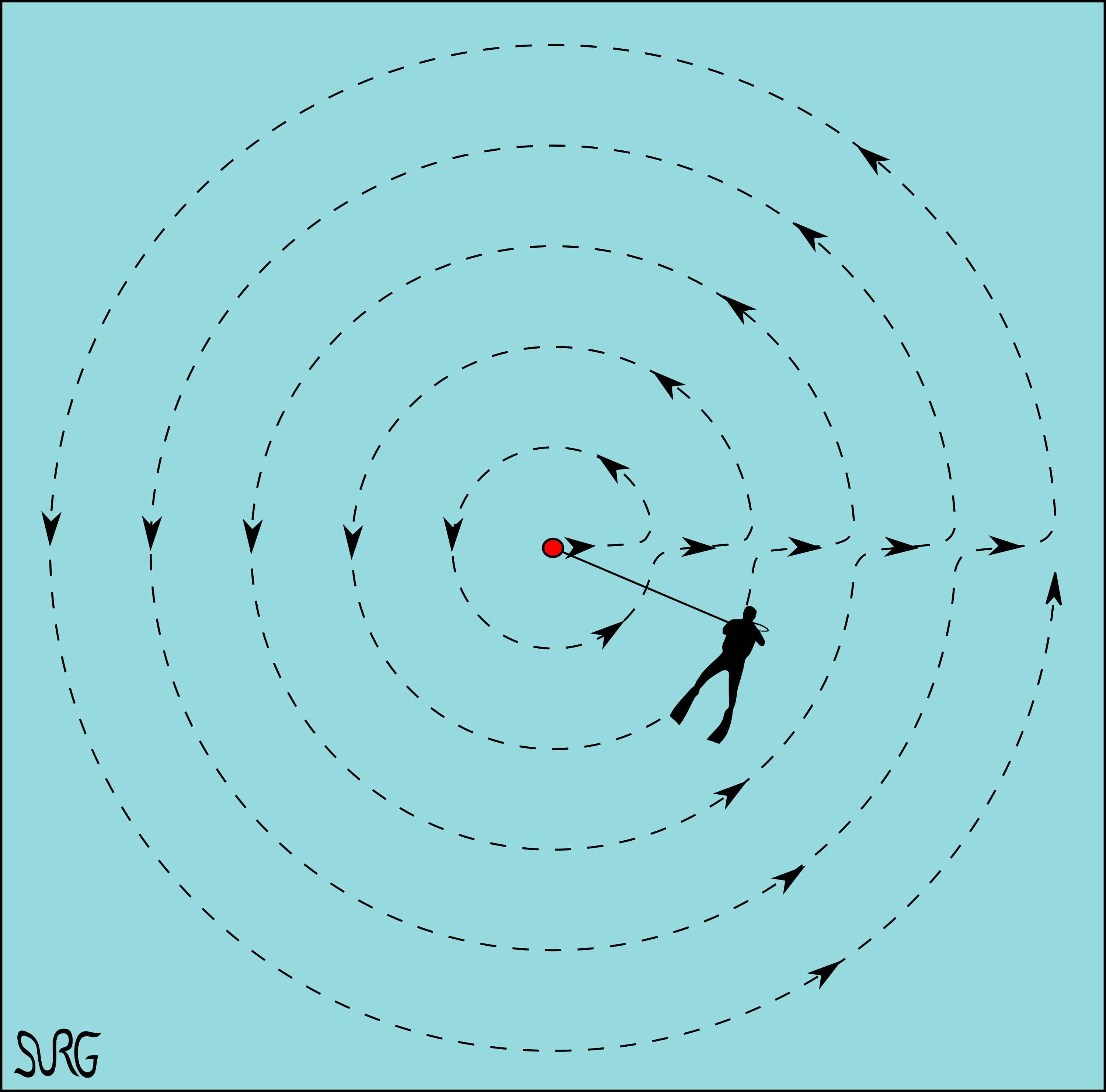
The highly versatile standard circular search pattern

Underwater searches, much like above water searches, are designed around specific search patterns. The most common forms of underwater search patterns are:

- Circular search
- Jackstay search
- Expanding square search
- Ladder pattern search

The patterns are usually performed by divers in pairs or teams below the water, but they can also be conducted by use of a tender who may be a snorkeller at the surface, a person on a towing boat, or a person located on the shore.

In simple search operations, the patterns will usually be conducted by the divers simply looking visually for the object. In more sophisticated search operations, underwater magnetometers or hand held sonar may be used.

==== Types ====
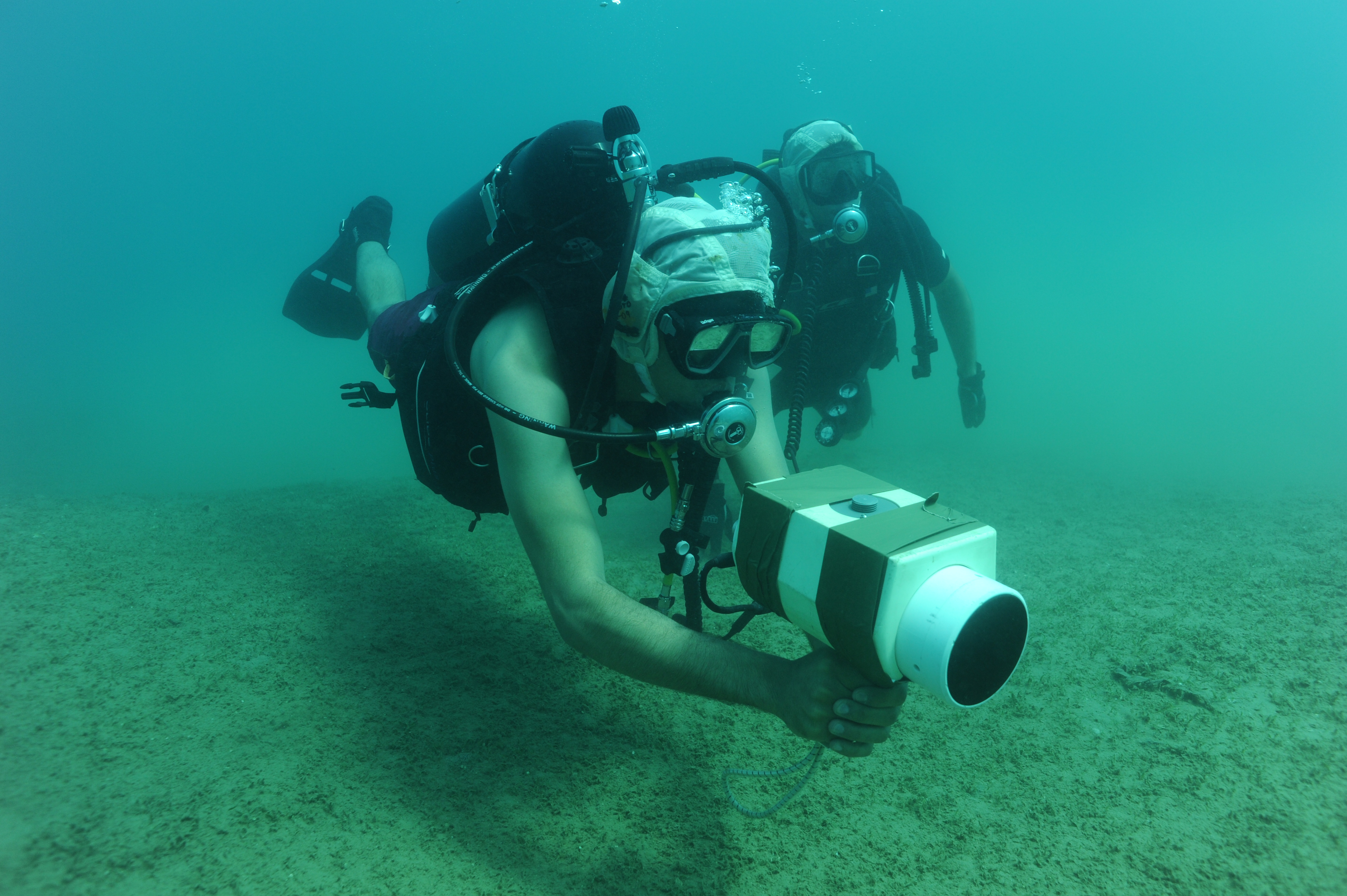
Underwater search aids include hand held sonar devices

Diver training traditionally divides searches into two categories, specific and non-specific.

A specific search is an attempt to locate a known object in a known area where it was believed to be lost even if the time period is undefined, and the search terminates upon the location of the object. The classic example of this would be an item lost overboard from a boat, which needs to be recovered.

A non-specific search is a search for either a type of object or anything valuable within the dive locale. The discovery of a relevant object does not usually terminate the search until the entire search area has been covered, or the search terminates early for other reasons (air supply, no decompression limits, etc.).

=== ROV searches ===
ROVs are connected to a ship using a series of cables. The cables transmit signals between the ROV's operator and the ROV, allowing for the ROV to be controlled remotely. ROVs can include numerous things, including video cameras, lights, sonar systems, and articulating arms. Articulating arm is used for retrieving small objects, cutting lines, or attaching lifting hooks to larger objects. ROVs can aid crews in searches. Traditional search and rescue methods, which typically involve dive teams, face many challenges, including the safety of dive teams working in dangerous environments, time and depth restrictions, search inaccuracy, deployment requirements, and cost. There are numerous benefits to using ROVs in Search and Recovery, including increased safety for divers, extended dive time, the ability to perform deepwater searches, advanced imaging and sensor capabilities, documentation and evidence preservation, and target recovery.

=== Searches using non-visual methods ===
- A magnetometer is a device that measures magnetic field or magnetic dipole moment. Different types of magnetometers measure the direction, strength, or relative change of a magnetic field at a particular location. Magnetometers can be used as metal detectors: they can detect only magnetic (ferrous) metals, but can detect such metals at a much greater distance than conventional metal detectors which rely on conductivity; they are capable of detecting large ferrous objects over considerable distances.
- Side-scan sonar and multi-beam sonar.
- A dragline is a line which is towed either across the bottom, or at a depth controlled by floats and weights, or hydrodynamically, by paravanes or otter-boards, that is intended to snag the target, indicating its position.
- Cadaver dogs

== Recovery ==
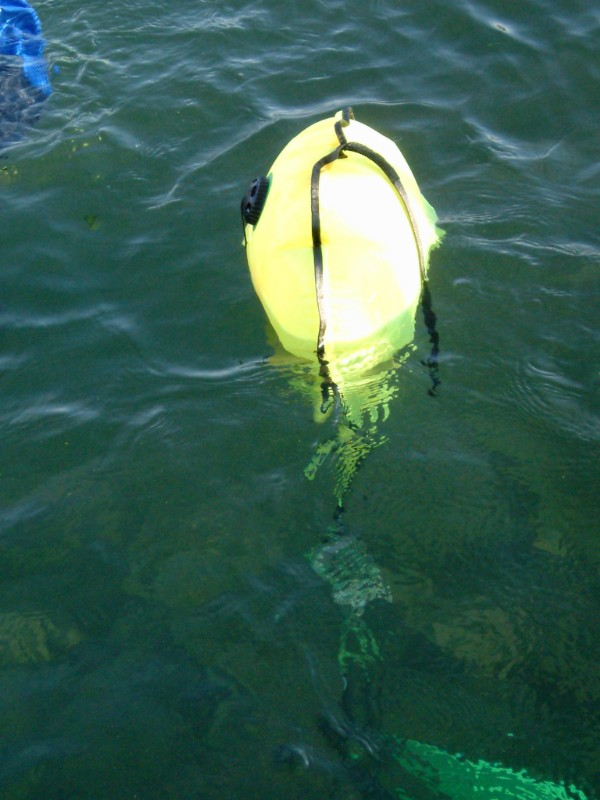
A 20 litre/0.8 cubic foot lifting bag

Recovery techniques depend upon the type and size of the object, and the depth at which it is found.

Smaller objects, such as a coin or camera, can simply be carried up by the diver. Training agencies vary in what they specify to be the maximum apparent weight that can be safely carried up unassisted by a scuba diver, but normally the limit is set around 15 pounds (7 kg), though this will depend on the reserve capacity of the buoyancy compensator, the diver's skill in buoyancy control, and the consequences of a loss of buoyancy control. Anything heavier represents a material change to the diver's buoyancy control, and may put the diver at risk from an uncontrolled ascent if contact with the object is lost during ascent. Professional surface supplied divers working from a bell or stage can carry heavier objects to the stage, but they usually have an option to use a lifting line independent of the diver transport platform. Similarly, small objects can be recovered directly by lifting by an ROV or crewed submersible with manipulator capability.

Medium-sized objects are normally recovered using a lifting bag, and professional divers are trained in lifting bag techniques (it is usually considered specialty training in recreational diving). The most common hazard is entanglement with lines whilst filling the lifting bag from the diver's alternate air source. This risk, when coupled with the possibility of rapid ascent following the freeing of the object from suction caused by it being embedded in the bottom sediment, can seriously compromise the safety of the recovery team if done improperly. Lift bags can be rated up to several tons, but these are beyond the capacity of most recreational divers, and there is no recreational diver training for their use. A cubic metre of air per tonne at ambient hydrostatic pressure is needed. This is not practicable for cylinders carried by the diver (the most common scuba cylinder size has a total capacity of 80 cubic feet (2.3 m^{3}) at surface pressure). Large lifting bags are normally filled from a low-pressure compressed air hose from the surface, which may be attached directly to the lifting bag.

Significantly larger objects usually require specialised industrial lifting equipment, such as a winch attached to a boat or platform, or specialised equipment to seal and dewater sunken vessels.

== Hazards ==
Search hazards are determined by the environment of the search area and type of the search. Recovery hazards are related to the object to be recovered, the local environment through which it is to be moved and the method and equipment to be used. There is a large variety possible for all of these, and while some may not be known beforehand, it is usually possible to make a reasonable estimate based on experience with similar situations.

== Training and certification ==
Search and recovery operations are part of the professional diver's working skill set, and will be included in entry-level training. Public safety divers' occupation and job description is based on underwater search and recovery, and they may learn more techniques than other professional divers.

Search and recovery is a class of underwater work, and is out of scope for general recreational diving. Nevertheless, many recreational divers choose to learn the skills and have access to limited training and equipment through recreational diver training providers, and consequently there is also certification available.

== See also ==
- Underwater searches – Techniques for finding underwater targets
- Diver navigation, also known as Underwater navigation – Underwater navigation by scuba divers
- Marine salvage – Recovering a ship or cargo after a maritime casualty
- Police diving – Branch of professional diving carried out by police services
- Public safety diving – Underwater work done by law enforcement, rescue and search and recovery teams
- Search and rescue – Search for and provision of aid to people who are in distress or imminent danger
- Underwater archaeology – Study of human activity via evidence found underwater
