= Searchers (search engine) =

Searchers

Searchers is an internet search engine launched to the public in February 2005. It is a locally hosted web search engine claiming the largest web index in the United Kingdom. Searchers, named Searchers.com until a branding change in 2008, is owned by Reach Global Ltd. Development on the internet search engine began in 2003 at its headquarters in Church, Lancashire. It was incorporated as Searchers UK Ltd in 2004.

== Objectives ==
Searchers launched to the public in 2005 with the aim of developing a British alternative to US internet search engines serving the UK. Searchers focuses on returning results relevant to UK users and offers the idea of a "pure" search result which is not influenced by keyword manipulation or paid prominence.

== Developments ==
In 2004, Searchers partnered with Yell to offer Yell web links for businesses. By 2005, Searchers was also working with shopping website Kelkoo to offer users the opportunity to search for products based on product name and category.

Other developments have included the showcasing of Diana, an artificial intelligence interface, which offered conversational interaction to its web users.

The seventh version (v7) of the Searchers algorithm was launched in October 2010 and included the basis of the Credibility Score, a "measure of commercial conduct".

== Responses ==
Searchers launched an advertising campaign on the UK terrestrial channel Channel 4 throughout 2006 and targeted potential web users. A follow-up advertising campaign was broadcast on Channel 4 in 2009.

In October 2010, Searchers parent company Reach Global featured on the BBC website and BBC Radio Lancashire as a local company thriving during a time of hefty public sector cuts.

Searchers' potential was discussed in a parliamentary adjournment debate (as Reach Global, its parent company) on 26 January 2011.

The debate, entitled UK Internet Search Engines, was raised by Hyndburn MP Graham Jones and attended by Culture Minister Edward Vaizey. It achieved moderate coverage across a range of print and online news sources, including the Accrington Observer, Tech Watch and The Register.

A related adjournment debate was scheduled on 5 April 2011 by Esher and Walton MP Dominic Raab, entitled Net Neutrality, during which Edward Vaizey confirmed his intention to visit Reach Global and its search engine.
