= The Searchers (disambiguation) =

The Searchers is a 1956 American Western film directed by John Ford.

The Searchers may also refer to:

- The Searchers (band), a Merseybeat music group
- The Searchers, a 1979 album by The Searchers
- The Searchers (TV series), a 2009 Iranian television police drama
- The Searchers, or Ichneutae, a satyr play by Sophocles
- The Searchers, a comic book published by Caliber Comics

== See also ==
- Searcher (disambiguation)
