= Advanced Unmanned Search System =

United States Navy submersible

The Advanced Unmanned Search System (AUSS) was a submersible employed by the United States Navy constructed from a carbon-fiber reinforced plastic cylinder with titanium semi-spheres at the ends. The vessel measured 17 feet (5.2 m) in length, and was 31 inches (79 cm) wide.

It was able to operate at depths of up to 20,000 feet (6,100 m), autonomously and untethered. Commands were send to the craft via sonar modem at a bitrate of 1,200 bits per second (bit/s), and the AUSS sent back data at rate of 4,800 bit/s. The controllers at the surface defined the targets and the search patterns, while the submersible executed the search patterns autonomously, without any realtime inputs.

Its silver-zinc batteries allowed an endurance of 10 hours, while recharging lasted 20 hours. The AUSS navigated with a gyrocompass and Doppler sonar.

== See also ==
- The manned Titan submersible at the center of the deadly 2023 accident was of a similar construction (CFRP cylinder with titanium end caps)

== Sources ==
- "Advanced Unmanned Search System (AUSS)". Federation of American Scientists. 1999-11-25.
