= Water surface searches =

Procedures to find objects or persons lost at the surface of a body of water

Water surface searches are procedures carried out on or over the surface of a body of water with the purpose of finding lost vessels, persons, or floating objects, which may use one or more of a variety of search patterns depending on the target of the search, as the direction and rate of drift vary depending on the characteristics of the target and the water and weather conditions at the time. The effectiveness of a search pattern is also influenced by the characteristics of the search platform. One or more search platforms may be used.

Factors influencing choice of search pattern and search asset:

- Drift speed and direction, which is affected by
  - Type of object
  - Windage and hydrodynamic drag of the target
- Visibility of object
  - Size and colour of object
  - Height above the water of the observers
  - Illumination and atmospheric conditions
  - Water surface conditions
- Confidence of last known position and elapsed time
- Geographical factors

== Datum and last known position ==
A search is greatly facilitated when the last known position of the target is accurately known in time and space. If the time was recent, the weather and water conditions may not have changed much and drift can be estimated with some confidence. Search datum is the estimated position of the target at the time the search starts, which is last known position corrected for drift. Drift estimates are affected by changes in wind and water conditions, driven by the weather, and may vary with location as the target drifts through more and less sheltered areas. The search will usually be started at or near datum. A datum marker buoy is a tool used to mark the movement of the datum during the search and to provide updated estimates for drift speed and direction. A datum marker buoy should be chosen to drift at the same speed as the target to the extent reasonably practicable, and to remain visible and identifiable during the search.

=== Leeway, set and drift ===
Leeway is the downwind component of motion of a floating object due to wind forces, while current will add a component in the direction (set) of the current flow at the speed (drift) of the current at that point. This combination is loosely termed the drift of the floating object. While these quantities can be estimated and measured, several search patterns use a drifting datum marker which is selected to drift at a similar rate to the target of the search, which automatically compensates for these effects after the initial offset has been taken into account.

== Search patterns ==
Search patterns are methods for systematically travelling over the surface of the area of water in which the target is likely to be found, while observers and/or instruments are deployed with the intention of detecting the targets of the search. An effective search pattern is one in which the entire surface can be examined with a good chance of detecting the target if it is present, but without excessive overlap, though some overlap is usually considered advisable to allow for inaccurate estimates of target visibility and sea and atmospheric conditions. Several standardised search patterns are in common use, some of which are more suitable for surface vessels, and others are more suitable for aircraft. Similar search patterns are used for underwater searches. Most water surface search patterns are followed relative to a moving datum, so steering is by compass heading and distance is determined by speed through the water and elapsed time. Speed and direction over the ground will vary according to drift.

=== Shoreline search ===
A shoreline search is usually used when it is considered likely that survivors or debris may have washed ashore, or survivors may have managed to get ashore by their own efforts, and is often used in conjunction with open water search patterns by other vessels nearby, specially along a lee shore. A shallow draft, maneuverable vessel is best suited to this work, which may require tight maneuvers among navigational hazards or debris.

=== Sector search ===
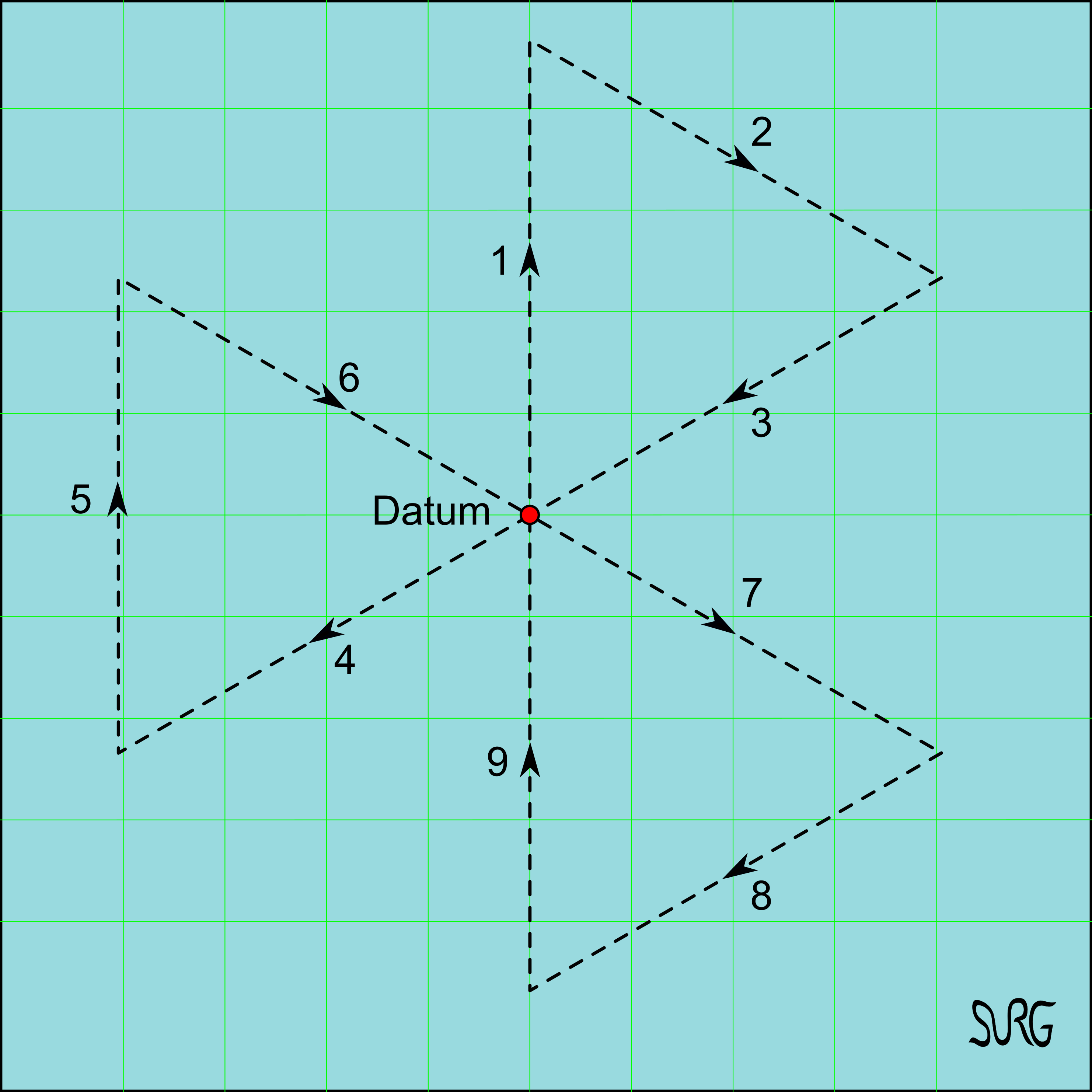
Sector search (Victor Sierra) pattern relative to moving datum drifting with the current

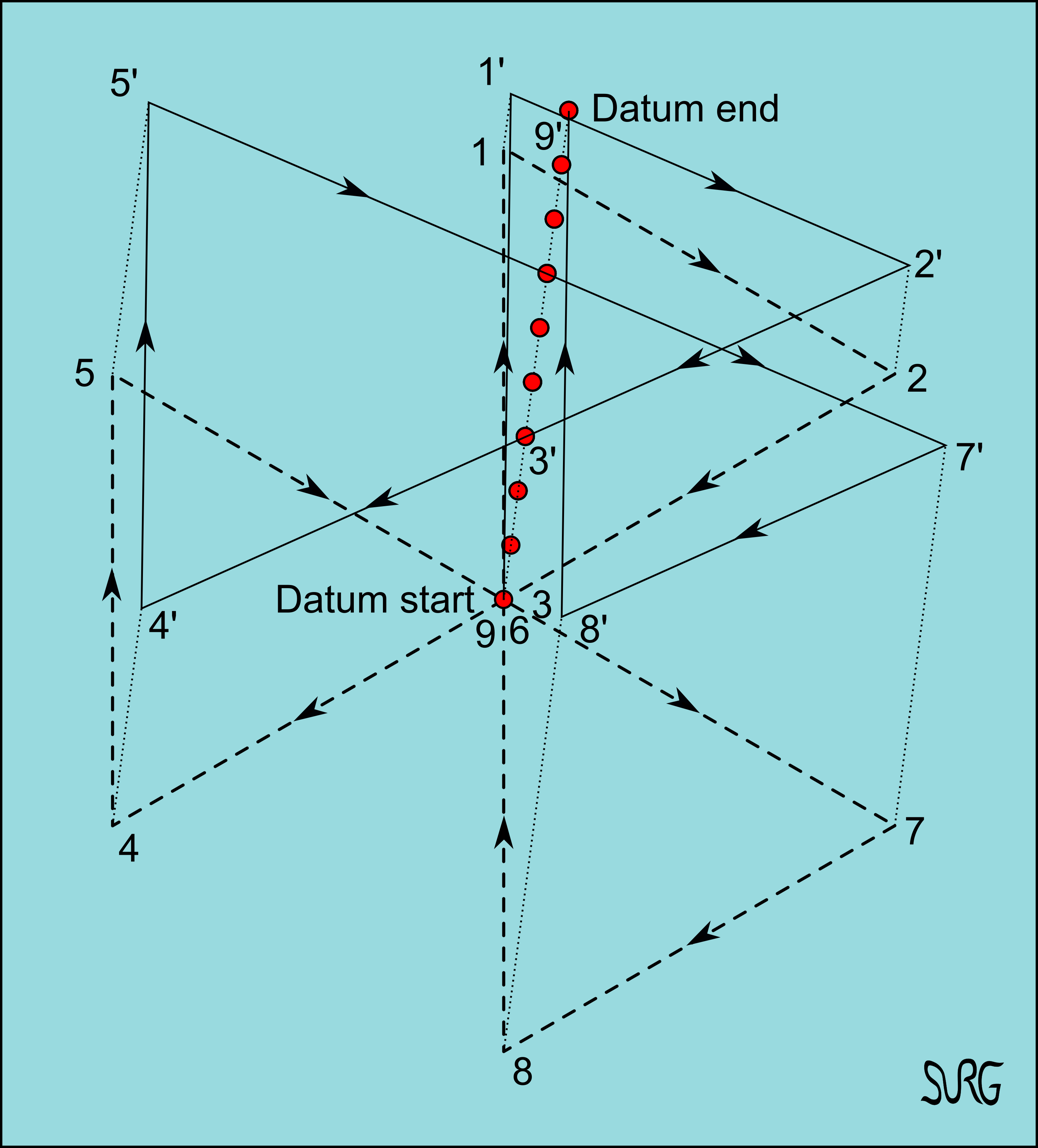
Sector search (Victor Sierra) pattern over ground with drifting datum

A sector search, also known as a Victor Sierra (VS) by the US and Canadian coast guards is a search pattern suitable for a small object in a well defined location that covers a circular area centred on a reported position using a route made up of straight line segments that efficiently covers a circular area, and is adapted to account for drift. First the search vessel makes a measurement of the drift speed and direction, using a datum drift marker to indicate the drift in real time. The pattern is steered relative to the datum marker, and the track over the ground may look considerably different due to superposition of drift. By steering by compass and directly towards the drifting datum every third leg, the search vessel drifts the same amount as the datum, which is the assumed amount of drift for the target. If the initial sector search – often started in approximately drift direction – is unsuccessful, a second sector search can be offset by 30° to either side to give better coverage of the same mass of surface water.

=== Parallel track ===
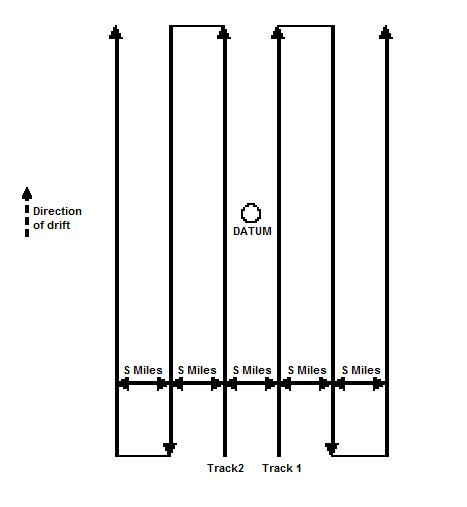
Parallel track search pattern for two vessels

Also known as Papa Sierra (PS), this pattern is useful for covering a large area where no accurate datum is available. It can be used by a single vessel or several vessels, and for any size of target, though the distance of advance between search legs will vary depending on the estimated visibility of the target.

=== Creeping line ===
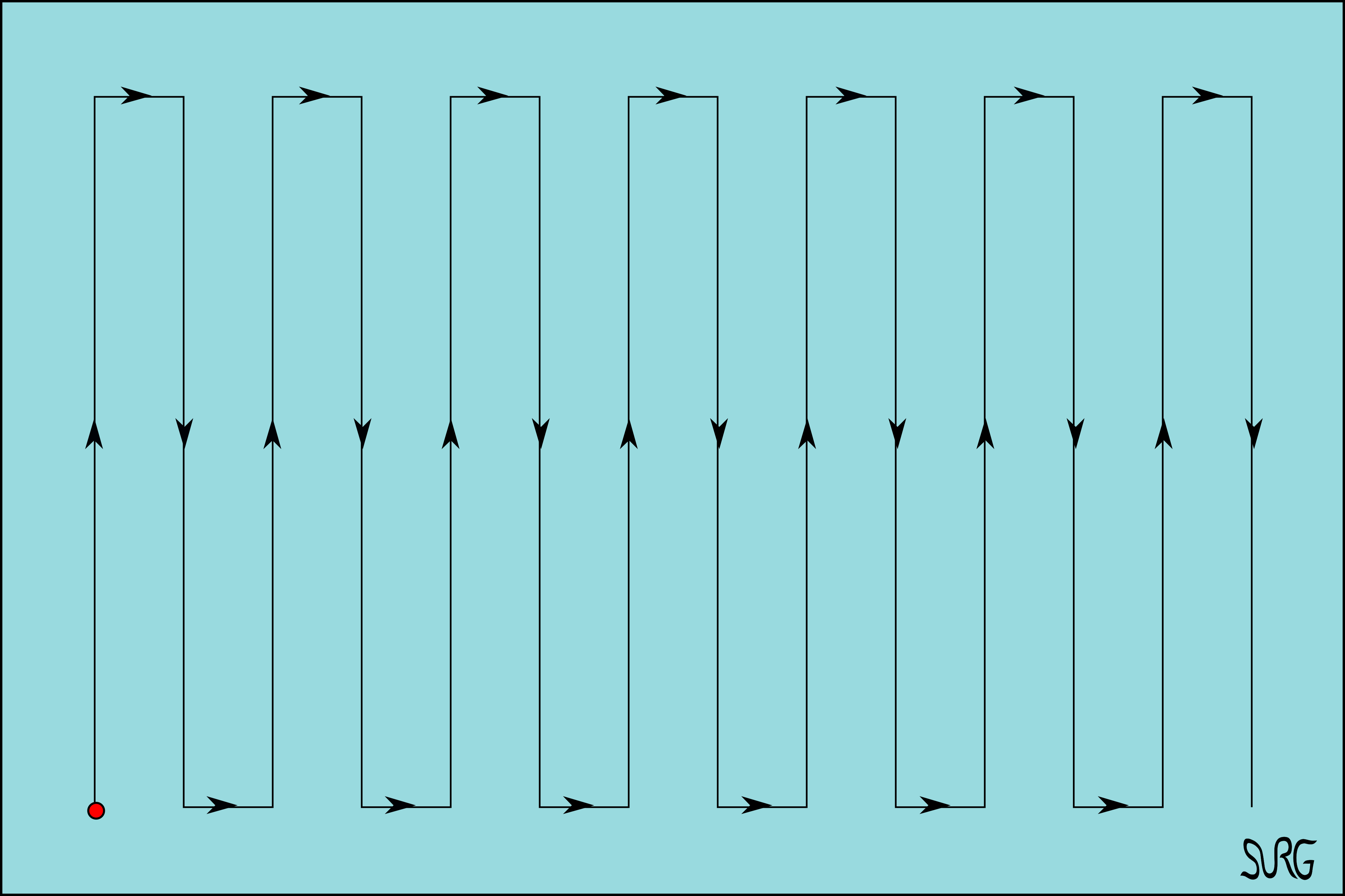
Creeping line search pattern (Charlie Sierra)

Also known as Charlie Sierra (CS), a creeping line search pattern uses as back-and-forth pattern of search legs spaced according to the estimated target visibility range, but with relatively shorter legs, and is used in similar circumstances to a parallel track pattern, particularly when the target is expected to be at one end of the search area. The creeping line is considered more effective in areas of drift or current constrained by shorelines, such as in narrow bays or channels, where the legs are run across the current and progress against the flow.

=== Barrier search ===
Barrier on River. Green circle is sweep width

Also known as Bravo Sierra (BS), the barrier search pattern is used when there are strong currents or drift which are expected to carry the target through a gap between geographically fixed points of reference downstream of the estimated datum. The vessel will be steered to keep approximately on the barrier line as it repeatedly traverses the gap.

=== Expanding square search ===
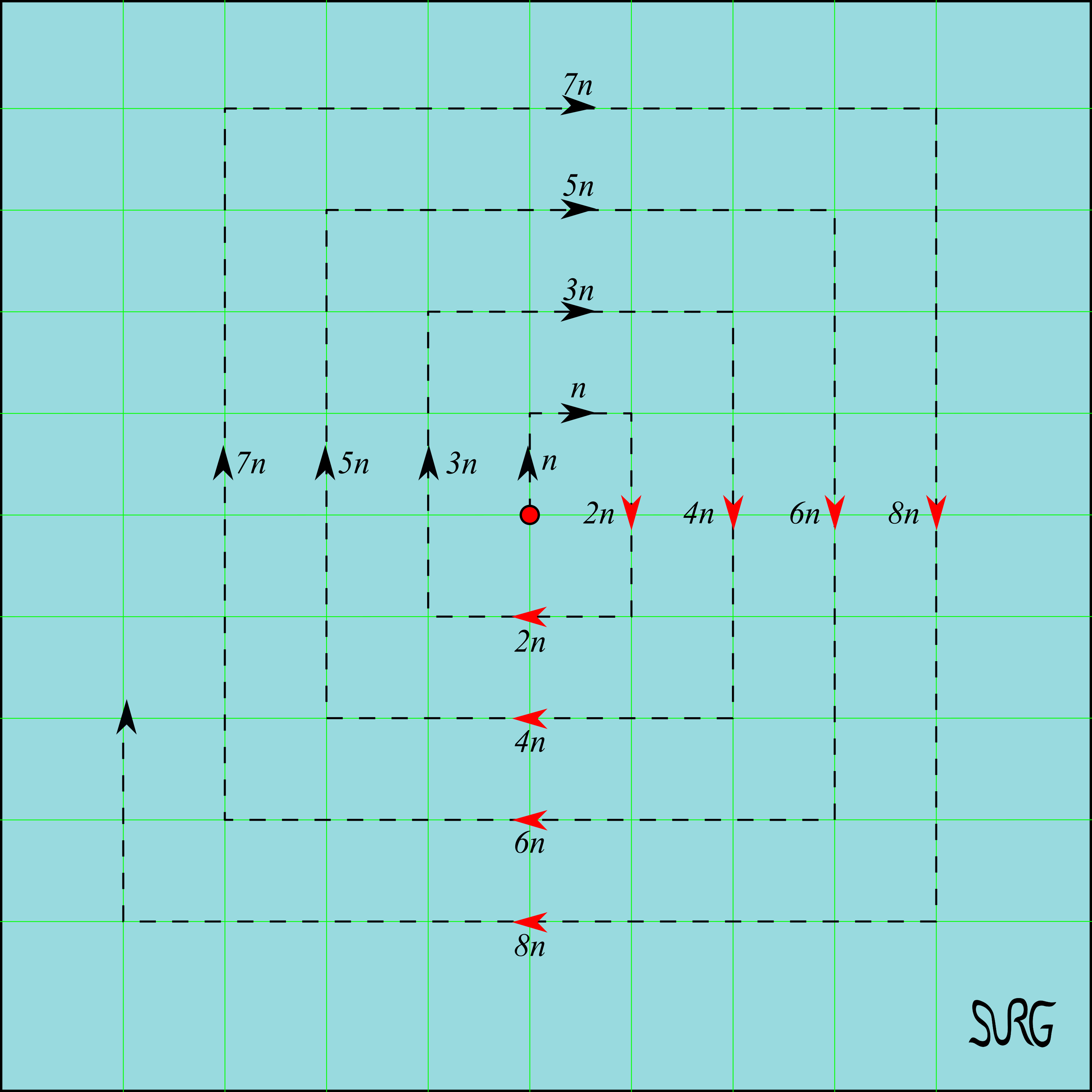
Expanding square search pattern

This pattern is used when the datum is relatively precisely known, and drift is likely to be small. The datum marker is deployed at the estimated datum, and the search starts from there, with the leg length incrementing by the same time at every second turn. All turns are 90° in the same rotational direction (usually to the right). A constant speed of between 5 and 10 knots is suggested for a search for a person in the water, and leg length is determined by time. Track spacing is determined by visibility of the target, and is equal to the length of the first leg. The track expands outward continuously and is superimposed over drift. It is necessary to keep accurate record of leg length increments to ensure that they occur at the right times and at the right turns.

== Target detection ==
- Distress signal

=== Visual search ===
- Spotters - disposition, task
- Day/night: In all cases a small target will show up best against a contrasting background, with a minimum of glare, and the search pattern may be adapted to provide better conditions for spotting. Night vision goggles can be useful to help spotters to pick out objects in the dark by magnifying existing ambient light, but effectiveness can be reduced by light reflected from snow, rain, fog or spray particles. Infra-red night vision systems show an image based on temperature differences. Both of these systems work best when the background is free of distractors like city lights on a shoreline, or navigation lights of nearby vessels.
- Illumination: Searchlights and parachute flares may be useful at night.
- Effective visual range varies with elevation, illumination, glare, backlighting and sea conditions. The search must be adapted to suit.
- Visual search technique. Effectiveness of active visual search depends on effective technique. A system recommended by the Canadian Coastguard is to start a sweep at short range, and to work outwards across the designated sector in a series of parallel sweeps, out to the limit of perception, followed by a short break and then another search of the sector. Head movement is recommended when sweeping to reduce overtaxing the eye muscles, which can cause early fatigue. Sweeps performed in 10 to 15 degree segments, with a refocus at the end of each segment allow the eyes to register objects within about 8 degrees around the direction of focus. omitting the focusing steps reduces efficiency of detection. Peripheral vision is more sensitive to low intensity light, and this can be applied at night to detect weak light only detectable at the edges of perception.

=== Radar ===
Radar has a large range and can be very effective at detecting objects with a form and material suitable for reflecting radio waves back towards their source. Electrically conductive materials reflect radio frequencies, and the direction is of reflection is determined by the surface geometry. Strength of the return signal is also a function of projected area of the part of the reflecting surface with suitable geometry. Seagoing vessels often carry devices specifically designed to improve the return reflection of radar signals.

== Sweep width and track spacing ==
Sweep width is the distance that from the search platform that the spotters can effectively cover. It is affected by all the factors that affect detection of the target from the search platform, such as the size, colour, and type of the target, sea and atmospheric conditions, spray, glare, and illumination, distractors like flotsam, search platform speed and motion, number and eye-level elevation of spotters, and crew fatigue. It is further modified by applying a coverage factor for overlap to determine the track spacing. Some overlap reduces the risk of missing the target altogether, but increases the time taken to carry out the search coverage of a given area.

== See also ==
Other articles related to physical searches:

- Bayesian search theory – Method for finding lost objects
- Body search – Act of searching a person's outer clothing to detect concealed objects
- Cordon and search – Military tactic in counterinsurgency operations
- Diver rescue – Rescue of a distressed or incapacitated diver
- Emergency management – Dealing with all humanitarian aspects of emergencies
- Forensic search – Field of computer forensics
- Underwater search and recovery – Locating and recovering underwater objects
- Search and rescue – Search for and provision of aid to people who are in distress or imminent danger
  - Air-sea rescue – Coordinated search and rescue of survivors at sea
  - Combat search and rescue – Military personnel recovery from battlefield and enemy occupied areas
  - Mounted search and rescue – Specialty within search and rescue
  - Search and rescue dog – Dog trained to locate or retrieve a missing or trapped person
  - Surface water rescue – Rescue of a person who is at the surface of a body of water
  - Technical rescue – Use of specialised tools and skills for rescue
  - Wilderness search and rescue – Techniques applicable to wild areas
  - Urban search and rescue – Type of technical rescue operation
- Search and seizure – Police powers
- Visual search – Type of perceptual task requiring attention

Underwater searches#Spiral box search
