= Search (novel) =

2022 novel by Michelle Huneven

- Cover of the 2022 Penguin Press edition
- Author: Michelle Huneven
- Language: English
- Publisher: Penguin Press
- Publication date: 2022
- ISBN: 978-0-593-30005-3 (first edition, hardcover)
- Dewey Decimal: 813.54
- LC Class: PS3558.U4662 S43

Search is a 2022 American novel written by Michelle Huneven. The novel is written as a fictionalized memoir by memoirist Dana Potowski, a food critic and memoirist who joins her Unitarian Universalist congregation's year-long search for a new minister.

The novel was based on Huneven's own experiences as a food critic and Unitarian Universalist. While promoting the book Huneven admitted that she intended to try to write one of Dana Potowski's fictional memoirs, Our Best Year, about her year cooking for her ill mother, turning it into a YA book.

== Plot ==
Dana Potowski is a 54 year old married and childless food critic and memoirist who has lately been drifting from her Unitarian Universalist congregation. Board members, who know she is close to the minister, ask her to find out what his plans are—if he's going to stay for five years or retire. The Rev. Tom Fox in fact volunteers that he is planning to leave the ministry for a new career, so a search committee must be formed and the yearlong process to find a new minister must be undertaken.

Fox urges Dana to apply for the committee and she does, becoming one of eight members of the congregation chosen for the job. Joining Dana on the search committee are two active members of the church, Belinda and Charlotte, Sam who married into the powerful Rourke family who were founding members of the congregation, Adrian, a middle aged therapist, and three young people: Jennie, Riley and Curtis.

== Reception ==
Dan Cryer of The L.A. Times called it "sassy and savvy"; he writes that it is funny, though "not quite a satire, since Huneven has too much respect for all her seekers". Kirkus called it "tender, salty, and worthy of note". Describing it as "folsky", the review praised Huneven's development of church politics intrigue but criticized the memoir frame and some subplots.
