= Search engine (disambiguation) =

Search engine is a term commonly used to refer to a web search engine.

Search engine may also refer to:

- Search engine (computing), an information retrieval system designed to help find information stored on a computer system
- Enterprise search engine, a search engine to search enterprise documents as opposed to general web search
- website search engine, a search engine to search a website, such as Google Programmable Search Engine
- vertical search engine, focuses on a specific segment of online content
- Search as a service, enterprise search or site-specific web search
- Search engine front end request proxy server, software that mimics a browser request to improve privacy and reduce distractions

== Media ==
- Search Engine (radio show), a Canadian podcast by Jesse Brown
- The Search Engine, a 2012 album by DJ Food

== See also ==
- Search algorithm or solver, software that finds a solution to a mathematical problem by searching
- Search and optimization in artificial intelligence
