= Parachutist Badge (Malaysia) =

Malaysian professional proficiency badge

Parachutist badge
- Native name: Lencana Payung Terjun
- Type: Skill badge
- Awarded for: Completion of parachutist training
- Country: Malaysia
- Presented by: Authorised parachute schools
- Status: Currently awarded

The Parachutist Badge (Malay: Lencana Payung Terjun; Jawi: لنچان ڤايوڠ ترجون), commonly referred to as Jump Wings (Malay: Sayap Penerjunan; Jawi: سايڤ ڤنرجونن), is a prestigious skill badge awarded to uniformed personnel in Malaysia who have successfully completed the Basic Parachute Course or higher. This qualification is not restricted to the Malaysian Armed Forces (MAF); it is also available to other government agencies that maintain parachute-trained units. In the Malaysian context, the badge serves as a symbol of entry into an elite airborne brotherhood.

The badge signifies that the wearer possesses the foundational qualifications required to participate in airborne operations. Beyond operational personnel, honorary badges are occasionally bestowed upon VIPs as a mark of respect and inclusion within the airborne community.

The badge is produced in three distinct versions to match various uniform types:

- Silver Metal: The most common variant, worn on standard working and service dress uniforms.
- Subdued (Black and Olive): A cloth version worn on field or combat uniforms for tactical purposes.
- Silver and Gold Embroidered: A high-visibility or bullion version utilised specifically for ceremonial and mess dress uniforms.

The badge follows a hierarchical structure based on experience and specialised training. It ranges from the Basic Parachutist Badge at the entry level to the Parachutist Badge (Instructor) at the highest level. Depending on the specific uniformed service, the system may consist of four to seven distinct tiers, often distinguished by additional elements like stars or wreaths on the insignia.

While the concept remains the same, there are at least five primary design variations utilised by different organisations in Malaysia:

- Malaysian Armed Forces parachutist badge: The MAF has the same design across all of the branches
- Royal Malaysia Police parachutist badge
- Fire and Rescue Department of Malaysia parachutist badge
- Johor Military Force parachutist badge
- Scouts Association of Malaysia parachutist badge

== Parachute schools ==
Currently, there are four government-operated parachute schools in Malaysia that offer parachutist courses.

- Special Warfare Training Centre
- RMAF Combat Training School
- 69 Commando Training Centre
- Fire and Rescue Academy of Malaysia

== History ==
A brief history of parachuting in Malaysia.

=== Origins: The Second World War and Force 136 ===
During the Second World War, Force 136, the Far East branch of the Special Operations Executive (SOE), utilised parachute insertions as one of the methods for deploying agents into occupied Malaya and Borneo. These agents, many of whom were recruited from the local population, underwent rigorous parachute training with Commonwealth militaries in Australia, British India, and the United Kingdom.

Following the conclusion of the war, several of these veterans continued their service within the nascent Federation of Malaya's security forces. Their expertise in unconventional warfare and airborne operations proved instrumental in shaping the foundational structure of the Malaysian Special Forces.

=== The Malayan Emergency and the Malayan Scouts ===
The power vacuum following the Japanese surrender in 1945 led to a period of significant instability that escalated into the Malayan Emergency in 1948. To combat communist insurgents operating within the nation's dense interior, the Malayan Scouts (the precursor to the modern Special Air Service) were founded in 1950.

Owing to the extreme difficulty of terrestrial movement through the thick rainforest, the Scouts began utilising parachute techniques for troop insertion starting in 1952. To facilitate this, the Far East Transport Wing Parachute School was established at RAF Changi (present-day Changi Air Base) in 1952. This facility was primarily utilised to train the Malayan Scouts and their various squadrons in airborne operations.

To enhance operational readiness, the school also deployed instructors to RAF Kuala Lumpur (present-day RMAF Kuala Lumpur). This allowed for the provision of additional static-line training closer to the front lines, while also overseeing critical aerial resupply missions launched from the Kuala Lumpur airbase. These developments ensured that the Scouts could be deployed and sustained deep within insurgent-controlled territory, regardless of the lack of accessible roads or tracks.

In addition to the Malayan Scouts, other parachute units operated from Malaya during the post-war period. The British Army 5th Parachute Brigade was stationed in the region, with its units divided between British Malaya (including Crown Colony of Singapore) and the Dutch East Indies (present-day Indonesia).

The brigade continued its operations in Malaya until August 1946, when a significant internal crisis occurred. Personnel from the 13th (Lancashire) Parachute Battalion, a unit under the 5th Parachute Brigade, engaged in a mutiny. This act of insubordination ultimately led to the decision by British military authorities to disband the entire 5th Parachute Brigade on 13 September 1946.

==== Technical innovation: "Tree jumping" ====
The environmental constraints of the Malayan jungle led to the development of a unique technique known as "canopy drop" or "tree jumping" by the Malayan Scouts. Aircraft would fly at low altitudes between 100 to 200 feet (30 to 61 m) above the forest canopy to drop patrols or supplies directly onto the treetops. This method was specifically designed to:

- Prevent Dispersion: Reducing the distance between troops upon landing.
- Minimise Damage: Limiting injuries to personnel and damage to equipment caused by getting caught on trees.

=== Independence and the relocation to other RAF airbases ===
In 1957, following the independence of the Federation of Malaya, several major military installations previously under the control of Commonwealth forces were transitioned to local authority. While some bases remained under Commonwealth administration during the transition period, RAF Kuala Lumpur was officially handed over to the Federation.

By 1958, the parachute training school in RAF Kuala Lumpur relocated to RAF Gong Kedak (present-day RMAF Gong Kedak Air Base) in Kelantan. This facility became a hub for airborne operations in the region and received significant assistance from the Royal New Zealand Air Force (RNZAF). During this period of transition, the original parachute school at RAF Changi in Singapore remained fully operational, ensuring a continued training pipeline for Commonwealth and local units in South East Asia. The schools served several critical functions during this era:

- Training Commonwealth Units: It was utilised to train elite airborne units such as the Gurkha (Independent) Parachute Company, maintaining the high standards of airborne proficiency required for jungle warfare.
- Operational Resupply: The airbase served as a base for conducting aerial resupply missions (airdrops) to Commonwealth forces stationed along the volatile Malaysia–Thailand border regions.

The parachute training school continued to operate in Malaysia and Singapore until 1971, marking the end of the permanent British-led airborne training presence in those countries.

=== The Indonesia–Malaysia Confrontation and the Birth of Malaysian Special Forces ===
Following the conclusion of the Malayan Emergency in 1960, Malaysia faced a new armed conflict in 1963. The unification of Malaya, the Crown Colony of North Borneo (present-day Sabah), the Crown Colony of Sarawak, and the Crown Colony of Singapore to form Malaysia was opposed by President Sukarno of Indonesia. He characterised Malaysia as a puppet state for British neo-colonisation and launched a military campaign, deploying troops to attack both East and West Malaysia.

A significant tactical element of this conflict was the use of airborne insertions by Indonesian forces. These incursions highlighted the strategic importance of parachute training for Malaysian security. The conflict also accelerated the formation of Malaysia's own special forces units, specifically the Malaysian Special Service Unit (MSSU), which is known today as Gerak Khas. The MSSU subsequently became the first Malaysian-owned unit to be formally trained in airborne operations, establishing the foundation for the nation's domestic airborne capabilities.

=== Post-Independence Formalisation of Parachute Training ===
Around 1967, Zulu Squadron of the Malaysian Special Service Unit (MSSU) became the first unit within the Malaysian Armed Forces (MAF) to receive formal parachute training. To build this capability, members of the squadron were dispatched in phases to receive parachute training at the Far East Transport Wing Parachute School at RAF Changi and the RNZAF Parachute Training and Support Unit in New Zealand.

This historical lineage was prominently reflected in the older emblem of Zulu Squadron, which featured a parachute at its centre. During this era, Malaysian soldiers who qualified as paratroopers wore the British Parachutist Wings. However, to distinguish themselves, the Malaysian version utilised a unique dark brown background rather than the standard British military backing.

When the RAF parachute training school ceased operations in Malaysia and the Gurkha (Independent) Parachute Company relocated to Hong Kong in 1971, Malaysia was left without a formal domestic parachute school.

=== Expansion to the Royal Malaysia Police ===
In 1978, the 69 Commando, the elite unit of the Royal Malaysia Police (RMP), sent a pioneer team of 65 personnel to Hua Hin, Thailand. They received training from the Border Patrol Police of the Royal Thai Police. This initiative paved the way for the RMP to eventually establish its own independent airborne training capabilities.

=== The Establishment of Domestic Parachute Schools ===
In 1979, the MAF sent a dedicated team to the RNZAF Parachute Training and Support Unit in New Zealand to qualify as instructors. Upon their return, they established the Parachute Wing at the Special Warfare Training Centre (SWTC) in Camp Sungai Udang, Malacca. This facility became the first government-owned parachute school in post-independence Malaysia.

Following this, other parachute schools were established:

- RMAF Parachute School: The Royal Malaysian Air Force utilised the former British facilities at RAF Kuala Lumpur to create its own training centre.
- Fire and Rescue Academy of Malaysia: In 2000, the Fire and Rescue Department of Malaysia (FRDM) created a parachute school to train "smoke jumpers" for rapid response to forest fires. The pioneer team of smoke jumpers was trained by the RMAF, resulting in a syllabus that closely mirrors the standards used by the Malaysian Armed Forces.
- RMP Parachute and Diving Training Centre: A specialised facility operated by the Royal Malaysia Police (RMP), situated within Camp Sultan Nazrin Shah. The centre provides comprehensive instruction in airborne operations and diving courses for RMP personnel as well as members of other government agencies.

== Versions ==
=== Malaysian Armed Forces ===
The Malaysian Armed Forces (MAF) operates two primary parachute schools. These institutions provide training not only to local military personnel but also to international students and members of various non-military government agencies. The schools are as follows:

- Special Warfare Training Centre: Based at Camp Sungai Udang, Malacca, this school is operated for the Malaysian Army by the Parachute Wing of the Army Training and Doctrine Command.
- Parachute Wing of the RMAF Combat Training School: Located at RMAF Jugra Airbase, Selangor. Operated by the Parachute Training Flight, the facility serves as a primary hub for airborne training within the RMAF and functions as a core component of the broader RMAF Combat Training School.

Upon successful completion of the course at either of these schools, trainees are awarded the MAF Parachutist Badge. Royal Malaysian Navy personnel are also eligible for this badge, provided they complete a Basic Parachute Course at any government-owned facility, including those operated by the Royal Malaysia Police (RMP) or the Fire and Rescue Department (FRDM). These tiers are ranked from lowest to highest as follows:

Malaysian Armed Forces Parachutist Badge levels
Name (English)	Name (Malay)	Design	Prerequisite
Basic Parachutist Badge	Sayap Asas Payung Terjun		Complete the Basic Static Line Parachute Course; Complete 8 static line jumps with at least 2 jumps with full battle gear
Pathfinder Badge	Sayap Pandu Arah		Recipient of the Basic Parachutist Badge; Complete the Pathfinder Course
Rigger Badge	Sayap Pelipat Payung		Recipient of the Basic Parachutist Badge; Complete the Basic Rigger Course; Complete 2 static line jumps with parachutes that the trainees themselves have folded
Senior Parachutist Badge	Sayap Bintang Remaja		Recipient of the Basic Parachutist Badge; Complete 50 or more static jumps
Free Fall Parachutist Badge	Sayap Terjun Bebas		Recipient of the Basic Parachutist Badge; Complete the Basic Free Fall Course; Complete 21 free fall jumps with at least 4 jumps with full battle gear
Jump Master Parachutist Badge	Sayap Ketua Penerjunan		Recipient of the Senior Parachutist Badge; Complete the Jump Master Course; Complete 21 static line jumps with at least 18 jumps with full battle gear
Parachutist Badge (Instructor)	Sayap Jurulatih Payung Terjun		Recipient of the Jump Master Parachutist Badge; Certified as an instructor for at least three intake series for any types of parachutist courses (static line/pathfinder/rigger/free fall/jump master); Complete the Parachutist Instructor Course

==== Evolution of the MAF Parachutist Badge Design ====
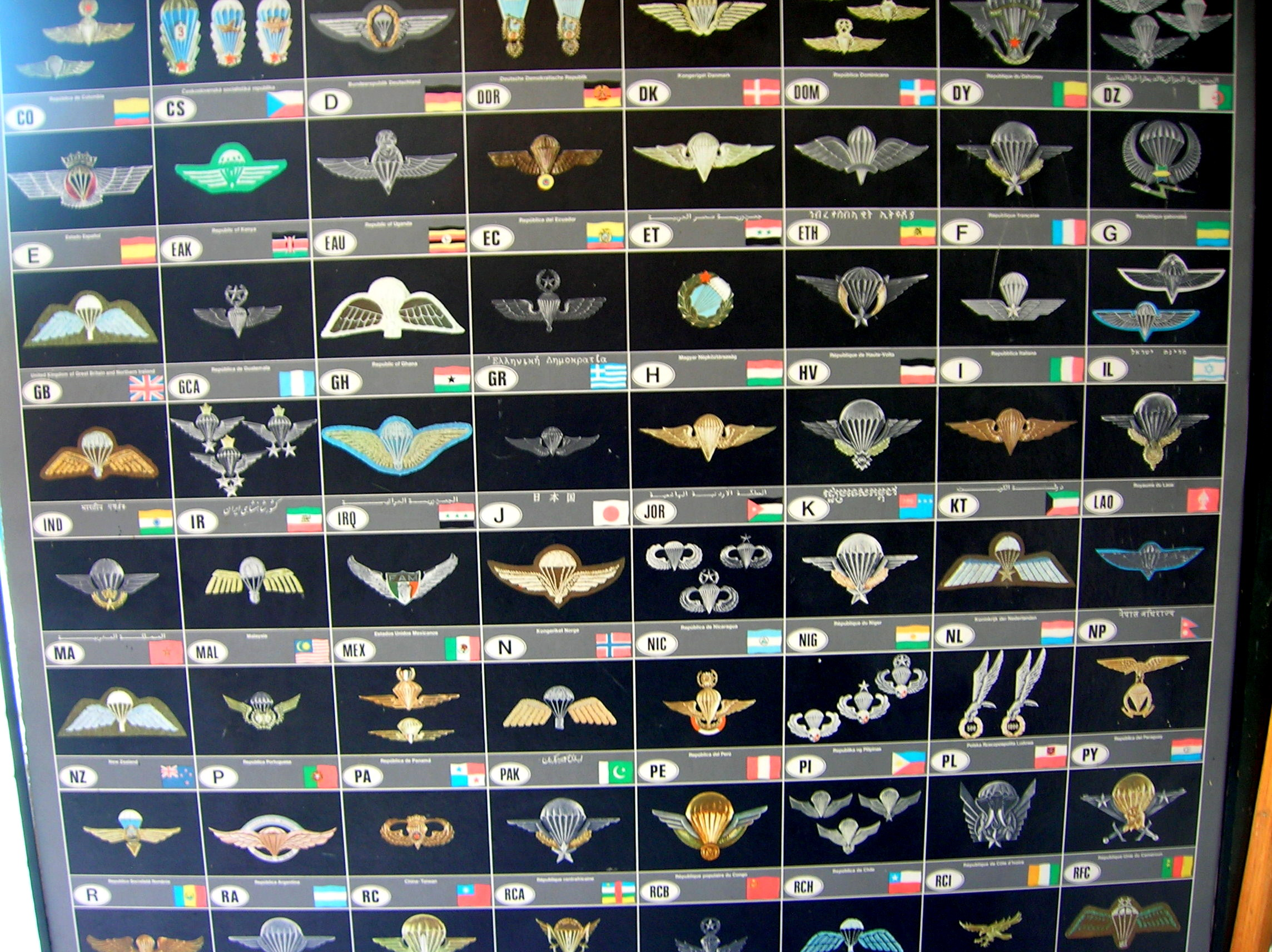
The 1976 German publication Parachutist Badges of the World features an extensive collection of airborne insignia from various nations. Within this print, the Malaysian parachutist badge is documented under the label "MAL", reflecting a design from that era that bears a significant resemblance to the British parachutist badge.

The design of the Malaysian Armed Forces (MAF) Parachutist Badge has undergone three major stages of evolution, reflecting the changing nature of the nation's airborne forces and their international influences.

===== 1967 to Mid-1980s: The British and New Zealand Influence =====
During this initial period, Malaysian airborne troops were primarily trained by the Royal Air Force (RAF) and the Royal New Zealand Air Force (RNZAF). Consequently, the badge design was nearly identical to the United Kingdom Parachute Badge with Wings. This era established the foundational standards for Malaysian airborne forces, heavily leaning on Commonwealth traditions.

===== Mid-1980s to Mid-1990s: The Special Forces Design =====
In the mid-1980s, the Special Warfare Training Centre (SWTC) introduced a new design inspired by the Special Air Service Parachutist Badge. This shift was driven by two primary factors:

- Status Distinction: At the time, nearly all parachute-trained personnel in the MAF were members of Gerak Khas (Special Forces). Leadership felt that the standard British "regular" wings did not sufficiently reflect the elite status of special forces.
- National Identity: There was a strong desire to establish a unique, home-grown insignia that belonged specifically to Malaysia.

===== Mid-1990s to Present =====
With the formation of regular airborne units, such as the 8th Battalion (Parachute) Royal Rangers, the Special Forces-centric design became less practical for the wider army. A "neutral" badge was designed to be worn by all parachute-trained personnel, regardless of whether they were in special forces or regular airborne units.

The current insignia is inspired by the Second World War-era British Armed Forces Parachute Badge (Tropical Dress), which was traditionally worn by airborne-trained British troops stationed in tropical regions. This design choice maintains a historical link to Commonwealth traditions while providing a distinct look for the modern Malaysian Armed Forces (MAF). While the badge design is now standardised across the MAF, a specific distinction exists for the 10th Parachute Brigade. This brigade serves as the Malaysian Army's special operations infantry, frequently compared to the US Army's 75th Ranger Regiment. Personnel who graduate from the Basic Rapid Deployment Force Course (associated with the 10th Parachute Brigade) wear a blood-red cloth lapel behind their badge.

=== Royal Malaysia Police ===
The Royal Malaysia Police (RMP) maintains its own independent airborne training capability through a dedicated facility. This school, known as the Parachute and Diving Training Centre, is situated at Camp Sultan Nazrin Shah in Ulu Kinta, Perak. It is operated by the Parachute Training Division of the 69 Commando.

Personnel who successfully complete the Basic Parachute Course at this centre are awarded the RMP version of the Parachutist Badge. Additionally, the RMP permits its officers to wear the MAF Parachutist Badge or the FRDM Parachutist Badge if they have graduated from the respective schools of those organisations.

The design of the RMP Parachutist Badge is heavily inspired by the Thailand Border Patrol Police Basic Parachute Wings. This historical influence dates back to 1978, when the pioneer group of 69 Commando airborne personnel was sent to Hua Hin, Thailand, to receive their basic parachute training. The RMP Parachutist Badge is structured into four distinct tiers, which represent the wearer's level of proficiency within the airborne unit. These tiers are ranked from lowest to highest as follows:

Royal Malaysia Police Parachutist Badge levels
Name (English)	Name (Malay)	Design	Prerequisite
Static Line Parachutist Badge	Lencana Sayap Penerjun Asas Statik		Complete the Basic Parachute Course (Static line); Complete 6 static line jumps with at least 1 jumps with full battle gear
Free Fall Parachutist Badge	Lencana Sayap Penerjun Bebas		Recipient of the MAF Basic Parachutist Badge or the Static Line Parachutist Badge; Complete the Basic Free Fall Tactical Infiltration Course; Complete 19 free fall jumps
Jump Master Parachutist Badge	Lencana Sayap Penerjun (Ketua Penerjun)		Recipient of the MAF Basic Parachutist Badge or the Static Line Parachutist Badge; AND: Complete the Jump Master Course at the Special Warfare Training Centre (SWTC); OR: Complete 300 or more free fall jumps and has served as an assistant instructor for at least three (3) intake series for the Basic Parachute Course (Static line). Must be nominated by the Commanding Officer of 69 Commando and those who have the Para Jump Instructor Parachutist Badge
Para Jump Instructor Parachutist Badge	Lencana Sayap Ketua Jurulatih Penerjun		Recipient of the Jump Master Parachutist Badge; AND: Complete the Parachutist Instructor Course at SWTC; OR: Complete the Accelerated Free Fall (AFF) Instructor Course at the United States Parachute Association (USPA); OR: Complete 500 or more free fall jumps and has served as an assistant instructor for at least three (3) intake series for the Basic Free Fall Tactical Infiltration Course. Must be nominated by the Commanding Officer of 69 Commando and those who have the Para Jump Instructor Parachutist Badge

=== Fire and Rescue Department of Malaysia ===
The Fire and Rescue Department of Malaysia (FRDM) maintains a specialised parachute school dedicated to training airborne firefighters. These personnel, commonly referred to as "Smoke Jumpers", are designed for rapid deployment into inaccessible wildfire locations, such as deep jungle and mountainous terrain, to contain fires before they escalate.

The school is situated at the Fire and Rescue Academy of Malaysia (FRAM) Central Region and is supported by the FRDM Central Region Airbase. While its primary mission is training FRDM personnel, the facility also provides instruction to other government agencies, including the Malaysian Armed Forces, the Royal Malaysia Police, and the Malaysian Coast Guard.

The curriculum offered by the FRDM is distinct from other Malaysian jump schools. Unlike the standard round-canopy training, the FRDM offers the Basic Static Ram-Air Course. This is considered more advanced than a traditional Basic Parachute Course for several reasons:

- Steerable Canopies: Trainees use ram-air parachutes (square canopies) similar to those used in free fall operations.
- Static-Line Deployment: The parachute is hooked to a static line inside the aircraft, ensuring it opens automatically upon exit.
- Precision Manoeuvrability: This technique allows smoke jumpers to steer and manoeuvre through complex environments, such as mountainous terrain and tight jungle clearings, which is essential for wildfire operations.

The FRDM's parachute school shares a direct lineage with the RMAF Combat Training School. In 2000, the pioneer group from FRDM Multi-Skill Team was sent to RMAF Kuala Lumpur to undergo both the Basic Parachute and Basic Free Fall courses under the instruction of RMAF Special Forces instructors. To meet the specific operational needs of the fire service, these techniques were eventually synthesised into the current Static Ram-Air curriculum.

The FRDM Parachutist Badge is silver in colour and features a unique design that is highly distinct from the airborne insignia of other nations. The Parachutist Badge is structured into seven tiers. The tiers are ranked from lowest to highest as follows:

Fire and Rescue Department of Malaysia Parachutist Badge levels
Name (English)	Name (Malay)	Design	Prerequisite
Junior Jumpers Parachutist Badge	—		Complete the Basic Static Ram-Air Course; Complete 12 Static Ram-Air jumps
Senior Jumpers Parachutist Badge	—		Recipient of the Junior Jumpers Parachutist Badge; Complete 21 or more Static Ram-Air jumps
Rigger Parachutist Badge	—		Recipient of the Junior Jumpers Parachutist Badge; Complete the Basic Rigger Course
Master Rigger Parachutist Badge	—		Recipient of the Rigger Parachutist Badge; Complete the Rigger Course (Instructor); AND: Certified as an instructor for the Basic Rigger Course; OR: Certified as a Master Rigger
Free Fall Parachutist Badge	—		Recipient of the Junior Jumpers Parachutist Badge; Complete the Basic Free Fall Course
Jump Master Parachutist Badge	—		Recipient of the Senior Jumpers Parachutist Badge; Complete the Jump Master Course; Must receive approvals from senior jump masters or above
Parajump Instructor Parachutist Badge	—		Recipient of the Jump Master Parachutist Badge; Complete the Parajump Instructor Course; Certified as an instructor for both the Basic Static Ram-Air Course and the Basic Free Fall Course

=== Johor Military Force ===
The Johor Military Force (JMF) (Malay: Askar Timbalan Setia Negeri Johor) is an independent military body maintained by the state of Johor. Its primary mission is to serve as the private royal guard for the Sultan of Johor, providing protection for the Sultan, the Johor Royal Family, senior state government officials, and royal properties.

The design of the JMF Parachutist Badge is a tribute to the military career of the current Sultan of Johor, Sultan Ibrahim Iskandar. In the late 1970s, following his graduation from the U.S. Army Officer Candidate School (OCS) at Fort Benning, the Sultan successfully completed airborne training in the United States. In recognition of this lineage, the JMF insignia is heavily inspired by the U.S. Army Military Parachutist Badge. However, the JMF version is distinguished by its gold colour, reflecting its status as a royal guard unit.

Currently, the JMF does not operate its own parachute school. Instead, JMF personnel are dispatched to Malaysian government-owned parachute schools, such as the Special Warfare Training Centre (SWTC) or the RMAF Combat Training School, to receive their airborne training. Upon the successful completion of the course, these personnel return to their military bases in Johor, where they are officially awarded the gold JMF Parachutist Badge.

=== Scouts Association of Malaysia ===
The scouting movement in Malaysia is another official body authorised to award a parachutist badge. This insignia is categorised as a Scouting Skills Badge (Malay: Lencana Kemahiran Pengakap). Its usage and the movement itself are protected under Malaysian law, specifically the Akta Persekutuan Pengakap-Pengakap Malaysia (Pemerbadanan) 1968 (Act 784).

To earn the Scouts Parajump Parachutist Badge, personnel must undergo the Basic Static Line Parachutist Course. This specialised programme is organised by the Scouts Association of Malaysia in close cooperation with the Civil Aviation Authority of Malaysia (CAAM). It serves as a component of the Venturer Air Scout Training Scheme (Malay: Skim Latihan Pengakap Remaja Udara).

The qualification is primarily targeted toward Air Scouts (Malay: Pengakap Udara). Candidates are required to successfully complete at least one static-line jump before they are eligible to receive the badge.

== Honorary Parachutist Badge ==
The Honorary Parachutist Badge (Malay: Sayap Kehormat) is a prestigious insignia bestowed upon high-ranking and distinguished individuals (VIPs) as a mark of respect and formal inclusion within the airborne community. This honour acknowledges the recipient's contributions to the service or the strategic relationship between their organisation and the airborne units.

Recipients of these honorary wings typically include:

- Royalty: Sultans and monarchs from both Malaysia and foreign nations.
- Government Officials: Local and foreign ministers, including heads of state.
- Senior Command: High-ranking military and law enforcement personnel from Malaysia and allied nations.

While the badge represents a common spirit of airborne brotherhood, the specific design and tier awarded depend on the granting institution. When the Malaysian Armed Forces bestows honorary wings upon a dignitary, they are typically presented with the Senior Parachutist Badge. The Royal Malaysia Police utilises a unique design specifically designated for honorary recipients, ensuring the badge is distinct from those earned through the formal parachutist courses. Similarly, the Fire and Rescue Department of Malaysia has a specialised honorary version of their parachutist badge, which is in gold colour.

== Basic Parachute Course ==
The Basic Parachute Course, also known as the Basic Static Line Parachute Course, is the foundational training requirement for all uniformed personnel in Malaysia seeking to qualify as parachutists. While primarily conducted at Malaysian government-owned parachute schools, certifications from allied military parachute schools are also formally recognised and accepted.

The necessity of the course varies across different branches of the Malaysian security forces:

- Special Forces: For certain units, this is treated as an advanced qualification. It is typically mandatory only for personnel assigned to specific airborne squadrons or units.
- Rapid Deployment Force (RDF): The course is a critical component of the Malaysia Rapid Deployment Force Selection pipeline for Malaysia's elite special operations infantry. Depending on logistics, monsoon seasons, and training slots, it generally serves as either the second or third stage of the RDF selection process. Successful completion is a prerequisite for official induction into the unit.

This course is divided into three phases:

=== Phase 1: Ground training ===
The initial phase lasts for two weeks, focusing on the mastery of fundamental parachute techniques. Trainees undergo rigorous instruction to ensure that every action becomes instinctive, reducing the risk of injury in the subsequent phases.

The curriculum covers the essential mechanics of an airborne operation:

- Parachute Landing Fall (PLF): Also known as the "airborne roll", this is the most critical skill for dispersing the impact of landing.
- Emergency Protocols: Trainees learn to identify malfunctions and execute procedures for deploying the reserve parachute.
- Aerial Safety: Instruction includes handling mid-air collisions and maintaining strict aircraft discipline.
- Challenging Environments: Techniques are taught for landing in high winds, water, or dense treetops.
- Post-Landing Procedures: Trainees are taught the correct method for recovering and packing the parachute after a successful descent.

In addition to technical theory, the phase incorporates intensive physical training designed to build endurance, discipline, and camaraderie. To progress to the next phase, trainees must pass a physical assessment held every Friday. Trainees are required to meet the following minimum benchmarks:

- Running 3.2 kilometres (2.0 mi) under 16 minutes
- Rope climbing to a height of 6 metres (20 ft)
- Performing a minimum of 6 chin-up repetitions
- Completing 32 press-up repetitions under 1 minute
- Completing 32 sit-up repetitions under 1 minute
- Buddy-carry 100 metres (330 ft) distance

=== Phase 2: Tower week ===
The second phase lasts for one week and serves as the practical application of the theories mastered during Ground Training phase. The primary objective of Tower Week is to build the trainees' confidence while providing a realistic glimpse into the rigours of Phase 3 and future airborne operations. To simulate operational conditions, trainees are required to carry a minimum of 40 kilograms (88 lb) of weight for the majority of the phase. This ensures their bodies adapt to the combined weight of the parachute equipment and full battle gear.

During this phase, trainees must perform several high-intensity exercises:

- Mock aeroplane endurance: Trainees must sit for 45 minutes inside a hot, stationary mock aircraft while wearing full battle equipment. This exercise is designed to instil mental discipline and foster an appreciation for the airborne pioneers who endured similar conditions during the Second World War, the Malayan Emergency and the Communist Insurgency in Malaysia (1968–89).
- 32 feet (9.8 m) Tower Jump: This exercise focuses on the initial exit and the "shock" of the harness opening. It allows instructors to observe and correct a trainee's body position in mid-air.
- 50 feet (15 m) Exit Tower Exercise: Conducted from a greater height, this exercise reinforces the discipline required for a proper exit from an aircraft, ensuring the trainee remains composed and follows all safety protocols during the critical seconds after leaving the platform.

=== Phase 3: Jump week ===
The final phase of the Basic Parachute Course is the culmination of the previous weeks of training. During Jump Week, candidates are deployed to a selected airfield to conduct their qualifying descents. The specific airfields and drop zones (DZ) vary based on logistical requirements, with notable locations including:

- Gong Kedak DZ in Kelantan.
- Padang Terap DZ in Kedah.
- Pontian DZ (commonly referred to as the Pineapple Farm DZ) in Johor.

Candidates are generally required to successfully complete eight static-line jumps to qualify for their wings. These jumps are conducted under varying conditions to ensure operational versatility:

- Day and night descents: Trainees must prove proficiency in both high-visibility and low-light environments.
- Full battle equipment: At least two jumps must be performed while carrying a full combat load, including weaponry and tactical gear.
- Weather contingencies: If adverse weather conditions persist, the requirement may be reduced to a minimum of six or seven jumps at the discretion of the Jump Master.

The awarding of the Parachutist Badge differs depending on the candidate's specific training track:

- General candidates: Personnel not enrolled in the full Rapid Deployment Force (RDF) selection pipeline receive their badge in a formal graduation ceremony immediately following the final successful jump.
- RDF selection pipeline candidates: For those undergoing the full elite RDF selection, the process is more rigorous. While they complete the jumps, their instructors retain the physical parachutist badge. The wings are only officially awarded once the candidate successfully completes the Basic Rapid Deployment Force Course. This ensures the badge remains a symbol of both airborne proficiency and the endurance required for the elite 10th Parachute Brigade.

== See also ==
- Parachutist Badge (United Kingdom)
- Parachutist Badge (United States)
- Military badges of Malaysia
