= Parachutist Badge (United Kingdom) =

Award for military parachutists

Parachute Badge with Wings
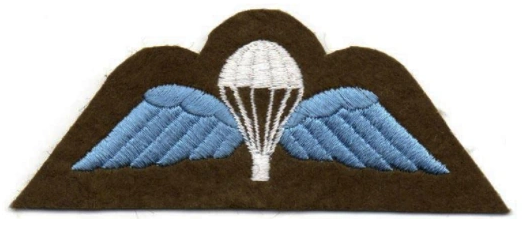
- Parachute Badge with Wings
- Type: Military Badge
- Awarded for: Military Parachutist Proficiency
- Description: Comes in several versions
- Presented by: the United Kingdom
- Eligibility: Soldiers of the British armed forces and Allied nations
- Status: Currently awarded

The British Armed Forces award a range of Parachutist Badges to those qualified as military parachutists. The version awarded depends largely on the unit or role that the individual fills following qualification.

== History ==
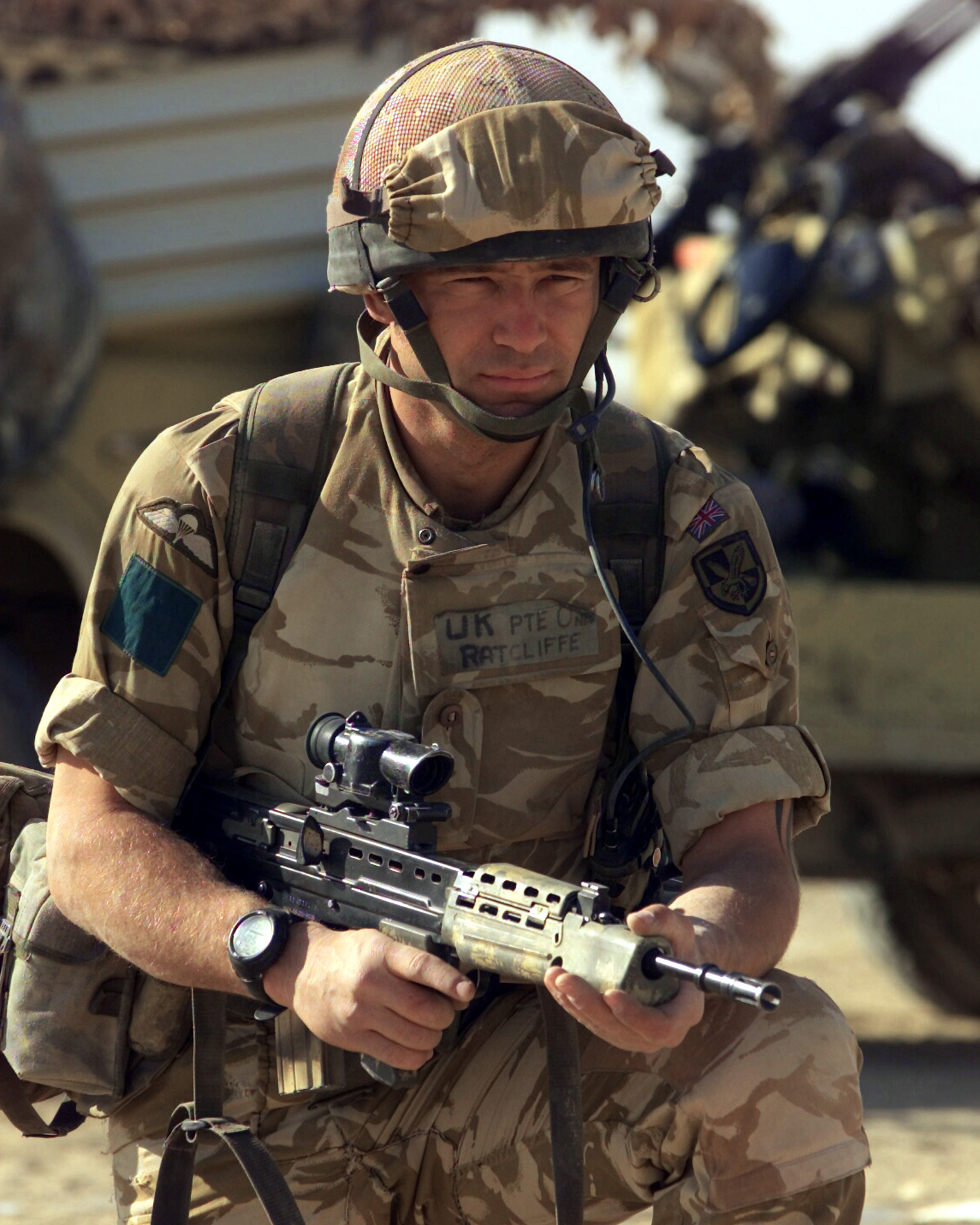
Member of 3rd Battalion, Parachute Regiment showing Parachute Badge with Wings on his right sleeve

During World War II with forming of the first British Airborne units parachute training was a 12-day course carried out at the No. 1 Parachute Training School, RAF Ringway. Recruits initially jumped from a converted barrage balloon and finished with five parachute jumps from an aircraft. Anyone failing to complete a parachute jump was returned to his old unit (known as "returned to unit" or "RTU"). At the end of the course, new Paras were presented with their maroon beret and parachute wings and posted to a parachute battalion.

Currently British military personnel must complete the Basic Parachute Course, which is held by No 1 Parachute Training School at RAF Brize Norton, a 9-jump course attended by personnel from all branches of the UK Armed Forces. Troops make each descent from a C-130 or Skyvan aircraft using the Low Level Parachute at heights of 800 ft and 1000 ft. On successful completion of their nine descents, trainees are presented with their 'wings' by the Officer Commanding No. 1 Parachute Training School, and return to their units as qualified parachutists.

== Versions ==
=== Royal Navy ===
Qualified military parachutists shall wear the Army pattern parachutist badge, a parachute with wings, to be worn on the right arm 31mm below the shoulder seam, as follows:

- No 1 Uniform. The full-sized badge in gold on blue.
- No 2 Uniform (Mess Undress). The miniature badge (length 51mm, height 20mm) gold on blue.
- PCS/MTP. The badge is NOT to be attached or worn with RIG22 jackets, or worn with replacement RNPCS, new MTP or overalls from 1 Apr 22. IAW the RN guidance, the parachute insignia is to be worn on the velcro name badge above the name of the serving individual.

=== Army ===
The British Army has three parachute qualification badges for non Special Forces qualified soldiers:

- Assistant Parachute Jump Instructor;
- Parachute Badge with Wings (also used by the Royal Marines and Royal Navy)
- Parachute Badge without Wings.

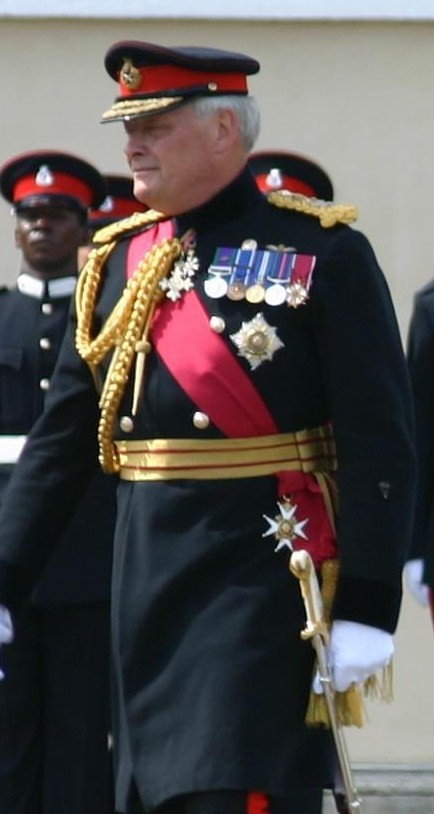
Field Marshal Lord Walker of Aldringham showing the Parachute Badge without Wings on his left sleeve

The Parachute Badge with Wings insignia, which depicts an open parachute embroidered in white flanked by a pair of wings embroidered in light blue, is only to be worn by a qualified parachutist who has subsequently been on the posted strength of a unit where they may be ordered in the course of their duties to parachute. Those who do not serve with a parachute unit are permitted to wear the Parachute Badge without Wings, colloquially known as the 'Lightbulb'.

=== Special Forces ===
The parachutist's badges for personnel of the SAS and SBS are of different designs, Special Forces Communicators attached to the SBS wear SBS pattern wings. Special Forces Communicators wings are of a distinct design

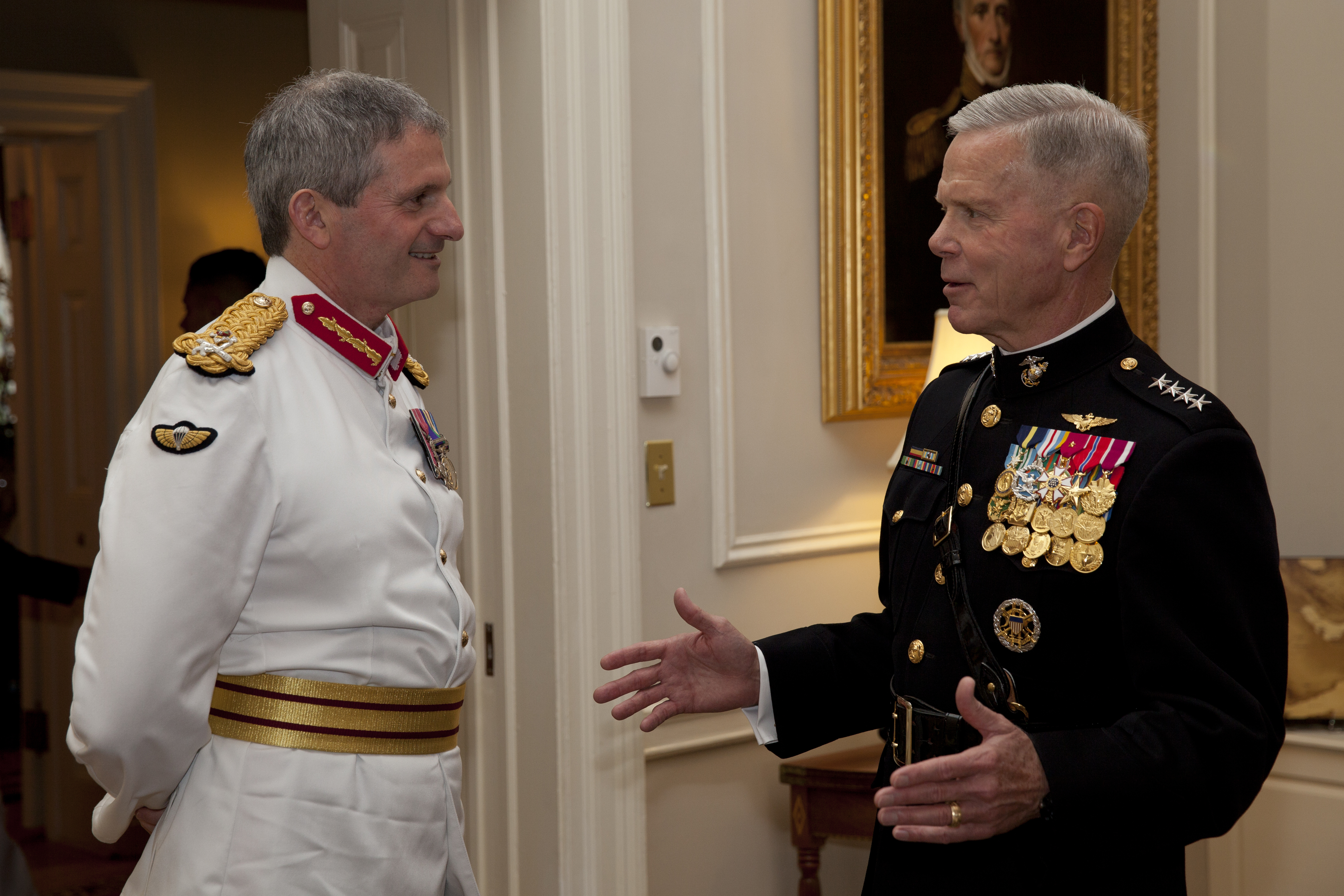
Major General Martin Smith (left) with the SBS parachutist badge on his right sleeve.

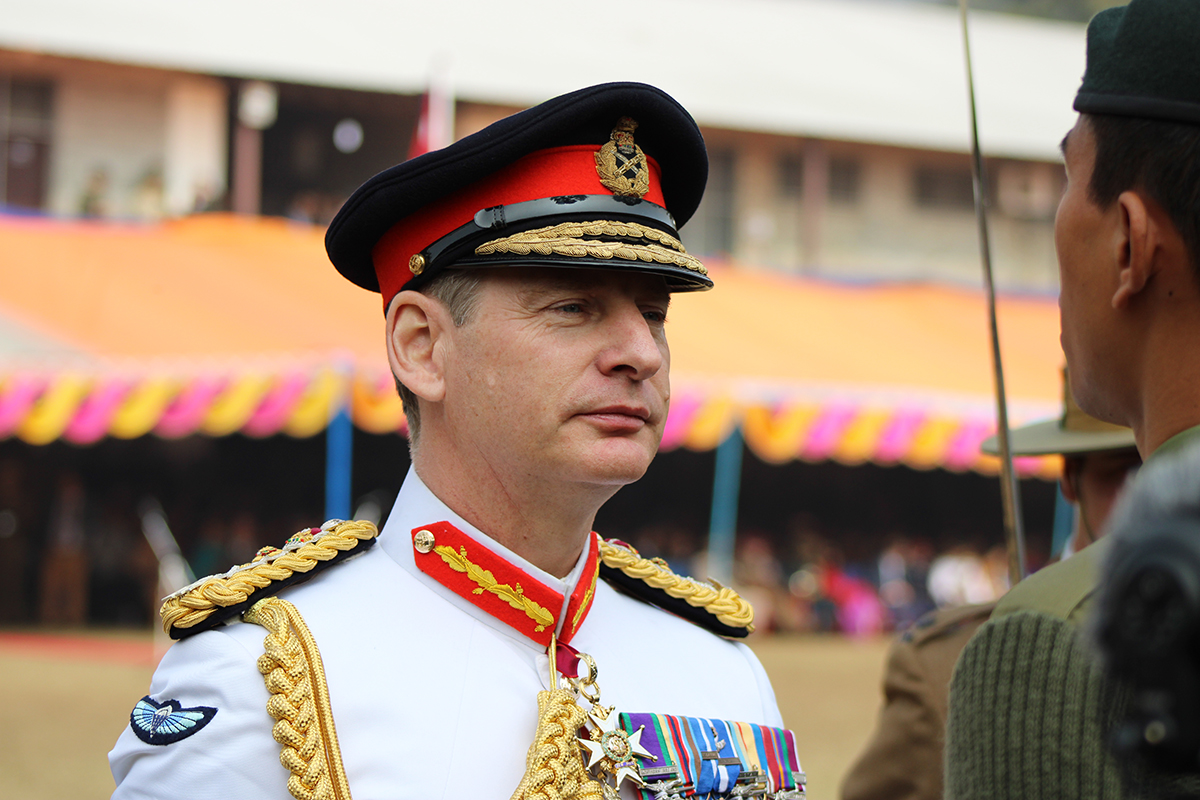
General Sir Mark Carleton-Smith with the SAS parachutist badge on his right sleeve.

SAS pattern parachute wings, designed by Lieutenant Jock Lewes and based on the stylised sacred Ibis wings of Isis of Egyptian iconography depicted in the décor of Shepheard's Hotel in Cairo, are worn on the right shoulder. During the second world war, after a qualifying number of active service "jumps", they were worn on the left breast above medal ribbons.

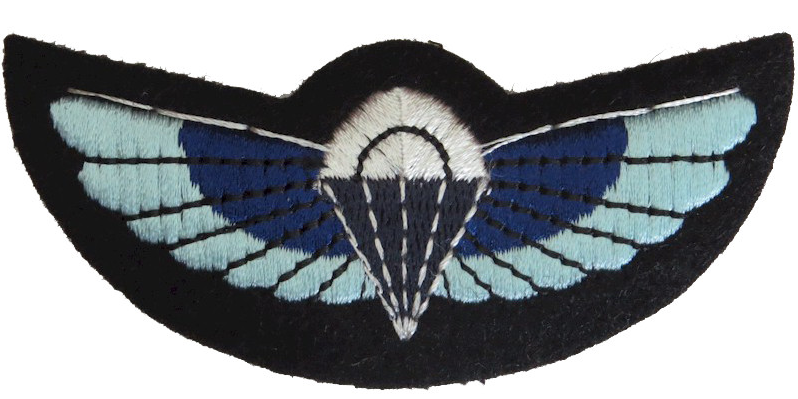
British Army SAS Parachute Badge with Wings

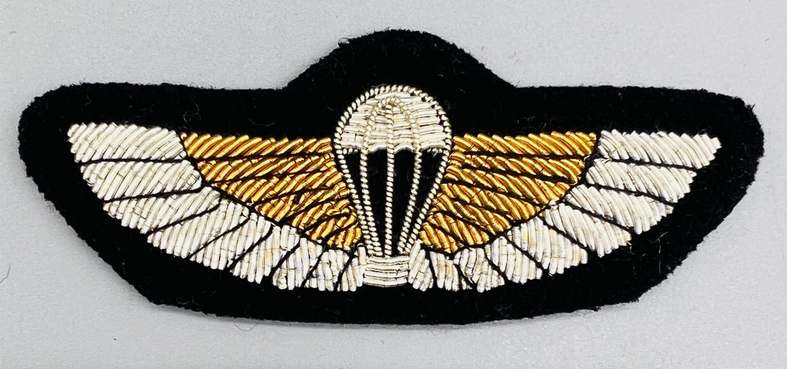
Royal Navy SBS Parachute Badge with Wings

=== RAF ===
Qualified RAF and RAF Regiment personnel wear a badge similar to the Army's Parachute Badge with Wings, formerly on an RAF blue-grey backing, since 1972 on navy blue; there is an RAF equivalent to the 'lightbulb'. The Parachute Jump Instructor badge is categorised as a Flying Badge.

== See also ==
- Parachutist Badge (Malaysia)
- Parachute Regiment (United Kingdom)
- Parachutist Badge (United States)
