= Gurkha Independent Parachute Company =

Unit of the British Brigade of Gurkhas (1963–1971)

- Active: 1 January 1963–1971
- Country: United Kingdom
- Branch: British Army
- Type: Commando Infantry
- Engagements: Indonesia-Malaysia confrontation

The Gurkha Independent Parachute Company was a unit of the British Brigade of Gurkhas.

== Formation ==
This unit was formed from volunteers from all eight regiments and corps units of the Brigade of Gurkhas on 1 January 1963, with the original role of airfield seizure for 17th Gurkha Division, with an all ranks strength of 128 men. Parachute training was conducted in Malaya, with selection carried out at Johore Baru under Captain Bruce Niven of the 10th Princess Mary's Own Gurkha Rifles.

== Operations ==
Under the command of Major Peter Quantrill, 7th Duke of Edinburgh’s Own Gurkha Rifles, the company was initially employed in an infantry role. The company was deployed to Sarawak and split up into groups of two or three with the mission of training and commanding the Border Scouts (which was composed of Iban natives). This was less than successful, due to the inadequacies of the Iban and morale suffered accordingly. After a debacle at the kampong of Long Jawi, the Border Scouts were disarmed and restricted to an information gathering role, which released the company for other duties. It was at this time, Major L. M. 'Phil' Phillips, 10th Princess Mary's Own Gurkha Rifles took command.

The company was concentrated together at Kuching, and operated in the "Fire Brigade" role, moving to wherever it was needed at short notice. It carried out a number of such operations in support of 3 Commando Brigade in the Lundu area.

== Change of role ==
In 1964, the Company returned to the mainland, and was based at the Kota Tinggi Jungle Warfare School in Johor Bahru. Shortly after Major Phillips was informed by the Director of Operations, Borneo that the Company would return to Borneo to operate in the SAS role. Lt. Col. John Woodhouse, Commanding Officer of 22 SAS assisted Major Phillips in planning the conversion of the Company. The Company reorganised from three platoons into 16 five-man patrols (commander, medical orderly, two assault pioneers and a signaller). The reasons behind the adoption of the five man patrol were that company's primary role was still airfield assault, and its strength of 128 all ranks was based on that role.

The company underwent a short period of training and weeding out, assisted by 2 members of 22 SAS. The Signallers were provided by Queen's Gurkha Signals and the patrol medics were trained at the British Military Hospital, Singapore.

== Second tour ==
By August 1964, training was complete, and the attempted invasion of the mainland by Indonesian troops provided a good 'shake down' for the Company. In October 1964, the Company returned to Borneo, where it relieved No.1 (Guards) Independent Company at Sibu. During the next 6 months, the Company patrolled constantly, patrols being rotated to allow them to rest and recuperate at the company base. There were no contacts with the enemy, although a number of unauthorised forays across the Indonesian border were carried out.

In April 1965, the Company returned to the mainland, to a new base at Kluang. Major John Cross assumed command and the company spent the next five months retraining and recruiting new members. In September, the Company returned to Borneo, taking part in Operation Claret, a series of cross-border operations.

In June 1966, the Company was formally affiliated to the Parachute Regiment and its members wore the maroon beret and badge of the regiment, the latter worn on a rifle green backing bearing the colours of the Brigade of Gurkhas.

== The end ==
In 1968, the company reverted to the organization of a conventional rifle company, and its original role of airfield seizure. It was based once more at Kota Tinggi, where it acted as the demonstration company. In 1971 the Brigade of Gurkhas moved to Hong Kong, where no role was envisioned for an airborne unit, consequently, on 31 October, the Gurkha Independent Parachute Company was disbanded.

== Active service ==
Borneo Oct 1964-April 1965, Sept 1965-April 1966.
