= Military badges of Malaysia =

List of Malaysian military badges

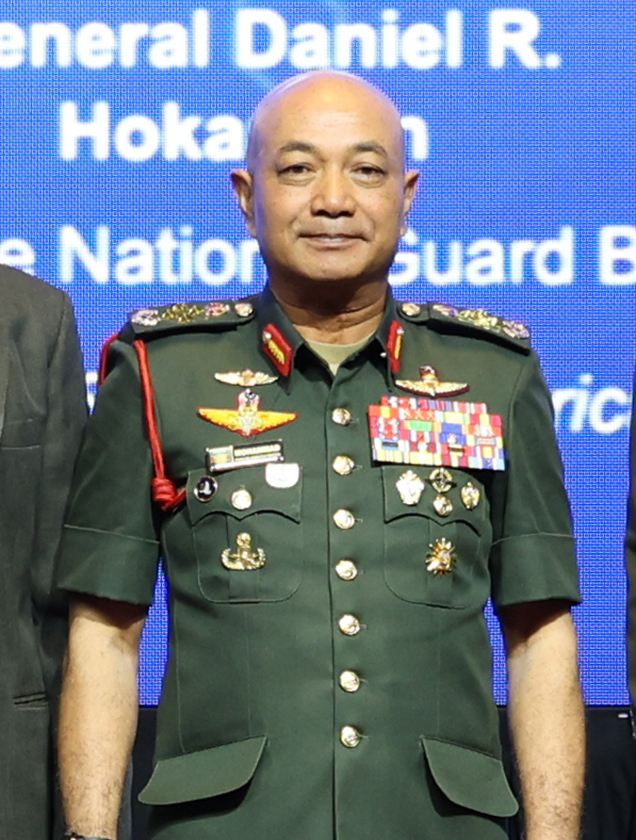
The uniform of General Mohammad Ab Rahman, the 22nd Chief of Defence Force, illustrates the standard arrangement of Malaysian military badges: Primary Qualification Badges (Group 1) are positioned above the ribbon bars on the left breast, while foreign military badges are worn on the right, above the name tag. Secondary Skill Badges (Group 3) are situated on both breast pockets, and notably, Leadership and Prestigious Awards (Group 2) occupy the centre of the left breast pocket.

Military badges of Malaysia are official awards authorised by the Malaysian Armed Forces. These badges signify a service member's qualification (Malay: Kelayakan), trade (Malay: Ketukangan), expertise (Malay: Kepakaran), or specific skills (Malay: Kemahiran). They also serve as identification for personnel holding certain appointments or those who have achieved significant accomplishments.

Badges are typically worn on the left breast of the uniform, though they may be shifted to the right side if a service member has earned a large number of awards. For Royal Malaysian Air Force (RMAF) personnel, the area above the left breast pocket is strictly reserved for RMAF-specific trade badges. These badges are worn alongside Malaysian orders, decorations, and medals on specific numbered uniforms.

In the Malaysian context, the Malaysian Army badges often serve as the standard for the entire MAF and are shared across other branches. This occurs because the Army is the largest branch of the MAF and maintains the most comprehensive training facilities. Most courses offered by the Army are open to personnel from the Royal Malaysian Navy (RMN), the RMAF, and even various government agencies. Despite this general standardisation, the RMN and RMAF maintain a few of their own branch-specific badges that reflect their unique operational environments.

Some of the military badges in Malaysia are organised into a hierarchy of tiers. This ranking is crucial as it determines the specific vertical and horizontal location of the badge on the personnel uniform.

== Malaysian Armed Forces skill badges ==
The Malaysian Armed Forces (MAF) utilise a hierarchical system for the display of skill badges on military uniforms. These badges are divided into three distinct groups, each with specific regulations regarding seniority, placement, and the maximum number of insignia permitted.

=== Group 1: Primary Qualification Badges ===
Group 1 badges represent the highest level of technical and operational qualification within MAF. These insignia are subject to a specific order of precedence that dictates their placement on the service uniform. While the badges themselves are standardised across the forces, the regulations regarding their display vary between the different branches of the service.

For personnel who have earned multiple qualifications within this category, regulations permit the display of only the two most senior badges at any given time.

- Malaysian Army and Royal Malaysian Navy (RMN): These personnel wear Group 1 badges on the left side of the uniform, positioned above the breast pocket and superior to any Malaysian orders, decorations, or medals.
- Royal Malaysian Air Force (RMAF): In contrast, RMAF personnel wear these badges on the right side of the uniform, positioned above the breast pocket and the individual's name tag.

Within the Royal Malaysian Navy, many of these qualifications are officially designated as insignia rather than badges. This terminology reflects the significant influence of United States Navy traditions on RMN uniform regulations.

The following list outlines the seniority of Group 1 primary qualification badges, arranged from highest to lowest:

1. Surface Warfare Officer Insignia (Note: only issued to Royal Malaysian Navy personnel)
2. Aircrew Flying Badge
  1. Pilot
  2. Navigator
  3. Weapon Officer
  4. Aviation Engineer
  5. Air Quartermaster
3. Submarine Warfare Insignia
4. Naval Special Forces (PASKAL) Insignia
5. Combat Diver Badge
6. Clearance Diver Insignia
7. Hydrographic Surveyor Insignia
8. Supply Officer Insignia
9. Aerial Delivery Badge
10. Ammunition And Explosives Disposal Badge
  1. Expert
  2. Senior
  3. Basic
11. Parachutist Badge
  1. Instructor
  2. Jump Master
  3. Free Fall
  4. Senior
  5. Rigger
  6. Basic
12. Professional Engineer (Ir.) Insignia
13. Aircraft Maintenance Engineer Insignia
14. Professional Technologist (Ts.) Insignia
15. Certified Technician (Tc.) Insignia

=== Group 2: Leadership and Prestigious Awards ===
Group 2 badges are subject to seniority regulations and are worn at the centre of the breast pocket. Personnel are permitted to display only one badge from this category at any given time. In cases where an individual holds multiple Group 2 qualifications, the most senior badge must take priority.

1. The Chief of Navy Commendation Badge
2. The Best Sailors Award Badge
3. Malaysian Armed Forces National Resilience College (NRC) Graduate Badge
4. Malaysian Armed Forces Defence College (MAFDC) Graduate Badge
5. Malaysian Armed Forces Staff College (MAFSC) Graduate Badge

=== Group 3: Secondary Skill Badges ===
Group 3 badges do not have a specific internal order of seniority. These insignia are worn on the breast pocket according to a standard format: three badges may be displayed on the pocket flap, while two are placed at the centre of the pocket.

If a Group 2 badge is being worn, it takes precedence at the centre of the breast pocket. If space on the left pocket is insufficient, badges may be moved to the right side of the uniform. A maximum of ten badges, including any Group 2 insignia, may be worn on the uniform simultaneously.

Group 3 badges include:

- Ammunition Technician Badge
- Chemical, Biological, Radiological And Nuclear (CBRN) Specialist Badge
- Electronic Warfare Specialist Badge
- RMAF Certified Flight Instructor Badge (Note: only issued to Royal Malaysian Air Force personnel)
- RMAF Instructor Badge
- RMAF Special Forces (PASKAU) Badge
- RMAF Ground Defence Force (HANDAU) Badge
- Sniper Badge
  - Instructor
  - Basic
- Reconnaissance Badge
  - Instructor
  - Basic
- Pathfinder Parachutist Badge
- RMN Ship Diver Badge
- Mechanised Infantry Badge
- Legal Profession Badge
- Medical Officer Badge
- Registered Nurse Badge
- Artillery Proficiency Badge
  - Senior Officer
  - Instructor
  - Basic
- Infantry Support Badge
  - Instructor
  - Basic
- Foreman of Signals Badge
- Yeoman of Signals Badge
- Military Firefighter Badge
- Physical Training Instructor (PTI) Badge
- Royal Army Engineers Technician Badges
  - Demolition
  - Mechanical Engineering
  - Electrical Engineering
  - Civil Engineering
- REME Technician Badge
- Marksmanship Ace Badge

== Royal Malaysian Navy branch-specific badges ==
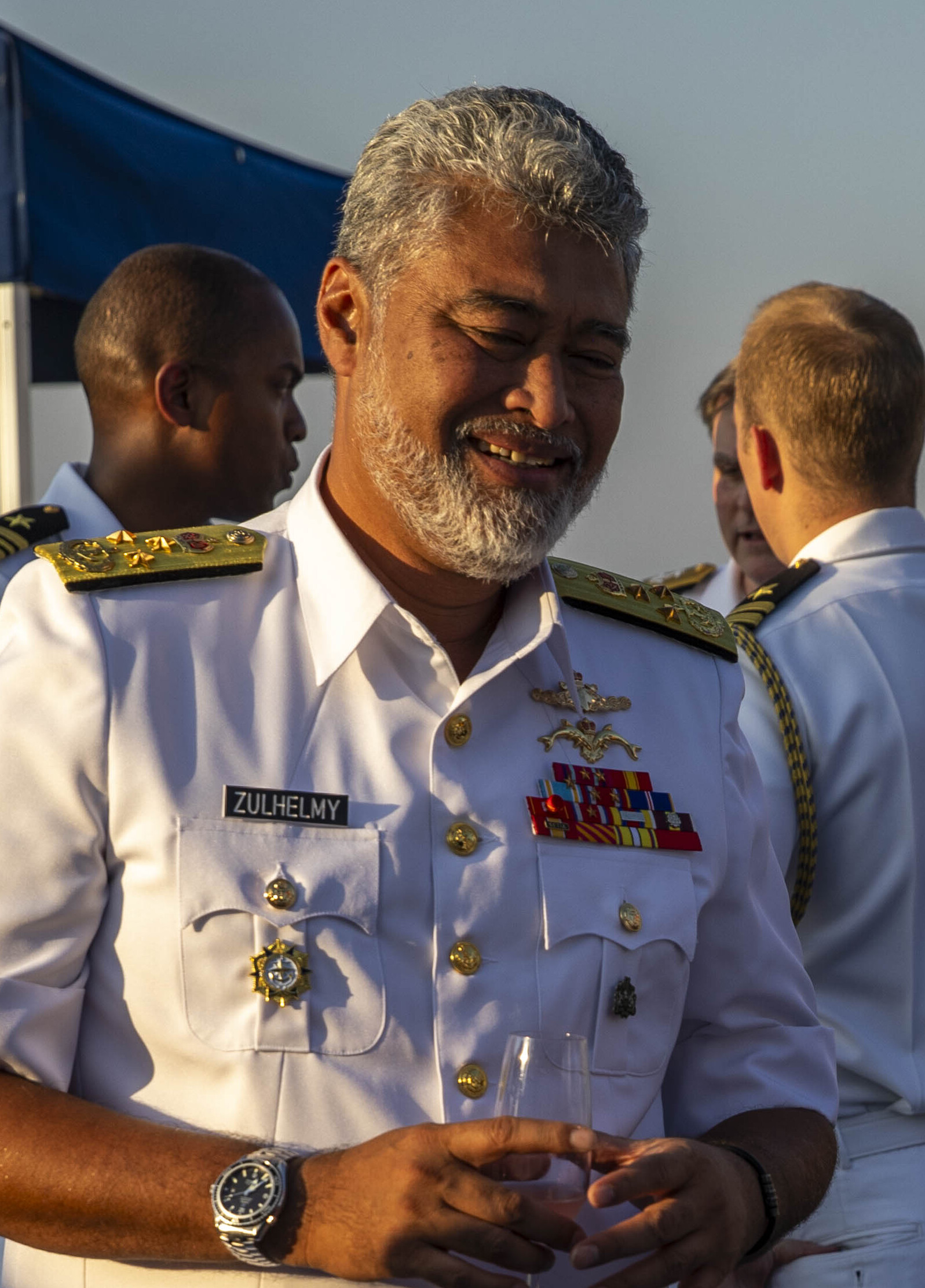
Admiral Zulhelmy Ithnain (then a Vice-Admiral) is depicted in No. 2 Dress. Having qualified in both Surface and Submarine Warfare, he is seen wearing both Group 1 primary qualification badges on the left breast, situated above his ribbon bars.

The Royal Malaysian Navy (RMN) maintains a unique system of branch-specific insignia in addition to standard Malaysian Armed Forces (MAF) skill badges. The RMN also utilises specific badges to identify leadership appointments. Notably, within the RMN, the Surface Warfare Officer Insignia is considered senior to the Aircrew Flying Badge. Like the broader MAF system, these are organised into distinct tiers based on seniority and placement regulations.

=== Command Insignia ===
Unique to the RMN, this group is inspired by the United States Navy Command Insignia. These marks serve to identify officers and senior other ranks who hold or have held significant leadership appointments. The regulations for wearing command insignia depend on whether the individual is currently serving in an active command appointment or has completed their tenure. For personnel currently holding active command appointments, the insignia is worn on the left side of the uniform, positioned directly above the personnel name tag. For personnel who are no longer serving in active command roles but have previously held such appointments, the insignia is moved to the right breast pocket.

Command insignia include:

- Commanding officer insignia
- Warrant Officer of The Navy insignia
- Command warrant officer insignia

== Royal Malaysian Air Force branch-specific badges ==
The Royal Malaysian Air Force (RMAF) maintains a specific system of branch insignia that operates alongside the standard Malaysian Armed Forces (MAF) skill badges. Heavily influenced by the United States Air Force (USAF), the RMAF issues Occupational Badges, locally referred to as Trade Badges (Malay: Lencana Ketukangan), to its personnel.

In a departure from the practices of other Malaysian military branches, these trade badges are considered the most senior insignia within the RMAF. They are given priority in placement and are worn above the left breast pocket, superior to any Malaysian orders, decorations, or medals.

=== Air Force Trade Badges ===
The Air Force Trade Badges, also known as Branch Badges (Malay: Lencana Cawang), signify the core qualification and professional trade of RMAF personnel. There are currently six main categories of trade badges, organised by seniority from highest to lowest. Personnel are permitted to wear only one trade badge at a time, regardless of how many qualifications they may hold.

The order of seniority for RMAF trade badges is as follows:

- Aircrew Flying Badge
- Engineering Branch Badges
- Airspace Management Branch Badges
- Administration Branch Badges
- Material Branch Badges
- Air Force Volunteer Reserve Badges

== See also ==
- Military badges of the United States
