= J. P. Cross =

Former British Army officer (born 1925)

Lt. Col. John Philip Cross OBE (born 21 June 1925) is a former British Army officer and now a writer who currently lives in Nepal. He was educated at Shrewsbury and served in the Brigade of Gurkhas in the British Indian Army and (after Indian independence) the British Army from 1943 to 1982, most of that time in Asia. His first active service was in the Burma Campaign of World War II, against the Japanese. After the Second World War he became heavily involved in counter-insurgency during the Malayan Emergency and the Borneo Confrontation, and later training and recruiting. He is fluent in Nepali.

== Works ==
Cross first published English For Gurkha Soldiers in Singapore in 1955. This and the 1957 second printing were privately published, but in 1962 it was finally made an official HMSO publication and printed again. In 1966 he published Gurkha - The Legendary Soldier, again in Singapore.

Cross has published a number of historical and biographical works.

- English for Gurkha Soldiers, Editions a and 2: Marican Singapore 1956, Edition 3: HMSO 1962
- Gurkha-The Legendary Soldier, (English and Nepali Edition) Donald Moore 1985, for Asia Pacific Press Pte Ltd Singapore [out of print]
- Gurkhas, Donald Moore 1985, Hamish Hamilton, London 1985 [out of print]
- In Gurkha Company, The British Army Gurkhas, 1948 to the present, 31/12/82, Arms and Armour, London 1986 ISBN 0853688656
- Jungle Warfare, Experiences and Encounters, London 1986 ISBN 085368913X
- Whatabouts and Whereabouts in Asia, Serendipity, UK 2003

Autobiographical Trilogy:

- First In, Last Out, An Unconventional British Officer in Indo-China(1945-46 and 1972-76), London 1992 ISBN 0080417876
- The Call of Nepal, London 1996 ISBN 1858450489; Kindle 2007 (Nimble Books) ASIN B003N3V88E
- 'A Face Like a Chicken's Backside' : An Unconventional Soldier in South East Asia, 1948-1971, London 1996 ISBN 1853672394
- Gurkhas at War: The Gurkha Experience in their Own Words: World War II to the Present [1999], (with Buddhiman Gurung) Greenhill Books 2002 ISBN 1-85367-494-X

Historical Novels:

- The Throne of Stone: 1479-1559, Munal Press, Pokhara, Nepal 2000
- The Restless Quest: 1746-1815, Blenheim Press, UK 2011 ISBN 978-1-906302-20-7[out of print]
- The Crown of Renown: 1819-1857-8, Hallmark International Press, UK 2009 ISBN 978-1-906459-33-8 [out of print]
- The Fame of the Name: 1857-1947, Blenheim Press, UK 2010 ISBN 978-1-906302-22-1 [out of print]
- The Age of Rage: 1947-2008, Blenheim Press, UK 2013 ISBN 978-1-906302-24-5 [out of print]
- OPERATION 4 RINGS, Munal Press, Pokhara, Nepal 2012, Hallmark International Press, UK 2017, Now published by Monsoon Books in two volumes
- OPERATION STEALTH, Monsoon Press, UK, 2018 ISBN 978-1-91-204-9783, Monsoon Press, UK, 2018
- OPERATION JANUS, Monsoon Press, UK 2017 ISBN 978-1-9120491-41, -58 e-book
- OPERATION BLIND SPOT, Monsoon Press, UK 2018 ISBN 978-1-91204-932-5
- OPERATION BLACK ROSE, Monsoon Press, UK 2018, Monsoon Press, UK, 2018
- OPERATION RED TIDINGS, Monsoon Press, UK 2021, Monsoon Press, UK 2021
- OPERATION BLOWPIPE, Monsoon Press, UK, 2022, Monsoon Press, UK, 2022
- Gurkha Tales: From Peace and War, 1945-2011, Frontline Books, London 2012 ISBN 978-1-84832-690-3
- It Happens with the Gurkhas Tales from an English Nepali, 1944-2015, The History Press, UK 2016 ISBN 978-0-7509-6636-8

== Personal life ==
Cross was born in London in 1925 and was educated in Shrewsbury, Shropshire.

He has been tee-total since 1960.

Cross struggled with his eyesight losing his sight almost entirely in the early 1980s. He believed that it was as a result of working on short commons with the Temiar Tribe in Malay for such a long period that made him go blind. In 1981 he worked with only one eye for three months until two hours of the other eye not being of any use when he went to Hong Kong to be successfully operated on but warned that his eyesight might be permanently impaired if he hit his head.

Cross is a Christian, and considers himself an honorary Hindu, and an honorary Buddhist, although he put he was an animist on his Nepalese citizenship papers.

A Nepali priest says he is due to live for 110 years because, in 1964, he was twice publicly announced as dead, once by Indonesian Radio 'Pontianak', which also demoted him from Lt Col to Capt, and once by the Sarawak Gazette.

== Military service ==
From 1943 to 1982 (39 years and 80 days), Cross served in the British Army, of which 37 years 324 days were in Asia, mostly with the Gurkhas. He held the rank of major for over twelve years and of lieutenant colonel for over fifteen years and, receiving an MBE, OBE, and appearing on the Army short list three times, of which one appearance is still classified.

== Training ==
In 1943, Cross joined the British Army as private soldier and was promoted to lance-corporal in the Oxfordshire and Buckinghamshire Light Infantry and chosen to go to India for officer training.

In 1944, Cross trained at the Indian Military Academy in Dehra Dun until December of that year when he commissioned as an officer into the Somerset Light Infantry but attached for service with the First Gurkha Rifles. In 1946, after serving in the Anglo-Japanese war, Cross attended and passed a board in Singapore for a regular commission in the British Army.

In 1945, Cross trained for jungle warfare in India and, six weeks before the end of the war, went to a battalion in Burma (1/1 Gurkha Rifles).

1957 Cross took Staff College Entrance Examination and failed (49.8% with a 50% pass mark). The next year he failed again as he drank too much beer before the exam, while on the staff.

== Burma Campaign ==
After seeing the tail end of war in Burma Cross was sent to Cochin-China to disarm the Japanese. In one action he commanded a battalion (Yamagishi Butai) of surrendered Japanese troops against the Vietminh and the Vietminh CO personally surrendered his 300-year-old sword and blade damaged in five places, to him.

Until partition in August, in 1947, Cross operated to keep hostile tribesmen off the government road and preventing them from attacking the army. After partition he moved back into India and was deployed over the Jammu/Kashmir border until December when went to Burma to join British Army Gurkhas.

== Malayan Emergency ==
In 1948 Cross moved from Burma to Malaya where he was until 1959. During this time, he was the chief instructor at the Army School of Education (Gurkhas) in Malaya as which he discovered a Communist-inspired plot to penetrate Gurkhas and disseminate anti-British propaganda from the school.

Between 1951 and 1956, except for one period of UK leave, Cross was commanding a rifle company against the Communist Terrorists on operations in the jungle during this time during which he was recommended for a Military Cross twice and received a Mention-in-Dispatches twice.

He then went to Hong Kong for a 2-year tour. This was the first time there was no need for loaded weapons to be carried (at one time or another during the year) since 1944. In 1959 Cross went around the world on leave travelling in Assam and Nepal before returning to Hong Kong.

Towards the end of 1960 Cross returned to Malaya and started on an unusually demanding series of military operations against the rump of the Malayan Communist Terrorists on the Malay/Thai border. During this time, Cross used a weapon 'for real' every year up till 1976.

Between 1961 and 1963 Cross managed to nullify the effects of what the great Spencer Chapman had instituted with the Chinese Communists 20 years beforehand in relation to the aboriginal population near the Malay/Thai border. With ten Gurkhas, he lived on 1 kg of rations every 5¾ days for 52 days and carried up to 128 lbs. Cross personally managed to win over the Temiar tribe from the Chinese communist guerrillas after the third long operation (the second of 70 days and the third of 80). He was given the name of 'Tata', 'Old Man', an accolade in their society. He accepted for a Malayan decoration by Malayan PM (Ali Menku Negara – the Most Exalted Order of the Realm) but the British Army awarded Cross an MBE instead for his work with the Temiar. Following this, Cross returned to England to recuperate on leave.

== Borneo Confrontation ==
In 1968, whilst in England, Cross was recalled early to be the commandant of the [Borneo] Border Scouts during the Confrontation of Malay/si/a by Indonesia. This too was a most taxing task. Cross was unique as he was a Lt Col in two armies (British and Malaysian) and a Superintendent of three Police Forces (Sarawak Constabulary, Sabah Police Force and the Royal Malaysian Police). He was very nearly decapitated by Iban head-hunters and only narrowly escaped death on a number other of occasions. He was then earmarked to command the Gurkha Independent Parachute Company so, after another spell of leave, he became a parachutist (nearer 40 than 39 years old).

Between 1965 and 1968 Cross commanded the Gurkha Independent Parachute Company and operated over the border of Borneo/ Indonesia during Confrontation (in what is now known as 'in an SAS role'). He was sent on a mission to Sarawak, on the orders of the British PM, with the mother of a dead Marine who was convinced that he was alive. He was then secretly sent up to the area of the aborigines by the Malaysian Police who did not believe what their army told them about the terrorist situation.

== Jungle Warfare School ==
Cross was appointed chief instructor of Jungle Warfare School in 1968 and then commandant for the next until 1971. He ran training for a five-nation exercise that tested the UK, Australia, New Zealand, Singapore and Malaysia how to react to a hostile threat from out of country. Much media coverage ensued, and he was the 'personality spokesman' for the Anglia feature on Jungle Warfare, called The Jungle Fighters for which he was the best-known lieutenant colonel in the British Army at this time, according to the Army Board in the Ministry of Defence.

1971 saw the pull-out from 'East of Suez'. The Jungle Warfare School was to be changed into a five-nation [Australia, New Zealand, Malaysia, Singapore and United Kingdom] Commonwealth Jungle Warfare Centre of which Cross was to have been the senior Briton and the chief instructor. It fell through and he was asked by the Thais to be a major general in their army as the adviser on jungle warfare. The Foreign Office in London had a scheme whereby he was an adviser on jungle warfare to the Thais and the South Vietnamese for six alternating months of each year and the Singapore government put out feelers that Cross raise, train and command a battalion of their commandos. In the event he was warned that he would be an attaché in an Asian country.

In 1972 Cross was warned that he would be the next defence military attaché, with naval representation, in Laos, so he returned to England from Nepal for training, which included 160 hours of French language and 60 hours of Lao language training. At the end of the year he went to Vientiane and took up his duties, which resulted in watching the defeat of the Royalists by the Communists between 1972 and 1976. This was a period quite unlike any Cross had ever witnessed before, despite having been operating against the Malayan Communists (and against the Indonesians whose tactics were similarly based), and teaching about them virtually non-stop since 1948, resulting in him having spent ten years in the jungle. Cross lectured the Royal Lao Army Staff College in Lao and was asked for advice by the minister of defence. For work in Laos, Cross was awarded an OBE, a most unusual event for an attaché, made even more unusual as his assistant was also made MBE. Cross was suggested as attaché to Vietnam or consul in Shanghai however neither eventuated.

== Deputy recruiting officer ==
Between 1976 and 1982 Cross was responsible for recruiting one quarter of the strength of the Brigade of Gurkhas (50% of the western content) and moving the camp from Paklihawa, 200 yards from the Nepal/India border, to the centre of Western Nepal at Pokhara.

Reaching 55 years of age, in 1980 Cross should have retired but was, most unusually, given a 2-year extension. HRH The Prince of Wales visited the recruiting depot in December 1980 and asked Cross what he intended to do after retirement and, on saying he had no idea, HRH said that he would have to find him a job. Cross was offered both CO Gurkha Contingent (Polis Republic Singapura) and Head of Intelligence, Brunei: but declined both.

== Later career ==
In 1982, after an adult lifetime in the Gurkhas, Cross went on pension. Between 1982 and 1986 he attempted his first research project, Nepal's Contribution to The British Army. It was assessed by two Nepalese of a political persuasion that disliked the idea of British Gurkhas and their verdict was that his work was 'without value'. This shattered any hopes of being considered a suitable subject for 'academic' recognition.

Cross was made the official adviser to the International Affairs Section of where he worked (the Research Centre for Nepal and Asian Studies) on the cold war between USSR and PRC in Asia. He has since been a university researcher in Kathmandu (history - British Army Gurkhas and linguistic - comparison of Nepali of today with that of 60+ years ago, for 43 months and 5 days; Cross is the only foreigner ever to be asked for by name and permission given to reside in the country by the king of Nepal.

He is an official historian for the Royal Nepal Army, a title that he was given in 1987, after being asked by the chief of the Army Staff, Royal Nepal Army, to be the director of the Military Boys Campus near Kathmandu.
