= British Gurkhas Nepal =

British Army administrative organisation

British Gurkhas Nepal (BGN) is an administrative organisation responsible for personnel serving with the Brigade of Gurkhas as part of the British Army.

== History ==
Following generations of territorial disputes between the successors of Prithvi Narayan Shah, King of the Gorkha Kingdom, and the East India Company a peace treaty was signed in 1816 which allowed Nepalese nationals to volunteer for service in the East India Company's Army. BGN fell under the responsibility of HQ 4th Division in Aldershot in 2011 when Support Command (now Regional Command) took over that role.

== Operations ==
The mission of BGN is to deliver Gurkha recruitment, provide local support to the soldier and ex-servicemen and maintain Disaster Relief preparedness within resources in order to support Firm Base activity in Nepal. In addition to undertaking recruitment for the British Army, BGN also has responsibility for running the recruitment process for the Gurkha Contingent of the Singapore Police Force.

BGN is commanded by a full colonel, who also serves as the defence attaché at the British Embassy in Kathmandu, and operates from three locations within Nepal:

- Jawalakhel, Patan - just south of the river from central Kathmandu is the location both of Headquarters British Gurkhas Nepal and the Kathmandu station, which is the focal point for organisation of transit to and from Nepal, the welfare of serving soldiers and payment of pensions.
- The British Gurkha Camp in Pokhara is the main recruitment centre, where the annual selection course is run. Pokhara is also the location of the main pension records and houses the headquarters of the Gurkha Welfare Trust.
- British Gurkha Dharan is a small station intended to assist BGN operations in eastern Nepal. It is used primarily as a movement base and regional recruiting centre.
