= Brigade of Gurkhas =

British Army units composed of Nepalese Gurkhas

- Active: 1815–present
- Country: United Kingdom
- Allegiance: King Charles III
- Branch: British Army
- Type: Assault troops
- Role: Land warfare Expeditionary warfare Airborne forces
- Size: ~4090
- Garrison/HQ: Staff College, Camberley
- Nickname: ''The Gurkhas"

Commanders
- Commander-in-Chief: Charles III

Insignia
- Tactical Recognition Flash

Brigade of Gurkhas is the collective name which refers to all the units in the British Army that are composed of Nepalese Gurkha soldiers. The brigade draws its heritage from Gurkha units that originally served in the British Indian Army prior to Indian independence, and prior to that served for the East India Company. The brigade includes infantry, artillery, engineering, signal, logistic and training and support units. They are known for their khukuri, a distinctive heavy knife with a curved blade, and have a reputation for being fierce and brave soldiers.

The brigade celebrated 200 years of service in the British Army in 2015.

== History ==
During the war in Nepal in 1814, Army officers were shocked by the tenacity of the Gurkha soldiers and encouraged them to volunteer for the East India Company. Gurkhas served as troops of the Company in the Pindaree War of 1817, in Bharatpur, Nepal in 1826, and the First and Second Sikh Wars in 1846 and 1848. During the Sepoy Mutiny in 1857, the Gurkha regiments remained loyal to the British, and became part of the British Indian Army on its formation. The 2nd Gurkha Rifles (The Sirmoor Rifles) and the 60th Rifles famously defended Hindu Rao's house.

During the Malayan Emergency in the late 1940s, Gurkhas fought as jungle soldiers as they had done in Burma. The Training Depot Brigade of Gurkhas was established on 15 August 1951 at Sungai Petani, Kedah, Malaya. After the conflict ended, the Gurkhas were transferred to Hong Kong, where they carried out security duties. The troops patrolled the border checking for illegal immigrants entering the territory, most crucially during the turbulence of the Cultural Revolution. They were deployed to contain crowds during the Star Ferry riots of 1966.

After Indian independence and partition in 1947, under the Tripartite Agreement, six Gurkha regiments joined the post-independence Indian Army. Four Gurkha regiments, the 2nd, 6th, 7th, and 10th Gurkha Rifles, joined the British Army on 1 January 1948. The 1st/2nd Gurkha Rifles was deployed to Brunei at the outbreak of the Brunei Revolt in 1962. In 1974 Turkey invaded Cyprus and the 10th Gurkha Rifles was sent to defend the British sovereign base area of Dhekelia. In 1982, during the Falklands War, the 7th Gurkha Rifles formed part of 5 Infantry Brigade and was responsible for capturing Mount William shortly before the Argentinian surrender.

On 1 July 1994, the four rifle regiments were merged into one, the Royal Gurkha Rifles, and the three corps regiments (the Gurkha Military Police having been disbanded in 1965) were reduced to squadron strength. On 1 July 1997, the British government transferred sovereignty over Hong Kong to the People's Republic of China, which led to the closing of the local British garrison. Gurkha HQ and recruit training were moved to the UK. The Royal Gurkha Rifles took part in operations in Kosovo in 1999, in UN peacekeeping operations in East Timor in 2000 and in Sierra Leone later that year.

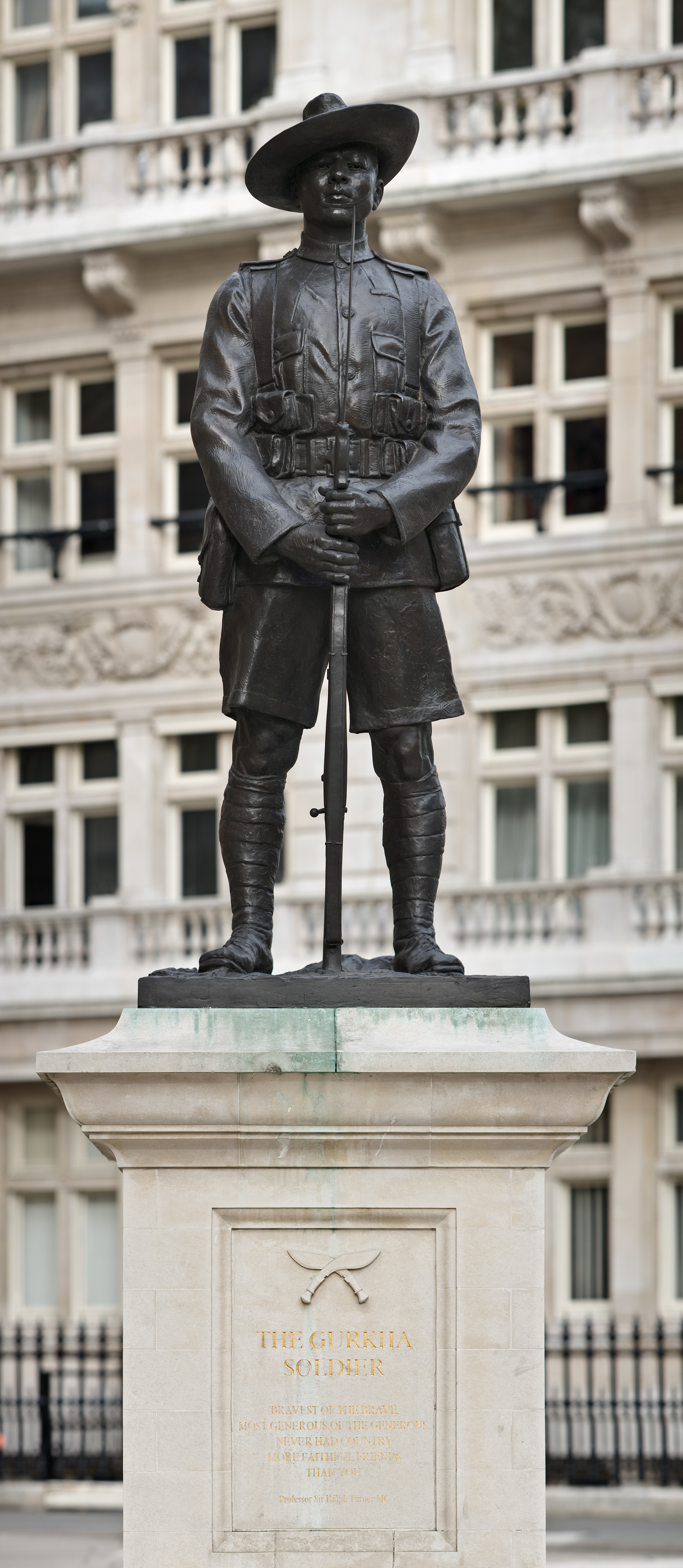
Monument to the Gurkha Soldier stands near the Ministry of Defence in London with an inscription: "Bravest of the brave, most generous of the generous, never had country more faithful friends than you."

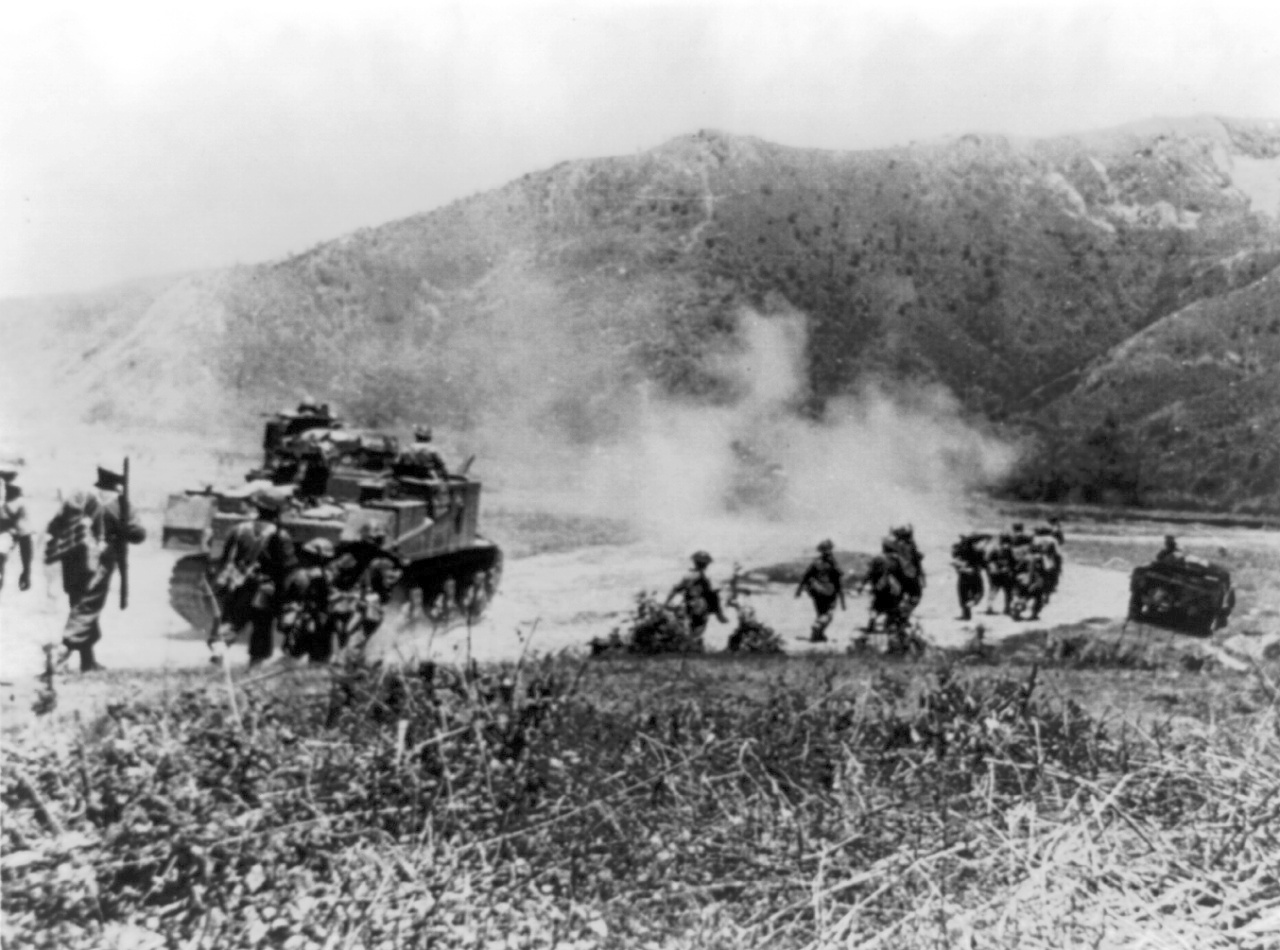
Gurkhas advancing with tanks to clear the Japanese from the Imphal–Kohima road

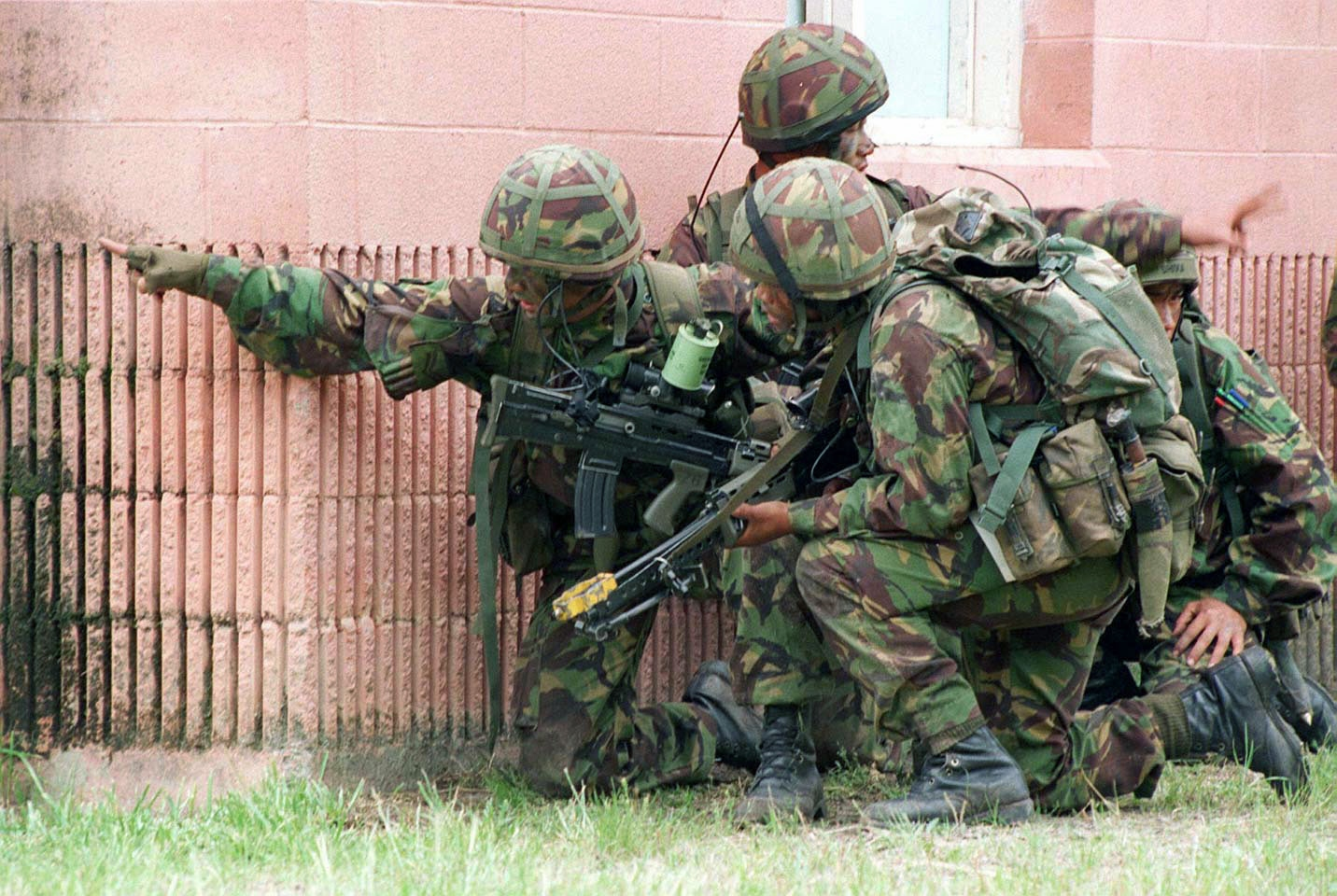
Gurkhas undergoing an urban warfare exercise in the United States. Note the kukri on the webbing of the nearest soldier

In September 2008, the High Court in London ruled that the British Government must issue clear guidance on the criteria against which Gurkhas may be considered for settlement rights in the UK. On 21 May 2009, and following a lengthy campaign by Gurkha veterans, the British Home Secretary, Jacqui Smith, announced that all Gurkha veterans who had served four years or more in the British Army before 1997 would be allowed to settle in Britain.

== British Gurkha units 1947–1994 ==
Former units are:

- 2nd King Edward VII's Own Gurkha Rifles (1947–1994)
- 6th Queen Elizabeth's Own Gurkha Rifles (1947–1994)
- 7th Duke of Edinburgh's Own Gurkha Rifles (1947–1994)
- 10th Princess Mary's Own Gurkha Rifles (1947–1994)
- Gurkha Army Service Corps (1958–1965)
- Gurkha Transport Regiment (1965–1992)
- Queen's Gurkha Engineers (1977–present)
  - Gurkha Engineer Training Squadron, Royal Engineers (1948–1951)
  - 50th (Gurkha) Engineer Regiment, Royal Engineers (1951–1955)
  - Gurkha Engineers (1955–1977)
- Queen's Gurkha Signals (1977–present)
  - Gurkha Signals (1948–1949)
  - Gurkha Royal Signals (1949–1954)
  - Gurkha Signals (1954–1977)
- Gurkha Provost Company, Royal Military Police (1949–1957)
- 17th Gurkha Divisional Provost Company, Royal Military Police (1957–1969)
- Gurkha Independent Parachute Company, Parachute Regiment (c. 1960 – 1970)

== Current organisation ==
=== Overview ===
Brigade HQ is based at the former Staff College, Camberley. Two battalions of the Royal Gurkha Rifles are formed as light role infantry; they are not equipped with either armoured or wheeled vehicles. The 1st Battalion, Royal Gurkha Rifles is based at the British garrison in Brunei as part of Britain's commitment to maintaining a military presence in SE Asia. The 2nd Battalion, Royal Gurkha Rifles is based at Shorncliffe Army Camp, near Folkestone in Kent as part of 16 Air Assault Brigade, and is available for deployment to most areas in Europe and Africa. The 3rd Battalion, to be stationed at Aldershot, is approximately half the size of the others, and is a so-called 'specialised infantry' battalion, serving in the training role as part of the Specialised Infantry Group.

=== Deployments ===
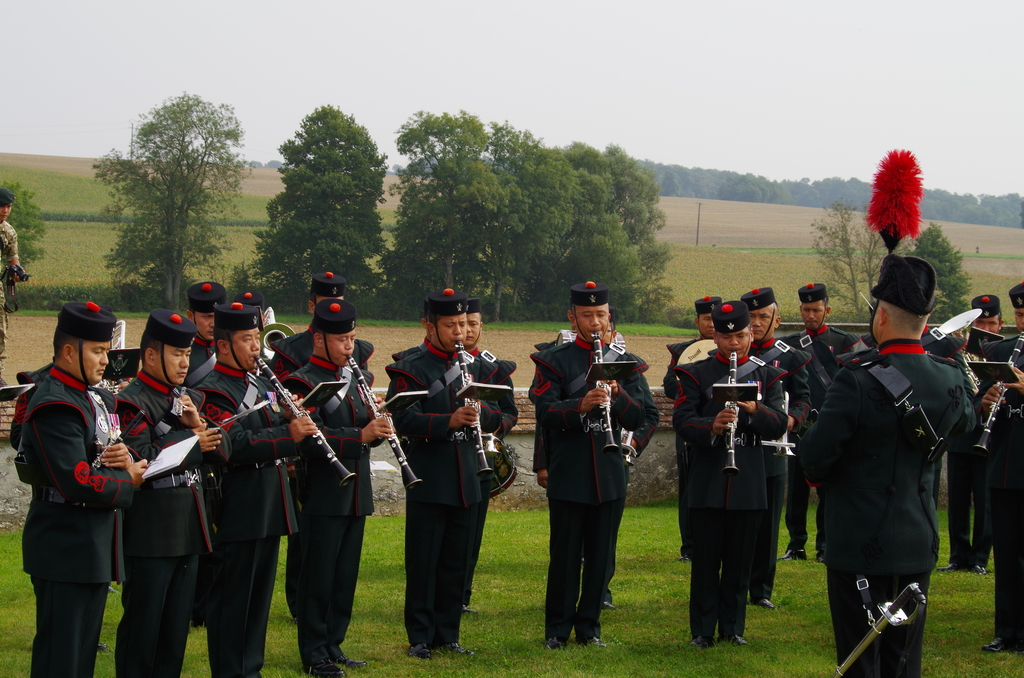
Band of the Brigade of Gurkhas performing in France, 2014

The Brigade of Gurkhas presently includes the following units:

- HQ, Brigade of Gurkhas, at the former Staff College, Camberley in Surrey
  - Queen's Gurkha Signals
    - 242 Squadron (part of 22 Signal Regiment), in Stafford
    - 243 Squadron (part of 15 Signal Regiment)
    - 246 Squadron (part of 1 Signal Regiment)
    - 247 Squadron (part of 16 Signal Regiment)
    - 248 Squadron (part of 22 Signal Regiment), in Stafford
    - 249 Squadron (part of 3rd (UK) Division HQ and Signal Regiment), in Bulford
    - 250 Squadron (provides command support to Commander Joint Forces Operation and his Staff when deployed), in Bramcote
    - Brunei Signal Troop, in Brunei supporting British Forces Brunei
    - Nepal Signal Troop, in Kathmandu supporting HQ British Gurkhas Nepal
  - Royal Gurkha Rifles
    - 1st Battalion, Royal Gurkha Rifles in Brunei – a light infantry battalion, part of British Forces Brunei
    - 2nd Battalion, Royal Gurkha Rifles in Shorncliffe – an air assault infantry battalion, part of 16 Air Assault Brigade
    - A (Krithia) Company, Royal Gurkha Rifles in Belfast – a special operations infantry company (part of 1st Battalion, Ranger Regiment)
    - G (Coriano) Company, Royal Gurkha Rifles in Aldershot – a special operations infantry company (part of 4th Battalion, Ranger Regiment)
    - F (Falklands) Company, Royal Gurkha Rifles in Aldershot – a special operations infantry company (part of 2nd Battalion, Ranger Regiment)
  - Queen's Gurkha Engineers
    - 67 Gurkha Field Squadron, in Maidstone
    - 69 Gurkha Field Squadron, in Maidstone
    - 70 Gurkha Field Support Squadron, in Maidstone
  - King's Gurkha Artillery in Larkhill
  - 10th Queen's Own Gurkha Logistic Regiment RLC, in Aldershot
  - Gurkha Allied Rapid Reaction Corps Support Battalion (Note: Established in 1993 as Headquarters Allied Rapid Reaction Corps Support Battalion, for many years it included numbers of Gurkhas. In August 2021, the battalion added the subtitle 'Gurkha', and is now officially subsumed into the Brigade of Gurkhas.)
  - British Gurkhas Nepal – recruits for the British Army and the Gurkha Contingent of the Singapore Police Force, handles soldier and ex-soldier welfare
  - Gurkha Staff and Personnel Support Company – administration for all Brigade of Gurkhas units
  - Band of the Brigade of Gurkhas (raised in November 1859, then in 1st Gurkha Rifles)
  - Gurkha Company (Babaji) at the Infantry Training Centre, Catterick
  - Gurkha Company (Sittang) at the Royal Military Academy Sandhurst
  - Gurkha Company (Mandalay) at the Infantry Battle School, Brecon
  - Gurkha Training Support Company (Tavoleto) at Waterloo Lines, Warminster
  - Brigade Training Team
  - Nepali Language Wing, Catterick

In 2018, the UK Government announced that it intended to expand the brigade by more than 800 posts, with the Queen's Gurkha Engineers receiving an additional squadron, while the Queen’s Gurkha Signals and the Queen's Own Gurkha Logistic Regiment will receive two new squadrons. Additionally, approximately 300 new posts within the Royal Gurkha Rifles will be created forming a new battalion planned for the Specialist Infantry role. In 2018, it was announced that from 2020, female applicants would be able to apply to join the Gurkhas. However, this decision was reversed in 2019.

In April 2025, the UK government announced a further increase by creating a new artillery regiment within the brigade, bearing the name the King's Gurkha Artillery. As with other Gurkha units affiliated to the support arms and services, the King's Gurkha Artillery will have its own unique cap badge combining elements that illustrate its Gurkha heritage and the heritage of its parent unit, in this case the Royal Artillery. The creation of the King's Gurkha Artillery will mark the first time that Gurkhas have served in their own dedicated artillery unit in the British Army. (Note: Although the King's Gurkha Artillery is the first dedicated Gurkha artillery regiment, Gurkhas have previously served in the artillery role during their time in the British Army. Following the transfer of Gurkha regiments after Indian independence, it was decided to bring all Gurkha units under the command of a single, all-arms division. This led to the two battalions of the 7th Gurkha Rifles being selected for conversion to artillery as 101 and 102 Field Regiments, Royal Artillery. But, owing to the need for experienced infantry soldiers trained in jungle warfare as a result of the Malayan Emergency, the two regiments were re-roled back to infantry after just a year.)

== Recruitment ==
The selection process for the Gurkhas is demanding: in 2017, 230 trainee riflemen were recruited from about 25,000 applicants. Recruitment is run by British Gurkhas Nepal; based at Jawalakhel, near Kathmandu, the main recruiting centre is in the city of Pokhara. Recruitment sees the prospective soldier undergo two stages of selection; first the regional selection at either Pokhara or Dharan, where the recruit undertakes a series of physical tests, written English and numeracy assessments, and an interview. Those that pass regional selection move forward to the central selection process in Kathmandu, which sees further physical and language tests, a medical and a second interview.

Training for Gurkhas is conducted at the Infantry Training Centre at Catterick Garrison in North Yorkshire. It lasts for 36 weeks and addresses a range of areas such as the Brigade ethos, language training, cultural training, career management and trade selection, as well as the same 26-week Combat Infantryman's Course that the Line Infantry receive. This enables the trained Gurkha soldiers to fulfill their roles on operations and continue the traditions of their forefathers.

In addition to running recruitment of soldiers to join the British Army, British Gurkhas Nepal also runs the recruitment process for the Gurkha Contingent of the Singapore Police Force. Recruits indicate at the registration stage whether they wish to join the Singapore Police or the British Army.

Although all enlisted Gurkha soldiers are recruited from Nepalese citizens in Nepal, officers in the Brigade are either selected from those who have distinguished themselves in the ranks, or are commissioned from British or Commonwealth cadets at the Royal Military Academy Sandhurst. Officers from Sandhurst attend an intensive language course at Pokhara Camp to enable them to converse with their soldiers in the Nepali language, although Gurkha soldiers are also expected to learn English.

== Commemorations ==
=== London ===
The Gurkha Memorial was unveiled by Queen Elizabeth II on 3 December 1997. The inscription on the monument is a quotation from Sir Ralph Lilley Turner, a former officer in the 3rd Gurkha Rifles. It reads, "Bravest of the brave. Most generous of the generous. Never had country more faithful friends than you".

=== Bicentennial anniversary ===
A series of events took place in 2015 to mark 200 years of Gurkha service in the British Army including a march past Buckingham Palace.

== Status under international law ==
According to Protocol 1 of the Geneva Conventions of 1949, Gurkhas serving as regular uniformed soldiers are not mercenaries. According to Cabinet Office official histories (Official History of the Falkland Islands by Sir Lawrence Freedman), Sir John Nott, as Secretary of State for Defence, expressed the British Government's concern that the Gurkhas could not be sent with the task force to recapture the Falkland Islands because it might upset the non-aligned members of the fragile coalition of support that the British had built in the United Nations. The then-Chief of Defence Staff Sir Edwin Bramall, a former officer in the 2nd Gurkhas like Nott, said that the Gurkhas were needed for sound military reasons (as a constituent part of 5th Infantry Brigade) and if they were not deployed then there would always be a political reason not to deploy Gurkhas in future conflicts. So he requested that Nott argue the case in Government for deploying them against the advice of the Foreign Office. Nott agreed to do so, commenting that the Gurkhas "would be mortified if we spoilt their chances [of going]".

== Alliances ==
- Australia – The Royal Australian Regiment
- New Zealand – The Royal New Zealand Infantry Regiment
- Brunei – The Royal Brunei Land Force

== See also ==
- History and origin of Gurkha regiments
- List of military operations involving Gurkhas
- Queen's Truncheon equivalent of and carried as the Colour.
- Gorkha regiments (India)
- Gurkha Contingent (Singapore Police Force)
- Gurkha Reserve Unit (Brunei)

== Footnotes ==
Notes

Citations
