= Helipad =

Landing area or platform for helicopters

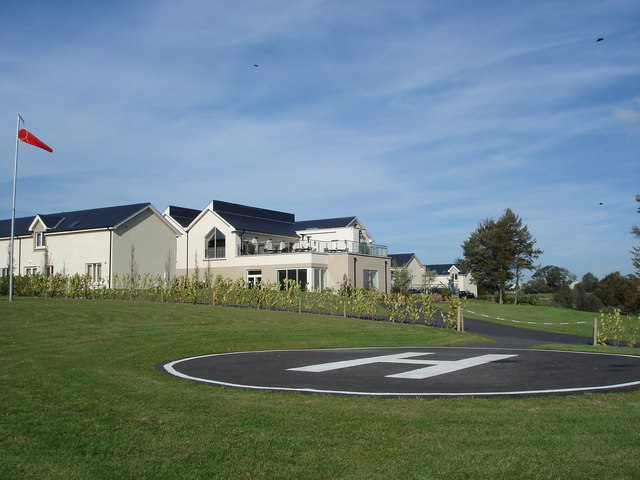
A helipad in Ireland

Helipad area scheme

A helipad is the landing area of a heliport, in use by helicopters, powered lift, and vertical lift aircraft to land on surface.

While helicopters and powered lift aircraft are able to operate on a variety of relatively flat surfaces, a fabricated helipad provides a clearly marked hard surface away from obstacles where such aircraft can land safely.

Larger helipads, intended for use by helicopters and other vertical take-off and landing (VTOL) aircraft, may be called vertiports. An example is Vertiport Chicago, which opened in 2015.

== Usage ==
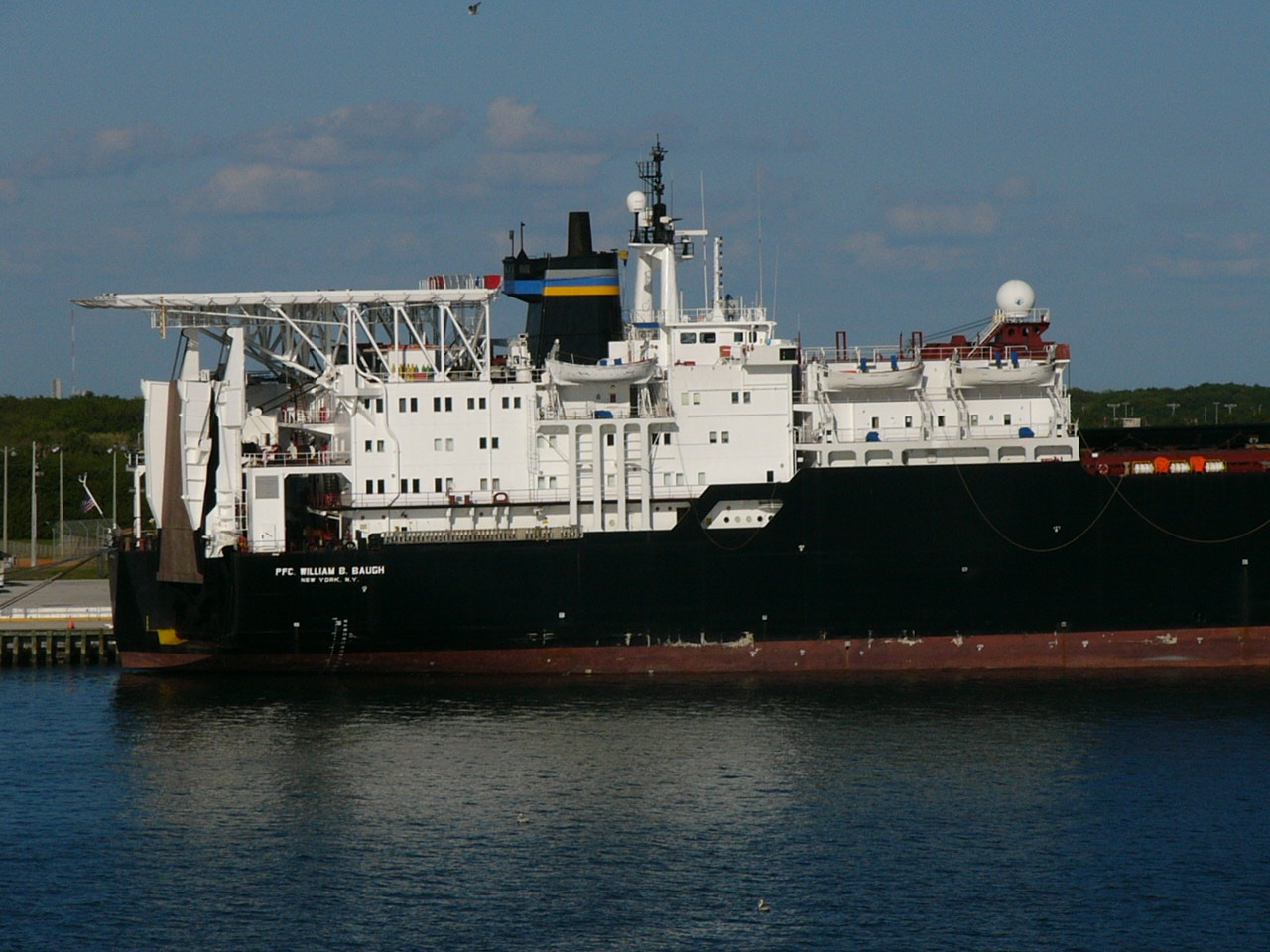
There is a helipad in the back of this U.S. Navy Strategic Sealift Ship.

Helipads may be located at a heliport or airport where fuel, air traffic control and service facilities for aircraft are available.

Most helipads are located away from populated areas due to sounds, winds, space and cost constraints. Some skyscrapers have one on their roofs to accommodate air taxi services. Some basic helipads are built on top of highrise buildings for evacuation in case of a major fire outbreak. Major police departments may use a dedicated helipad at heliports as a base for police helicopters.

Large ships and oil platforms usually have a helipad on board for either emergency use or as standard preferred means of boarding and offboarding. In such a case, the terms "helicopter deck", "helideck", or "helodeck" are used.

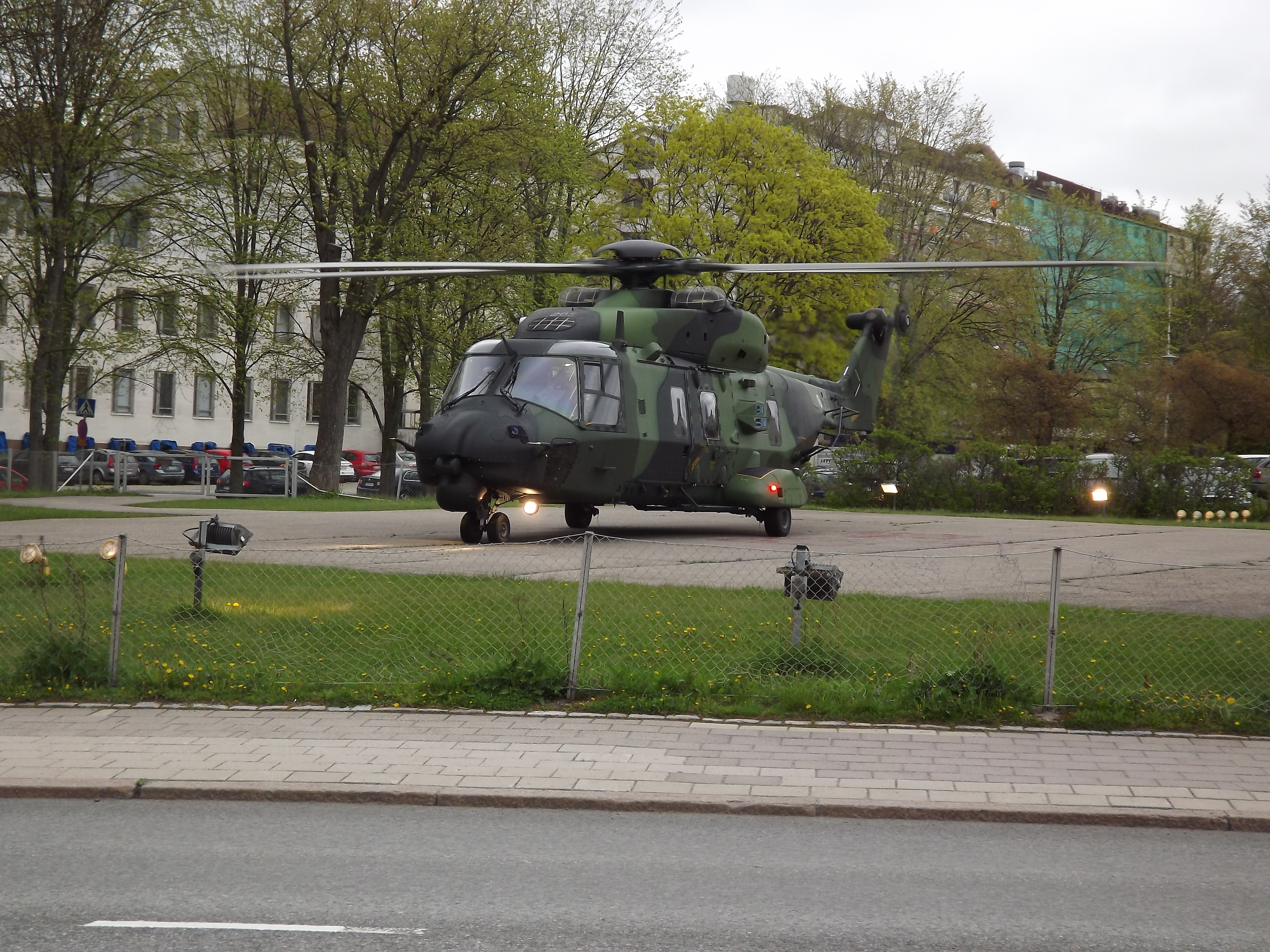
An NHI NH90 (NH205) helicopter of the Finnish Army on the helipad of the Turku Central Hospital during an exercise

Helipads are common features at hospitals where they serve to facilitate medical evacuation or air ambulance transfers of patients to trauma centers or to accept patients from remote areas without local hospitals or facilities capable of providing the level of emergency medicine required. In urban environments, these heliports are sometimes located on the roof of the hospital.

Rooftop helipads sometimes display a large two-digit number, representing the weight limit (in thousands of pounds) of the pad. A second number may be present, representing the maximum rotor diameter in feet.

Location identifiers are often, but not always, issued for helipads. They may be issued by the appropriate aviation authority. Authorized agencies include the Federal Aviation Administration in the United States, Transport Canada in Canada, the International Civil Aviation Organization, and the International Air Transport Association. Some helipads may have location identifiers from multiple sources, and these identifiers may be of different format and name.

== Construction ==
Helipads are usually constructed out of concrete and are marked with a circle and/or a letter "H", so as to be visible from the air. Sometimes wildfire fighters will construct a temporary one from timber to receive supplies in remote areas. Rig mats may be used to build helipads. Landing pads may also be constructed in extreme conditions such as on ice.

The world's highest helipad, built by India, is located on the Siachen Glacier at a height of 21,000 feet (6400 m) above sea level.

== Portability ==
A portable helipad is a helipad structure with a rugged frame that can be used to land helicopters in any areas with slopes of up to 30 degrees, such as hillsides, riverbeds and boggy areas. Portable helipads can be transported by helicopter or powered-lift to place them where a VTOL needs to land, as long as there are no insurmountable obstructions nearby.

== Gallery ==
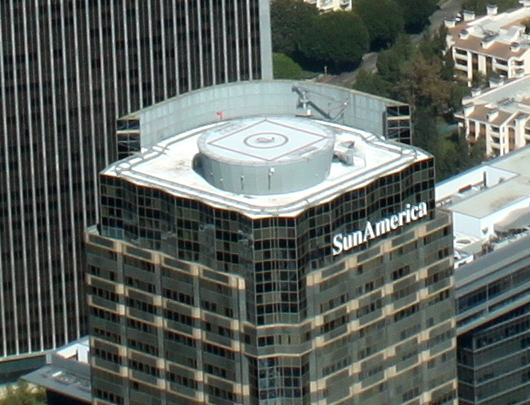
Helipad atop the SunAmerica Center in Century City, California, USA

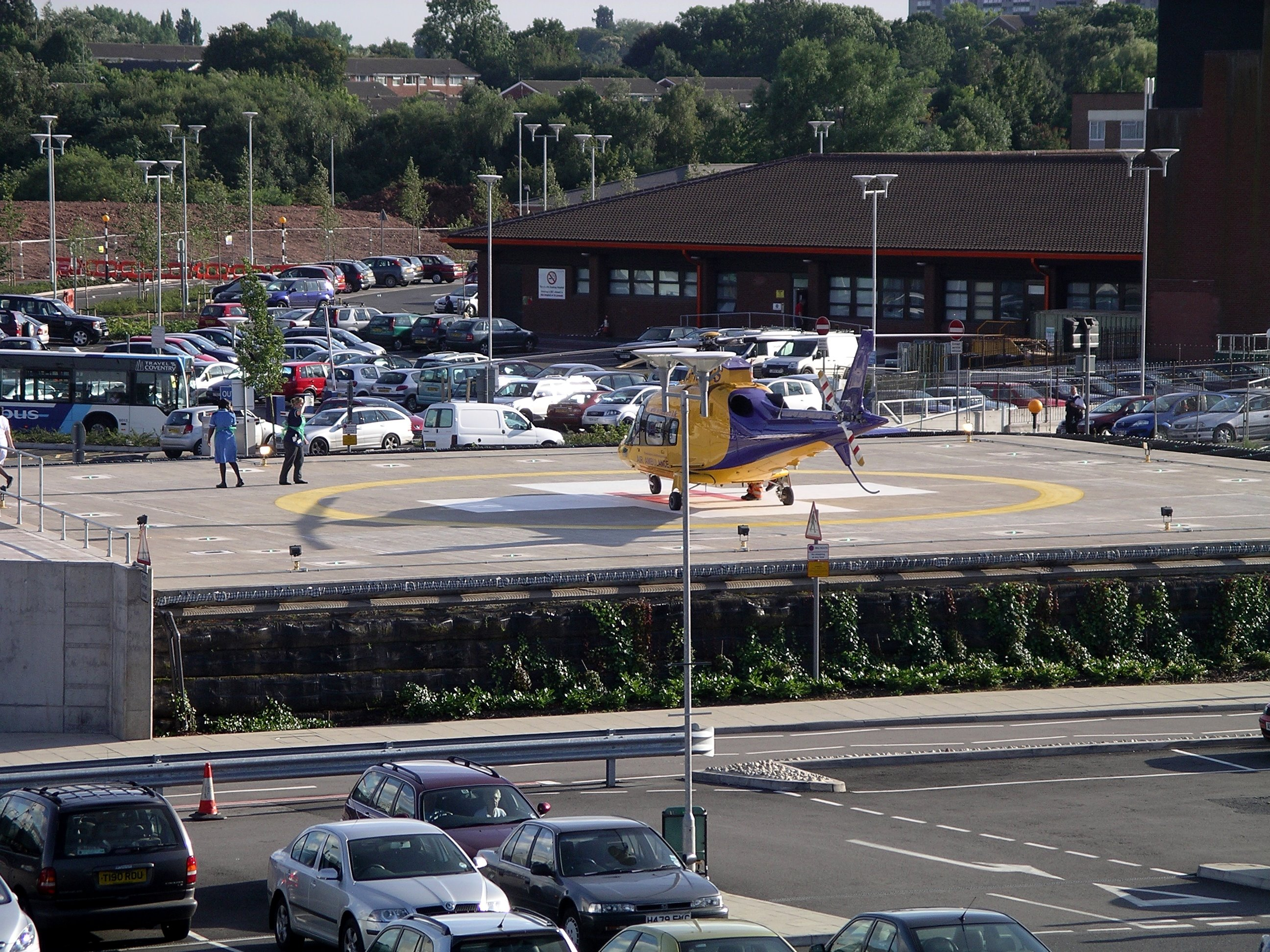
The main helipad at University Hospital Coventry in England

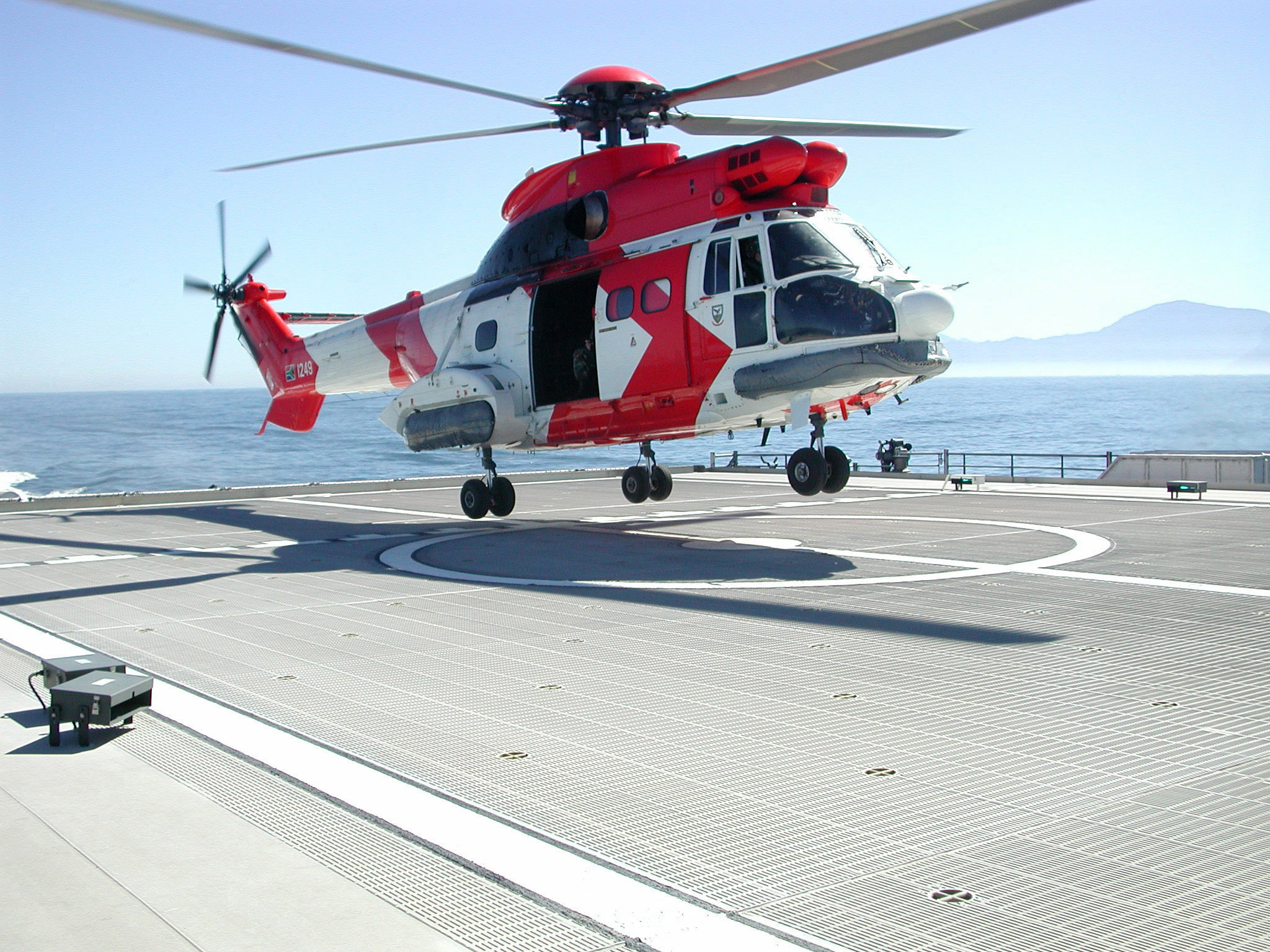
A helicopter touches down on a helideck on board the High Speed Vessel Swift

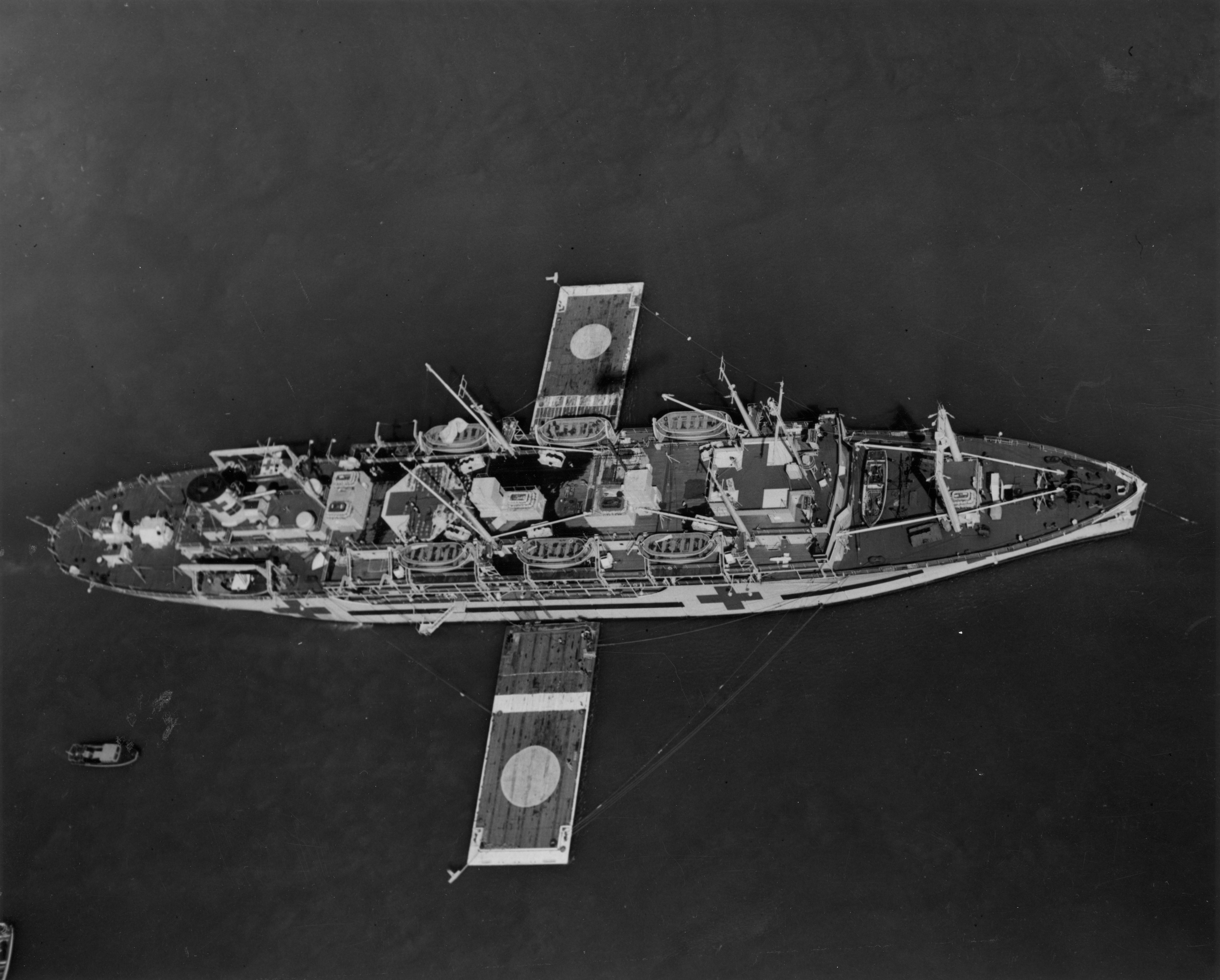
Floating helipads of the American hospital ship USS Haven (AH-12) waiting for helicopters to bring in Korean War wounded.

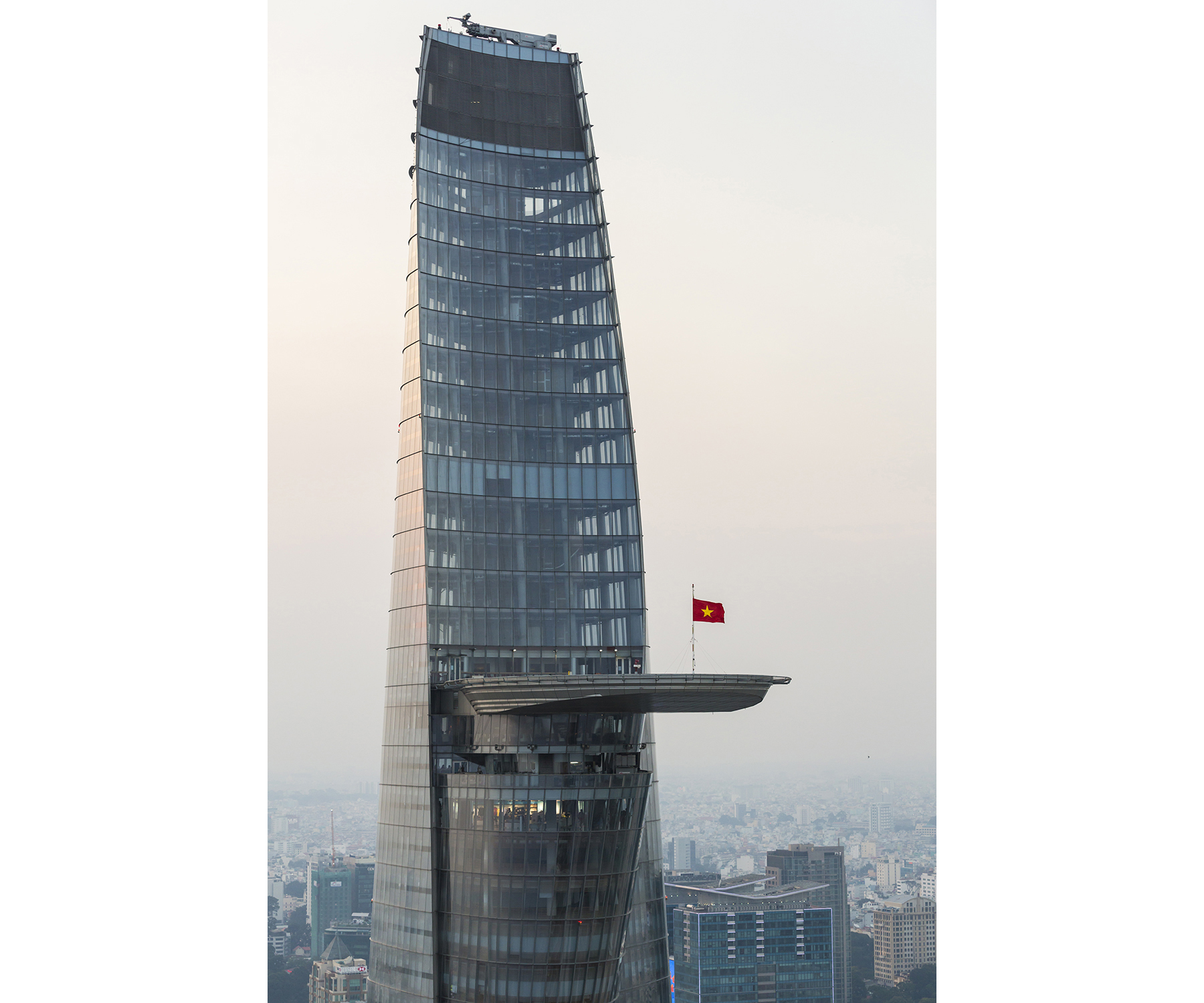
Bitexco Financial Tower Helipad, Ho Chi Minh, Vietnam

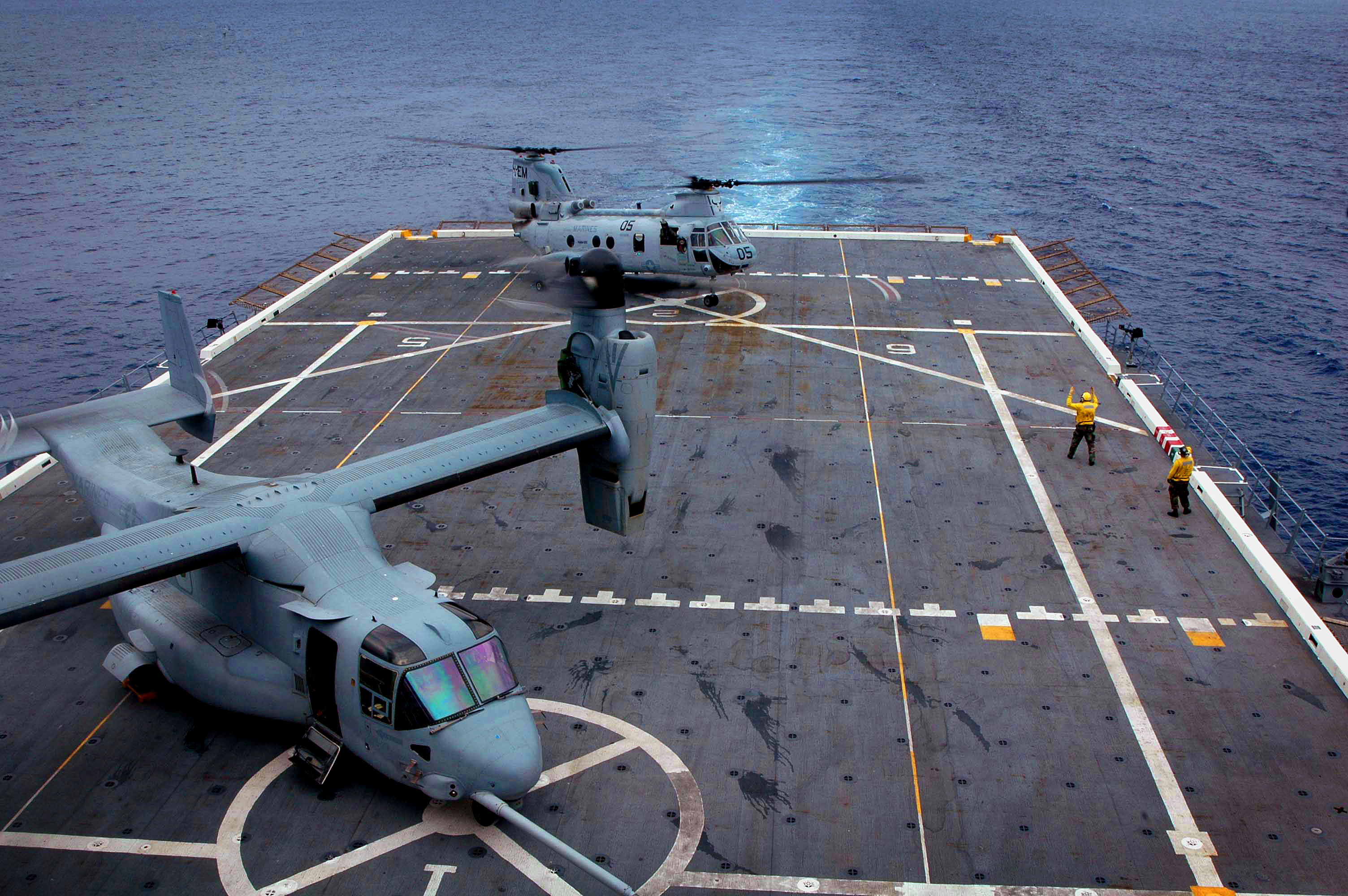
Helipads on the flight deck of USS San Antonio

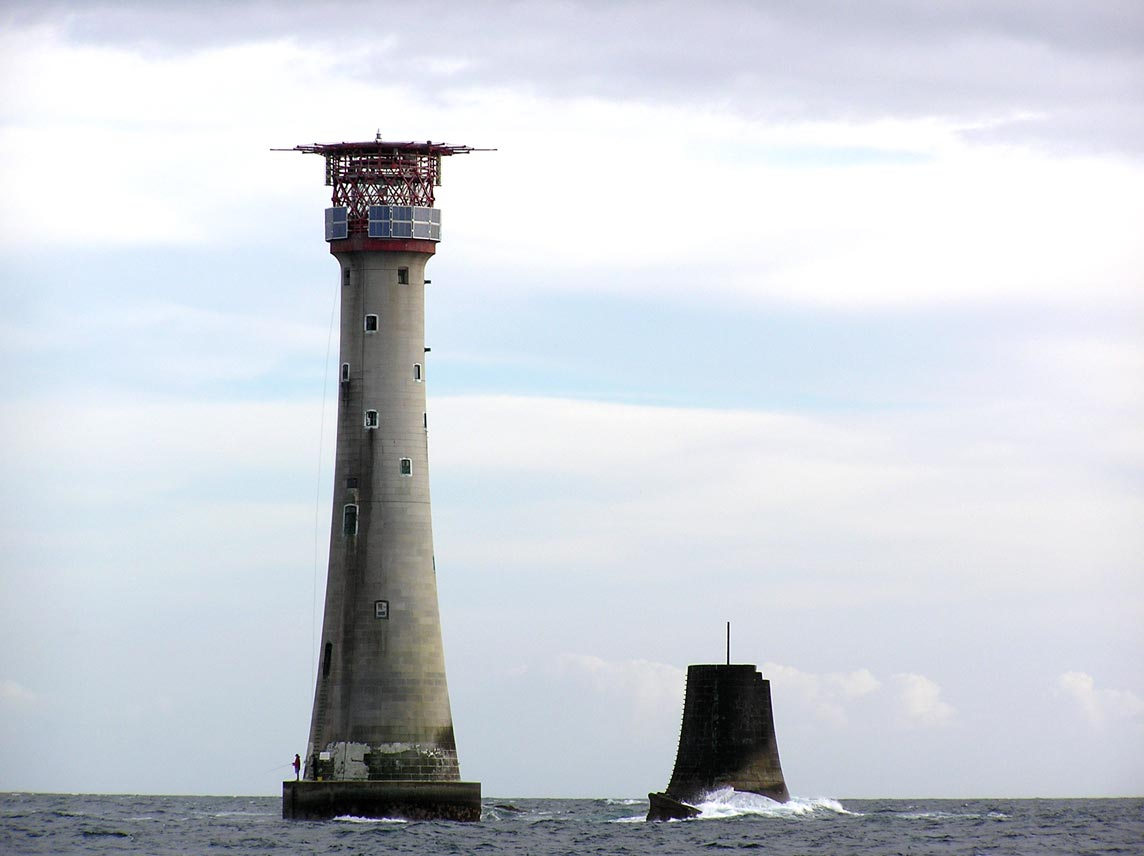
Helipad atop the Eddystone Lighthouse offshore Rame Head

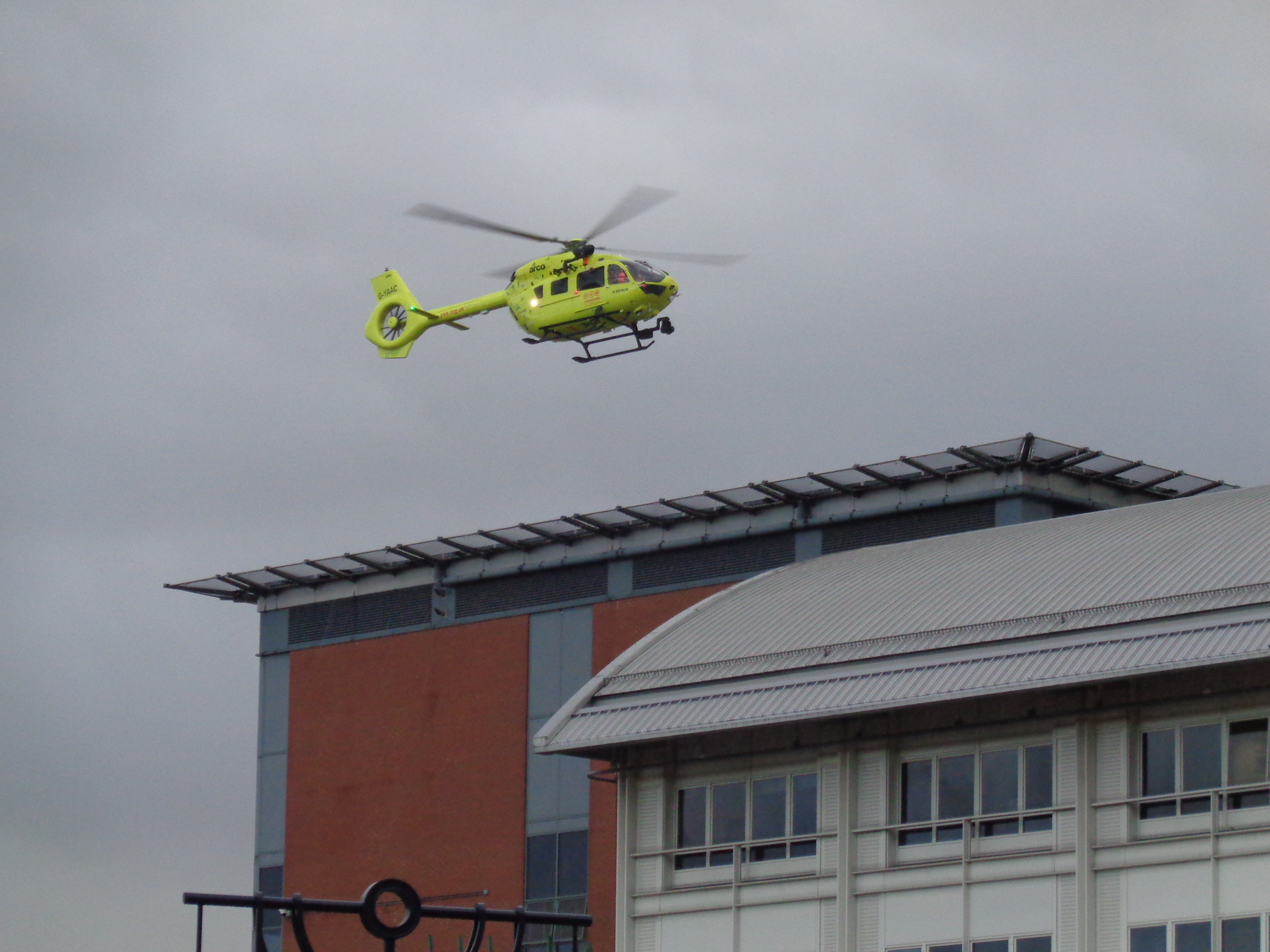
Yorkshire Air Ambulance helicopter landing on the roof of the Leeds General Infirmary

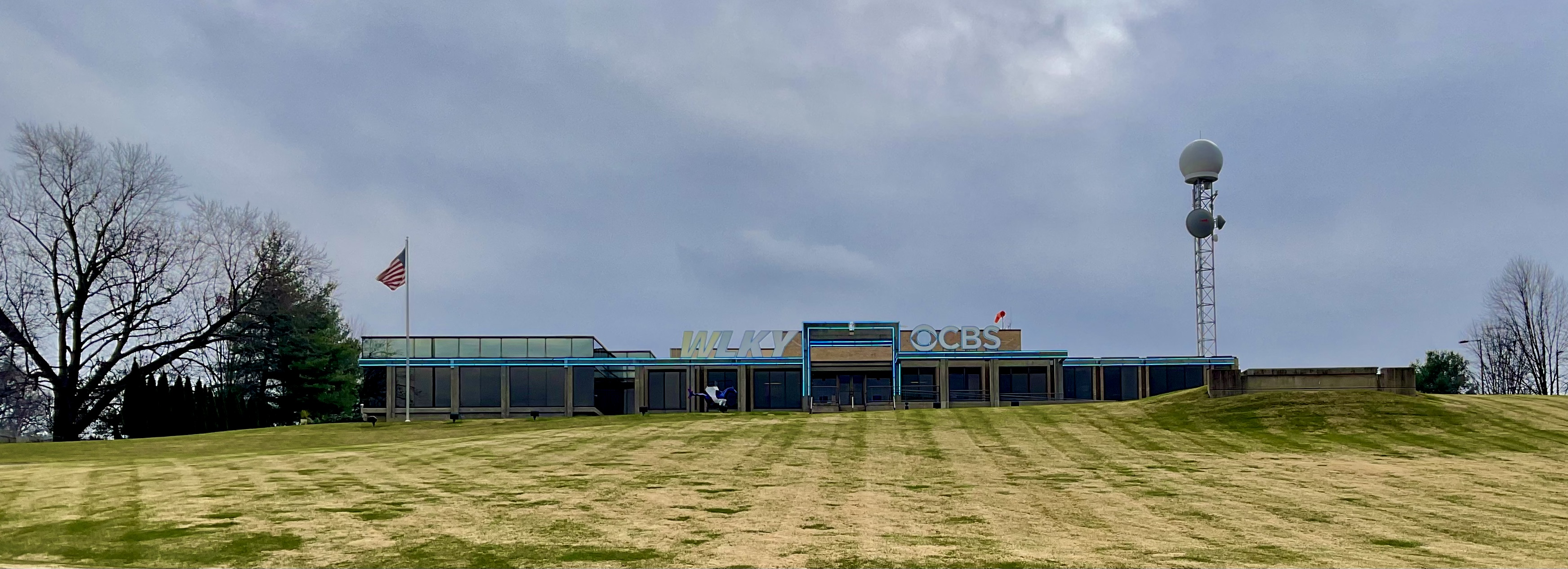
An example of a banked helipad (right) on the property of WLKY, a television station in Louisville, Kentucky, to allow its news helicopter to land on what is otherwise a steep hill sloping downwards towards the Ohio River front below.

== See also ==
- Helicopter landing officer
- Helicopter deck
- Heliport

== Bibliography ==
- de Voogt, A.J. 2007. Helidrome Architecture. Rotterdam: 010 Publishers.
- ICAO 1995. Heliport manual. Montreal, Canada: ICAO Publications.
