= Helicopter landing officer =

Responsible person on an offshore facility

The helicopter landing officer, also known as HLO, is a person on an offshore facility responsible for landing incoming helicopters safely. It is the most vital part of the operating team for an offshore helideck, a purpose-built helicopter landing area, usually on a ship or offshore oil/gas installation. Over the years the offshore oil exploration and production business has relied upon helicopters as the main method of transferring personnel to and from their workplace. Traditionally, and legally these days, the appointment of an HLO is the responsibility of the ship or installation operator. In the early days of offshore helicopter work, the basic requirements of safety were met by persons who would have a primary task (deck supervisor, crane supervisor etc.) and would take responsibility for the helicopter crew change as a secondary task.

The influence of the various civil aviation authorities around the world has had a huge effect on the efficiency and safety of working in this position.

The safety of all personnel traveling to a ship or offshore location is in the hands of these specialists, whilst moving to and from the helicopter. The HLO commands a team, which again, is usually made up of members of the ship or installation crew, known as HDAs (helideck assistants). The assistants themselves are also trained in passenger and freight handling, helicopter safety and fire and rescue.

== Sources ==
- UKOOA Guidelines for the Management of Offshore Helidecks
- UK Civil Aviation Publication 437
- ICAO Annex 14 Volume 2, Heliports
