= Phoenix Fire Department Regional Dispatch Center =

The Phoenix Fire Department Regional Dispatch Center (PFDRDC), also referred to as the Phoenix Regional Dispatch Center, is the fire dispatching center for the Phoenix Fire Department and approximately 26 jurisdictions surrounding the Phoenix metropolitan area. All dispatchers are emergency medical dispatch certified and able to provide help over the phone when needed.

== 911 dialing process ==
When a person dials 911 within the Phoenix metropolitan area, the call initially gets connected to their city's police dispatch center. If the police dispatcher determines that the call is a fire department matter, the call gets transferred to the Phoenix Regional Dispatch Center. If fire services are needed, the PFDRDC dispatcher will dispatch the closest available fire and medical crews to the caller's location, regardless of department or city boundaries. This style of dispatching is available due to a partnership between neighboring agencies known as the Regional Automatic Aid System.

The Phoenix Regional Dispatch Center is run 24/7 by a Battalion Chief, a shift supervisor, a lead dispatcher, and dispatchers who are cross-trained in positions within the dispatch center.

Dispatchers are able to send assignments out to fire and medical crews using a Computer Aided Dispatch (CAD) system installed in each unit vehicle. The CAD is equipped with GPS software that allows dispatchers to send the closest units to incidents and advise callers of how far out help is from their location.

== Regional automatic aid system ==
An initial automatic aid agreement was agreed upon by the Phoenix, Glendale, and Tempe fire departments in 1979. Since then, that partnership has extended to over two dozen fire departments within the Phoenix metropolitan area. As a result, citizens calling for help will have the closest available fire crews responding regardless of jurisdiction.

Departments participating in this system are required to have similar capabilities, equipment, training, and procedures in order to provide effective service when responding alongside one another.

== Participating agencies ==
As of 2025, there are over two dozen agencies participating in the Automatic Regional Aid system and receiving dispatches from the Phoenix Regional Dispatch Center. This is not an exhaustive list:

- Arizona Fire & Medical Authority
- Avondale Fire & Medical
- Buckeye Fire Medical Rescue Department
- Chandler Fire Department
- Daisy Mountain Fire & Medical
- El Mirage Fire Department
- Glendale Fire Department
- Goodyear Fire Department
- Guadalupe Fire Department (Now part of AFMA)
- Maricopa Fire Department
- Peoria Fire-Medical Department
- Phoenix Fire Department
- Scottsdale Fire Department
- Sun City Fire & Medical Department
- Surprise Fire-Medical Department
- Tempe Fire Medical Rescue Department
- Tolleson Fire Department
