= Emergency medical dispatcher =

Telecommunicator that dispatches emergency medical services

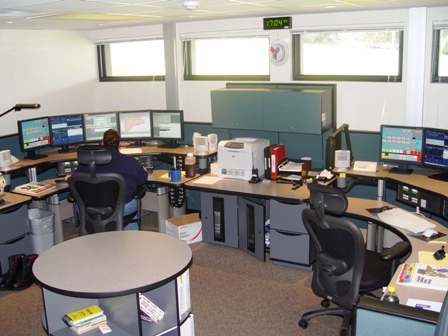
9-1-1 emergency dispatch center

An emergency medical dispatcher is a professional telecommunicator, tasked with the gathering of information related to medical emergencies, the provision of assistance and instructions by voice, prior to the arrival of emergency medical services (EMS), and the dispatching and support of EMS resources responding to an emergency call. The term "emergency medical dispatcher" is also a certification level and a professional designation, certified through the Association of Public-Safety Communications Officials-International (APCO) and the International Academies of Emergency Dispatch. Many dispatchers, whether certified or not, will dispatch using a standard emergency medical dispatch protocol.

== History ==
Dispatchers have always played an essential role of emergency medical services (EMS). At its most basic, the role of the dispatcher has been to identify the problem and the location of the patient, and then identify an ambulance that can be sent to the location. Prior to the professionalization of emergency medical services, this step in the process was often informal; the caller would simply call the local ambulance service, the telephone call would be answered (in many cases by the ambulance attendant who would be responding to the call), the location and problem information would be gathered, and an ambulance assigned to complete the task. The ambulance would then complete the call, return to the station, and wait for the next telephone call.

Although earlier experiments with the use of radio communication in ambulances did occur, it was not until the 1950s that the use of radio dispatch became widespread in the United States and Canada. Indeed, during the 1950s the presence of radio dispatch was often treated as marketing inducement, and was prominently displayed on the sides of ambulances, along with other technological advances, such as carrying oxygen. Dispatch methodology was often determined by the business arrangements of the ambulance company. If the ambulance were under contract to the town, it might be dispatched as an 'add-on' to the fire department or police department resources. In some cases, it might be under contract to the local hospital, and dispatched from there. In many cases, small independent ambulance companies were simply dispatched by a family member or employee, employed part-time in many cases. Ambulance dispatchers required little in the way of qualifications, apart from good telephone manners and a knowledge of the local geography.

In a parallel evolution, the development of 9-1-1 as a national emergency number began in Winnipeg, Manitoba, Canada, in 1959. The concept of a single answering point for emergency calls to public safety agencies caught on quickly. In the United States, the decision was made to utilize the Canadian number, for reasons of ease of memory (4-1-1 and 6-1-1 were already in use), and ease of dialing. In 1967, the number was established as the national emergency number for the United States, although by 2008, coverage of the service was still not complete, and about 4 percent of the United States did not have 9-1-1 service. Calling this single number provided the caller access to police, fire and ambulance services, through what would become known as a common public-safety answering point (PSAP). The technology would also continue to evolve, resulting in "Enhanced 9-1-1" including the ability to 'lock' telephone lines on emergency calls, preventing accidental disconnection, and automatic number identification/automatic location identification (ANI/ALI), which permits the dispatcher to verify the number originating the call (screening out potential false alarms), and identifying the location of the call, against the possibility of the caller becoming disconnected or unconscious.

As the skill set of those in the ambulance increased, so did the importance of information. Ambulance service moved from 'first come, first served' or giving priority to whoever sounded the most panicked, to prioritizing based on how severe the medical emergency was. This occurred slowly at first, with local initiatives and full-time ambulance dispatchers making best guesses. Priority codes developed for ambulance dispatch, and became commonplace, although they have never been fully standardized. As it became possible for those in the ambulance to actually save lives, the process of sending the closest appropriate resource to the person in the greatest need became very important. Dispatchers needed tools to help them make the correct decisions, and a number of products were devised for this purpose.

=== 1970s onward ===
One of the first known examples of call triage occurring in the dispatch centre occurred in 1975, when the Phoenix, Arizona Fire Department assigned some of its paramedics to their dispatch centre in order to interview callers and prioritize calls. The following year, Dr. Jeff Clawson, a physician employed by the Salt Lake City Fire Department as its medical director, developed a series of key questions, pre-arrival instructions, and dispatch priorities to be used in the processing of EMS calls. These ultimately evolved into the Medical Priority Dispatch System (MPDS), APCO (EMD) and PowerPhone's Total Response computer aided call handling (CACH) system. Such systems were initially technologically quite primitive; in the mid-1970s the use of computers in dispatching was extremely uncommon, and those that used them were dealing with very large mainframe computers. Most such systems were based on either reference cards or simple flip charts, and have been described by lay people on more than one occasion as being like a "recipe file" for ambulance dispatchers. The development of pre-arrival instructions presented an entirely new challenge for those involved in emergency medical dispatch; it might take eight or more minutes for paramedics to arrive at the patient's side, but dispatchers could be there in seconds. Physicians began to see a dramatic new potential for the saving of lives by means of simple scripted telephone instructions from the dispatcher, and the concept of Dispatch Life Support was born. Suddenly dispatchers were providing complex information and instructions to callers, and even providing guidance on performing procedures such as cardiopulmonary resuscitation (CPR) by telephone. The concept became an area of medical research, and even EMS medical directors debated on the best approach to such services.

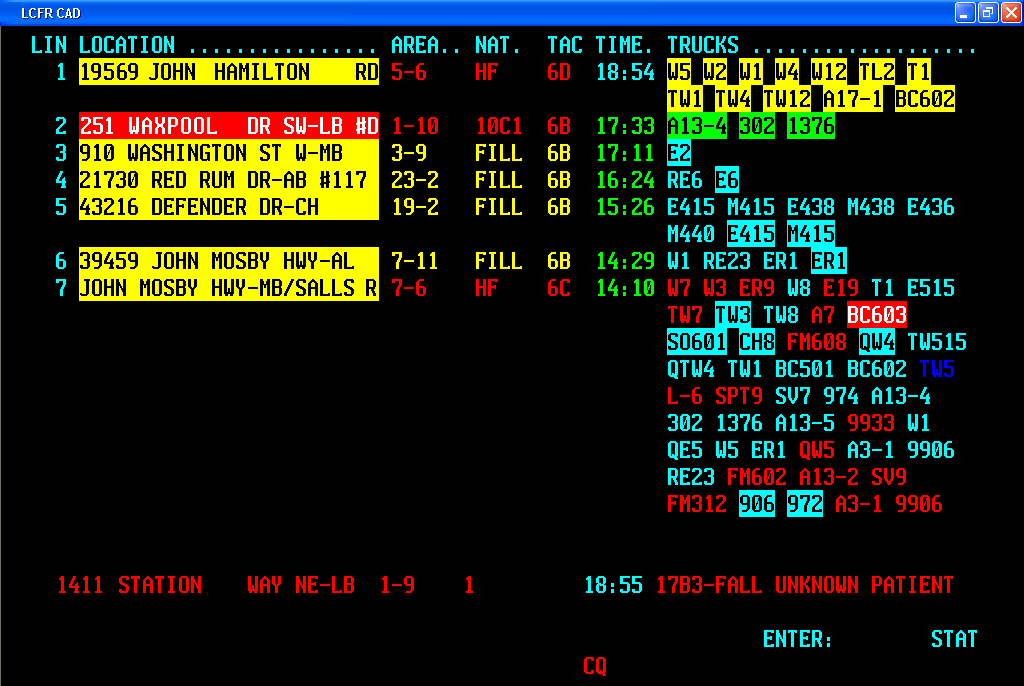
Computer-aided dispatch

As technology, and particularly computer technology, evolved, the dispatching of EMS resources took on an entirely new dimension, and required completely new skill sets. The process of dispatching was supported by computers, and moved in many locales to a paperless system that required above average computer skills. Computer-aided dispatch (CAD) systems not only permitted the dispatcher to record the call information, but also automated the call triage process, allowing EMD systems to become algorithm-based decision support tools. Technologies once available only to the military, such as satellite-based automatic vehicle location allowed CAD systems to constantly monitor the location and status of response resources, making response resource assignment recommendations to human dispatchers, allowing human dispatchers to watch the physical movement of their resources across a computerized map, and creating a permanent record of the call for future use.

Emergency medical dispatchers and prioritized dispatching have become a critical and demanding part of EMS service delivery. The PSAP and, in effect the EMD, become the functional link between the public and allocation of emergency resources, including police, fire and EMS. As the system has evolved and become professionalized, control of the Advanced Medical Priority Dispatch System (MPDS), originally developed by Dr. Jeff Clawson, has been turned over to Medical Priority Consultants, Inc. (now known as Priority Dispatch Corporation), while APCO and PowerPhone developed separate systems. The National Academy of Emergency Medical Dispatchers was subsequently established by Dr. Clawson as a non-profit advisory organization to develop products and services provided by PDC. A formal process for the development of emergency medical dispatch protocols and guidelines continues to be developed by National Institutes of Health; the National Association of Emergency Medical Services Physicians, a professional association of EMS medical directors; and the National Association of State Emergency Medical Services Directors (NASEMSD).

== Role ==
In most modern EMS systems, the emergency medical dispatcher (EMD) will fill a number of critical functions. The first of these is the identification of basic call information, including the location and telephone number of the caller, the location of the patient, the general nature of the problem, and any special circumstances. In most EMS systems, the telephone remains almost a singular point of access for those needing assistance.

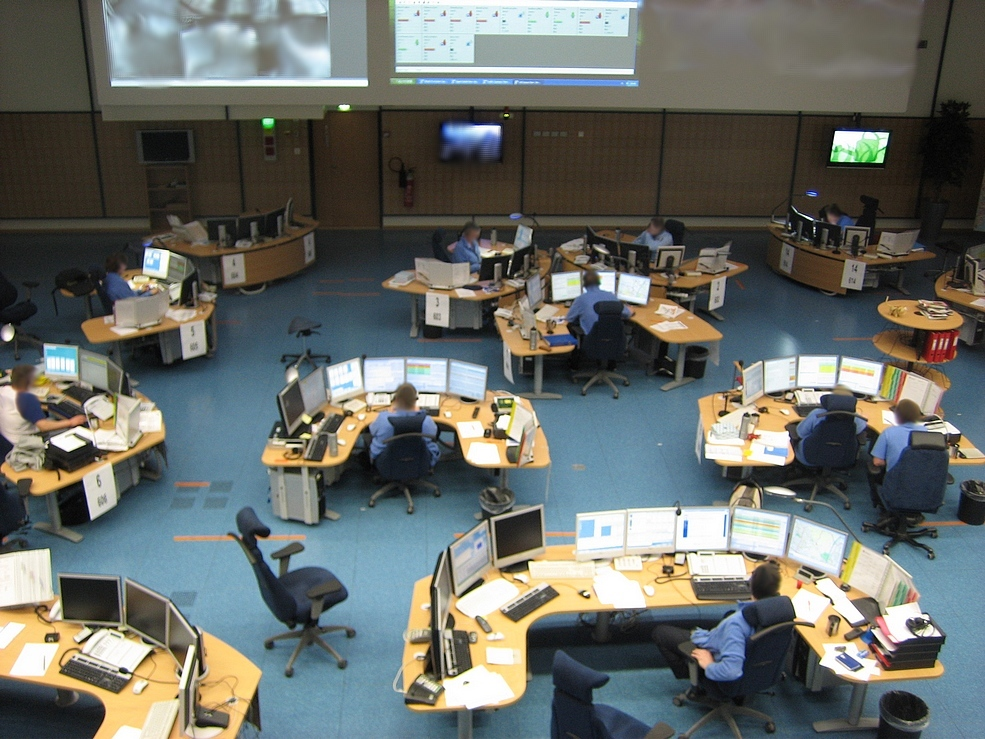
Emergency dispatch center in Finland

There are general exceptions to this rule. Most of them still involve 9-1-1 calls, but using new alerting mechanisms upstream from the 9-1-1 call. While these new applications are not directly monitored by the EMD, the EMD nevertheless remains the primary point of contact into the dispatch system. The three most common new applications are:

- Some public access defibrillators, upon removal, have an alarm built in that triggers an automated 9-1-1 call on the assumption that an AED is being removed for emergency medical reasons. Maintenance removal utilizes an alarm override.
- Personal safety alarms, designed for use by the elderly or infirm, such as Lifeline. They usually take the form of a bracelet or pendant. The device will have a push-button-activated alarm, and possibly a motion sensor for automatic alarms, which are relayed through a base unit attached to a telephone landline. Most such systems inform a monitoring company, which follow protocol for informing 9-1-1 about the potential emergency of the subscriber. Sophisticated versions of these systems may even allow two-way voice communication among the subscriber, the monitoring company, and emergency dispatch.
- Vehicle monitoring systems (such as GM OnStar). Such systems have sensors to monitor for vehicle crashes, mobile or satellite telephony to call the monitoring company, and GPS to identify the vehicle's location. In the event that the system detects a possible crash situation, the system will call the monitoring center and submit the crash and location information. If the operator cannot verify with the car's occupants that emergency services are unnecessary, then the operator will call the PSAP appropriate to the vehicle's location. This is becoming increasingly common in North America.

The next area of responsibility involves the triage of incoming calls, providing expert systematized caller interrogation, using the script provided by the Emergency Medical Dispatch system, in order to determine the likely severity of the patient's illness or injury, so that the most appropriate type of response resource may be expedited. All calls are prioritized by medical symptom/condition acuity. This process may be further complicated by panic-stricken callers who scream, cry, or make unreasonable demands. The trained EMD uses interpersonal and crisis management skills to sort through these distractions, taking control of the conversation, calming the caller, and extracting the necessary information. This inquiry begins with the obvious questions regarding whether the patient is conscious or breathing. The questioning will continue until the EMD is able to qualify a potentially life-threatening condition, at which time the closest appropriate response resource (such as a paramedic-staffed ambulance service) is notified to initiate pinpointing the call location. When this occurs, the EMD will continue the questioning, attempting to gather additional relevant information, useful to determine response speed, the type of resources dispatched, or the type of equipment that the paramedics will bring to the site when they arrive. In most cases, this 'pre-alert' function will not be required, and the resource will simply be dispatched when all of the required information has been gathered. Ultimately, the decision on how to proceed, or when to interrupt the established process, requires the judgment of the EMD handling the call. Otherwise, the manner in which this questioning proceeds is often governed by protocols, or by decision-support software.

An important part of emergency medical dispatch is telecommunicator cardiopulmonary resuscitation (T-CPR), also known as dispatcher-assisted CPR. When a caller describes a person who is unresponsive and not breathing normally, the dispatcher may identify a possible cardiac arrest and provide standardized chest-compression instructions while emergency medical personnel are en route. T-CPR can help an untrained caller begin CPR and can also remind a previously trained caller how to perform it. The American Heart Association recommends that T-CPR programs include rapid recognition of cardiac arrest, immediate CPR instructions, dispatcher training, and ongoing review of program performance.

The third function is the selection and assignment of the most appropriate type of response resource, such as an ambulance, from the closest or the most appropriate location, depending on the nature of the problem, and ensuring that the crew of the response resource receive all of the appropriate information. The EMD is responsible for the management and work assignment (physicians and supervisors provide work direction) for all of the response resources in the EMS system. In many cases, the EMD is responsible for multiple response resources simultaneously, and these may include ALS, BLS, or some mix of skills, ambulances, 'fly-cars', and other types of resources. In a quiet, rural setting, such resources may be at a fixed point, in quarters, most of the time, while in other cases, such as urban settings, all or many of the resources may be mobile. It is not uncommon, in a large urban centre, for an EMD to manage and direct as many as 20 response resources simultaneously. It is the job of the EMD to analyze the information and ensure that it leads to the right resource being sent to the patient in the shortest appropriate time. This requires a constant level of awareness of the location and status of each resource, so that the closest available and appropriate resource may be sent to each call. Particularly in larger, urban settings, the mental demands and stress level may be comparable to those of an air traffic controller, and 'burn-out' rates may be quite high. This has been eased somewhat in recent years through the use of Automatic Vehicle Locating (AVL), permitting the EMD to monitor the location and status of all assigned resources using a computer screen instead of by memory.

The EMDs next priority is to provide and assist the layperson/caller with pre-arrival instructions to help the victim, using standardized protocols developed in cooperation with local medical directors. Such instructions may consist of simple advice to keep the patient calm and comfortable or to gather additional background information for responding paramedics. The instructions can also frequently become more complex, providing directions over the telephone for an untrained person to perform CPR, for example. Examples of EMDs guiding family members through assisting a loved one with the process of childbirth prior to the arrival of the ambulance are also quite common. The challenge for the EMD is often the knowledge level of the caller. In some cases, the caller may have prior first-aid and/or CPR training, but it is often just as likely that the caller has no prior training or experience at all. This process may still consist of a symptom-based flip-card system, but is increasingly automated through computer aided dispatch software.

The EMD is generally also responsible for providing information support to the responding resources. This may include callbacks to the call originator to clarify information. It may involve clarifying the exact location of the patient, or sending a bystander to meet the ambulance and direct paramedics to the patient. It may also include requests from the EMS crew to provide support resources, such as additional ambulances, rescue equipment, or a helicopter. The EMD also plays a key role in the safety of EMS staff. They are the first with the opportunity to assess the situation that the crew is responding to, will maintain contact on the scene in order to monitor crew safety, and are frequently responsible for requesting emergency police response to 'back up' paramedics when they encounter a violent situation. EMDs are often responsible for monitoring the status of local hospitals, advising paramedics on which hospitals are accepting ambulance patients, and which are on 're-direct' or 'divert'. In many cases, the EMD may be responsible for notifying the hospital of incoming patients on behalf of the response resource crew. Paramedics who are working on patients or driving an ambulance are rarely able to make a detailed telephone call. As a result, the EMD will relay any advance notification regarding patient situation or status, once in transit.

Finally, the EMD ensures that the information regarding each call is collected in a consistent manner, for both legal and quality assurance purposes. In most jurisdictions, all EMS records, including both patient care and dispatch records, and also recordings of dispatch radio and telephone conversations, are considered to be legal documents. Dispatch records are often a subject of interest in legal proceedings, particularly with respect to initial information obtained, statements made by the caller, and response times for resources. Any or all may be demanded by a criminal court or civil court, a public inquiry, or a coroner's inquest, and may have to be produced as evidence. It is not uncommon in some jurisdictions for EMDs to be summoned to court, in order to provide evidence regarding their activities. As a result, there is frequently a legal requirement for the long-term storage of such information, and the specific requirements are likely to vary by both country and jurisdiction. Additionally, medical directors will frequently rely on information provided by EMDs for the purpose of medical quality assurance for paramedics; in particular analyzing conversations between paramedics and dispatchers or physicians, analyzing the paramedic's actions and judgments in the light of the information that they were provided with. As a direct result of these two factors, there is a requirement for all call information to be collected and stored in a regular, consistent, and professional manner, and this too, will often fall to the EMD, at least in the initial stages.

== Work locations ==
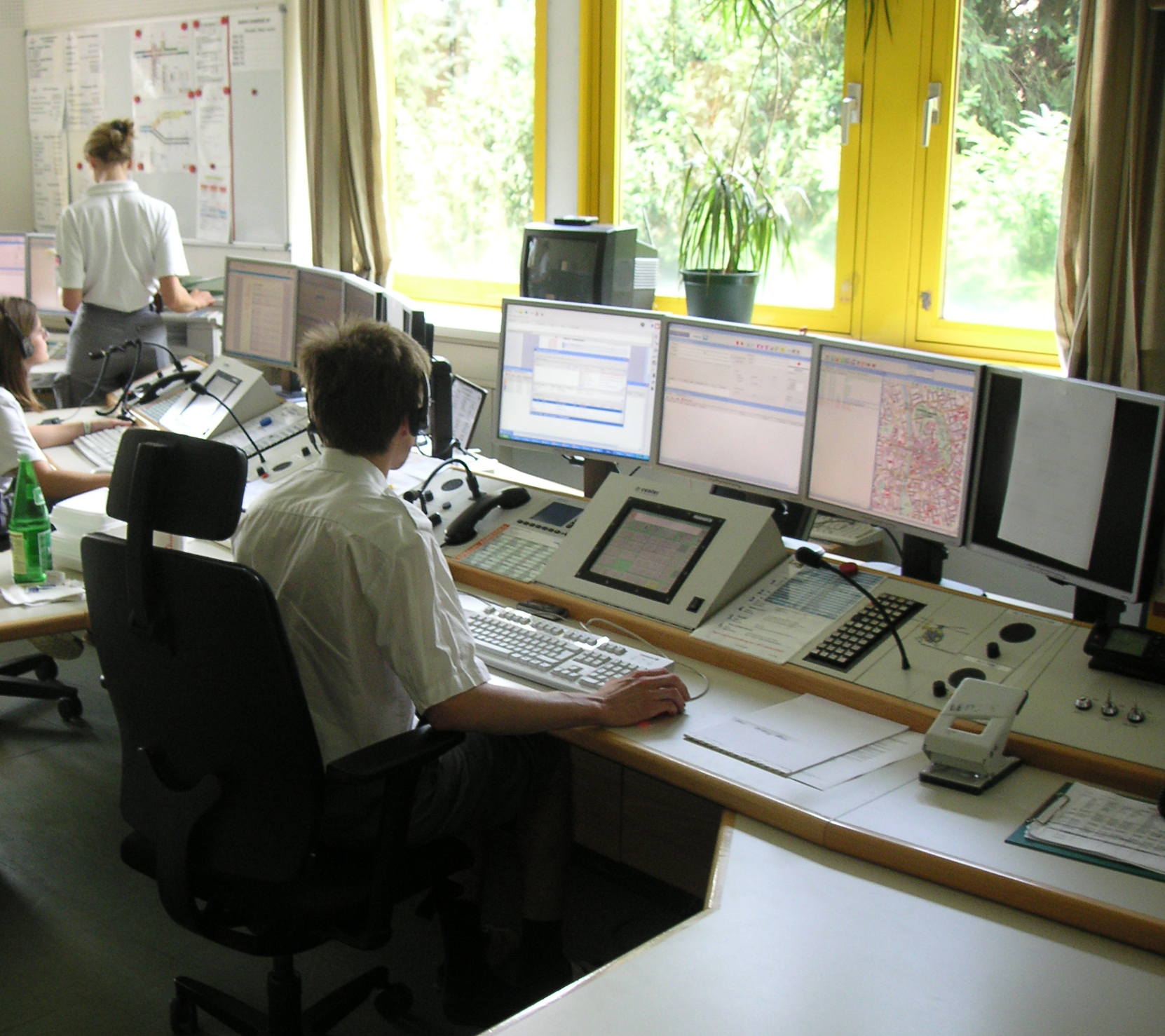
EMD in Austria

The overwhelming majority of EMDs will perform their work in an EMS dispatch centre. Occasionally this may involve some 'site work', such as on-site dispatching for large special events, but this is somewhat rare. EMS dispatching may be a single, independent process, or it may be a mixed function with one or more of the other emergency services. In some smaller jurisdictions, the EMS, fire and police dispatch functions, and even the 9-1-1 system may be physically co-located, but with different specialist staff performing each function. Such decisions are frequently made based on the sizes of the services involved, and their call volumes. While some jurisdictions are required, generally through economics or size, to provide a single public safety dispatch system, the three emergency services have requirements and procedures that are sufficiently different that wherever possible, independent dispatching is preferred. Even in truly large, mixed (fire and EMS) services, such as the New York City Fire Department, the functions and requirements are seen as sufficiently different that an independent dispatch function is maintained for each. The emergency services in question all have their own priorities, and while they are extremely important to each, those priorities often simply conflict too greatly to allow reasonable joint dispatch functions. To illustrate, in a scenario with a single dispatcher for both fire and EMS: the truck officer on a fire apparatus is requesting additional resources for a working fire with a possibility of trapped people, and two paramedics are attempting to resuscitate a dying child, but require medical direction, which request gets priority? Another important consideration is workload; in many jurisdictions the call volume of the EMS system is 5-6 times as great as that of the Fire Department. Asking fire service dispatchers to also dispatch EMS resources, or vice versa, may exceed the capabilities of the dispatchers. Even when joint dispatching is pursued by a community, the various types of dispatch functions to support EMS, fire and police are so different that the dispatchers involved will require separate training and certification in each.

Increasingly, such public safety dispatch locations are becoming community owned and operated resources. As such, they tend to be co-located with other emergency service resources, as in a headquarters-type complex. Such environments must strike a 'balance' between the high-tech requirements of the work, including large numbers of computers, telephone lines, and radios, and the psychological needs of the human beings operating them. The environment is frequently both high-performance and high-stress, and every measure must be taken to ensure as little ambient stress in the environment as possible. Such issues are often the subject of careful design and also ergonomics. Environmental colour choices, the reduction of ambient noise (and therefore stress) and the physical design of the seating and consoles used by the EMD are all intended to reduce stress levels. Supervisory staff also typically monitor staff carefully, particularly in high-performance environments, ensuring that rest and meal breaks are taken, and occasionally providing a 'time out' after a particularly difficult call. Despite all of these measures, occupational stress is a significant factor for many EMDs, and the 'burnout' rate for those in these positions tends to be higher than other occupations.

The role and certification of Emergency Medical Dispatcher has its origins in the United States but is gradually gaining acceptance in many other countries. The position and credential are in widespread use in Canada and the United Kingdom. The acceptance and use of this position and credential are growing in the European Union, in Australia, and elsewhere. In many respects, the development of this position is a logical sequel to the incorporation of the emergency medical dispatch system by EMS. Together, NAED and PDC often present themselves as the de facto standard in EMD systems. However, the continued recognition given to alternative providers suggests that this approach is not universally accepted. And not all EMS dispatch worldwide is conducted by EMDs. In some jurisdictions using the Franco-German model of EMS service delivery (SAMU in France, for example), a call for a medical emergency will not be processed by an EMD, but generally by a physician, who will decide whether or not an ambulance will even be sent.

== Training ==
Training for EMDs is required to meet a National Standard Curriculum, as outlined by the National Highway Traffic Safety Administration of the U.S. government. This training program may be offered by private companies, by community colleges, or by some large EMS systems which are self-dispatching. The minimum length of such training is 32 classroom hours, covering such topics as EMD Roles and Responsibilities, Legal and Liability Issues in EMD, National and State Standards for EMD, Resource Allocation, Layout and Structure of EMD Guidecards, Obtaining Information from Callers, Anatomy and Physiology, Chief Complaint Types, Quality Assurance & Recertification and Stress Management. Certification in CPR is not mandatory, but upon completion of the training, students are required to sit a certification examination. Upon completion of the training and certification, Emergency Medical Dispatchers are required to complete 24 hours of Continuing Dispatch Education every two years, in order to maintain certification. This level of training and certification only satisfies the national curriculum, and in most cases, additional training will be required. Additional training will have a local focus, and will deal with local geographical knowledge, dispatch procedures, local laws and service policy. Additional training may be required to orient new emergency medical dispatchers to different forms of 9-1-1 telecommunication (if this will be a part of their job function). This may also include (depending on the jurisdiction) EFD (Emergency Fire Dispatching), EPD (Emergency Police Dispatching), ETC (emergency telecommunication), ECE (Executive Certification Course), CMC (Communication Center Manager), when such services are jointly operated. Similar courses are also generally available in Law Enforcement Dispatch (LED), Fire Service Dispatch (FSD), and Public Safety Dispatch (PSD), designed for those working in a multi-agency 9-1-1 call center that handles police, fire and EMS dispatching.

Additional local training is likely to be required for the actual skill of dispatching. This may involve extensive 'drilling' on local geography, for example. Large dispatch centres also tend to train staff in a graduated manner. Some of the more sophisticated EMS systems might actually have a teaching 'lab' complete with dispatch consoles, where the trainees can practice dealing with simulated calls, using exactly the same technologies that would be present in a real call centre. In other cases, or in addition to this 'lab' work in many cases, a graduated process of introduction and mentoring is used to develop an EMD. This generally involves supervised introduction of tasks, from the lowest priority and least stressful, to the highest priority and most stressful. A typical pattern might begin with the candidate performing call reception, then progressing to the actual dispatching of non-emergency transfers, dispatching emergency calls during periods of low volume, dispatching emergency calls at periods of high volume, and so on. In high performance systems, the path to being left alone to run an emergency dispatch console during high volume periods may take months to travel. Some EMS dispatch centres also have designated Communications Training Officers, who are the only people permitted to train or mentor new EMD candidates.

Following the murder of Denise Amber Lee in 2008, new laws are being considered in the State of Florida regarding the training of all public safety telecommunicators including EMDs. One of the 9-1-1 calls relating to her abduction was allegedly mishandled.

== Career paths in English-speaking countries ==
EMDs come to their jobs from a variety of backgrounds. These might involve no prior experience at all, but are more likely to involve some other previous form of dispatching experience (taxis and tow trucks are common). In some cases, prior dispatch experience might involve one of the other emergency services. In some cases, although not a great many, trained paramedics may become EMDs. This may happen as the result of a work-related injury resulting in disability, or it may simply be that a paramedic completes training and then finds that field work is not to their taste, or that they lack the ability to perform the physical aspects of being a paramedic (e.g. heavy lifting) without fear of injury. There is some debate, particularly between paramedics and EMDs, as to whether prior training as a paramedic actually constitutes an advantage or an unnecessary distraction from the EMD job function. Valid perspectives exist on both sides of the debate.

In large EMS systems, EMDs may follow a progressive career path. Actual dispatching may lead to training positions, and from there to supervisory or even managerial positions within the dispatch centre. EMDs may move from smaller systems to larger systems, just as paramedics sometimes do, in search of advancement opportunities, or economic improvements. In some cases, EMDs may choose to retrain and move to fire dispatch (EFD), to police dispatch (EPD), or to the 9-1-1 call centre. The inequities in the sheer amount of training required for certification make advancement of EMDs to paramedic status an extremely infrequent event. The required additional training, depending on the jurisdiction, might take two years or more, part-time, in addition to regular full-time employment, putting this option beyond the reach of all but the most determined. Typically, EMDs who are also certified paramedics tend to have been paramedics first.

== See also ==
- Emergency management
- Emergency medical services
- 9-1-1
- Dispatcher
- Police radio
- Radio scanner
- Enhanced 9-1-1
- Computer-aided dispatch
- Triage
- Ambulance
- Incident Command System
- Medical Priority Dispatch System
- Advanced Medical Priority Dispatch System
- Emergency medical services in France (SAMU)
- Friendly caller program
