= Ambulance station =

Facility used to store ambulances ready to use

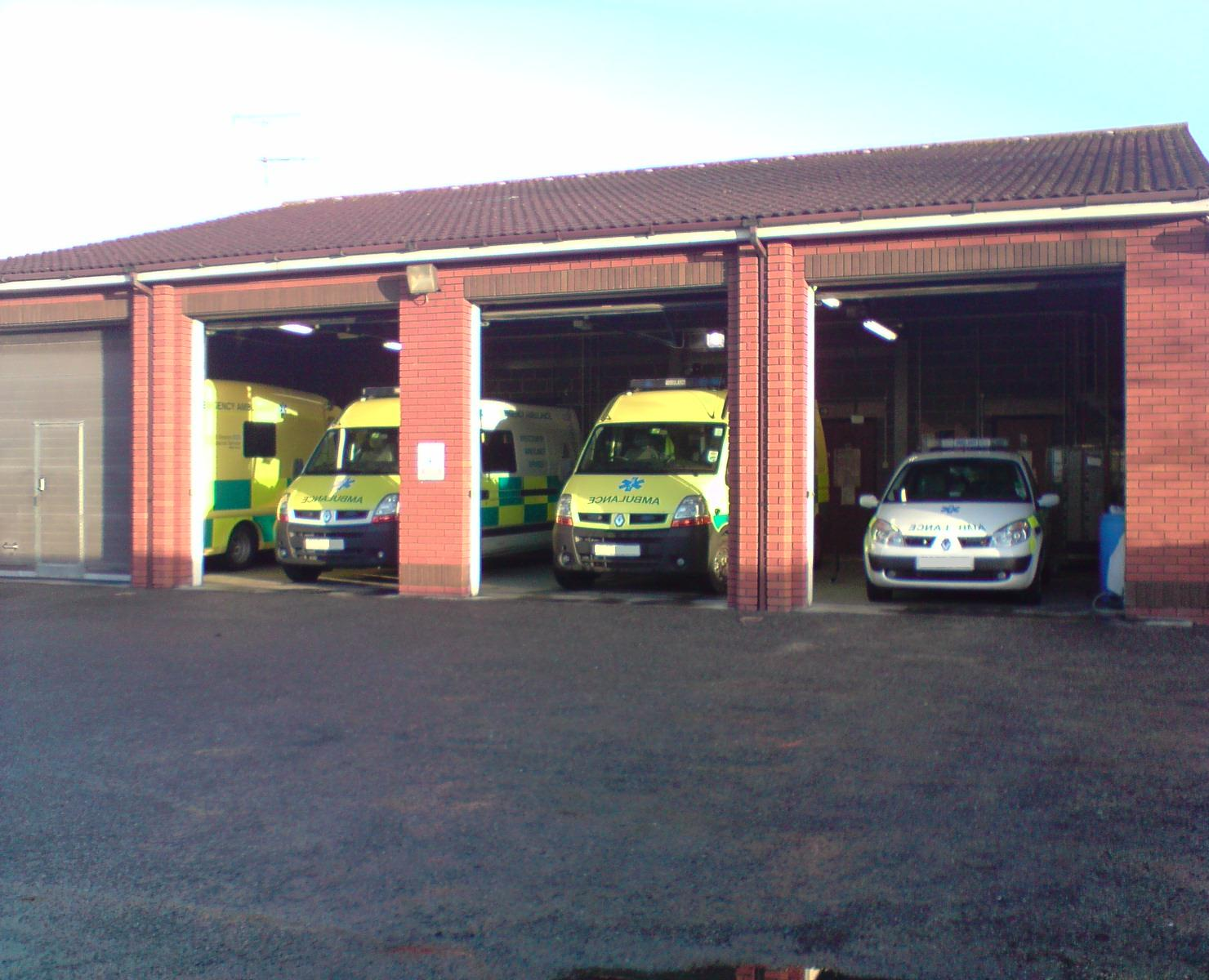
A typical ambulance station.

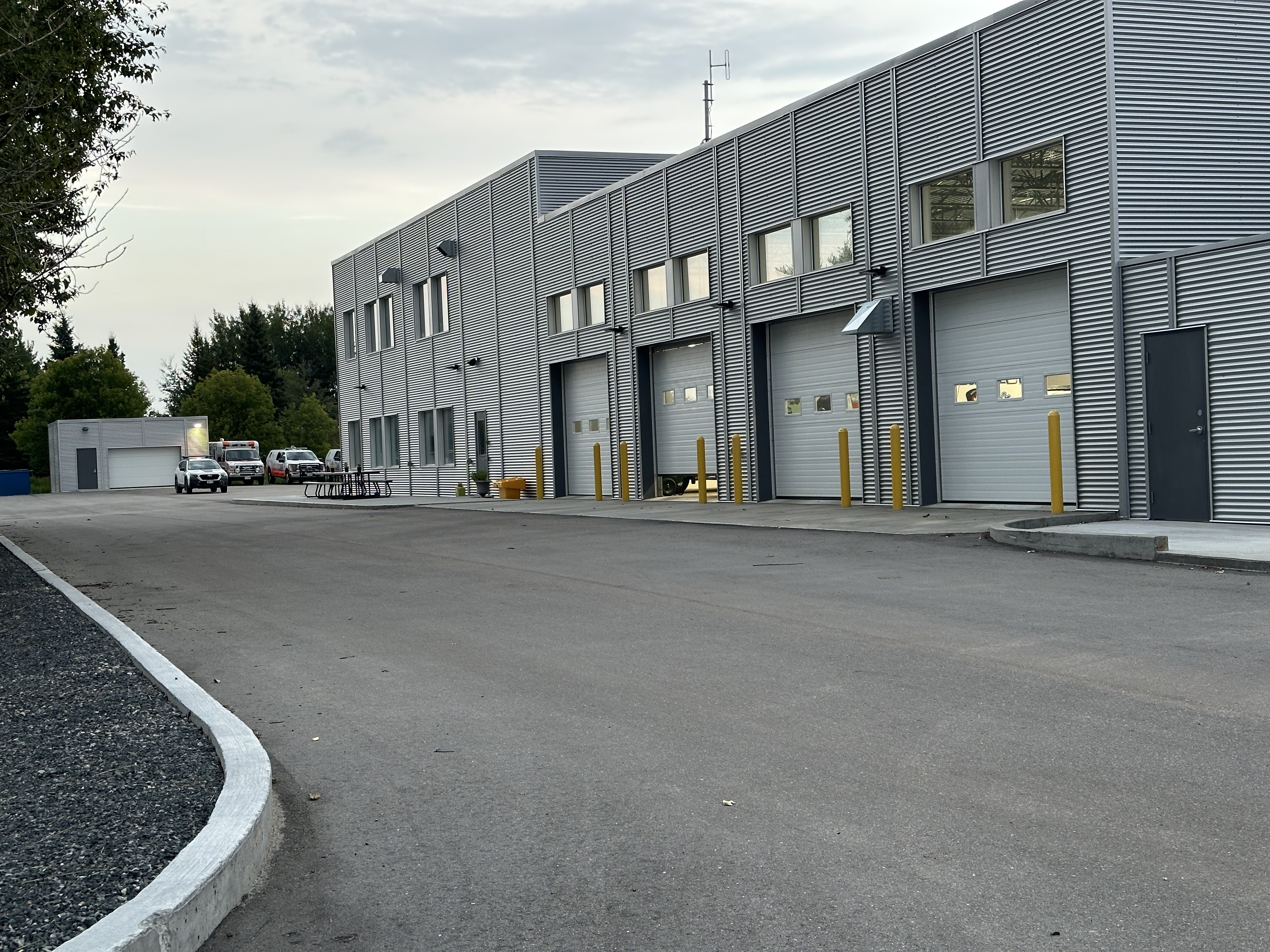
Ambulance base in Dryden, Ontario

An ambulance station is a structure or other area set aside for storage of ambulance vehicles and their medical equipment, as well as working and living space for their staff.

Ambulance stations have facilities for maintaining ambulance vehicles, such as a charger for the vehicles' batteries. They have space for storing and maintaining medical equipment, and sometimes a fuel pump. There will also be facilities for the crews, including a kitchen and showers. It varies as to whether crews routinely wait at the station itself for call-outs (as full-time firefighters do). If they do, then the station usually have an alerting system. Larger stations may have a manager's office or training rooms.

In some instances, ambulance stations may be co-located with, or integral to, other emergency service facilities, such as fire stations or police stations, especially where the ambulance service is run by the fire department.

In fire departments that run the emergency medical services, it is common for ambulances to be based at separate stations, which are usually shared with a fire apparatus. Examples of this include the Chicago Fire Department, Phoenix Fire Department and Los Angeles County Fire Department (as depicted in Emergency!). In other emergency medical services, ambulance stations are centralized hubs where crews start and end their shifts, but they usually drive to "standby points" to await call-outs. This arrangement is common in independent ambulance services and is also used in the New York City Fire Department. Since the 1990s, there has been a trend in the United Kingdom to reduce the number of ambulance stations and rely on standby points to keep all areas covered.
