= Phoenix Fire =

Phoenix Fire is the name of:

- Phoenix Fire (soccer), 1980 ASL soccer team
- Phoenix Fire Office, English insurance company
- Phoenix Fire Department, American fire protection service
- Phoenix Fire Birds, American baseball team
