= New York City Fire Department Bureau of EMS =

New York City emergency medical service

Fire Department of New York Bureau of Emergency Medical Services

Operational area
- Country: United States
- State: New York
- City: New York City

Agency overview
- Established: March 17, 1996
- Annual calls: 1,615,531 (FY 2025)
- Employees: 4,549 (as of October 10, 2025)
- Staffing: Career
- Chief of EMS Operations: Paul A. Miano
- Assistant Chief of EMS Administration: Kathleen E. Knuth
- Assistant Chief of EMS Field Services: Cesar A. Escobar
- EMS level: Advanced Life Support (ALS) and Basic Life Support (BLS)
- Motto: "New York's Best"

Facilities and equipment
- Divisions: 9
- Stations: 39
- Ambulances: 337 (in service); 651 (fleet roster)

The New York City Fire Department Bureau of Emergency Medical Services (FDNY EMS) is a division of the New York City Fire Department (FDNY) in charge of emergency medical services for New York City. It was established on March 17, 1996, following the merger of the FDNY and New York City Health and Hospitals Corporation's emergency medical services division. FDNY EMS provides coverage of all five boroughs of New York City with ambulances and a variety of specialized response vehicles.

== History ==
Prior to March 17, 1996, municipal ambulances were operated by NYC EMS under the New York City Health and Hospitals Corporation, a public benefit corporation, which dispatched both its own ambulances and hospital ambulances. On March 17, 1996, NYC EMS merged with the FDNY, forming the Bureau of EMS. Employees of the newly formed bureau were considered FDNY employees and became eligible for transfer to firefighter within the department. As a result of the merger, the FDNY Bureau of EMS became the largest fire department-based EMS system in the United States.

At the time of the merger, EMS had 3,200 workers and responded to 1.2 million calls each year.

== Operations ==
FDNY EMS is led by the Chief of the Bureau of Emergency Medical Services. The bureau is organized into two major commands: Field Operations and Administration. They are overseen by an EMS Assistant Chief. Field Operations are divided into three borough commands (Bronx, Brooklyn/Staten Island, Manhattan & Queens). These are led by a Deputy Assistant Chief. These areas are further subdivided into nine divisions. Each division is led by a Division Chief. They are supported by a Division Captain and up to five Deputy Chiefs. Divisions are then broken down into EMS stations, which are led by Captains and Lieutenants.

FDNY EMS coordinates the New York City 911 emergency medical response system, which includes FDNY-operated ambulances and hospital-based voluntary ambulances. As of 2019, FDNY oversaw 1,266 daily ambulance tours within the 911 system; 844 (about 67%) were operated by FDNY and 422 (about 33%) were operated by voluntary hospital-based providers. Private and volunteer ambulance organizations may also be used to supplement 911 coverage during periods of unusually high demand or severe weather. FDNY EMS manages emergency medical dispatch (EMD) and provides online medical control (telemetry), and coordinates EMS operations at mass-casualty incidents (MCIs) in New York City.

=== Personnel ===
As of October 10, 2025, FDNY EMS had 4,549 uniformed EMS personnel. This included 2,818 EMTs, 967 paramedics, 77 EMS trainees, and 687 officers (Chief of EMS through Sergeant).

FDNY EMS uniformed workforce by title (Oct. 10, 2025)
Title	Count
EMS Trainee	77 EMS Trainees
EMT	2,818 EMTs
Paramedic	967 Paramedics
Sergeant	35 Sergeants
Lieutenant	512 Lieutenants
Captain	76 Captains
Deputy Chief	32 Deputy Chiefs
Division Chief	21 Division Chiefs
Deputy Assistant Chief	8 Deputy Assistant Chiefs
Assistant Chief	2 Assistant Chiefs
Chief of EMS	1 Chief Of EMS

== Leadership & Organization ==
- Chief of EMS Operations – Paul A. Miano
  - Assistant Chief of EMS Administration – Kathleen E. Knuth
    - Deputy Assistant Chief of Administration - Grace M. Cacciola
      - Division Chief of EPCR
      - Division Chief of Voluntary Hospitals
      - Division Chief of Administration
      - Deputy Chief of the Office of Medical Affairs/Data Control Unit
      - Deputy Chief of EMS Personnel
    - Deputy Assistant Chief of EMS Training - Ian C. Swords
      - Division Chief of EMS Training
      - Division Chief of EMS Training
      - Deputy Chief of EMS Training
      - Deputy Chief of EMS Training
    - Deputy Assistant Chief of EMS Planning - Evan S. Suchecki
      - Division Chief of Health Services
      - Division Chief of Health Services
    - Deputy Assistant Chief of Emergency Medical Dispatch - Denise M. Werner
      - Division Chief of PSAC 1 EMD
        - Deputy Chief of PSAC 1 EMD
      - Division Chief of PSAC 2 EMD
        - Deputy Chief of PSAC 2 EMD
  - Assistant Chief of EMS Field Services – Cesar A. Escobar
    - Deputy Assistant Chief of EMS Manhattan Borough Command - Charles C. Morgan
      - Division Chief, Division 1 Manhattan South
        - Stations 4, 7 & 8.
      - Division Chief, Division 6 Manhattan North
        - Stations 10, 13 & 16.
    - Deputy Assistant Chief of EMS Queens Borough Command - Joseph J. Pataky
      - Division Chief, Division 4 Queens South
        - Stations 47, 50, 52, 50A, 53 & 54.
      - Division Chief, Division 9 Queens North
        - Stations 45, 46, 49, 49A, 52 & 90.
    - Deputy Assistant Chief of EMS Bronx Borough Command - Stacy A. Scanlon
      - Division Chief, Division 2 Bronx South
        - Stations 14, 17, 18, 26, 55 & 55M.
      - Division Chief, Division 7 Bronx North
        - Stations 3, 3M, 15, 19, 20 & 27.
    - Deputy Assistant Chief of EMS Brooklyn/Staten Island Borough Command - Tonya M. Boyd
      - Division Chief, Division 3 Brooklyn Central
        - Stations 38, 39, 44, 58 & 59.
      - Division Chief, Division 5 Brooklyn South/Staten Island
        - Stations 22, 23, 40 & 43.
      - Division Chief, Division 8 Brooklyn North
        - Stations 31, 32, 35 & 57.

== Training ==
Prospective FDNY EMTs and paramedics are trained at the FDNY EMS Academy at Fort Totten in Queens. EMT training typically lasts 18-20 weeks, depending on whether the candidate already holds New York State EMT certification. Paramedic training is a minimum of 11 months for FDNY EMTs; EMTs who already hold New York State paramedic certification may complete a shorter 10 week training program when promoting to paramedic. Probationary training is conducted full time. The academy also provides certified first responder training for FDNY firefighters and continuing medical education for EMS members, including emergency vehicle operations and recertification courses. Haz-Tac initial and refresher training is conducted at the FDNY Fire Academy campus on Randall's Island and Wards Island.

== Field Units ==
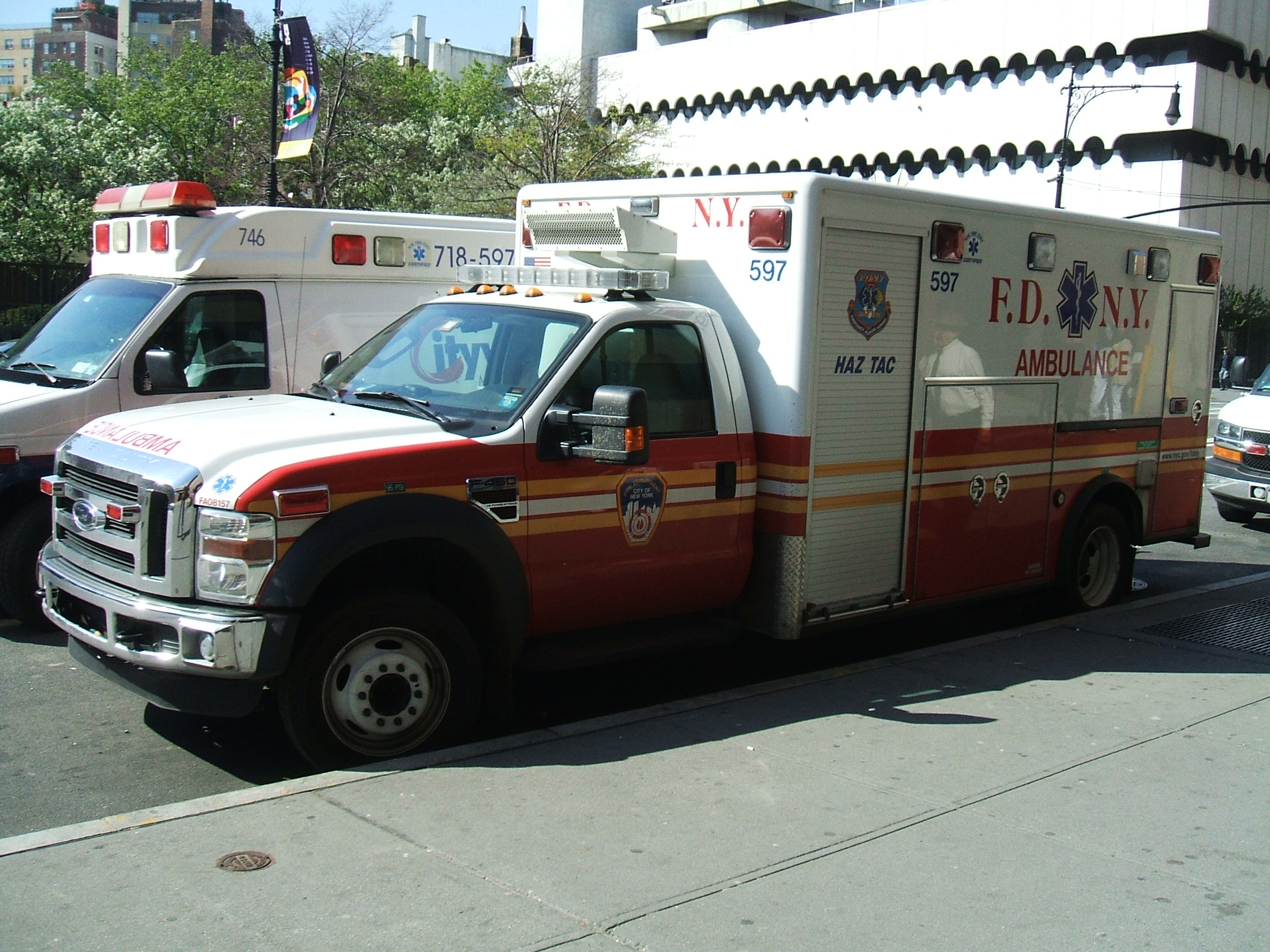
An older 2008 Ford F-450 FDNY Haz-Tac Ambulance

The FDNY EMS uses a variety of units:

- Regular ambulances may be staffed to Basic Life Support (BLS) or Advanced Life Support (ALS) levels.
- The paramedic response units are modified ambulances that do not have stretchers and are forbidden to transport patients. There are pilot fly-cars that are EV mustangs.
- Haz-Tac ambulances, also known as Hazardous Material Tactical Units, are ambulances with EMTs or Paramedics trained to the hazardous materials technician level allowing them to provide emergency medical care and decontamination in a hazardous environment. There are 39 haz-tac ambulance units.
- Rescue ambulances staff Rescue Medics and are ALS providers who are also trained to the level of hazmat technician in addition to training in high angle rescue, confined space medicine, treatment in other austere environments and water rescue training. There are 11 of these units throughout the city. These paramedics also possess an expanded scope of practice, including rapid sequence intubation, surgical cricothyrotomy, ultrasound, and additional drugs in their formulary. They are also able to assist an EMS response physician with select procedures during prolonged rescue operations.
- The bariatric unit is a specially designed ambulance that has a winch, ramp and stretcher rated for patients that are over 850 lbs.
- EMS conditions cars are vehicles assigned to EMS lieutenants or captains, the supervisors overseeing the activities of the ambulance crews in their jurisdiction. They may also respond to certain call types that may require a supervisor on scene to coordinate resources (e.g. a Mass-casualty incident, structure fires, cardiac arrests, motor vehicle collisions, etc.) There is generally one assigned per station.

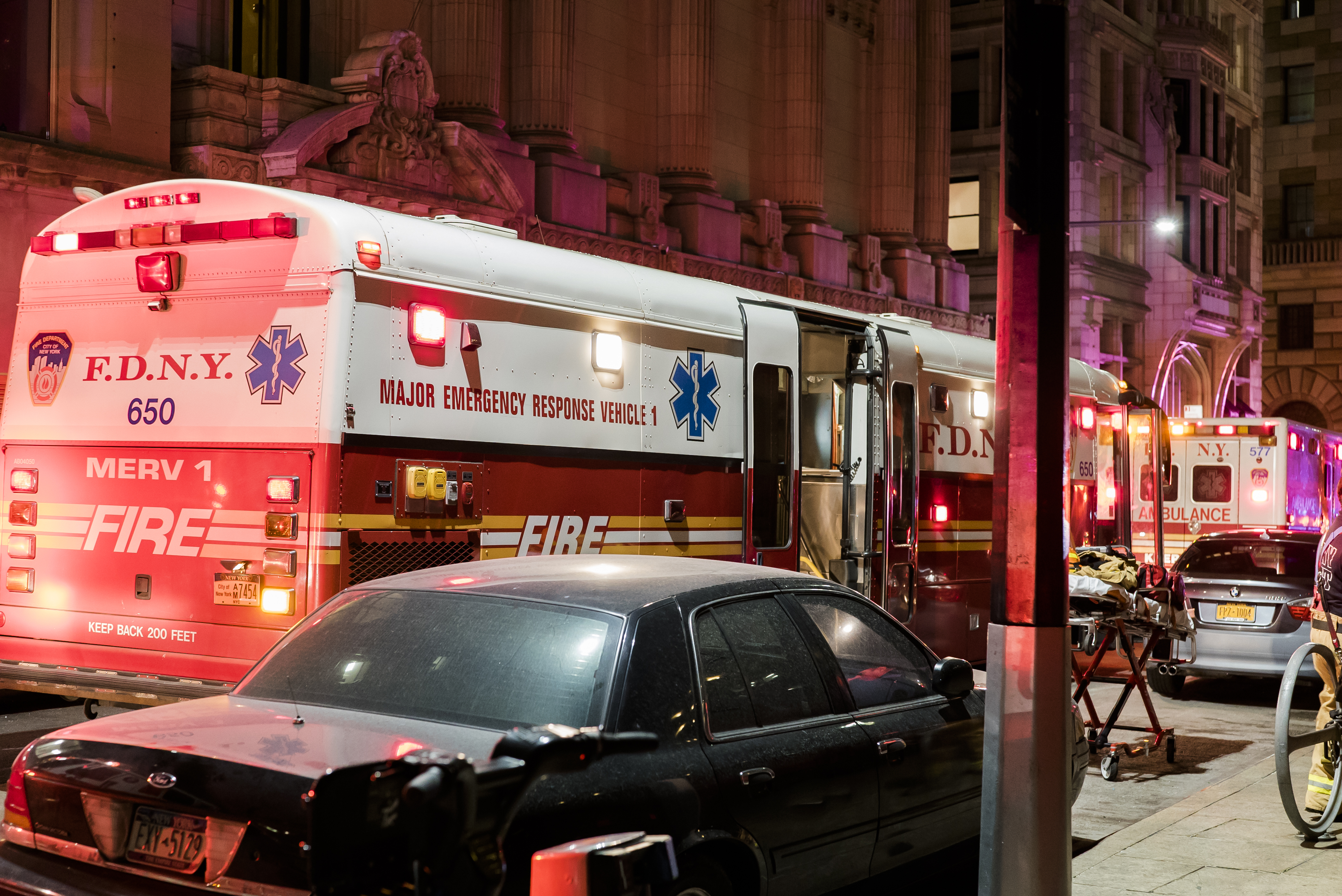
MERV-1

- EMS major emergency response vehicles (MERV) are modified school busses that are able to treat multiple casualties at the same time, with ALS and BLS functions. The unit seats 14 and has a stretcher, and is assigned to all major medical emergencies within its borough. There is one MERV assigned to Divisions 1, 5 and 7 each. Brooklyn no longer has a MERV, while Queens' MERV was lost to a vehicle fire.
- EMS medical evacuation transportation units (METU) are large medical transports able to transport 24 non-ambulatory patients, 32 seated patients, or 10 wheel chair bound patients in the walkway for transport to area hospitals. There is one METU assigned to Divisions 3, 5 and 9 each. All three were purchased with Department of Homeland Security funds.
- EMS mobile respiratory treatment units (MRTU) are similar to METUs, and are also able to treat up to 32 seated patients and transport up to 28 patients for smoke inhalation and other respiratory issues with oxygen, albuterol, and ipratropium bromide. One MRTU is located in Divisions 3, 6, 7 each. All three were purchased with Department of Homeland Security funds.
- EMS logistical support units (LSU) carry medical supplies for use in mass-casualty incidents, as well as two generators, lights, a command tent and an inflatable tent. One LSU is located in Divisions 1, 2, 4, 5 and 8 each.
- Haz-Tac officers are rescue paramedics that respond alongside Haz-Tac and rescue ambulances as the medical component of the FDNY Special Operations Command. There are two of these specially designed units that can also function as EMS condition officers when needed.
- EMS response physicians are emergency physicians with specialized training in hazardous materials, technical rescue, and other specialized prehospital skills such as on-scene limb amputations. The response physician may provide medical control on scene if they respond to day-to-day 911 calls at their discretion, high profile assignments, major mass-casualty incidents or as part of the Rescue Medical Task Force for patients requiring technical rescue or prolonged extrication. The vehicle is also known as the Five Mary Car due to the radio designation Car 5M.

Field Unit Radio Designations

Ambulance radio designations include two numbers followed by a letter and then a tour designation (ex: 46Y2)

- The first and second digit represent the home battalion of the ambulance. (ex: 46Y2 is in FDNY battalion 46).
- The letter following the battalion designation represents the level of care provided by the ambulance. A-O represents a basic life support (BLS) ambulance, H represents a haztac BLS ambulance, P-Q represent a BLS Gator/Polaris unit, S-Y represent an advanced life support (ALS) ambulance, R represents a rescue medic ALS ambulance and Z represents a haztac ALS ambulance.
- The fourth digit represents the tour, or shift, of the ambulance. (ex: 09v1 is the night crew of the unit while 09v2 is the day shift and 09v3 is the evening shift.)
- Paramedic Response Units (PRUs) utilize a flipped-system, with the home battalion being on the opposite side of the letter. Letters P, R, and Z are used. (ex: A PRU in Battalion 14 tour 3 would be Z143.)
  - Rescue Medic PRUs utilize the same system but with the prefix being "X". 5 Rescue Medic units assigned to the 5 Fire Rescue Companies across the city are designated XR1-XR5.
- EMS lieutenants (called conditions bosses) have the designation of Cxxy, with xx being battalion and y being the tour. (ex: Conditions 07 tour 2 would be C072.)
- EMS Captains have the designation Bxx, with xx being battalion. (ex Battalion 35 tour 3 would be B35.) There are no tour numbers for Station Captains.
- EMS physicians have the designation of 5M1 up to 5M12. EMS Response physicians also have the dual-responsibility of being the Medical Director for one of the ten Divisions/Commands, including SOC.

== Apparatus ==
=== Livery ===
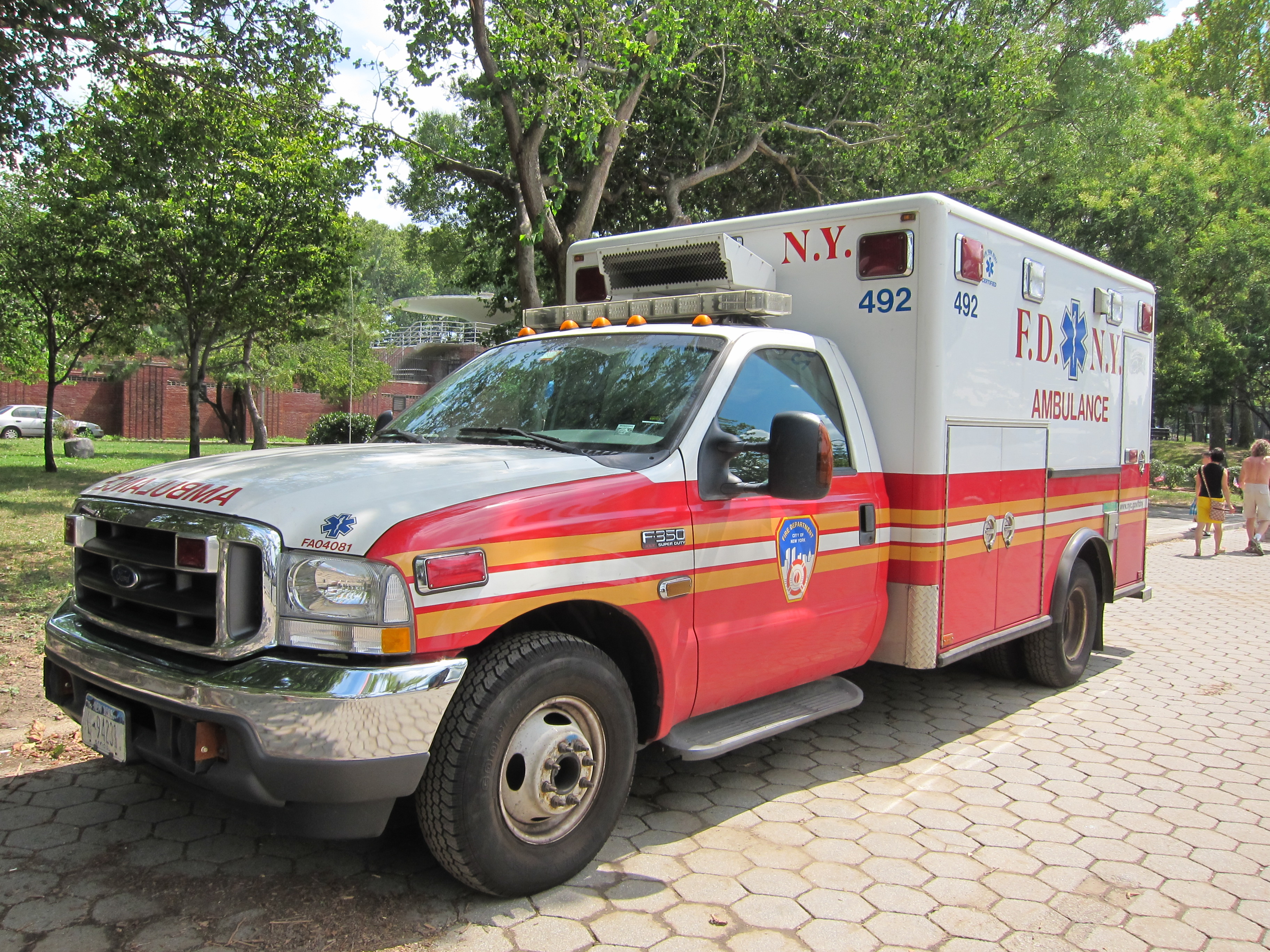
An older 2004 Ford F-350 FDNY Ambulance 492

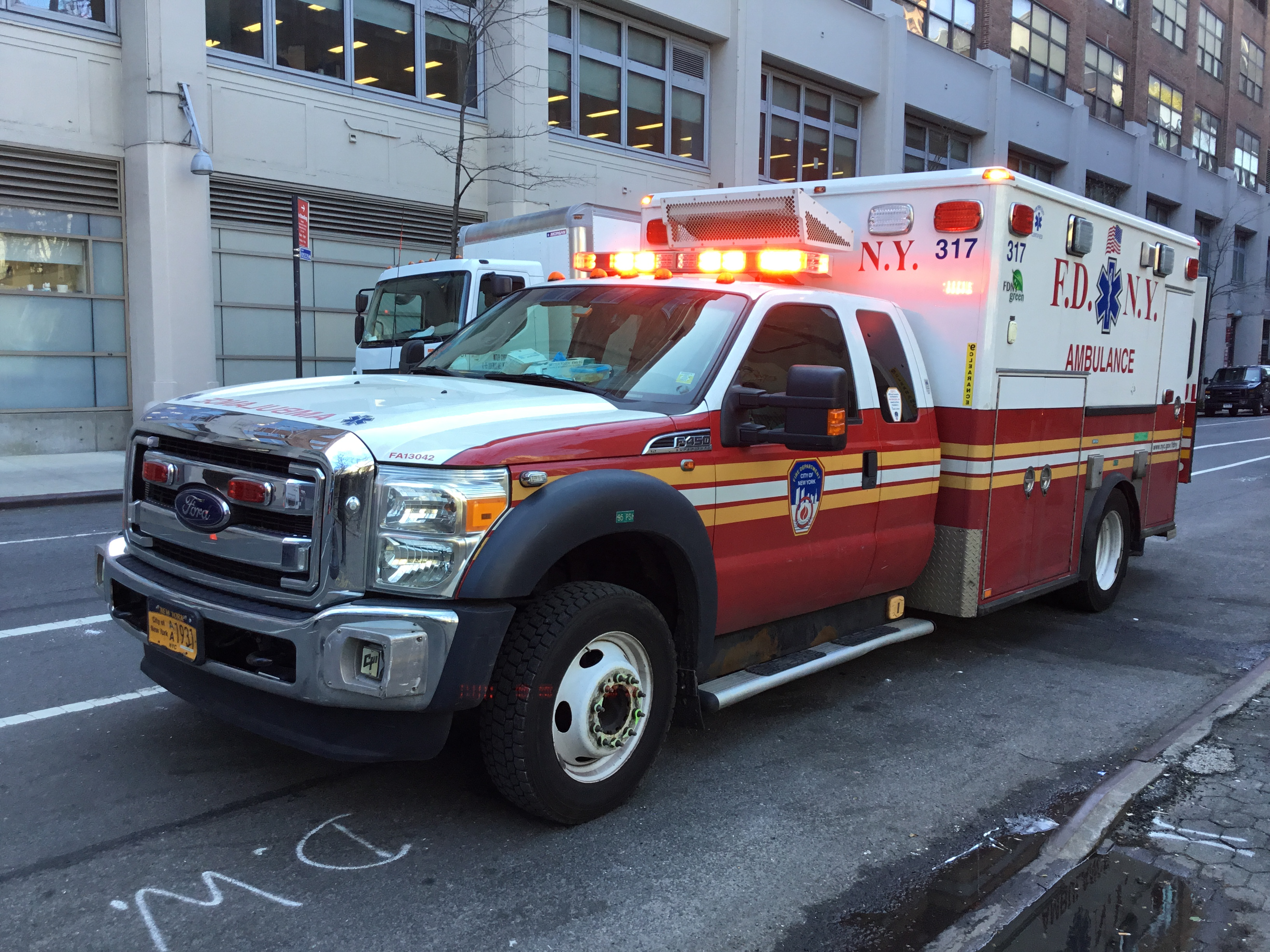
A 2013 Ford F-450 FDNY Ambulance

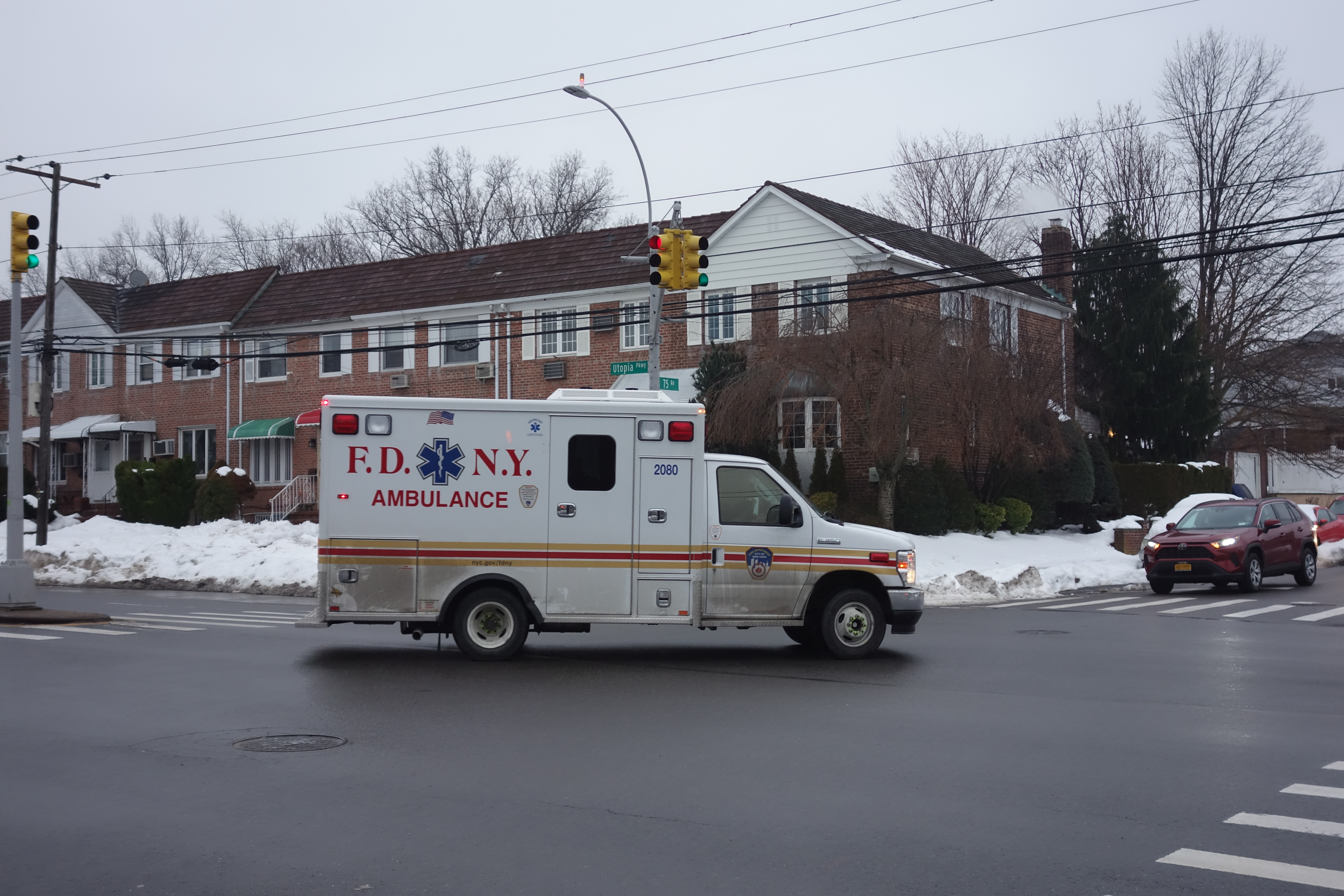
A leased Ford E-350 FDNY ambulance

Immediately after the takeover of NYC EMS from HHC the FDNY changed the livery of the existing ambulances by changing the color the vehicles from predominately white with orange and blue striping to predominately white with blue and red striping. The initials NYC EMS were replaced with the initials FDNY which were placed on the patient compartment of the vehicle with two letters on both sides of an existing Star of Life, with the word ambulance underneath. The driver's side and passenger side doors were also adorned with the new command patch. Subsequent vehicles were ordered in the traditional FDNY livery of white over red with a set of three reflective stripes (gold, white, gold) running down the side. All other markings were kept in place. Later, to improve visibility at night, the rear of the ambulances were painted with reflective red and white chevrons.

=== Vehicles ===
The FDNY Bureau of EMS utilizes custom specification Type I Ambulances, which are based on the chassis-cabs of light and medium duty pickup-trucks. This type was chosen over the Type II ambulance that are based on a passenger/cargo van chassis and the Type III which are based on chassis-cabs of light duty vans due to the ability to fully customize the passenger compartment. Type I ambulances also offer a higher load-capacity and additional compartment space when compared to the two other types. These ambulances are also more resilient to the stresses placed on them in a high volume EMS system in an inner city environment.

In 2011, the FDNY began ordering ambulances from Wheeled Coach which are based on a Dodge Ram 4500 Crew Cab Chassis. The shift to a four-door ambulance was due to the tremendous call volume and harsh 24/7 cycle that the FDNY operates in. Furthermore, the additional cab space provided for crew comfort, additional storage, and the opportunity to have more than two people riding in the forward-facing configuration thus increasing safety if a third crew member is assigned. The department discontinued orders due to issues with the Dodge chassis.

In 2013, the FDNY began ordering a custom Ford F-450 Super Cab/Wheeled Coach Type I ambulance.

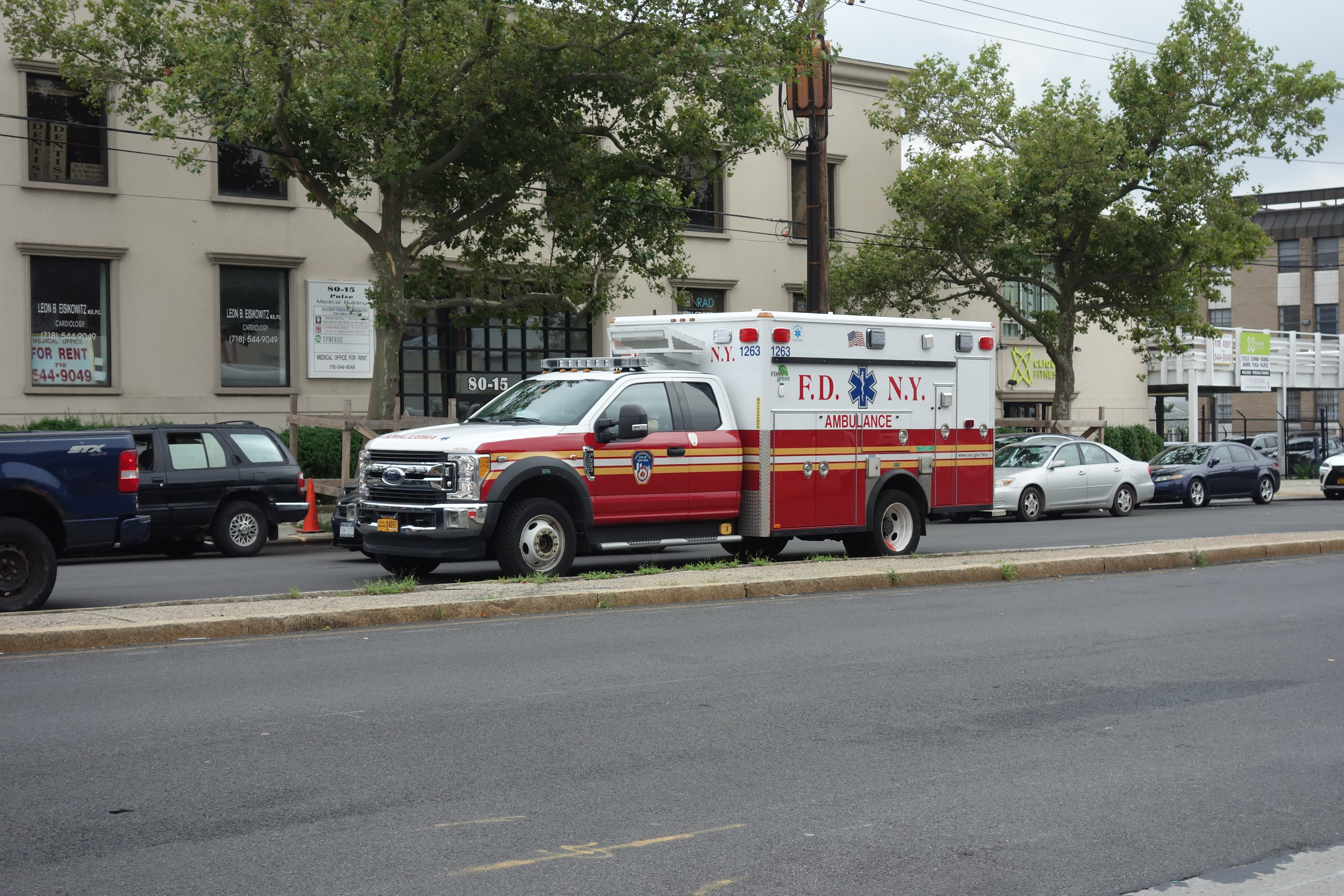
A 2017 Ford F-550 FDNY Ambulance

In 2016, the FDNY began ordering a new version of the F-450/Wheeled Coach ambulances which are labeled "FDNY Green". These use a technology to reduce harmful emissions caused by the necessary idling of ambulances.

In 2016, FDNY EMS ordered and received new International Terra-Star/Wheeled Coach Medium Duty Ambulances for use as "Rescue Medic" vehicles.

In 2017, FDNY EMS began using Ford F-550 Super Duty/Wheeled Coach Type I ambulances.

In 2020, FDNY EMS began to lease ambulances to augment the fleet as call volume increased dramatically. These leased ambulances are identifiable by an all white livery with a set of three reflective stripes (gold, red, gold) in place of the traditional stripes.

== See also ==
- Voluntary Hospital Ambulances
- 9-1-1 Tapping Protocol
