= Voluntary ambulance =

Type of ambulance service in New York City

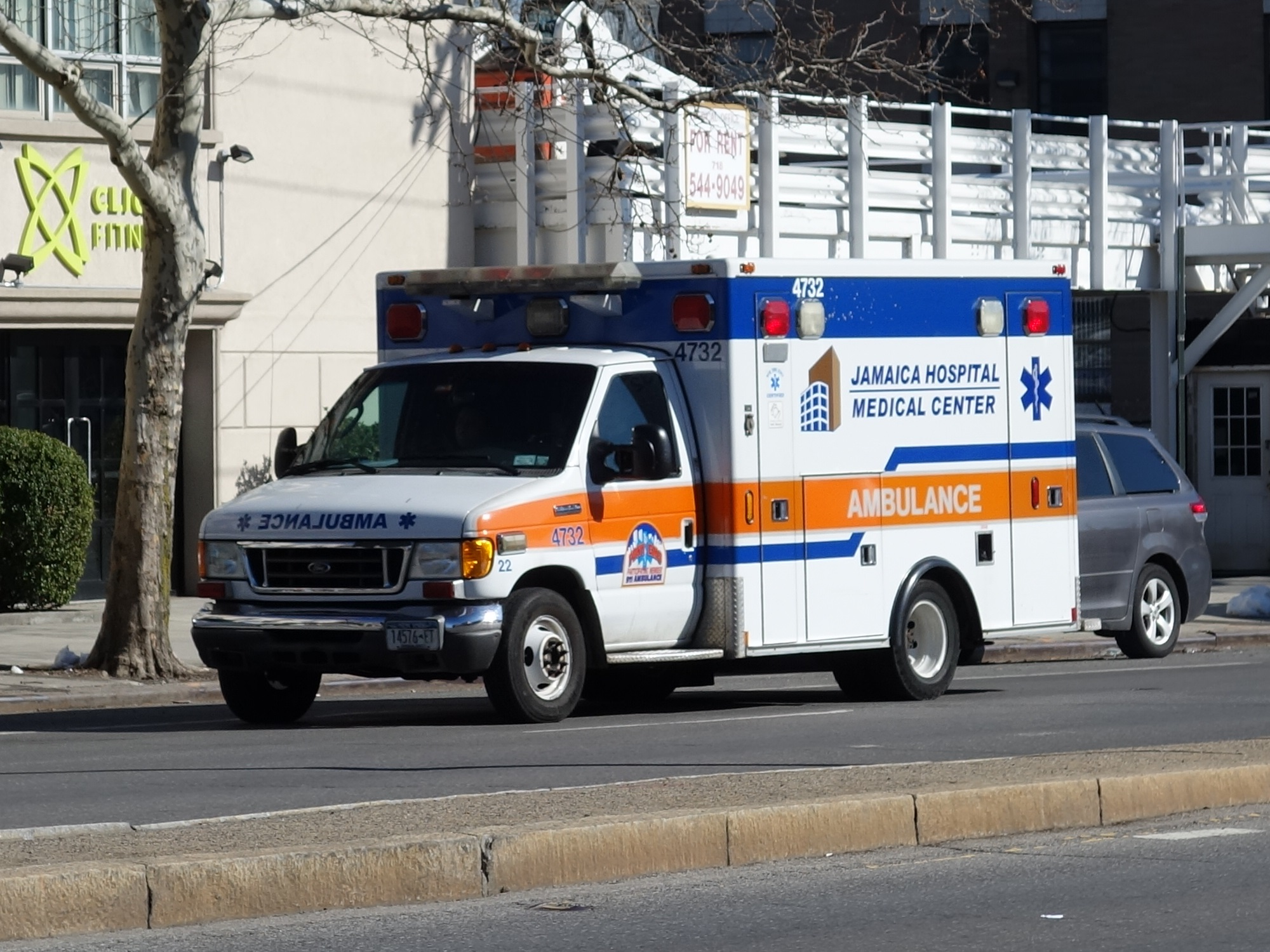
A voluntary ambulance unit in Queens. The insignia on the door reads "FDNY EMS Participating Member 911 Ambulance."

In New York City, a voluntary ambulance is an ambulance operated by a hospital that serves New York City's 911 system. Staffed by personnel employed by the hospital, these ambulances respond to 911 calls at the direction of the New York City Fire Department Bureau of EMS (FDNY EMS) dispatch. The 25 hospitals that participate in the system, also known as voluntary hospitals, provide 37% of ambulance tours in the city. These include the NewYork-Presbyterian, Northwell Health, NYU Langone Health, and Mount Sinai health networks, as well as Jamaica Hospital Medical Center

Voluntary ambulance personnel operate with the same medical guidelines and equipment as FDNY EMS ambulances. They have distinct ambulance markings and uniforms, but display FDNY EMS member insignias on their ambulance doors.

Voluntary ambulances coordinate care with all emergency receiving hospitals in the city, and are required to be neutral with respect to transport destination. Under the Emergency Medical Treatment and Active Labor Act, they are prohibited from preferentially "steering" patients to their own hospitals.

== History ==
In the late 1980s, the EMS division of the New York City Health and Hospitals Corporation (HHC) was unable to handle the full load of 911 calls and asked hospitals to provide ambulances to the 911 system. In 1996, the HHC's EMS division was absorbed by the New York City Fire Department (FDNY) to bring in revenue to avoid closing firehouses.

In December 2010 the Mayor of New York City and the FDNY announced a plan to charge hospitals to participate in New York City's 911 system. The city aimed to collect $8.7 million from the hospitals to help cover the cost of telemetry and emergency medical dispatch. Critics argued that this would have disincentivised voluntary hospitals from contributing in the 911 system and thereby put additional work on the FDNY.

== Popular culture ==
The 1999 supernatural drama film Bringing Out the Dead involves voluntary hospital paramedics in New York City.
