= Socorro Hernandez-Bernasconi =

Mexican-American teacher and activist

- Born: 1941 (age 84–85); Guadalupe, Arizona
- Education: University of Dayton; Texas Tech University
- Occupations: Teacher, activist

Socorro Hernandez-Bernasconi (born 1941) is a Mexican-American teacher and activist. Born and raised in Guadalupe, Arizona, she successfully organized civil action against the Tempe Elementary School District for discrimination against Spanish- and Yaqui-speaking students. Hernandez-Bernasconi has been recognized for her advocacy and community service.

== Early life and education ==
Hernandez-Bernasconi was born in Guadalupe, Arizona, in 1941. After graduating high school, she joined the Community of the Sisters of the Precious Blood, a convent in Dayton, Ohio. While studying to become a nun, she earned her Bachelor of Arts in elementary education from the University of Dayton. After being assigned to an elementary school in Phoenix, Arizona, she was denied transfer back to Guadalupe, and decided to not complete her final vows, allowing her to return to Guadalupe.

Hernandez-Bernasconi started teaching elementary at the Tempe Elementary School District and earned her Masters degree in educational counselling from Texas Tech University in 1970. Hernandez-Bernasconi was one of the first people from Guadalupe to graduate from college and also the first Mexican-American female counselor within the Tempe school district.

== Career ==
While teaching at Tempe, Hernandez-Bernasconi noticed that a large amount of native Spanish- and Yaqui-speaking students were incorrectly enrolled in special education classes. Unable to pass tests administered in English, the school district received higher funding per each child enrolled in special education classes. After informing school administration about this problem, "they refused to look into the matter and instructed her not to say anything about it". In 1971, she brought she a lawsuit against the Tempe school district alleging race and language-based discrimination. The court ruled in her favor and established the "Guadalupe Regulations", requiring that students be tested in their functional language.

Due to her actions, the school district demoted and transferred her to a different school district. She filed suit against the school district in 1973, claiming retaliation. After a finding which declared her transfer was partially due to retaliation but did not provide relief, the U.S. Ninth Circuit Court of Appeals found in her favor in 1977.

In 1990, Hernandez-Bernasconi's son died by suicide after imitating the Russian roulette scene from the film The Deer Hunter. Working at a women's shelter at the time, she left to found Guadalupe Libre Alcohol, Armas & Drogas (GLAAD), a community group that advocates for gun exchanges. GLAAD donates the collected firearms to be turned into tools or artwork.

== Awards and honors ==
- In 1996, Hernandez-Bernasconi received the Petra Foundation Award in honor of her community service
- In 1999, Hernandez-Bernasconi was honored as a Peacemaker by the National Conference on Peacemaking
- In 2002, Hernandez-Bernasconi received the Community Servant-Leadership Award from Arizona State University
- In 2025, Hernandez-Bernasconi was inducted into Arizona Women's Hall of Fame
- In 2025, Guadalupe declared April 24 to be Socorro Hernandez-Bernasconi Day
