= Arizona Fire and Medical Authority =

City department in Arizona

Operational area
- Country: United States
- State: Arizona
- Cities: Sun City West, Buckeye, Tonopah, Sun Lakes, Guadalupe, Wittmann

Agency overview
- Established: 2017
- Annual calls: 31,341 (2025)
- Employees: 189 Firefighters, 96 EMS personnel, 26 Administrative Civilian personnel, 18 Administrative Sworn Personnel (FY 25-26)
- Annual budget: $67,414,433 (FY 25–26)
- Staffing: Career
- Fire chief: Mark Burdick
- EMS level: ALS
- IAFF: 3573

Facilities and equipment
- Battalions: 3
- Stations: 15
- Engines: 10
- Trucks: 1
- Ambulances: 16

Website
- www.afma.az.gov
- local3573.com

Arizona Fire and Medical Authority, often referred to as AFMA, is a fire authority in Maricopa County, Arizona. Comprising three fire districts that came together to form a Fire and Medical Authority, AFMA provides fire protection and emergency medical services to approximately 75,000 people in the communities of Sun City West, Buckeye, Tonopah, Sun Lakes, Guadalupe, and Wittmann. The department is one of 26 jurisdictions within the Phoenix area that is dispatched by the Phoenix Fire Department Regional Dispatch Center and participates in the Automatic Aid system.

== Overview ==
In 2017, the North County and South County Fire & Medical Districts merged to form the Arizona Fire and Medical Authority. This type of merger is known as a Joint Power Authority (JPA) in Arizona, which allows two or more public authorities to come together and share resources while maintaining control of their budgets and tax rates.

The authority is run by the Authority Governing Board, with seven members. Two members from each district are appointed to the Board, with the last member being chosen by the Board.

The agency has gone through numerous mergers since its inception, and although Arizona Fire and Medical Authority remains the official name, battalions are still commonly referred to by their previous district names (North County, South County, Buckeye Valley, etc.).

Approximately 87% of Authority calls are medical. AFMA employs civilian EMTs and paramedics to staff their ambulances.

In 2014, North County became the first fire department in Arizona to receive an ISO Class 1 rating. South County followed suit with their own Class 1 rating in 2019.

The Authority is accredited by the Commission on Fire Accreditation International (CFAI).

=== Mergers ===
In 2022, it was announced that the Buckeye Valley Fire District would become the third fire district to join AFMA. The merger became official in 2023.

On August 28, 2025, the Town of Guadalupe Council voted to sign an Intergovernmental Agreement with AFMA to provide fire and emergency services to the town, thereby replacing the Guadalupe Fire Department and absorbing their firefighters. AFMA began providing services to the town on October 11, 2025.

AFMA was in talks with the Sun City Fire District (SCFD) in regard to a potential merger, with SCFD awaiting a study to determine its feasibility. Upon receiving the feasibility study, the Sun City Fire District board voted to opt out of any potential merger.

=== Flight Helicopter ===
In August 2026, the Authority partnered with PHI Air Medical to establish HALO 321, an air medical response resource. The helicopter will be staffed with a PHI pilot and flight nurse and an AFMA flight paramedic. Based in Buckeye, Arizona, HALO 321 will service the West Valley and provide an opportunity for critical patients to get quicker and advanced care.

== Stations and Apparatus ==
AFMA has 14 stations and 3 administration buildings divided among 3 battalions. The main administration building is located in Sun City West. In mid 2025, the department restructured their battalion numbers to better align with their overall mission. Battalion 10 became Battalion 33, Battalion 23 became Battalion 34, and Battalion 32 remained the same.

=== Battalion 32 (Buckeye Valley) ===
| Fire Station Number | Address | Engine Company | Ladder Company | EMS Medic Transport unit | Command Unit | Specialized Unit |
|---|---|---|---|---|---|---|
| Administration | 6213 S. Miller Rd, Suite 112 | | | | | |
| 321 | 4715 N. 189th Ave | Engine 321 | | Medic 321 | | |
| 322 | 36511 W. Salome Highway | Engine 322 | | | | Brush Truck 322, Water Tender 322 |
| 324 | 25206 W. MC85 | | | Medic 324, Medic 325 | Battalion Chief 321 | |
| 326 | 19937 W. Arlington Rd | Engine 326 | | Medic 326 | | Brush 326, Water Tender 326 |
| 327 | 2816 S. Rainbow Rd | | | Medic 327, Medic 3240, Medic 3241, Medic 3242 | | |
| 328 | 29938 W. Taylor St | Engine 328 | | Medic 328 | | Brush 328, Water Tender 328 |
| 329 | 26127 W. Beardsley Pkwy | | | Medic 329 | | |

=== Battalion 33 (Sun City West) ===
| Fire Station Number | Address | Engine Company | Ladder Company | EMS Medic Transport unit | Command Unit | Specialized Unit |
|---|---|---|---|---|---|---|
| Administration | 18818 N. Spanish Garden Drive | | | | | |
| 331 | 19001 N. Camino Del Sol | Engine 331 | | Medic 331 | Battalion Chief 331 | Rehab 331 |
| 332 | 20622 N. Stardust Blvd | | Ladder 332 | Medic 332 | | |
| 333 | 13431 W. Deer Valley Dr | Engine 333 | | Medic 333 | | Brush Truck 333 |
| 334 | 24930 N. 119th Avenue | Engine 334 | | | | Brush Truck 334, Water Tender 334 |
| 335 | 20303 W. Patton Road | Engine 335 | | Medic 335 | | Brush Truck 335, Water Tender 335 |

=== Battalion 34 (Sun Lakes and Guadalupe) ===
| Fire Station Number | Address | Engine Company | Ladder Company | EMS Medic Transport unit | Command Unit | Specialized Unit |
|---|---|---|---|---|---|---|
| Administration | 25020 S. Alma School Road | | | | | |
| 341 | 25455 S. Sun Lakes Blvd | Engine 341 | | Medic 341 | Battalion Chief 341 | |
| 342 | 25020 S. Alma School Rd | Engine 342 | | Medic 342 | | |
| 343 | 8413 S. Avenida del Yaqui | Engine 343 | | Medic 343 | | |
