= Guadalupe, Arizona =

American town near Phoenix, Arizona

- Town
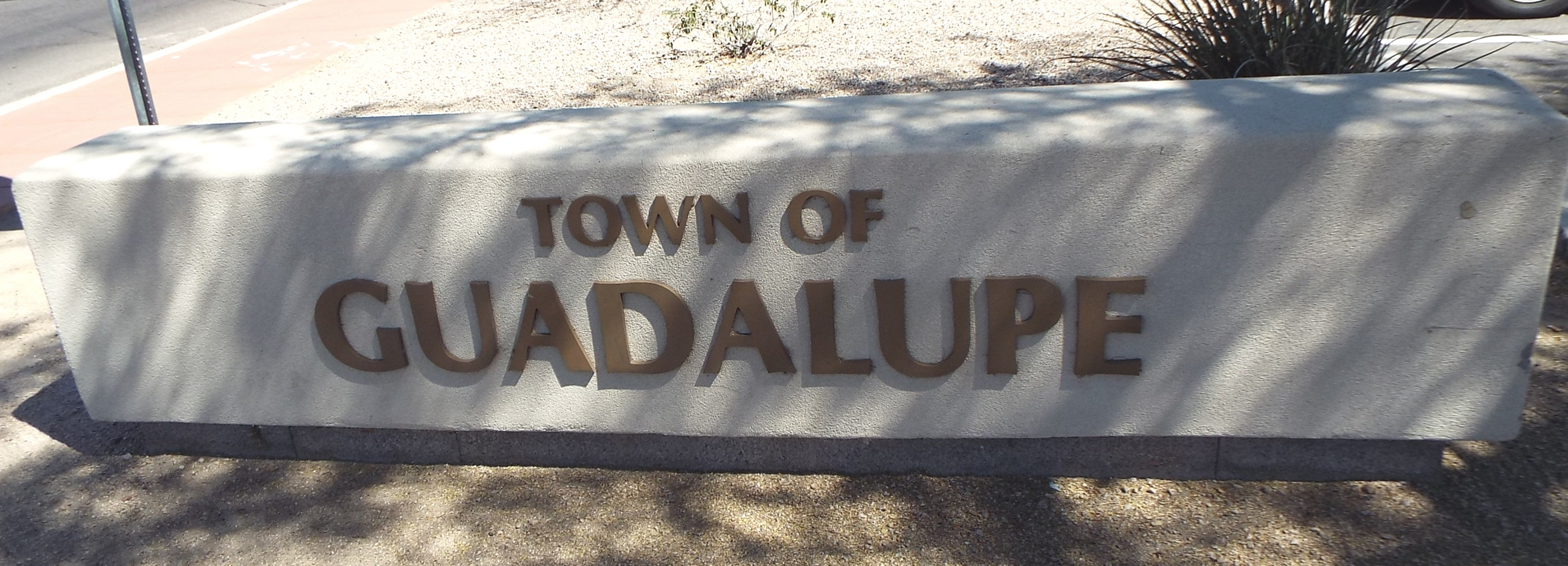
- Welcome marker

- Flag Seal
- Motto: "Where Three Cultures Flourish"
- Location in Maricopa County, Arizona

- Location within Arizona Location within the United States
- Coordinates: 33°22′0″N 111°57′45″W
- Country: United States
- State: Arizona
- County: Maricopa

Government
  - Mayor: Valerie Molina

Area
  - Total: 0.80 sq mi (2.07 km^{2})
  - Land: 0.80 sq mi (2.07 km^{2})
  - Water: 0 sq mi (0.00 km^{2})
- Elevation: 1,234 ft (376 m)

Population (2020)
  - Total: 5,322
  - Density: 6,660.8/sq mi (2,571.74/km^{2})
- Time zone: UTC-7 (MST (no DST))
- ZIP code: 85283
- Area code: 480
- FIPS code: 04-30270
- Website: www.guadalupeaz.org

Guadalupe is a town in Maricopa County, Arizona, United States and part of the greater Phoenix metropolitan area. The town motto, "where three cultures flourish", recognizes the town's roots in the Yaquis, Mexicans and descendants of the original farmers. Since its founding, Guadalupe has been known as a center of Yaqui culture, and it is home to many religious festivals. Nestled between Phoenix and Tempe, the 2020 census listed the population of the town as 5,322. Guadalupe was founded around 1900 by Yaqui Indians, who fled their homeland in Sonora to avoid oppression by the Mexican government of Porfirio Díaz. The cemetery of Guadalupe was established in 1904, in the original townsite. The cemetery is now officially located in Tempe, due to that city's annexation of the land surrounding the cemetery; however, it is still administered by the Guadalupe Clerk's Office. Guadalupe is primarily a residential area; most residents commute to other parts of the Phoenix area to work.

== Geography ==
Guadalupe is located at 33°22′0″N 111°57′45″W (33.366733, -111.962414). It is bordered to the west by Phoenix and to the north, east, and south by Tempe. Downtown Phoenix is 11 miles (18 km) to the northwest.

According to the United States Census Bureau, the town has a total area of 0.8 square miles (2.1 km^{2}), all land.

== Government ==
=== Federal representation ===
Guadalupe is in Arizona's 3rd congressional district, served by Representative Yassamin Ansari.

=== State representation ===
It is also in Arizona's 27th State Legislative District, served by Representatives Reginald Bolding Jr. and Diego Rodriguez, and by Senator Rebecca Ríos. All four of the aforementioned officials are Democrats.

=== Local representation ===
The Town operates under a council-manager government. The Mayor, Vice Mayor, and five Council members all serve four year terms.

Law enforcement services are provided by the Maricopa County Sheriff's Office. Fire services were previously provided by the Guadalupe Fire Department. In August 2025, the Town Council voted to sign an Intergovernmental Agreement with Arizona Fire and Medical Authority to provide fire and emergency services for the town and replace the Guadalupe Fire Department starting October 2025.

== Healthcare ==
The county public hospital system, Valleywise Health (formerly Maricopa Integrated Health System), operates Valleywise Community Health Center – Guadalupe. There are several hospitals near Guadalupe, including HonorHealth Tempe Medical Center near Arizona State University, Banner Desert Medical Center in Mesa, and Valleywise Health Medical Center in Phoenix.

== Demographics ==
=== Racial and ethnic composition ===
Guadalupe town, Arizona – Racial composition Note: the US Census treats Hispanic/Latino as an ethnic category. This table excludes Latinos from the racial categories and assigns them to a separate category. Hispanics/Latinos may be of any race.
| Race (NH = Non-Hispanic) | 2020 | 2010 | 2000 | 1990 | 1980 |
|---|---|---|---|---|---|
| White alone (NH) | 3.7% (198) | 2.4% (133) | 1.5% (76) | 1.6% (85) | 0.2% (8) |
| Black alone (NH) | 2.3% (123) | 1.2% (65) | 0.7% (34) | 0.3% (18) | 0% (0) |
| American Indian alone (NH) | 33.1% (1,760) | 33% (1,820) | 24.5% (1,281) | 24.8% (1,356) | 15.6% (705) |
| Asian alone (NH) | 0.8% (42) | 0% (0) | 0.1% (3) | 0.1% (3) | 0% (0) |
| Pacific Islander alone (NH) | 0.1% (6) | 0% (0) | 0% (0) | | |
| Other race alone (NH) | 0.5% (25) | 0.1% (8) | 0.1% (7) | 0.5% (25) | 0% (0) |
| Multiracial (NH) | 0.8% (44) | 1.1% (60) | 0.9% (45) | — | — |
| Hispanic/Latino (any race) | 58.7% (3,124) | 62.2% (3,437) | 72.3% (3,782) | 72.8% (3,971) | 84.2% (3,793) |

=== 2020 census ===
As of the 2020 census, Guadalupe had a population of 5,322. The median age was 32.1 years. 29.0% of residents were under the age of 18 and 12.9% of residents were 65 years of age or older. For every 100 females there were 97.4 males, and for every 100 females age 18 and over there were 93.4 males age 18 and over.

100.0% of residents lived in urban areas, while 0.0% lived in rural areas.

There were 1,395 households in Guadalupe, of which 51.2% had children under the age of 18 living in them. Of all households, 34.2% were married-couple households, 20.7% were households with a male householder and no spouse or partner present, and 36.7% were households with a female householder and no spouse or partner present. About 19.1% of all households were made up of individuals and 9.5% had someone living alone who was 65 years of age or older.

There were 1,457 housing units, of which 4.3% were vacant. The homeowner vacancy rate was 0.4% and the rental vacancy rate was 3.2%.

The most reported ancestries in 2020 were:

- Mexican (51.8%)
- Pascua Yaqui Tribe of Arizona (29.3%)
- Yaqui (13.9%)
- English (1.8%)
- German (1.3%)
- African American (1.3%)
- Irish (1.1%)

=== 2000 census ===
As of the 2000 census, there were 5,228 people, 1,110 households, and 961 families residing in the town. The population density was 6,813.9 inhabitants per square mile (2,630.9/km^{2}). There were 1,184 housing units at an average density of 1,543.2 units per square mile (595.8 units/km^{2}). The racial makeup of the town was 72.3% Hispanic or Latino of any race, 44.2% Native American, 31.2% from other races, 17.5% White, 1.1% Black or African American 0.1% Asian, 0.2% Pacific Islander, and 5.7% from two or more races.

There were 1,110 households, out of which 44.0% had children under the age of 18 living with them, 49.0% were married couples living together, 27.3% had a female householder with no husband present, and 13.4% were non-families. 9.5% of all households were made up of individuals, and 3.8% had someone living alone who was 65 years of age or older. The average household size was 4.70 and the average family size was 4.88.

In the town, the population was spread out, with 37.2% under the age of 18, 12.5% from 18 to 24, 27.4% from 25 to 44, 16.1% from 45 to 64, and 6.8% who were 65 years of age or older. The median age was 25 years. For every 100 females, there were 105.3 males. For every 100 females age 18 and over, there were 106.9 males.

=== Income and poverty ===
The median home prices as of 2022 is $279,142. In 2022, the average household income was $59,751, and the median income for a family was $42,833. The per capita income for the town was $8,149. About 24.3% of families and 26.7% of the population were below the poverty line, including 30.8% of those under age 18 and 42.4% of those age 65 or over.

Historical population
| Census | Pop. | Note | %± |
|---|---|---|---|
| 1970 | 4,039 | | — |
| 1980 | 4,506 | | 11.6% |
| 1990 | 5,458 | | 21.1% |
| 2000 | 5,228 | | −4.2% |
| 2010 | 5,523 | | 5.6% |
| 2020 | 5,322 | | −3.6% |
U.S. Decennial Census

== Education ==
Most of the town resides within the boundaries of the Tempe Elementary School District and the Tempe Union High School District, with a southern portion being in the Kyrene Elementary School District.

== Art and culture ==
The town observes numerous festivals celebrating religious and cultural events.

=== Easter ceremonies and traditional dances ===
The Yaqui people, also known as Yoeme, migrated to Guadalupe from Mexico. Along with their tribes, they brought ceremonies celebrating Lent and Easter. These ceremonies include deer dances, Pascuala dances, and other traditions originating in Mexico in the early 1600s.

Every Easter season, Yaqui (Pascua in Spanish) ceremonial rites are held in the plaza. The rites blend traditional Native American beliefs with Catholic Christian teachings. These rituals are a historic and sacred obligation of the participants and date back roughly 300 years. Although not performed for tourists, respectful visitors are welcome to observe.

=== Other events ===
In April, there is an annual car show hosted in the town plaza.

Toward the end of the year, the town also celebrates the Feast of Our Lady of Guadalupe and Día de los Muertos. Guadalupe also celebrates National Hispanic Heritage Month from September 15 to October 15 to recognize the Hispanic community's history, culture, and achievements.

== Notable people ==
- Socorro Hernandez-Bernasconi (born 1941), Mexican-American teacher and activist
