= Phoenix Fire Department =

City department in Arizona

Operational area
- Country: United States
- State: Arizona
- City: Phoenix

Agency overview
- Established: 1886
- Annual calls: 242,067 (2024)
- Employees: 2,018
- Annual budget: $561,651,000 (2024-2025)
- Staffing: Career
- Fire chief: Mike Duran III
- EMS level: ALS
- IAFF: 493

Facilities and equipment
- Battalions: 9
- Stations: 60
- Engines: 66
- Trucks: 15
- Squads: 3
- Rescues: 38
- Ambulances: 38
- Tenders: 14
- HAZMAT: 3
- USAR: 1
- Airport crash: 5
- Wildland: 15

Website
- Official website
- IAFF website

The Phoenix Fire Department provides fire protection and emergency medical services for the city of Phoenix, Arizona. The department responded to 242,067 calls during 2024, with 82% being for emergency medical services. The Phoenix Fire Department currently protects 1.5 million residents spread across an area of 520 square miles (1,300 km^{2}). It is dispatched by the Phoenix Fire Department Regional Dispatch Center and is one of 26 jurisdictions that participates in the Automatic Aid system.

== History ==
The Phoenix Fire Department was established as a volunteer fire department on August 17, 1886, with the formation of Engine 1. In 1922 the department transitioned from volunteers to career members. From 1924 to present day, the department created the A, B, and C shifts, which started and ended every third day at 8:00 AM.

On December 9, 1929, the Phoenix Fire Department suffered its first fatality in the line of duty. While responding to a call, Squad 1 and Engine 2 crashed into each other at 14th and Van Buren streets. Captain Jack Sullivan of Squad 1 was killed instantly.

In 1936 the Phoenix Fire Department joined the International Association of Firefighters and formed the union Local 493. The surrounding fire departments, Tempe, Glendale, Chandler, Surprise, and Peoria, are also part of Local 493.

Phoenix fire department engine number 3 in the early 20th century

On June 5, 2021 the Phoenix Fire Department responded to a fire at a recycling facility near 35th Avenue and Lincoln Street. The 6-alarm fire drew more than 200 firefighters to scene from 10 different agencies from across Arizona.

== Stations and apparatus ==
The Phoenix Fire Department is one of the busiest fire departments in the United States. Phoenix currently has 60 fire stations and 9 battalions. Two of the stations are located in the Town of Paradise Valley, who contracts with Phoenix for fire protection. The Phoenix Fire Department has 66 engine companies, 15 ladder companies,38 rescue companies (ambulances) and numerous Administrative,Special and Support Units. Some fire stations have two engine companies. In February 2020, the fire department opened the 9th Battalion in the Central District. Each battalion is directed by one Battalion Chief during each shift. Each district is administered by a Deputy Chief.

The most recent station, #62, opened in February 2025. Future stations include Station 74, which broke ground in October 2024 and Station 51 planned in the far north part of Phoenix.

== FEMA Urban Search and Rescue (US&R) Team Arizona Task Force ==
The Phoenix-based FEMA Urban Search and Rescue Team Arizona Task Force 1 (or AZ-TF1) is a FEMA Urban Search and Rescue Task Force sponsored by the Phoenix Fire Department.

AZ-TF1 is one of 28 such FEMA US&R Rescue Teams with numerous disaster response capabilities such as search and rescue, hazardous material detection and decontamination, structural collapse rescue, technical search, emergency triage and medicine, live find and human remains detection canines, and disaster recovery. The Federal Emergency Management Agency created the geographically positioned teams in an effort to provide support for large-scale disasters in both the United States and the potential international response abroad. In recent years the FEMA US&R system has developed the ability for a modular response in the event a specific capability is needed during a disaster response. An example of this would be a swift-water rescue team needed to augment the current search and rescue assets already deployed. FEMA provides the financial, technical and training support for all 28 teams as well as manage an internal auditing system to verify and validate each team's ability to provide a standardized response of both personnel and equipment. AZ-TF1 is one of six task forces in the nation to be certified with training for WMD (Weapons of Mass Destruction) related incidents. AZ-TF1 is also the only task force in the US to have armed police officers respond with them. This has however led to controversy and suspension of service during 2005 Hurricane Katrina. AZ-TF1 had armed officers deployed alongside firefighters to protect them against armed looters. This in turn led to a break in FEMA's rules about firearms. AZ-TF1 was sent home with the then-Phoenix Mayor Phil Gordon saying it is outrageous.

=== Deployments ===
Noteworthy AZ-TF1 deployments include:

- 1994 Northridge earthquake, Los Angeles County, California
- 1995 Oklahoma City bombing, Oklahoma City, Oklahoma
- 2001 World Trade Center, New York City, New York
- 2002 Winter Olympics, Salt Lake City, Utah
- 2003 Space Shuttle Columbia disaster
- 2005 Hurricane Katrina
- 2008 Hurricanes Gustav/Ike
- 2014 Oso mudslide
- 2017 Hurricane Harvey/Irma/Maria
- 2018 Hurricane Florence
- 2024 Hurricane Helene

== Line of Duty Deaths ==
Since its inception, the Phoenix Fire Department has had 11 firefighters die in the line of duty.

Name of Firefighter	Title	Last Alarm	Apparatus Placement	Cause of Death
John D. "Jack" Sullivan	Captain	December 9, 1929	Squad 1	Struck by another truck en route to a commercial structure fire.
Ambrose Shea	Firefighter	December 10, 1929	Squad 1	Struck by another truck en route to a commercial structure fire.
Randolf J. "Randy" Potts	Firefighter	August 6, 1974	Engine 11-B	Crushed by a falling wall at a commercial structure fire.
Walter D. Kelson	Engineer	March 12, 1977	Engine 23-A	Drowned trying to save drowning children at Lake Pleasant. The children survived.
Chauncey E. Ray Jr.	Firefighter	March 12, 1977	Engine 23-B	Drowned trying to save drowning children at Lake Pleasant. The children survived.
Dale R. Lockett	Firefighter	August 5, 1979	Engine 25-A	Fell through a roof during a fire.
Ricky S. Pearce	Engineer-HazMat Technician	November 15, 1984	Ladder 4-B	Spontaneous explosion while working in a worker-trapped confined space rescue storage tank.
Timothy J. Hale	Engineer	February 12, 1994	Engine 15-A	Crushed by a truck while unloading a gurney from the back of the ambulance.
Bret R. Tarver	Firefighter Paramedic	March 14, 2001	Engine 14-C	Became disoriented and ran out of air while interior of a 5-alarm supermarket fire.
Mark S. Carter	Engineer Paramedic	June 4, 2007	Engine 37-A	Found in cardiac arrest inside of a fire truck by a civilian.
Bradley C. Harper	Firefighter	May 19, 2013	Rescue 21-B	Pinned between his ambulance and a fire truck during a mulch fire.

== See also ==
- Hall of Flame Fire Museum
