= Tempe Fire Medical Rescue Department =

City department in Arizona

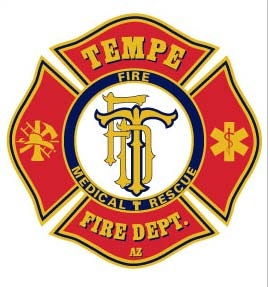

Operational area
- Country: United States
- State: Arizona
- City: Tempe

Agency overview
- Established: 1903
- Annual calls: 29,009 (FY 22-23)
- Employees: 242
- Annual budget: $50,842,982 (2021)
- Staffing: Career
- Fire chief: Darrell Duty (Interim)
- EMS level: ALS
- IAFF: 493

Facilities and equipment
- Battalions: 1
- Stations: 7
- Engines: 8
- Trucks: 2
- Ambulances: 6
- HAZMAT: 1

Website
- Official website
- IAFF website

The Tempe Fire Medical Rescue Department (TFMRD) is a fire department that provides fire protection and emergency medical services for the city of Tempe, Arizona. The department services approximately 181,000 people over a 40-square-mile (100 km^{2}) area, which includes Arizona State University. During fiscal year 2023–2024, TFMRD responded to 24,368 calls for service, of which 84% were for medical services. The department is one of 26 jurisdictions within the Phoenix area that is dispatched by the Phoenix Fire Department Regional Dispatch Center and participates in the Automatic Aid system.

== History ==
The Tempe Fire Department was officially established in 1903, following several large fires within the city in previous years. As the city began expanding, so did the fire department. The department began receiving new equipment and firefighters began getting paid on a "per-call" basis. Tempe firefighters at this time were still volunteers. Soon, the public began calling for a more "professional" fire department. In 1960, a new fire chief was hired with the goal of reorganizing the department. The department began hiring paid firefighters shortly after. All Tempe firefighters were officially certified as state Emergency Medical Technicians (EMTs) in 1981. In 1993, the department partnered with Arizona Public Service to open a joint fire training center.

In 2014, the department changed its name from Tempe Fire Department to Tempe Fire Medical Rescue Department. City officials stated that the new name better represented the department's services.

In 2016, the department received a Certificate of Necessity from the Arizona Department of Health Services, which allowed them to start their own ambulance transportation within the city. The department began emergency medical transportation service using non sworn civilian personnel in 2017.

== Stations and apparatus ==
The department currently has seven fire stations.

Fire Station	Address	Engine Company	Ladder Company	EMS Medic Transport unit	Command Unit	Specialized Unit
271	1450 E. Apache Blvd.	Engine 271, Engine 278		Medic 271	Battalion Chief 271	Squad 278
272	3025 S. Hardy Drive	Engine 272		Medic 272		Hazmat 272, Low Acuity 272
273	5400 S. McClintock Drive	Engine 273	Ladder 273, Ladder Tender 273			
274	300 E. Elliot Road	Engine 274		Medic 274		
275	723 E. Curry Road	Engine 275				Fire Boat 271
276	655 S. Ash Avenue	Engine 276	Ladder 276, Ladder Tender 276	Medic 276		Special Ops 276
277	8607 S. McClintock Drive	Engine 277				Utility 277

== Specialties ==
There are numerous specialty groups within and in partnership with the Tempe Fire Medical Rescue Department.

=== CARE 7 ===
CARE 7 is a 24/7 crisis response team within the city of Tempe. Members are employed by the City of Tempe and work alongside the police and fire departments to assist community members during high stress or traumatic events.

CARE 7 members may respond to domestic violence incidents, auto accidents, sexual and physical assaults, suicides, homicides, residential fires, drownings, and other unexpected deaths or injuries.

=== Emergency medical services ===
Upon receiving a Certificate of Necessity from the Arizona Department of Health Services, TFMRD was allowed to start providing their own ambulance transportation service within the city of Tempe. The ambulances are staffed by non sworn civilian EMTs and paramedics. These employees work and live alongside firefighters at the fire stations, but do not have the same responsibilities as them. Civilian employees do not fight fires, they are only involved in medical incidents and transport.

=== Hazardous Materials Response Team ===
The Hazardous Materials Response Team is stationed out of Station 272 and is responsible for calls involving possible hazardous materials. Members must complete a 200-hour course in order to be certified and complete roughly 50 hours of continuing education every year after that.

=== Technical Rescue Team ===
The Technical Rescue Team trains for various types of rescue scenarios, including, but not limited to, rescues involving confined spaces, high angle/low angle rope rescues from rough terrain, trench rescues, structural collapses, swift water rescues, and industrial accidents. They are also trained in SCUBA responses due to the close proximity of Tempe Beach Park. Members must complete a 200 hour course in order to be certified and complete roughly 50 hours of continuing education every year after that.

== Line of duty deaths ==
Since its inception, the Tempe Fire Medical Rescue Department has had four line of duty deaths

Name of Firefighter	Title	Last Alarm	Cause of Death
Ed Gaicki	Firefighter Paramedic	January 15, 1980	Roof collapse
Tommy Alexander Arriaga	Firefighter	March 6, 2020	Occupational cancer
Scott Leatham	Captain Paramedic	December 19, 2024	Occupational cancer
John Garza	Firefighter Paramedic	November 7, 2025	Cancer
