= Dispatcher =

Communications worker who coordinates wider operations

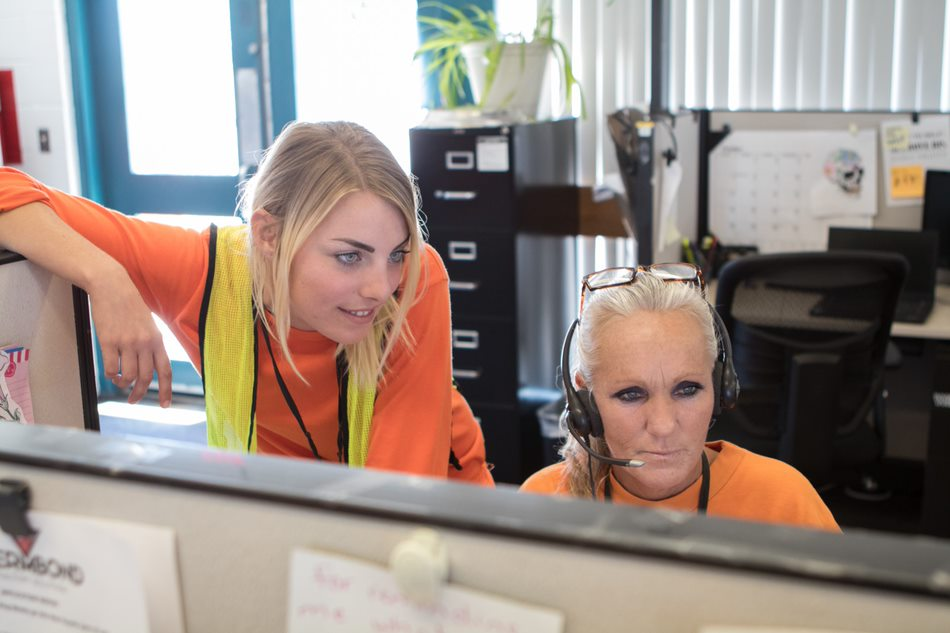
A dispatcher

A dispatcher is a communications worker who dispatches, i.e., receives and transmits information to coordinate operations of other personnel and vehicles carrying out a service. Emergency organizations including police departments, fire departments, and emergency medical services departments as well as civilian organizations such as motorcycle couriers, taxicab providers, trucking companies, railroads, bus systems, and public utility companies, use dispatchers to relay information, direct personnel, and coordinate their operations.

== Types of dispatchers ==
=== Emergency dispatchers ===
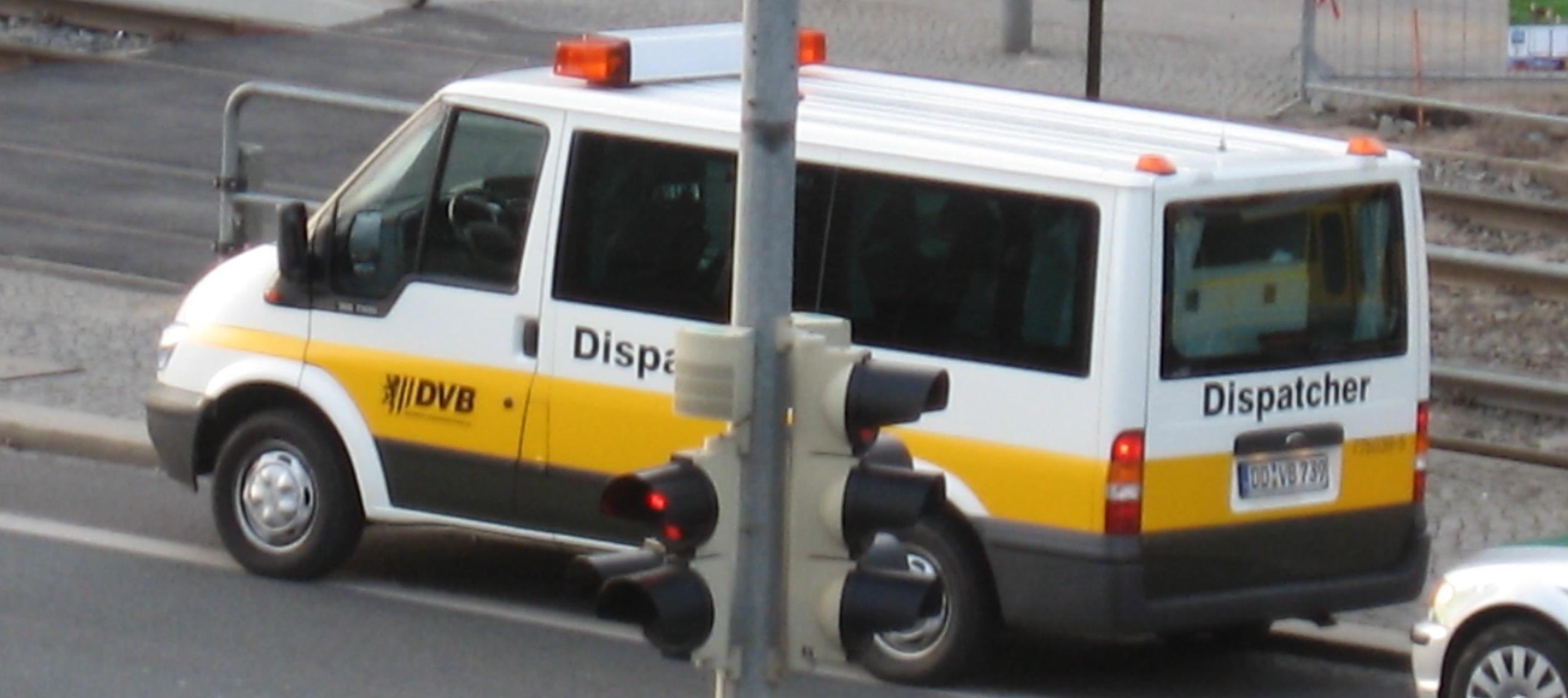
A dispatcher in Germany at work with an accident involving a tram

An emergency dispatcher, also known as public safety dispatcher, 9-1-1 dispatcher, or public safety telecommunicator receives calls from individuals who require emergency services, including police services, firefighting, and emergency medical services. Once information is obtained from the caller, the dispatcher activates the appropriate services necessary to respond to the nature of the call for help. The dispatcher also obtains and relays pertinent information to the field units to help ensure the adequacy and safety of the response.

Emergency dispatchers may use preapproved protocols to talk a caller or bystander through lifesaving medical procedures such as cardiopulmonary resuscitation, childbirth, and first aid. They may require certification.

In the United States, about 10% of all dispatchers employed in 2004 were public safety dispatchers.

=== Transportation and service dispatchers ===
A number of other organizations use dispatchers to respond to service calls, coordinate transportation schedules, and to organize the delivery of materials:

- A truck dispatcher is employed by a trucking company to monitor the delivery of freight over long distances and coordinate delivery pickup and drop-off schedules.
- A bus dispatcher monitors the schedules of their bus fleet and address any problems that arise during their operations.
- A tow-truck dispatcher responds to calls for emergency roadside assistance.
- A gas and water service dispatcher monitors their respective utilities and receive calls for emergency assistance that involve gas lines and water mains.
- A train dispatcher uses flags or other means to signal to the driver it is clear to depart, ensuring passenger safety.

In the United States, about 26% of all dispatchers employed in 2004 worked for transportation and warehousing industries.

=== Railroad dispatchers ===
A train dispatcher is employed by a railroad to direct and facilitate the movement of trains over an assigned territory, which is usually part, or all, of a railroad operating division. The dispatcher is also responsible for cost effective movement of trains and other on-track railroad equipment to optimize physical (trains) and human resource (crews) assets.

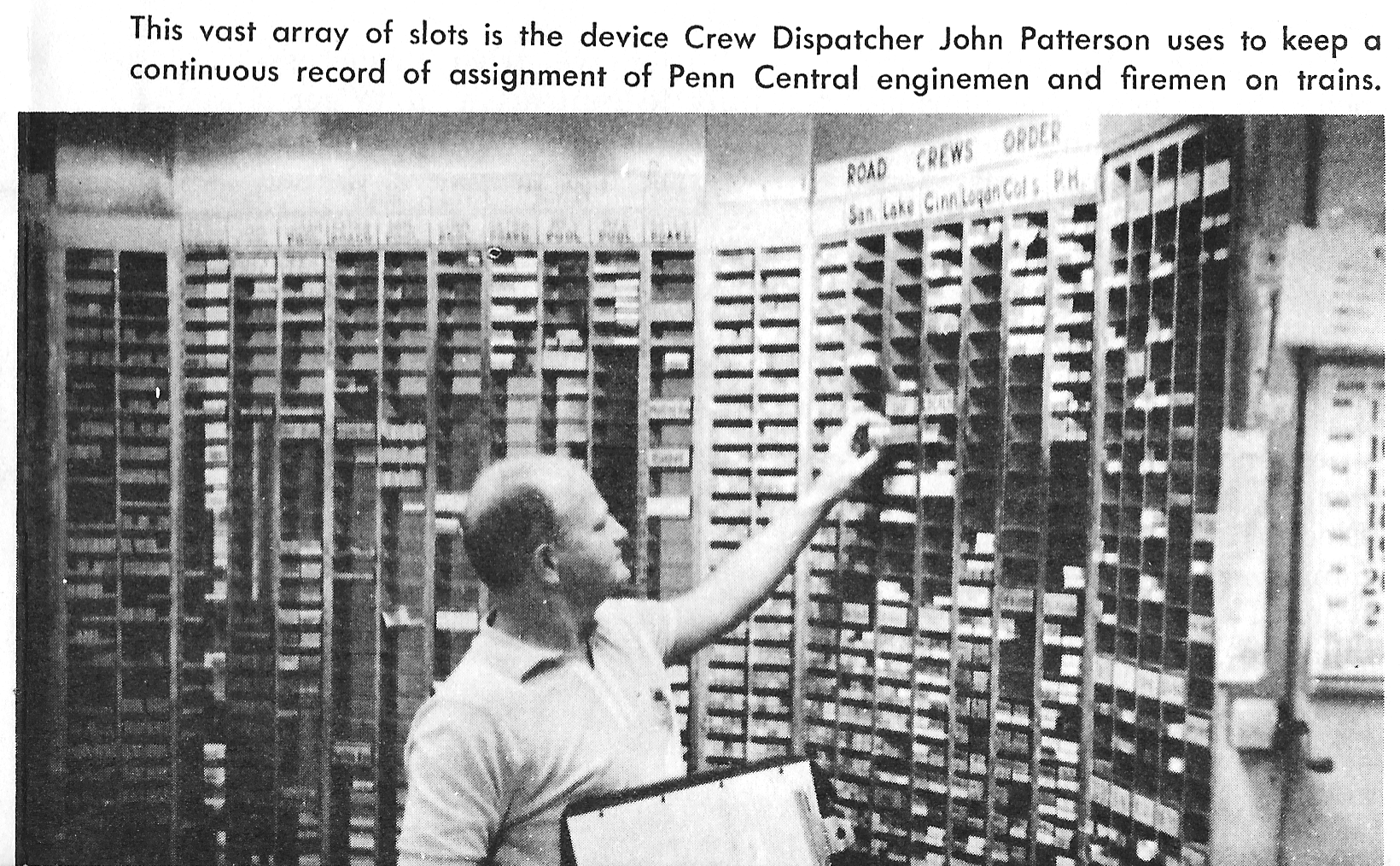
A crew dispatcher keeping track of train crew assignments in Penn Central

A crew dispatcher is also employed by the railroad to keep track of train crews and their assignments. The crew dispatcher is responsible for assigning train crew to trains based upon scheduled rosters, and also making real-time adjustments as necessary based on rail traffic conditions and delays. The crew dispatcher is normally assisted by a crew caller whose responsibility is to telephone the train and engine crews to advise them of time to report for duty. The crew dispatcher is also responsible for checking that each train and engine crew are properly qualified for their assignments and have had proper rest according to labour regulations.

=== Airline or flight dispatchers ===
A flight dispatcher assists in planning flight paths, taking into account wind speed, storms, aircraft performance and loading, and other conditions. Some dispatchers provide a flight following service and advise pilots if conditions or paths change. They usually work in the operations or control center of the airline.

== Working conditions and environment ==
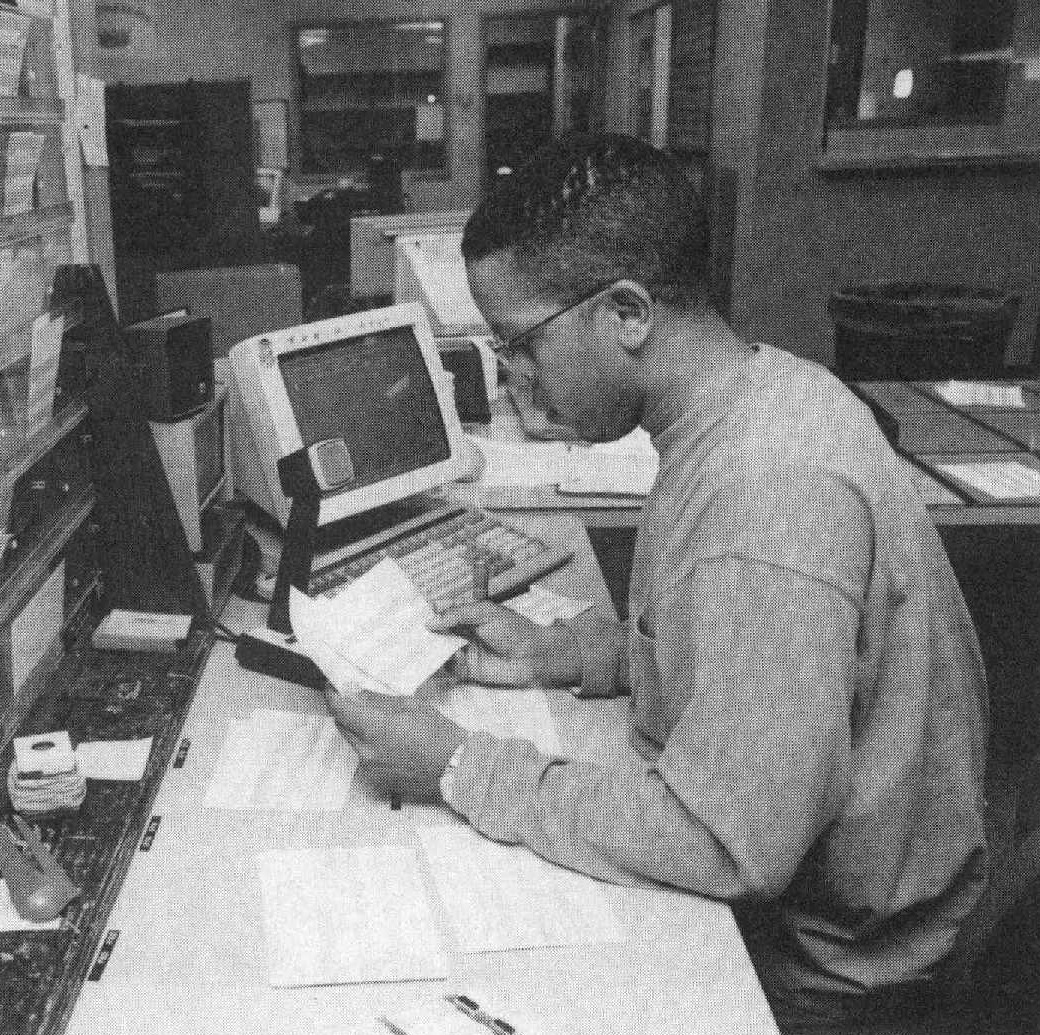
Dispatcher at work. (1992)

Dispatchers are responsible for monitoring all of the communications within a specific geographic area. Public safety dispatchers are responsible for all emergency communications that occur within the jurisdiction of their department. These workers receive and document incoming calls, transmit messages to appropriate personnel, and keep logs of the daily activities of their personnel. Public safety dispatchers usually work in a police station, a fire station, or a hospital. Other dispatchers work in centralized communication centers associated with their specific company or service.

Dispatchers of all kinds work with multiple communications systems depending on their function. These systems can include but not limited to telephones, radios, computers and computer-aided dispatch programs, video surveillance cameras, and ground-to-aircraft messaging systems such as ACARS. As a result of sitting for long periods and using such equipment, dispatchers can develop eye strain and back problems. Many dispatchers must also work irregular hours to provide 24-hour service, which includes night, weekend, and holiday hours.

Public safety dispatchers are usually the first point of contact between emergency services and the public. When receiving incoming calls for help, these dispatchers must ascertain the nature, location, and extent of the emergency. Callers requesting emergency assistance are often in a state of heightened emotional distress, which can make it difficult to obtain the information needed to handle the call appropriately. The working conditions of a public safety dispatcher may be particularly stressful compared to others because handling a call incorrectly may delay or misdirect emergency personnel, which could result in serious injury or even death.

Human error can also produce deadly results for other types of dispatchers. A train dispatcher in Spain was found guilty of negligent homicide for a head-on train collision that occurred in June 2003. Nineteen people died and forty-eight were injured in a crash where the dispatcher allowed a passenger train to leave a station when a freight train was approaching the station on the same line.

== Training and employment ==
Employment as a dispatcher does not usually require a level of education higher than a high school diploma, but many that work in the field hold liberal arts degrees. Employers prefer candidates with computer and clerical skills, communication skills, and the ability to work fast under pressure.

Candidates for employment as public safety dispatchers may be required to pass written, oral, or performance tests and are governed by state or local regulations. Public safety dispatchers may also have to obtain certifications and attend additional training before or after they are employed by state or local governments to dispatch for police, fire, or emergency medical services. The level of training required for these dispatchers is typically the most extensive in comparison to other dispatch positions.

A standard certification requirement for public safety dispatchers is Terminal Operator certification for access to the US Federal Bureau of Investigation (FBI) National Crime Information Center (NCIC) database system. Access to this database system often allows additional access to the state-level system comparable to NCIC which allows public safety dispatchers to access motor vehicle registration and drivers license information as well as wants or warrants by various law enforcement agencies both statewide and national.

In addition to certifications, specialized training is also required or appropriated to public safety dispatchers. As public safety dispatchers are the first contact made between the public and emergency services, public safety dispatchers need to be able to extract a vast array of information out of the caller. Such specialized training for 911 dispatchers can include: suicide intervention, hostage negotiation, bomb threats, tactical dispatching (for SWAT teams), domestic violence and domestic and foreign terrorism countermeasures. Many are also trained as emergency medical dispatchers, able to give first aid instructions to victims or families prior to EMS arrival.

According to the United States Bureau of Labor Statistics, 266,000 people were employed as dispatchers in 2004. In addition, it is expected that a number of current dispatchers will either transfer to other occupations or leave the labor force, which will result in an increase of openings.

== Hardware ==
The primary tool of the dispatcher is the dispatch console. A dispatch console is a system that interfaces to a private or public radio system, allowing the dispatcher to communicate directly with all field workers, police officers, EMS personnel, and others in order to coordinate their activities. Dispatchers use various hardware and software to create dispatch.

== See also ==
- Air traffic controller
- Civil defense
- Military
- Paramilitary
- Emergency medical dispatcher
- Police radio
- Radio scanner
