= Medical Priority Dispatch System =

Medical emergency rating system

Star of Life

The Medical Priority Dispatch System (MPDS), sometimes referred to as the Advanced Medical Priority Dispatch System (AMPDS) is a unified system used to dispatch appropriate aid to medical emergencies including systematized caller interrogation and pre-arrival instructions. Priority Dispatch Corporation is licensed to design and publish MPDS and its various products, with research supported by the International Academy of Emergency Medical Dispatch (IAEMD). Priority Dispatch Corporation, in conjunction with the International Academies of Emergency Dispatch, have also produced similar systems for Police (Police Priority Dispatch System, PPDS) and Fire (Fire Priority Dispatch System, FPDS)

MPDS was developed by Jeff Clawson from 1976 to 1979 when he worked as an emergency medical technician and dispatcher prior to medical school. He designed a set of standardized protocols to triage patients via the telephone and thus improve the emergency response system. Protocols were first alphabetized by chief complaint that included key questions to ask the caller, pre-arrival instructions, and dispatch priorities. After many revisions, these simple cards have evolved into MPDS.

MPDS today still starts with the dispatcher asking the caller key questions. These questions allow the dispatchers to categorize the call by chief complaint and set a determinant level ranging from A (minor) to E (immediately life-threatening) relating to the severity of the patient's condition. The system also uses the determinant O which may be a referral to another service or other situation that may not actually require an ambulance response. Another sub-category code is used to further categorize the patient. The system is often used in the form of a software system called ProQA, which is also produced by Priority Dispatch Corp.

== Call Prioritization ==
Each dispatch determinant is made up of three pieces of information, which builds the determinant in a number-letter-number format. The first component, a number from 1 to 36, indicates a complaint or specific protocol from the MPDS: the selection of this card is based on the initial questions asked by the emergency dispatcher. The second component, a letter A through E (including the Greek character Ω), is the response determinant indicating the potential severity of injury or illness based on information provided by the caller and the recommended type of response. The third component, a number, is the sub-determinant and provides more specific information about the patient's specific condition. For instance, a suspected cardiac or respiratory arrest where the patient is not breathing is given the MPDS code 9-E-1, whereas a superficial animal bite has the code 3-A-3. The MPDS codes allow emergency medical service providers to determine the appropriate response mode (e.g. "routine" or "lights and sirens") and resources to be assigned to the event. Some protocols also utilise a single-letter suffix which may be added to the end of the code to provide additional information, e.g. the code 6-D-1 is a patient with breathing difficulties who is not alert, 6-D-1A is a patient with breathing difficulties who is not alert and also has asthma, and 6-D-1E is a patient with breathing difficulties who is not alert and has emphysema/COAD/COPD.

=== Protocols ===
1. Abdominal Pain/Problems
2. Allergies (Reactions) / Envenomations (Stings, Bites)
3. Animal Bites / Attacks
4. Assault / Sexual Assault / Stun Gun
5. Back Pain (Non-Traumatic / Non-Recent)
6. Breathing Problems
7. Burns (Scalds) / Explosions
8. Carbon Monoxide / Inhalation / HAZMAT / CBRN
9. Cardiac or Respiratory Arrest / Death
10. Chest Pain
11. Choking
12. Convulsions / Seizures
13. Diabetic Problems
14. Drowning / Diving / SCUBA Accident
15. Electrocution / Lightning
16. Eye Problems / Injuries
17. Falls
18. Headache
19. Heart Problems / A.I.C.D.
20. Heat / Cold Exposure
21. Hemorrhage / Lacerations
22. Inaccessible Incident / Entrapments
23. Overdose / Poisoning (Ingestion)
24. Pregnancy / Childbirth / Miscarriage
25. Psychiatric / Suicide Attempt
26. Sick Person
27. Stab / Gunshot / Penetrating Trauma
28. Stroke (CVA) / Transient Ischemic Attack (TIA)
29. Traffic / Transportation Incidents
30. Traumatic Injuries
31. Unconscious / Fainting (Near)
32. Unknown Problem (Collapse 3rd Party)
33. Inter-Facility Transfer / Palliative Care
34. Automatic Crash Notification (A.C.N.)
35. HCP (Health-Care Practitioner) Referral (United Kingdom only)
36. Pandemic / Epidemic / Outbreak (Surveillance or Triage)
37. Inter-Facility Transfer specific to medically trained callers

==== Protocol 36 ====
This Protocol was created to handle the influx of emergency calls during the H1N1 pandemic: it directed that Standard EMS Resources be delayed until patients could be assessed by a Flu Response Unit (FRU), a single provider that could attend a patient and determine what additional resources were required for patient care to reduce the risk of pandemic exposure to EMS Personnel. In March 2020 the protocol was revised to assist with mitigating the COVID-19 pandemic.

=== Response Determinant ===
| Type | Capability | Response Time |
|---|---|---|
| Alpha | Basic Life Support | Cold non-Lights & Sirens |
| Bravo | Basic Life Support | Hot Lights & Sirens |
| Charlie | Advanced Life Support | Cold Non Lights & Sirens |
| Delta | Advanced Life Support | Hot Lights & Sirens |
| Echo | Advanced Life Support and special units | Hot (Multiple units) plus other first responders, e.g. Fire |

== Instructions to the caller ==
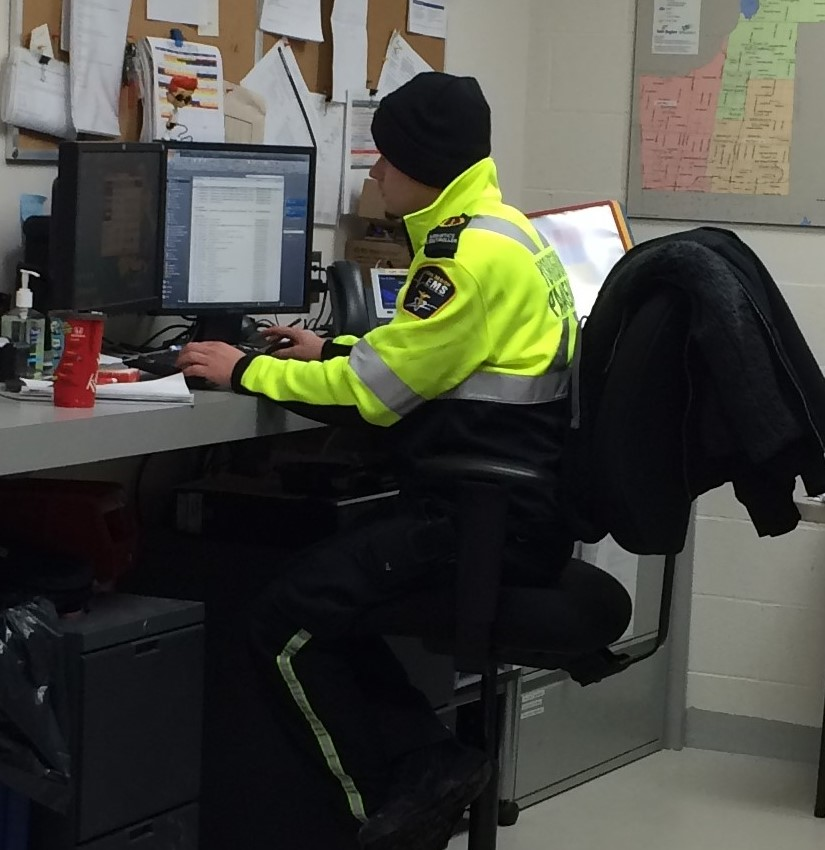
EMS utilizing MPDS

As well as triaging emergency calls, MPDS also provides instructions for the dispatcher to give to the caller whilst assistance is en route. These post-dispatch and pre-arrival instructions are intended both to keep the caller and the patient safe, but also, where necessary, to turn the caller into the "first first responder" by giving them potentially life-saving instructions. They include:

- cardiopulmonary resuscitation for adults, children, babies, and newborns
- the use of a defibrillator
- the use of the Heimlich manoeuvre to clear the airway of a choking patient
- delivery of a baby
- extinguishing the flames for a person on fire
- escaping from a sinking vehicle
- bleeding control
- flushing of chemical contamination
- cooling of burns
- administration of epinephrine/adrenaline autoinjectors
- administration of Narcan/naloxone

== Responses in the United Kingdom ==
Whilst MPDS uses the determinants to provide a recommendation as to the type of response that may be appropriate, some countries use a different response approach. For example, in the United Kingdom, most, but not all front-line emergency ambulances have advanced life support trained crews, meaning that the ALS/BLS distinction becomes impossible to implement. Instead, each individual response code is assigned to one of several categories, as determined by the Government, with associated response targets for each.

=== Response Determinant NHS England Clinical Response Model ===
| Type | Also known as | Severity | Response | Target Response Time |
|---|---|---|---|---|
| Category 1 | Purple | Life Threatening Illnesses or Injuries | Nearest Advanced Life Support Crew* | Within 7 minutes on average, within 15 minutes 90% of the time |
| Category 2 | Red | Emergency Calls | Emergency Ambulance Response** or Clinical Callback within 20 minutes | Within 18 minutes on average, within 40 minutes 90% of the time |
| Category 3 | Yellow | Urgent Calls | Emergency Ambulance Response or Clinical Callback within 60 minutes | Within 2 hours 90% of the time |
| Category 4 | Green | Less Urgent Calls | Non-emergency Ambulance Response | Within 3 hours 90% of the time |
| Category 5 | Teal | Less Urgent Calls | Telephone Triage within 120 minutes or Referral to other service | N/A |

* This may include an emergency ambulance, a rapid response car, ambulance officers, or specialist crews e.g. HART. Other basic life support responses may also be sent, e.g. Community First Responder.

** If an emergency ambulance is unlikely to reach the patient within the average response time, a rapid response car and/or Community First Responder may also be dispatched.

The exact nature of the response sent may vary slightly between Ambulance Trusts. Following a Category 2, 3, or 5 telephone triage, the patient may receive an ambulance response (which could be Category 1-4 depending on the outcome of the triage), may be referred to another service or provider, or treatment may be completed over the phone.

In an independent report into the emergency response to the Manchester Arena bombing, an Advanced Paramedic for the North West Ambulance Service stated it was "very much understood" that MPDS "vastly underemphasises the priority of traumatic calls."

=== Response Determinant NHS Wales Pilot Clinical Response Model ===
| Letter | Severity | Details | Response |
|---|---|---|---|
| RED | Immediately Life Threatening | Multiple Vehicle Dispatch - Lights and Siren | Emergency Response |
| AMBER 1 and 2 | Life-Threatening / Serious Calls | Lights and Siren | Emergency Response |
| GREEN 2 and 3 | All other calls | Face-to-face response - Clinical telephone assessment | Non-Emergency Response |

== See also ==
- Emergency service response codes
- Ten-code
