= Emergency medical dispatch =

System for emergency dispatchers to quickly send medical services

Emergency Medical Dispatch (EMD) refers to a system that enhances services provided by Public Safety Answering Point (emergency) call takers, such as municipal emergency services dispatchers. It does so by allowing the call taker to quickly narrow down the caller's type of medical or trauma situation, so as to better dispatch emergency services, and provide quality instruction to the caller before help arrives.

== Overview ==
Based on specific question-and-answer logic trees ("systematized interrogation"), the dispatcher is able to determine a problem type and priority for the call, and use that information to

- provide systematized Pre-Arrival Instructions, including
  - Dispatch Life Support (DLS), which gives phone instruction to aid the patient until help arrives
  - provide other information to the caller
- activate appropriate protocols
  - dispatch the call to the appropriate resources
  - dispatch using the appropriate modes (emergency mode or normal driving)
  - activation of secondary protocols, such as notifications

== Implementation ==
Many countries have a national EMD or DLS program, sometimes with a designated system provider, either mandatory or optional. Others may have a national curriculum or accreditation program, or the program may be designated by local jurisdictions at the state or province level. Not all jurisdictions have any sanctioned EMD or DLS system in place, and not all emergency call centers have EMD or DLS. There is some controversy over using these systems, especially when non-medical staff man the phones.

EMD may be guided by computer software, or flashcard-books (often color-coded, with page cross references to help further narrow down the phone diagnosis and/or treatment, and dispatch protocol). Such manual systems have been likened to recipe cards.

The dispatch effort guided by EMD may indicate call severity, resource type (basic life support or paramedics), declaration of a multiple casualty incident (MCI), responder emergency mode (e.g., permission to use lights and sirens), call priority, and hospital or health department notification.

The on-phone instruction effort guided by EMD may help the caller or other bystander to perform CPR or other lay basic life support, provide instruction on how to aid the responders to reach the patient, evacuation instructions, or other forms of care or safety instruction.

== Adopted programs ==
In the United States, the Medical Priority Dispatch System (MPDS), Criterion-Based Dispatch, and Computer aided call handling (CACH) are common protocols.

In the United Kingdom, AMPDS is one of two Department of Health and Social Care approved computer programs for 999/112 medical emergency call triage; used across Scotland, Wales, Northern Ireland and parts of England. In England, NHS Pathways is the alternative system and it is used by five of the eleven regional ambulance services.
