= List of emergency telephone numbers =

In many countries, dialing either 112 (used in Europe and parts of Asia) or 911 (used mostly in the Americas) will connect callers to the local emergency services. However, not all countries use those emergency telephone numbers. The emergency numbers in the world (but not necessarily all of them) are listed below.

112; 911; 999; 110; 117; 17; 100; 119; 1122; 113; 191; 10 111; Other, unique number

== Africa ==
Country	Police	Ambulance	Fire	Other numbers
Algeria	1548	14		Gendarme – 1055
Angola	113	112/116	115	
Ascension Island	999			
Benin	117	112	118	
Burundi	117	112	118	
Botswana	999	997	998	Mobile phones – 112.
Burkina Faso	17	112	18	
Cameroon	112			Police – 117; Ambulance – 119; Fire – 118; Electricity emergency – 8010.
Cape Verde	132	130	131	
Central African Republic	117	1220	118	
Chad	17	2251-4242	18	Ambulance – 2251-1237.
Comoros	17	772-03-73	18	Ambulance – 773-26-04.
Republic of Congo	117		118	
Democratic Republic of Congo	112		118	
Djibouti	17	19	18	
Egypt	112 or 122	123	180	Tourist police – 126; Traffic police – 128; Electricity emergency – 121; Gas emergency – 129; Mobile phones – 112.
Equatorial Guinea	114	115	112	Traffic police – 116.
Eritrea	113	114	116	Emergency call – 112; Traffic police – 115.
Eswatini	999	977	933	
Ethiopia	911			Police – 991; Ambulance – 907; Fire – 939; Traffic police – 945.
Gabon	1730	1300	18	
Gambia	117	116	118	Police – 112; Electricity emergency – 124; Water emergency – 125.
Ghana	112			Police – 191; Ambulance – 193; Fire – 192.
Guinea	117	18	442-020	Maritime Emergency Service – 19; Gendarmerie – 118; National Gendarmerie – 122
Guinea-Bissau	112			Police – 117; Ambulance – 119; Fire – 118.
Ivory Coast	110 or 111 or 170	185	180	
Liberia	911			
Kenya	112 or 999 or 911			
Libya	1515			Ambulance – 193.
Lesotho	123	121	122	
Madagascar	117	124	118	Traffic police – 3600.
Malawi	997	998	999	Police – 990.
Mali	17	15	18	Ambulance – 112, Fire – 112.
Mauritania	117	101	118	Gendarmerie – 116; Traffic police – 119.
Mauritius	112	114	115	Police – 999; Fire – 995.
Mayotte	112			Police – 17; Ambulance – 15; Fire – 18.
Morocco	19	15		Royal gendarmerie – 177; Drugs & alcohol service – 113; Racial discrimination hotline – 114; Non-emergency disturbances – 110; General information – 160; National Freeway call center – 5050; Mobile phones – 112.
Mozambique	119	117	198	
Namibia	10 111	depends on town/city		
Niger	17	15	18	
Nigeria	112			
Réunion	112			Police – 17; Ambulance – 15; Fire – 18.
Rwanda	112	912	112	Traffic police – 113.
Saint Helena	999			
Sao Tome and Principe	112			
Senegal	17	18	1515	
Seychelles	112 or 999			Police – 133; Ambulance – 151.
Sierra Leone	019	999		
Somalia	888	999	555	Traffic police – 777.
South Africa	10 111	10 177		Emergency in Cape Town – 107; Mobile phones – 112.
Sudan	999			Traffic police – 777 777.
South Sudan	999			
Tanzania	112	114	115	Police – 999; Health call centre - 199
Togo	117	8200	118	
Tristan da Cunha	999	911	999	
Tunisia	197	190	198	National guard – 193.
Uganda	112	911	112	Police – 999; Fire – 999.
Western Sahara	150			
Zambia	999			Police – 911; Ambulance – 992; Fire – 993; Mobile phones – 112.
Zimbabwe	999			Police – 995; Ambulance – 994; Fire – 993; Mobile phones – 112.

== Caribbean ==
Country	Police	Ambulance	Fire	Notes
Anguilla	911			
Antigua and Barbuda	911 or 999			
Aruba	911			
The Bahamas	911 or 919			Mobile phones – 112.
Barbados	211	511	311	
Bermuda	911			
British Virgin Islands	911 or 999			Police – 311.
Caribbean Netherlands	911			
Cayman Islands	911			
Cuba	106	104	105	
Curacao	911	910 and 912	911	Calls to 112 forward to 911. Please consult the current list for Emergency Services
Dominica	999			
Dominican Republic	911			112 redirects to 911 on mobile phones.
Grenada	911			
Guadeloupe	112			Police – 17; Ambulance – 15; Fire – 18.
Haiti	114	116	115	Police – 122.
Jamaica	119	110		
Martinique	112			Police – 17; Ambulance – 15; Fire – 18.
Montserrat	911 or 999			
Puerto Rico	911			
Saint Barthélemy	17		18	
Saint Kitts and Nevis	911			
Saint Lucia	911 or 999			
Saint Martin	17	15	18	
Saint Vincent and the Grenadines	999 or 911 or 112			
Sint Maarten	911	912	919	
Trinidad and Tobago	999 or 911	811	990	
Turks and Caicos	911			
U.S. Virgin Islands	911			

== Central America ==
Country	Police	Ambulance	Fire	Notes
Belize	911			
Clipperton Island	112			Police – 17; Ambulance – 15; Fire – 18.
Costa Rica	911			Mobile phones – 112.
El Salvador	911	132	913	
Guatemala	110	122 CBV (national) 123 CBM (municipal local only); 1554 ASOBOMBD (municipalities associations, national)		Red Cross – 125 limited coverage; Conred – 119 Disaster relief (national).
Honduras	911	195	198	
Nicaragua	118	128	115	Fire – 911.
Panama	911			Police – 104; Fire – 103.

== North America ==
Country	Police	Ambulance	Fire	Notes
Canada	911			Suicide hotline – 988; Nonemergency social services - 211. Municipal services – 311 (metros only). 112 may redirect to 911 on certain mobile phones.
Mexico	911			Emergency – 911; Anonymous complaint – 089.
Saint Pierre and Miquelon	112			Police – 17; Ambulance – 15; Fire – 18.
United States of America	911			Suicide hotline – 988; Text-to-9-1-1 is available in many regions and will respond with an error anywhere else. Various services available through regional or national N11 codes (e.g.: 211 and 311 for non-emergency police or city services) in certain areas. Calling #77 from a mobile phone may reach the highway patrol in some states. Calling 112 from a mobile phone may redirect to 911 in some states/localities, but emergency officials recommend callers use the standard 911.

== South America ==
Country	Police	Ambulance	Fire	Notes
Argentina	911			Police – 101; Ambulance – 107; Fire – 100; Civil defense – 103; Forest fire – 105; Coast guard – 106. 112 redirects to 911 on mobile phones.
Bolivia	911			Police – 110; Ambulance – 118; Fire – 119; Civil protection – 114; National police – 120.
Brazil	190	192	193	Federal highway police – 191; Federal police – 194; Civil police – 197; State highway police – 198; Civil defense – 199; Municipal guard – 153; Human rights – 100; Emergency in Mercosul area – 128. 112 and 911 redirect to 190 on mobile phones; 188 – Hotline Help.
Chile	133	131	132	Useful mnemonic is ABC123: Ambulancia (Ambulance) – 131, Bomberos (Fire) – 132, Carabineros (Police) – 133. 911 and 112 redirect to 133.
Colombia	112	125	119	General emergency - 123; Anti-kidnapping and extortion hotline – 165.
Ecuador	911			Police – 101; Ambulance – 131; Fire – 102; Emergency in Guayaquil – 112; Traffic police in Guayaquil – 103.
Falkland Islands	112 or 999			
French Guiana	112			Police – 17; Ambulance – 15; Fire – 18.
Guyana	911	913	912	Childcare Protection Agency – 227-0979; Human Trafficking – 227-4083, 623-5030; Domestic Violence – 914.
Paraguay	911			Police – 912; Ambulance – 141; Fire – 132.; Rescue – 131
Peru	911			Police – 105; Ambulance (SAMU) – 106; Fire – 116; Civil defense – 115; Domestic violence – 100.
South Georgia and the South Sandwich Islands	999			
Suriname	115			Police – 115; Ambulance – 113; Fire – 110.
Uruguay	911			Police – 109; Ambulance – 105; Fire – 104.
Venezuela	911 and 171			

== Antarctica ==
Country	Police	Ambulance	Fire	Notes
Antarctica	(United States) McMurdo Station: 911 (fire and medical emergency dispatch)			

== Asia ==
Country	Police	Ambulance	Fire	Notes
Abkhazia	102	103	101	
Afghanistan	119	112	119	
Bahrain	999			Mobile phones – 112, Traffic police – 199, Coast Guard – 994.
Bangladesh	999			Anti Corruption Commission – 106, Agricultural Information Services – 16123, Health Services – 16263, Dhaka WASA – 16162, Women and Children Ministry – 109, Legal Services – 16430, National Information Service — 333, IEDCR Helpline for COVID-19 – 10655
Bhutan	113	112	110	
British Indian Ocean Territory	112 or 999			
Brunei	993	991	995	Search and Rescue – 998
Cambodia	117	119	118	Child helpline – 1280
People's Republic of China	110	120	119	Traffic accident reports – 122; Coast guard – 95110
Christmas Island	000			
Cocos (Keeling) Islands	000			
East Timor	112			
Hong Kong	999			Mobile phones – 911 or 112 (Automatically redirects to 999).
India	112			Gas leakage – 1906; Tourist Helpline – 1363; Child Helpline – 1098; Disaster management – 104; Women Helpline – 181; Police – 100; Ambulance – 108; Fire brigade – 101
Indonesia	112			Police – 110; Ambulance – 118 or 119; Fire – 113 or 1131; Search & rescue – 115; Natural disasters – 129; Electricity emergency – 123; Mental health – 1-500-454.
Iran	110	115	125	General emergencies is also 110. Social Emergency – 123; Roads Traffic Information Center – 141; Iranian Red Crescent – 112 (non-mobile phones). 112 and 911 redirect to 110 on mobile phones.
Iraq	112 or 911			Police – 104; Ambulance – 122; Fire – 115.
Israel	100	101	102	Israel Electric Corporation – 103; Home Front Command – 104; Online child abuse hotline – 105; Non-emergency municipal hazards – 106; Non-emergency police inquiries – 110; Mobile phones – 112.
Japan	110	119		Coast guard – 118; Information about emergencies – #7119 free call; Information about emergencies – #9110 pay call; Roadside assistance – #8139. 112 and 911 redirect to 110 on mobile phones and telephones that are present at all United States military installations.
Jordan	911			Mobile phones – 112.
Kazakhstan	112			Police – 102; Ambulance – 103; Fire – 101; Gas leaks – 104.
(North Korea) Democratic People's Republic of Korea	local numbers only		110 (Note: The number is rarely used as it is unknown by the people living in North Korea.) or 8119	
(South Korea) Republic of Korea	112	119		Non Emergency – 110; National security – 111; Reporting spies – 113; Narcotics Report – 127; Lost and Found Center – 182; Travel Hotline – 1330.
Kuwait	112			
Kyrgyzstan	112			
Laos	191	195	190	
Lebanon	999 or 112	140	175	Police – 160; Civil defense – 125.
Macau	999			From mobile phones – 110 or 112 (all redirects to 999); Judiciary Police – 993
Malaysia	999			From mobile phones – 112
Maldives	911			Police – 119; Ambulance – 100; Fire – 118; Coastguard – 191; For Natural Disasters – 115.
Mongolia	105			Police – 102; Ambulance – 103; Fire – 101.
Myanmar	999			Police – 199; Ambulance – 192; Fire – 191 (can also call for Natural disasters) Highway police – 1880; Relief – 067-340-4222 (Ministry hotline); International hotline – 122; COVID-19 hotline – 2019.
Nepal	100	102	101	Traffic police – 103; From mobile phones – 112.
Oman	9999			From mobile phones – 112.
Pakistan	15	115 and 1122	16	Ambulance – 1122; Traffic police – 1915; Mobile phones – 112; Punjab Women's toll free helpline – 1043; Tourist police – 1422; National Highways & Motorway Police – 130; Child Protection & Welfare Bureau – 1121.
Palestine	100	101	102	
Philippines	911			Child abuse (Bantay Bata) – 163; Human trafficking – 1343; From mobile phones – 112
Qatar	999			Mobile phones – 112.
Saudi Arabia	911			Police – 999; Ambulance – 997; Fire – 998; Traffic police – 993.
Singapore	999	995		Mobile phones – 112 or 911; Non-emergency ambulance – 1777; Police hotline – 1800 255 0000; Traffic police – 6547 0000.
South Ossetia	102	103	101	
Sri Lanka	119	110		Traffic police – 112 691 111.
Syria	112	110	113	Traffic police – 115.
Republic of China (Taiwan)	110	119		112 on mobile phones – after call is connected 0 redirects 110 and 9 redirects 119; Domestic violence – 113; Coast guard – 118
Tajikistan	112			Police – 102; Ambulance – 103; Fire – 101; Gas leaks – 104.
Thailand	191	1669	199	It's been proposed that the number 1669 be discontinued and be replaced with 191. However, as of 2026, the number 191, 199 and 1669 remain available. Ambulance (Bangkok only) – 1646; Tourist police – 1155; Traffic control center (Bangkok Metro only) – 1197; Highway patrol – 1193; Mobile Phones – 112.
Turkey	112 or 911 or 153	112 or 911		Municipal police – 153 (112 connects to national police); Gas emergency and outages – 187; Electricity emergency and outages – 186; Water emergency and outages – 185; Non-emergency medical consultation - 184; Child abuse and family violence – 183; Telephone emergency and outages – 121; Poison control – 114. 911 automatically connects to 112. Current service is the result of consolidation of firefighter, emergency police, Gendarmerie, Coast Guard, forest fire, search and rescue, natural disaster and medical emergency numbers into medical emergency former solo number 112.
Turkmenistan	02	03	01	For mobile phones: Fire - 001; Police - 002; Ambulance - 003; Gas leak - 004. For gas leaks - 04 on landline.
United Arab Emirates	999	998	997	Coast guard – 996; Non-emergency police – 901; Water failure – 922; Electricity failure – 991
Uzbekistan	102	103	101	Emergency service – 1050; Gas leaks – 104; Housing and communal services – 1055. 112 is being introduced as the number for all emergencies on 1 January 2024 in Uzbekistan by the end of 2024.
Vietnam	113	115	114	111 – Child abuse, 112 – Livesaving services
Yemen	194	191		

== Europe ==
Country	Police	Ambulance	Fire	Notes
Akrotiri and Dhekelia	112 or 999			
Åland Islands	112			Non-emergency police – 018 527 100; Poison control – 09 471 977.
Albania	129	127	128	Traffic police – 126; Emergency at sea – 125. Mobile phones ambulance – 112
Andorra	110	116	118	112 – Mountain / Sky Rescue collaboration with Spanish (Catalan) and French authorities
Armenia	112 or 911			Police – 102; Ambulance – 103; Fire – 101; Gas emergency – 104; Traffic police – 177; Search & rescue – 108.
Austria	112 or 133	144	122	Gas emergency – 128; Mountain rescue – 140; Doctors – 141; Crisis hotline – 142; Support for children and teens – 147; Non-emergency police – 059 133; Deaf fax/SMS – 0800 133 133; Poisoning Informations Center – 01 406 43 43. The emergency telephone number 112 will be answered by the police, but will also handle other emergency services.
Azerbaijan	112 or 102	112 or 103	112 or 101	Gas Service – 104; Traffic police – 902; Electricity emergency – 199; Emergency – 112.
Belarus	102	103	101	Gas emergency – 104.
Belgium	101 or 112	112		Non-emergency number for the fire department – 1722.
Bosnia and Herzegovina	122	124	123	Civil protection – 121.
Bulgaria	112 or 166	112 or 150	112 or 160	
Croatia	112 or 192	112 or 194	112 or 193	Search and rescue at sea – 112 or 195; Road help – 1987.
Cyprus	112 or 199			Air/sea rescue – 1441; Anti-drug support – 1410 or 1498; Poison control – 1401.
Czech Republic	112 or 158	112 or 155	112 or 150	Municipal police – 156; Mountain rescue – 1210.
Denmark	112			Non-emergency police – 114.
Estonia	112			
Faroe Islands	112			Non-emergency police – 114.
Finland	112			+358 9 2297 0908 from abroad; Maritime rescue – 02 94 1000; Poison Control – 0800 147 111; Medical Helpline – 116 117 (except in Åland); Report lost or stolen credit card – 020 333 (for most Finnish banks)
France	17	112 or 15	112 or 18	Deaf FAX/SMS – 114; Hotline for beaten children – 119; Missing children – 116 000; Maritime rescue – 196. in 80% of departments 112 will redirect to fire and rescue service in the rest of cases 112 will be handled either by a common platform or by ambulance (SAMU)
Georgia	112			
Germany	110	112		Traditionally 110 for the police and 112 for the fire brigade and rescue service. Due to EU Directive 112 works also for the police; 911 redirects to 112 on telephones used in USAFE bases. Rescue service additionally (outdating) 19222. Non-emergency medical on-call duty: 116 117. Debit and credit card locking call 116 116. Military police: 0800 190 9999. Federal (incl. railway) police: 0800 6 888 000.
Gibraltar	199 or 112 or 999	190 or 112 or 999		
Greece	100 or 112	166 or 112	199 or 112	European emergency service line – 112; Coast guard – 108; National Child Protection Helpline – 1056; European Hotline for Missing Children – 116000; EU Helpline for Children and Teenagers – 116111
Greenland	112			Mobile phones only. From landline phones dial the local police station, hospital or fire brigade.
Guernsey	112 or 999			
Hungary	112 or 107	112 or 104	112 or 105	Water emergency – 1817.
Iceland	112			Non-emergency police Reykjavík area – 444 10 00; 911 redirects to 112 on mobile phones; +354 570 2112 from abroad.
Ireland	112 or 999			SMS messages can be sent to 112.
Isle of Man	112 or 999			
Italy	112			The 112 was originally the national emergency number of the Carabinieri; it is now the European single emergency number; NUE 112 is operational throughout Italy (except Veneto and Campania). In areas where the NUE is operational, calls to the traditional emergency numbers 113 (Police), 115 (Fire), 118 (Ambulance) are routed to the 112 emergency response centre. Other numbers: Child abuse – 114; Financial Gendarmerie – 117; Forest service – 1515; Anti-violence and anti-stalking service – 1522; Environmental emergency – 1525; Coast guard – 1530.
Jersey	112 or 999			
Kosovo	192	194	193	
Latvia	112			Police – 110; Ambulance – 113; Gas emergency – 114.
Lithuania	112			Police – 022; Ambulance – 033; Fire – 011.
Liechtenstein	117	144	118	
Luxembourg	112			Police – 113.
Malta	112			
Moldova	112			
Monaco	17	112 or 18	112 or 18	112 and 18 redirects to fire and rescue service which can also handle ambulance service
Montenegro	122 or 112	124 or 112	123 or 112	Emergency at sea: 129
Netherlands	112			Text phone – 0800 81 12; Non-emergency police – 0900 88 44 (Note: Can't be accessed from foreign telephone lines) or 0343 578 844; Non-emergency police (text phone) – 0900 18 44; Suicide prevention – 0800-0113; Animal emergency – 144; Child abuse – 0900 123 12 30; Anti-bullying hotline – 0800 90 50.
North Macedonia	192 or 112 (Note: The number 112 was put into service on 11 February 2022. The individual numbers for Police, Ambulance and Fire department will stay in use until February 2023.)	194 or 112	193 or 112	Police – 192; Ambulance – 194; Fire – 193.
Northern Cyprus	155	112	199	Forest Fire – 177; Coast Guard – 158; Civil Defense – 101.
Norway	112	113	110	Emergency at sea: 120; non-emergency police: 02 800; child abuse and family violence: 116 111; text phone: 1412; nearest health care outside office hours: 116 117; 911 redirects to 112.
Poland	997 or 112	999 or 112	998 or 112	Road help – 981, Elevator emergency – 982, Veterinary emergency – 983, Rescue on lakes and rivers – 984 or +48 601 100 100, Sea and mountain rescue – 985 or +48 601 100 300, Municipal police (where operating) – 986, Crisis Management Centre (focus depends on voivodeship) – 987, Electricity emergency – 991, Gas emergency – 992, Heat engineering emergency – 993, Water emergency – 994, Child alert (operated by Police) – 995, Counterterrorism emergency – 996, Missing children (EU hotline) – 116 000 Warsaw additionally maintains some local emergency numbers. 911 redirects to 112.
Portugal	112			Forest fire – 117; Social emergency – 144. 911 redirects to 112 on telephones located at Lajes Air Station.
Romania	112			911 redirects to 112
Russia	102 or 112	103 or 112	101 or 112	Gas emergency – 104; 112 came into effect (for any emergency) in 2013
San Marino	112 or 113	118	115	112, 113 and 115 reach the Interforce Operations Centre.
Serbia	192 or 112	194	193	Civil protection – 1985; 112 redirects to 192. It is possible to dial 112 and get direct connection with the emergency services by pressing 1 for police, 2 for ambulance and 3 for fire on Vip operator mobile phones.
Slovakia	112 or 158	112 or 155	112 or 150	Municipal police – 159.
Slovenia	113	112		Road help – 1987; Emergency at sea – 080 18 00.
Spain	112			Police: National Police – 091; Civil Guard – 062; Autonomic Police – 112; Municipal Police – 092. Fire: Local Firefighters – 080; Autonomic Firefighters – 085. Ambulance: SAMUR – 061. Others: Civil Protection – 1006, Maritime Rescue – 902 202 202; Red Cross – 901 222 222.
Sweden	112			Non-emergency police – 114 14; Non-emergency medical advice – 1177; Information during accidents and crises – 113 13.
Switzerland	117	144	118	Poison control – 145; Road help – 0800 140 140; Psychological support – 143; Psychological support for teens and children – 147; Rega air rescue – 1414 or by radio on 161.300 MHz; Air-Glaciers air-rescue (Valais only) – 1415. The emergency number 112 is used differently based on the Canton. While in some cantons 112, 117, 118 and 114 are routed to a common emergency call center, in other cantons 112 together with 117 is directly routed to the police.
Transnistria	102	103	101	
Turkey	112 or 911 or 153	112 or 911		Municipal police – 153 (112 connects to national police); Gas emergency and outages – 187; Electricity emergency and outages – 186; Water emergency and outages – 185; Non-emergency medical consultation - 184; Child abuse and family violence – 183; Telephone emergency and outages – 121; Poison control – 114. 911 automatically connects to 112. Current service is the result of consolidation of firefighter, emergency police, Gendarmerie, Coast Guard, forest fire, search and rescue, natural disaster and medical emergency numbers into medical emergency former solo number 112.
Ukraine	102	103	101	General emergencies – 112; Gas emergency – 104.
United Kingdom	999 or 112			Non-emergency police – 101; Power outages – 105; Non-emergency health issues – 111; COVID-19 testing helpline – 119; gas leaks – 0800 111 999. SMS messages can be sent to 999 after registration by sending a text message with the word 'Register' to 999. 911 redirects to 999 on mobile phones/public phonebooths and on telephones used in USAFE bases.
Vatican City	112			Emergency calls are handled by the Gendarmerie Corps. The Fire Brigade can also be reached at +39 06 698112.

== Oceania ==
Country	Police	Ambulance	Fire	Notes
American Samoa	911			
Australia	000			Mobile phones – 112 or 000; State Emergency Service – 132 500; National relay service – 106; Non-emergency police – 131 444 (NSW, QLD, VIC, SA, WA, NT, TAS & ACT); Crime Stoppers – 1800 333 000; Threats to national security – 1800 123 400; Poison control – 13 11 26; Lifeline – 13 11 14.
Cook Islands	999			
Fiji	911			Police – 917; Fire – 910; Crime Stoppers – 919.
French Polynesia	112			Police – 17; Ambulance – 15; Fire – 18.
Guam	911			
Kiribati	100 or 999			Police – 192; Ambulance – 194 and 195; Fire – 193.
Marshall Islands	911			
Micronesia	911			
Nauru	110	111	112	
New Caledonia	112			Police – 17; Ambulance – 15; Fire – 18.
New Zealand	111			SMS messages can be sent to 111 from registered mobile phones. Traffic – *555 (mobile phones only). 112 and 911 redirect to 111 on mobile phones. Dialing 000 and 999 plays a pre-recorded message advising the caller to call 111. Crime Stoppers – 0800 555 111. Police non-emergency – 105.
Niue	(+683) 4333	(+683) 4202	(+683) 4133	
Northern Mariana Islands	911			
Palau	911			
Papua New Guinea	112	111	110	
Samoa	999			Police – 995; Ambulance – 996; Fire – 994.
Solomon Islands	911 or 999			Police – 999; Ambulance – 111; Fire – 988. In cities, local numbers exist which connect more quickly than either 911 or 999.
Tokelau	(+690) 2116	(+690) 2112		
Tonga	911			Police – 922; Ambulance – 933; Fire – 999.
Tuvalu	911			Police – 911; Ambulance – 999; Fire – 000.
Vanuatu	111	112	113	
Wallis and Futuna	15			

== See also ==
- 000 – emergency number in Australia
- 100 – emergency number in India, Greece, Nepal and Israel
- 106 – emergency number in Australia for textphone/TTY
- 108 – emergency number in India (22 states)
- 110 – emergency number mainly in China, Japan, Taiwan
- 111 – emergency number in New Zealand
- 112 – emergency number across the European Union and on GSM mobile networks across the world
- 119 – emergency number in Jamaica and parts of Asia
- 122 – emergency number for specific services in several countries
- 911 – emergency number in North America and parts of the Pacific
- 999 – emergency number in many countries
