= 000 (emergency telephone number) =

Australian national emergency phone number

Triple Zero or 000 logo

Triple Zero (000) is the primary emergency telephone number for Australia and its External Territories. Calls to Triple Zero from the Australian mainland are initially answered by Telstra, then transferred to a state or territory emergency service. The Triple Zero system is overseen by the Australian Communications and Media Authority (ACMA) and is intended only for use in life-threatening or time-critical emergencies that requires police, fire or ambulance.

When called on a mobile or satellite phone, the international standard emergency telephone number 112 will be redirected to Triple Zero (000). Other numbers including 911 may be answered, though this is strongly discouraged by the government. For people with a speech or hearing impairment, 106 can be called from a telecommunications device for the deaf (TDD) textphones. 000 is the only emergency number that can be dialled from fixed lines including public payphones. No SIM card or calling credit is required to call emergency services, and national 'camp-on' arrangements mean that calls to Triple Zero will be passed through any available mobile network.

For non-life-threatening situations and natural disasters, the State Emergency Service (SES) number 132 500 should be called instead. For non-emergency calls to the police in Australia, 131 444 should be used.

000 was also the emergency telephone number in Denmark and Finland until the introduction of the 112 number in 1993, and in Norway until 1986, when the emergency telephone numbers diverted to 001 for fire brigade, 002 for police and 003 for ambulance. Those Norwegian emergency telephone numbers changed in 1994 to 110, 112 and 113 respectively.

== History ==
Before 1969, Australia did not have a national telephone number for emergency services; the police, fire and ambulance services had many telephone numbers, one for each local unit. In 1961, the Postmaster-General's Department started introducing the 000 telephone number in major population centres, and during the 1960s, extended its coverage nationwide.

The number 000 was chosen for several reasons. Technically, it suited the dialling system for the most remote automatic exchanges, particularly those in outback Queensland. These communities used the digit 0 to select an automatic trunk line to a centre. In the most remote communities, two 0s had to be used to reach a main centre, so dialling 0+0 plus another 0 would call (at least) an operator. Zero is also the closest to the finger stall on rotary dial phones making it easy to dial in the dark or an environment with smoke.

Today, the Triple Zero service is operated and maintained by Telstra, formerly known as Telecom Australia, which replaced the Postmaster-General's Department and was Australia's national telecommunications company prior to privatisation in the 1990s.

== Calling 000 ==
000 is a free call. If the phone cannot connect to the caller's subscribed network, the phone will attempt to roam and camp-on another carrier's network to carry the call. By law, mobile networks are required to take emergency calls from customers of competing networks through the national camp-on mechanism. For mobile and satellite phones, a SIM card is not required to connect a Triple Zero call via any network. Interpreter services for different languages are available, and non-English speakers are automatically connected to the police in their state or territory.

The 2G and 3G mobile networks have been discontinued in Australia and telecommunications providers in Australia are legally prohibited from providing services to phones that cannot access the Triple Zero system. Therefore, to make a call to the Triple Zero network or use any other telecommunications service, the device must be capable of at least 4G or VoLTE for calling.

=== Answering ===
Calling 000 begins by connecting to one of several public safety answering points operated by Telstra, called a Emergency Service Access Points, starting with a recorded message stating "You have dialled emergency Triple Zero, your call is being connected". The Telstra operator will ask the caller whether they require police, fire, or ambulance service, and their state or territory. When calling from a landline or public telephone, the location is automatically determined. The call is then transferred to the emergency service operator requested by the caller.

As soon as the emergency service call taker answers the call, any available caller location information, ascertained by automatically accessing a special database from the calling line identification (CLI) data that is provided with all emergency calls, is transferred to the emergency service. However, the emergency service call taker will still question the caller again to verify the caller's location in order to dispatch the correct response.

The caller's address is usually available to Telstra operators for fixed services in Australia even if the number is "private". However, emergency service organisation call takers will always ask for the address of the emergency to be stated whenever possible to ensure an accurate location is provided – this is especially relevant in the case of "third-party" callers who are not personally on the scene of the incident (e.g. relatives, or alarm monitoring corporations).

iPhone, Apple Watch, and Android smartphones can automatically determine the caller's location through Advanced Mobile Location technology.

Cocos (Keeling) Islands and Norfolk Island have their own Triple Zero infrastructure and calls from these external territories are not handled through Telstra or the mainland Triple Zero infrastructure.

==== Victoria ====
In the state of Victoria, emergency service dispatch and call taking for emergency services are centrally handled by Triple Zero Victoria (TZV), previously known as the Emergency Service Telecommunications Authority. TZV provides emergency communications services on behalf of Victoria Police, Ambulance Victoria, the Country Fire Authority and Fire Rescue Victoria. They operate three State Emergency Communications Centres, located in Williams Landing, East Burwood, and Ballarat.

Calls passed to Triple Zero Victoria will be answered by the first available call taker trained for that emergency service, who will collect information from the caller and enter this into the Computer Aided Dispatch (CAD) system. Using this information, a dispatcher will identify and dispatch the appropriate emergency services or resources. Emergency crews are often notified by the relevant services' dispatchers while the call taker is still obtaining further information or giving advice, such as guiding the caller through cardiopulmonary resuscitation (CPR), obtaining details of a possible offender, or receiving further details about the exact location or situation - an initial response may be made to details as vague as a town or suburb, while the call taker continues to get more specific location information.

Triple Zero Victoria is also responsible for Victorian State Emergency Service call-taking and dispatch, although this service cannot be contacted by dialling 000 as SES calls are not considered to be life-threatening.

Many Triple Zero Victoria practices and protocols are standardised across all emergency services agencies, as all agencies use the same computer network. The result is complete and instantaneous information sharing between emergency services.

=== Emergency+ ===
The Emergency+ app helps Triple Zero callers to identify their exact location by using their mobile phone's GPS and location services. Launched in 2013, it was developed by Fire and Rescue New South Wales. Videos in the app include instructions on CPR, as well as emergency first aid. The app also contains What3Words functionality, allowing users to quickly and easily provide accurate location details to a 000 dispatcher.

== Issues ==
=== 2003 overload in Melbourne ===
On 3 December 2003, floods and storms in Melbourne, Victoria, caused "an extremely high number of calls to the 000 emergency call service", which prevented some calls from being answered immediately. This delay was compounded by a software upgrade on the emergency call handling system used by the Victorian emergency service organisations (ESOs), meaning that Telstra (the national 000 call operator) encountered severe delays in handing over emergency calls to the relevant ESO. This caused some users interviewed by authorities to believe that they may have accidentally dialled the wrong number. A subsequent investigation recommended that a temporary recorded announcement be implemented during extreme events to assure callers that their calls were being connected and a delay may occur. This is not to be confused with the standard "You have dialled Emergency Triple Zero, your call is being connected" recorded voice announcement (RVA), which was introduced in 2008.

=== 2009 Victorian bushfires ===
On 7 February 2009, catastrophic bushfires occurred in Victoria, otherwise known as Black Saturday bushfires. Over 18,000 calls to the Triple Zero Emergency Service on that day were left unanswered, and the majority of calls took much longer to be answered than usual. Owing to the unprecedented numbers of calls coming through, Telstra decided to isolate all Victorian emergency calls which were answered by the Melbourne emergency call centre, with all the remaining calls answered by the Sydney emergency call centre. Telstra also activated the generic extreme event recorded voice announcement "You have dialled Emergency Triple Zero. If you require police, fire or ambulance, please stay on the line. If you require your local State Emergency Service please hang up and dial 1223 – that's 1223 – as this service cannot be connected through Triple Zero", which temporarily replaced their front-end announcement. While Telstra records show 95 emergency call centre employees rostered during the 24 hours on 7 February 2009, call pick up delays were evident due to lengthy delays at the SECC level, being ESTA. Telstra agents were left tied up on phone calls with callers, waiting for emergency services to answer, thus calls in the 000 queue were unable to be answered. Callers in a queue waiting for a Telstra agent to answer the phone were played an RVA every 30 seconds in the following terms, "You have dialled the Emergency Triple Zero number. Due to an unprecedented high volume of calls being received by Triple Zero, we are experiencing short delays in answering. Please stay on the line and you will be answered by the next available operator". This reassures callers that an extreme emergency was occurring, and their call would be answered.

=== Remote locations ===
One major obstacle in earlier 2009 is that operators of Triple Zero could not use global positioning system (GPS) data within GSM or CDMA telephone systems to accurately locate distressed or injured persons using mobile phones visibly away from roads. Instead, emergency operators must ask the caller exactly where they are. The answer to this may need to correspond to an existing road name (which may be practically impossible for distressed person(s) some kilometres away from a road), until the emergency service organisation operator can dispatch an emergency service vehicle.

In 2013, an emergency service smartphone app was produced and developed by Fire and Rescue NSW and the Triple Zero Awareness Working Group. Australians in remote locations are encouraged to use this app to contact emergency services, as it uses phones GPS data to display the caller's location on the screen. This allows the caller to read their location aloud to the operator, so they can be found by emergency services when they are far from roads.

In 2017–2018, ACMA stated in their annual report that both Industry and Government had begun to make considerable investment to communications infrastructure. This includes a privacy report for implementing the Advanced Mobile Location (AML) standard for Triple Zero calls. The system will automatically provide location data (including GPS, Wi-Fi positioning system, and mobile phone tracking) from the caller's device, to the Triple Zero operator automatically. These new arrangements were due to be implemented and operating by May 2020.

=== Incidents with Emergency Service Access Point operators ===
A case of 000 operator failure was reported in The Daily Telegraph in 2011. Joanne Wicking had called for police assistance, but the 000 operator chose to believe her killer, who had assured the operator everything was fine, despite repeated calls by Joanne. In another incident six months later, when 000 staff were insistent about needing a street address for a remote country farm, the man needing help died.

=== Telecommunications provider incidents ===
In April 2014, telecommunications company TPG was fined A$400,000 for withholding access to emergency numbers where customers had failed to pay their bills. Federal Court Justice Mordecai Bromberg found that TPG failed to provide access on over 190 occasions between March and September 2011, and the company did not ensure that almost 6000 lines had emergency access.

During the November 2023 Optus outage, major telecommunications operator Optus failed to ensure that Triple Zero calls made by their customers were able to camp on to another mobile or landline network. As a result, more than 2,100 calls to the Triple Zero system failed during the 12 hour outage and at least 300 people did not receive a welfare check when the issue was identified. Following parliamentary and government enquiries, Optus was fined more than A$12 million for failing to convey or transfer emergency calls and new national standards about communication during outages with customers were made.

For 90 minutes on the morning of 1 March 2024, Telstra suffered technical issues at one of its Emergency Service Access Points, resulting in calls not being able to be transferred to several emergency service organisations across Australia. Of the 500 Triple Zero calls during that period, 148 calls were not able to be transferred. In some states and territories, Telstra operators had to email emergency services with call details, some of which weren't received until 2 hours after the outage ended. A Victorian man died from a cardiac arrest during this period, where his emergency call was not able to be transferred to a Triple Zero Victoria emergency call-taker and the dispatch of an ambulance was significantly delayed. Federal and state governments have initiated investigations, although they have acknowledged that there was little that could have been done by Telstra call-takers who are not trained to provide medical advice or can dispatch resources.

On 18 September 2025, Optus experienced another outage to its network, exclusively effecting Triple Zero calls from the Northern Territory, South Australia and Western Australia. At least 600 calls over 15 hours were not connected to Triple Zero by Optus, and at least three people who attempted to call Triple Zero were found to have died. Welfare checks by the company and state and territory police are ongoing, and multiple investigations have been announced by regulators and Optus.

A widespread Telstra network outage on 8 July 2026, caused by a time travel software bug, disrupted Triple Zero (000) emergency services and triggered over 600 failed emergency calls. The incident impacted nationwide network services, affecting public transport and financial systems before a resolution was deployed.

== See also ==
- 106 Text Emergency Call is the Australian national textphone/TTY emergency telephone number.
- Police 101 is the police single non-emergency telephone number in the United Kingdom (UK) which automatically connects the caller to their local police force (with the option to select a different police force if required), in a similar manner to the 999 emergency telephone number.
- 108 is the emergency telephone number in India.
- 110 is the emergency telephone number in China and Japan.
- 111 is the emergency telephone number in New Zealand.
- 112, or one-one-two is the emergency telephone number across the European Union (EU), United Kingdom (UK - where it works parallel to 999), and other non-EU countries, and on Global System for Mobile Communications (GSM) mobile telephone networks across the world. Alternate emergency telephone number for tourists in Macau.
- 119 is the emergency telephone number in Jamaica and parts of east and south Asia. From May 2020, 119 was introduced in the United Kingdom as the single non-emergency number for the COVID-19 testing helpline in England, Wales, and Northern Ireland.
- 911, or nine-one-one is the emergency telephone number in the United States, Canada, Mexico, and the Philippines.
- 999, or nine-nine-nine is the common emergency telephone number used to contact one of the four main emergency control centres (ECC) in the United Kingdom (where it works parallel to 112); also an emergency telephone number in several non-EU countries including Hong Kong. Former emergency telephone number in Ireland and Poland.
- Emergency telephone
- Emergency telephone number
- In Case of Emergency (ICE) is one (or more) entries in the contacts (phone book) on many mobile phones.
