= Department of Health (Karnataka) =

Department of Health in the Indian state of Karnataka

Agency overview
- Formed: 1982
- Jurisdiction: Government of Karnataka
- Headquarters: Bengaluru, Karnataka, India
- Minister responsible: U. T. Khader, Minister of Health
- Website: karunadu.karnataka.gov.in/health/Pages/Home.aspx

The Department of Health, commonly referred to as the Health Department, is a department of the Government of Karnataka with responsibility for public health, hospitals, health insurance schemes, disease control programs, and family welfare throughout the Indian state of Karnataka. Established in 1982, the department manages the state's healthcare infrastructure, including government hospitals, primary health centres, and coordinates the implementation of national health missions within Karnataka.

== History ==
The department has played a central role in managing Karnataka's public health system since its inception. During the COVID-19 pandemic, it took the lead in coordinating the state's response, beginning with early advisories on social distancing measures. The department developed comprehensive protocols for managing larger outbreaks and implemented emergency measures including training medical professionals on efficient oxygen utilization during critical shortages. The department has confronted persistent structural challenges, including managing operations with approximately 30% of positions remaining unfilled.

== Organization ==
The department operates under the leadership of a cabinet-level Minister of Health, currently Dinesh Gundu Rao, who works alongside a Principal Secretary from the Indian Administrative Service. The department oversees an extensive network that includes primary health centres, community health centres, district hospitals, and medical colleges distributed throughout the state.

=== Administrative Reforms ===
In 2022, the department expanded its administrative reach by assuming direct operational control over urban primary health centres located in Bengaluru. To address chronic shortages of specialist doctors, the department raised allowances in 2021 and introduced a systematic approach to filling vacant positions through phased recruitment.

Beginning in the mid-2020s, the department initiated comprehensive reforms targeting corruption reduction and operational efficiency in staff postings and transfers. These reforms started with implementing a mandatory centralized counselling system for all staff transfers to promote transparency. This was followed by the development and publication of a formal draft transfer policy designed to institutionalize these procedures. The reform process reached its peak with a large-scale transfer of over 6,676 officers and staff members in a single coordinated action, which the Health Minister later characterized as the first transparent transfer process in eight years. Additional measures included establishing limits on deputation periods and reorganizing senior administrative positions.

=== Human Resource Management ===
Managing a substantial workforce that includes ASHA workers and contract staff has presented ongoing challenges for the department. In 2024, it made the decision to relieve 195 contract nurses from their positions as ASHA mentors, though this action was subsequently stayed by the Karnataka High Court. When ASHA workers organized a strike in August 2024, the department took measures to maintain essential services by prohibiting leave for its staff. A 2018 internal study revealed concerning health statistics among department staff themselves, documenting high rates of diabetes and hypertension within the workforce.

=== Digital Initiatives and e-Governance ===
The department has pursued digital modernization through various technological initiatives. An early project introduced an Aadhaar-enabled biometric attendance system for staff, which was later replaced by a more advanced app-based attendance system. The department has also mandated that government hospitals upload information about their medical equipment to a centralized platform to improve inventory management and oversight.

== Regulatory functions ==
The department exercises regulatory authority across various health-related sectors, often coordinating with other government bodies in its decision-making process. A notable example occurred in 2017 when it reversed a proposed ban on chewing tobacco following advice from the Advocate General. The department has taken enforcement action against unqualified medical practitioners and pharmacies operating outside legal boundaries by selling prescription medications without proper authorization.

Regulatory oversight has expanded to include traditional medicine systems, with the department placing testing laboratories for Ayurvedic (Ayush) medicines under the jurisdiction of the Food and Safety Department. The department established a specialized inspection committee to monitor organ transplant activities and proposed amendments to the Karnataka Private Medical Establishments (KPME) Act to bring private ambulance services under regulatory control. In a significant food safety action, the department prohibited the use of plastic sheets for steaming idlis after experts raised concerns about cancer risks from toxic chemical exposure.

== Ambulance and emergency services ==
A major operational transition occurred in 2025 when the department assumed direct operational responsibility for the state's 108 Arogya Kavacha ambulance service, taking control from its previous private operator. This transition included bringing the ambulance service's command and control centre under direct departmental management.

== Public health response ==
The department coordinates its public health activities with other government departments, including collaborative work with the Urban Development Department (UDD) to implement disease control measures across urban areas. The department has a track record of organizing large-scale public health initiatives, including a comprehensive tuberculosis screening campaign that reached over 1.03 crore people in 2018.

The department regularly addresses various public health threats through advisory systems for seasonal diseases including dengue and heat-related illnesses, as well as infectious diseases such as COVID-19
