= 2025 Optus emergency calling outage =

Significant telecommunications outage

- Date: 18 September 2025
- Time: Approximately 12:30 am – 1:30 pm
- Duration: 13:00:00
- Location: Northern Territory, South Australia, Western Australia and New South Wales
- Cause: Firewall upgrade
- Outcome: Approximately 600 failed Triple Zero calls
- Deaths: Four deaths of people who attempted to call emergency services

On Thursday 18 September 2025, major Australian telecommunications provider Optus experienced a technical fault to its network resulting in some customers unable to make calls to Triple Zero (000), the national emergency services phone number, for around 13 hours. An issue with a routine firewall upgrade resulted in some callers from the Northern Territory, South Australia, Western Australia and New South Wales not being able to make emergency calls. Approximately 600 calls were identified to have failed during the outage, and at least four people who attempted to call Triple Zero during the outage have been confirmed to have died.

On 18 November 2025, TPG Telecom also had a similar outage due to outdated software. They also confirmed that at least one person had died. On 9 December 2025, it was confirmed that a second person had died as a result of an outage unrelated to this one in Wentworth Falls in the Blue Mountains.

On 26 November, Optus services (including emergency calls) were brought offline due to a cut fibre optic cable in Frankston and the Mornington Peninsula in Victoria from 9 am to 11:20 am. Optus advised customers to use Wi-Fi or another mobile network within range.

== Outage ==
Optus began a change described as "a regular upgrade" to its firewall systems at approximately 12:30 am on Thursday, 18 September 2025. These changes are believed to have caused calls to Triple Zero to have intermittently failed across the Northern Territory, South Australia and Western Australia; normal calls were unaffected. It was later revealed that two additional calls from the New South Wales town of Broken Hill near the South Australian border were affected, as they were routed through South Australian towers. The upgrade to the firewall resulted in the system blocking calls to emergency services. It is believed that only Triple Zero was affected due to these calls being handled by a separate emergency calling system inside Optus' network.

In a media release, Optus stated that initial testing identified that normal calls were connecting as expected and that national call volume monitoring "did not raise any red flags". The company said "there were no alarms to alert [them] that some emergency calls were not making it through", but that their monitoring system excluded Triple Zero calls.

At least two calls to the Optus contact centre around 9 am notifying the company of the issue were believed to have not been properly escalated or investigated. Optus later admitted that a further review of contact centre activity found at least three additional calls were made to notify Optus of the issue, none of which were properly investigated by the company.

Around 1:30 pm on the day, Optus was again contacted directly by a customer to alert them that calls to Triple Zero were not working. This was then followed by concerns being raised by South Australia Police at 1:50pm. Shortly after these later notifications, Optus stopped the upgrade and reverted the firewall changes to Triple Zero call handling. Only after resolving the issue did Optus notify emergency services and government regulators that they had experienced an outage.

In the late evening on 18 September 2025, Optus began completing welfare checks on callers who had been unable to contact Triple Zero during the outage. It was not until a press conference on Friday, 19 September that Optus alerted police and government regulators that they had identified multiple, potentially outage-related, deaths. On 20 September, SA Police announced that they had completed 154 welfare checks on Optus customers and no additional adverse outcomes had been reported as yet. WA Police additionally completed welfare checks on 147 of the 149 households who were unable to place emergency calls. Optus and NSW Police have completed welfare checks of the two callers from New South Wales.

=== Deaths ===
During Optus' welfare checks of failed calls, three people were found by the company to have died after the household was unable to contact emergency services. The deaths include an eight-week-old boy and a 68-year-old woman from South Australia, and a 74-year-old man in Western Australia. On 20 September, an additional death of a 49-year-old man from Kensington, Perth was identified during a welfare check by WA Police after being likely unable to contact Triple Zero.

SA Police have said that initial investigations suggest the death of the eight-week-old boy in Gawler West was unlikely to have been caused by the failure, and that the delay in contacting Triple Zero would not have prevented the death. The grandmother of the child attempted to call emergency services using her mobile phone on the Optus network, but used a second device in the household when her phone did not connect the first time. Police are continuing to investigate the impact of the outage on the death of the 68-year-old woman.

=== Communication with emergency services ===
The WA Government has said that they were only notified by Optus that they had identified potentially-related death late Friday afternoon, more than 24-hours after the incident and after preparing media statements. Acting Premier Rita Saffioti claimed that Optus failed to abide by protocols for Triple Zero outages, and it wasn't until just after 9 pm that Optus notified WA Police about the outage. At the time, Optus disclosed only 26 of the total 149 failed calls in WA during the outage. Optus had already begun its own welfare checks before notifying police, and CEO Rue said that police were only notified of individual cases where Optus was unable to contact the caller.

Optus CEO Stephen Rue has admitted that although some government agencies had been contacted prior, the SA premier's office was only notified of the incident at the same time as the press conference. South Australian Premier Malinauskas has said that Optus' communication about the outage had been deficient with government, noting that the company was first contacted by customers as early as 9 am. It was not until after the press conference on the Friday that Optus handed over a list of affected customers to SA Police. Police Commissioner Grant Stevens said that he had to personally call Rue to request the company release details of callers, and that the company only originally provided a list of suburbs that failed calls came from.

== Response after the outage ==
Optus has received significant criticism from governments, politicians and the media for their handling of the event.

Leader of the National Party, David Littleproud, criticised the company's response as well as the entire telecommunication industry for the quality of services. Television presenter Gus Worland said during an interview on Today that CEO Stephen Rue must "fall on his sword" for the incident, noting his predecessor's resignation over the 2023 Optus outage that also saw some Triple Zero calls fail.

In July 2026, the Australian Competition and Consumer Commission (ACCC) announced that they would launch legal action in the Federal Court against Optus, alleging that they breached legal two legal obligations more than 1,000 times.

=== Investigation by Optus ===
In a media release on 20 September, Optus CEO Stephen Rue apologised for not notifying Premiers and Chief Ministers until after Optus had made statements to media organisations in regard to the identified deaths. Rue said that Optus was unaware for an unacceptable gap in time that there was a technical failure.

Two complaints to the Telecommunications Industry Ombudsman, the industry's self-regulating organisation, were made by customers who had also contacted Optus in the morning about the Triple Zero failures. Rue has said that these calls were not appropriately handled, and that they were not escalated at the time by contact centre staff.

Optus has initiated its own investigation of the incident, including appointing an independent person to lead the review. Included in this review, Optus has said it will be reviewing all calls to its contact centre during the outage window. The company has also said that it will participate fully and transparently with government agencies and regulator investigations.

=== Government response and investigation ===
South Australian premier Peter Malinauskas slammed Optus for their handling of both the incident, and the proceeding communication with governments including that governments were blind-sided by Optus' media conference. Malinauskas has told press that the government was "very cautious of accepting everything that Optus says." The premier made significant comments that Optus had failed to fulfil its obligations to actively notify government authorities of issues with the Triple Zero system for many hours after the initial 9am call to their contact centre.

WA premier Roger Cook said that the government would "stop at nothing" to hold Optus to account for the outage, stating that the incident was "completely unacceptable" and a "dreadful tragedy". Both deaths in WA identified by Optus and by WA Police have been referred to the State Coroner for investigation.

Federal communications minister Anika Wells described the failure as "incredibly serious and completely unacceptable", saying that Optus like all providers had a regulatory obligation to ensure Triple Zero calls are carried. Wells announced an investigation into the matter, and that possible consequences would be considered after state and territory authorities and communication regulators had completed their reviews. Federal member for Perth, Patrick Gorman, described the outage as "completely unacceptable from an essential service operator", and that the federal investigation would ensure full accountability from Optus. National emergency services minister Kristy McBain has also blasted the company while speaking to ABC News, calling the outage "absolutely disgraceful" and that Optus needs to be "getting their systems in order" so Australians can have faith in being able to access emergency services through the Triple Zero system.

Opposition communications spokesperson Melissa McIntosh raised particular concern with the Triple Zero camp-on system, which she states should have automatically diverted emergency calls on Optus' failing network to the Telstra or Vodafone networks.

The New South Wales government's health minister and minister for the Illawarra Ryan Park criticised Optus harshly for its outage in Dapto revealed on 29 September, saying that "one [failed] caller is one too many when it comes to triple-0, to be perfectly frank". Park was also consulting with the Australian Communications and Media Authority (ACMA) about an earlier instance in Broken Hill.

On 3 November, Optus executives faced a Senate inquiry into the 18 September outage. It was revealed that 11 meetings of the board were held that day. Rue also blamed lower-level staff for failing to elevate the complaints.

On 5 November, Optus experienced a widespread issue in the Hunter Valley of New South Wales. It included regions such as Port Stephens and Maitland. The issue lasted from 5:10 pm to 5:55 pm.

== See also ==
- Optus
- Singtel, Optus' parent company
- 000 (emergency telephone number)
