= Radio Health =

Radio-based health awareness program

Radio Health is a radio-based health awareness program implemented by the National Health Mission, Kerala since 2008. This is a 15 to 30-minute program aired in All India Radio focusing on disseminating health-related information. The health awareness information presented in this program is mainly related to communicable and non-communicable diseases, adolescent health, lifestyle diseases, trauma care, mental health, geriatrics, maternal health and child care. The Radio Health Program is broadcast through eight radio stations. It is broadcast in Akashavani AM at 10 am from Monday to Friday and on Ananthapuri FM at 3:45 pm on all days.

Under this project, a community radio program for schoolchildren between 5-10 standards was also initiated. The pilot project was carried out in 2013 with a funding of 4.5 lakh rupees, where schoolchildren create health-related content for Radio Health.
