= 108 (emergency telephone number) =

Emergency free telephone number in India

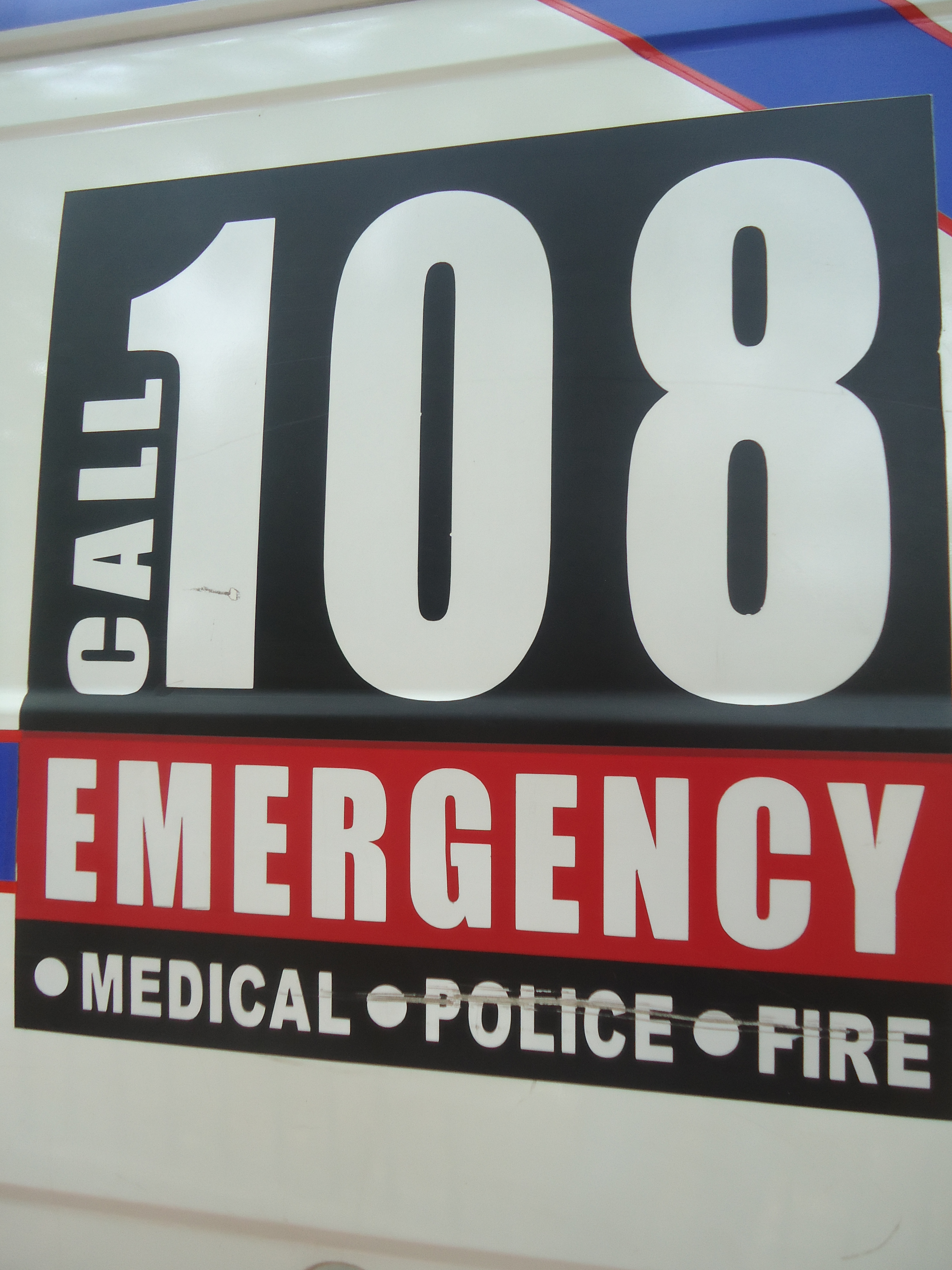
108 is a free-to-call emergency telephone number in India

One-zero-eight is a free-to-call telephone number for emergency services in India. It is implemented by the respective state and union territory governments, mostly under Public–private partnership with funding from the National Health Mission of Ministry of Health and Family Welfare, Government of India.

It was first introduced in Andhra Pradesh in 2005 as a part of Emergency Medicine, and Research Institute (EMRI). It is currently operational in 35 states and union territories. The services initially provided ambulances to the required and was later re-modeled to integrate health, police, firefighting and other disaster management services through a single platform. The services are provided free of cost to the beneficiaries.

== Background and history ==
In the early 2000s, it was estimated that inadequate and/ or lack of timely medical response resulted in the deaths of at least four million Indians every year. About ten percent of the people who face emergencies do not know who needs to be called. In 2004, Emergency Medicine, and Research Institute (EMRI) was established in Andhra Pradesh as a not-for-profit organization aimed at providing emergency medical services based on the idea conceived by A. P. Ranga Rao. Initially, it was funded by Ramalinga Raju of Satyam Computer Services with the Government of Andhra Pradesh being a non-funding partner and was later taken over by GVK Industries. The services were launched in August 2005 with a fleet of 30 ambulances. In August 2007, the government signed an agreement to expand the project and provided 95% of the funding. In 2005, National Rural Health Mission was launched by the Ministry of Health and Family Welfare of Government of India, which aimed to provide ambulance services to rural areas. The emergency response services were later expanded and were implemented by the respective state and union territory governments, mostly under Public–private partnership with funding from the National Health Mission of Government of India.

== Scope ==
It is currently operational in 35 states and union territories. The services initially provided ambulances to the required and was later re-modeled to integrate health, police, firefighting and other disaster management services through a single platform. The services are provided free of cost to the beneficiaries. Once the call is received from a user requesting for services, it is directed to provide appropriate services as per the analysis of the circumstances and the details. In case of medical emergency, it is passed on to the relevant ambulance operator and hospitals while other requests are forwarded to the respective departments.

== Financials ==
The services are operated with private assistance wherein as of 2024, three private companies handle services in all the existent territories. Government of India provides funding for the set-up on infrastructure including call centers, ambulances, software and other hardware. The operational cost is borne by the state governments with subsidies from the central government. It is subsidized up to 60% in the first year of operations and reduces progressively. The infrastructure costs less than US$0.5 per person served compared to US$50 for the similar 911 service in the United States and the per person service costs range up to US$15 in India compared to US$800 in the U.S.

== Infrastructure and operations ==
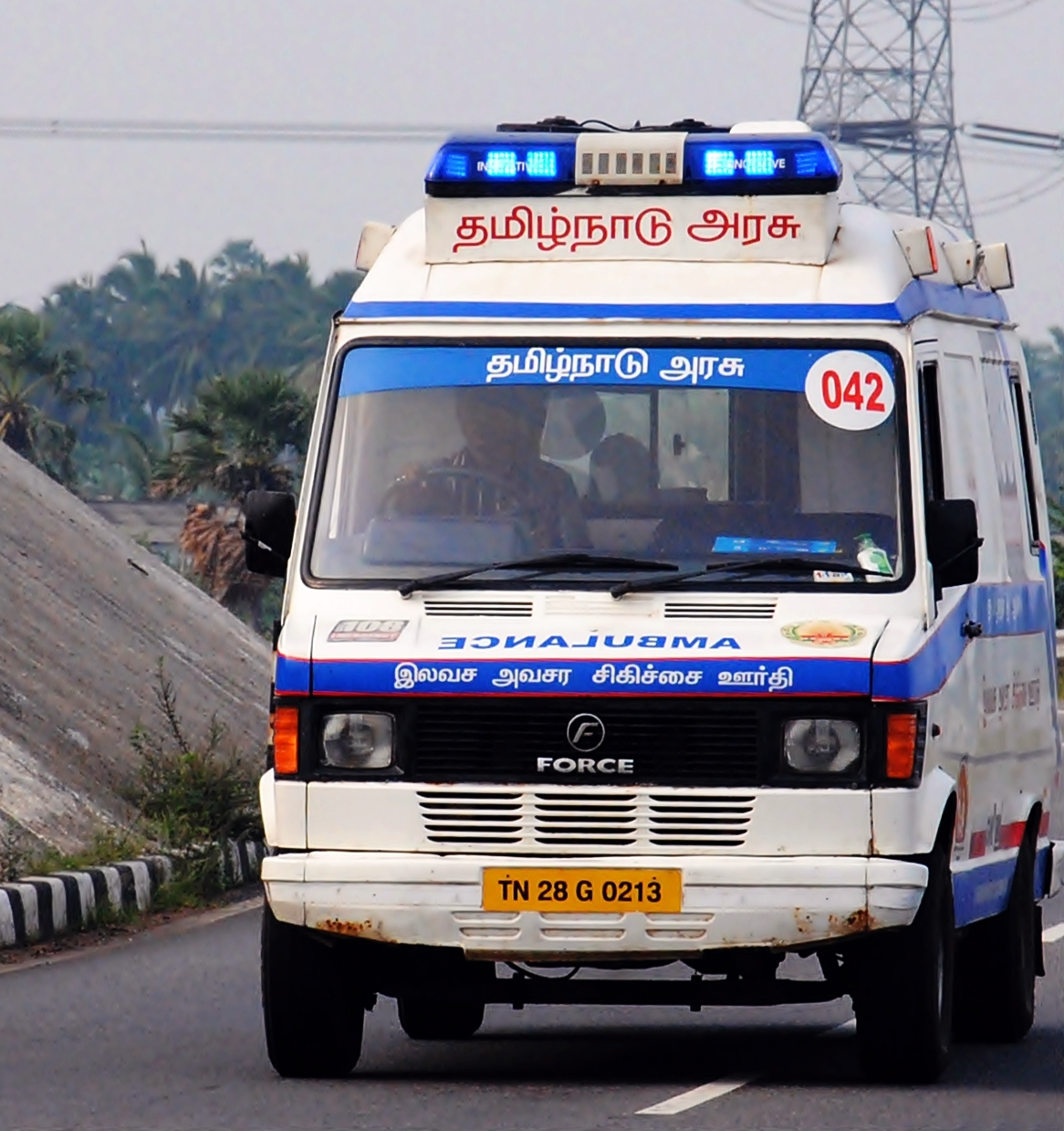
A emergency response ambulance operated by the service

The Government provides funding and oversees the operations, but the entire operations and maintenance of infrastructure is contracted to the private entities. As of 2024, there are only three private operators providing emergency services: GVK Emergency Management and Research Institute (GVK EMRI), Ziqitza Healthcare Limited (ZHL), and Bharat Vikas Group India-UK Specialist Ambulance Services (BVG-UKSAS).

The dedicated Emergency Response Centers received calls dialed on the number and the telephone operators collect the basic information on the emergency. The information is passed onto Emergency Relief Operators, who follow an established process to determine the type of emergency. Once this is ascertained, for non-medical emergencies, it is passed onto the respective departments to address the same. In case of a medical emergency, the operator ascertains the location and the details of the issue. Based on the same, the nearest ambulance and health care center are identified with the details passed onto the stakeholders. While the ambulance is en-route, the operator connects back to the caller for providing assurance and confirmation, while providing relevant details to the Emergency medical technician (EMT). When the ambulance reaches the location, the EMT provides required support and the patient is carried to the nearest health center prescribed. On reaching the health center, the patient is handed over with the appropriate information provided.

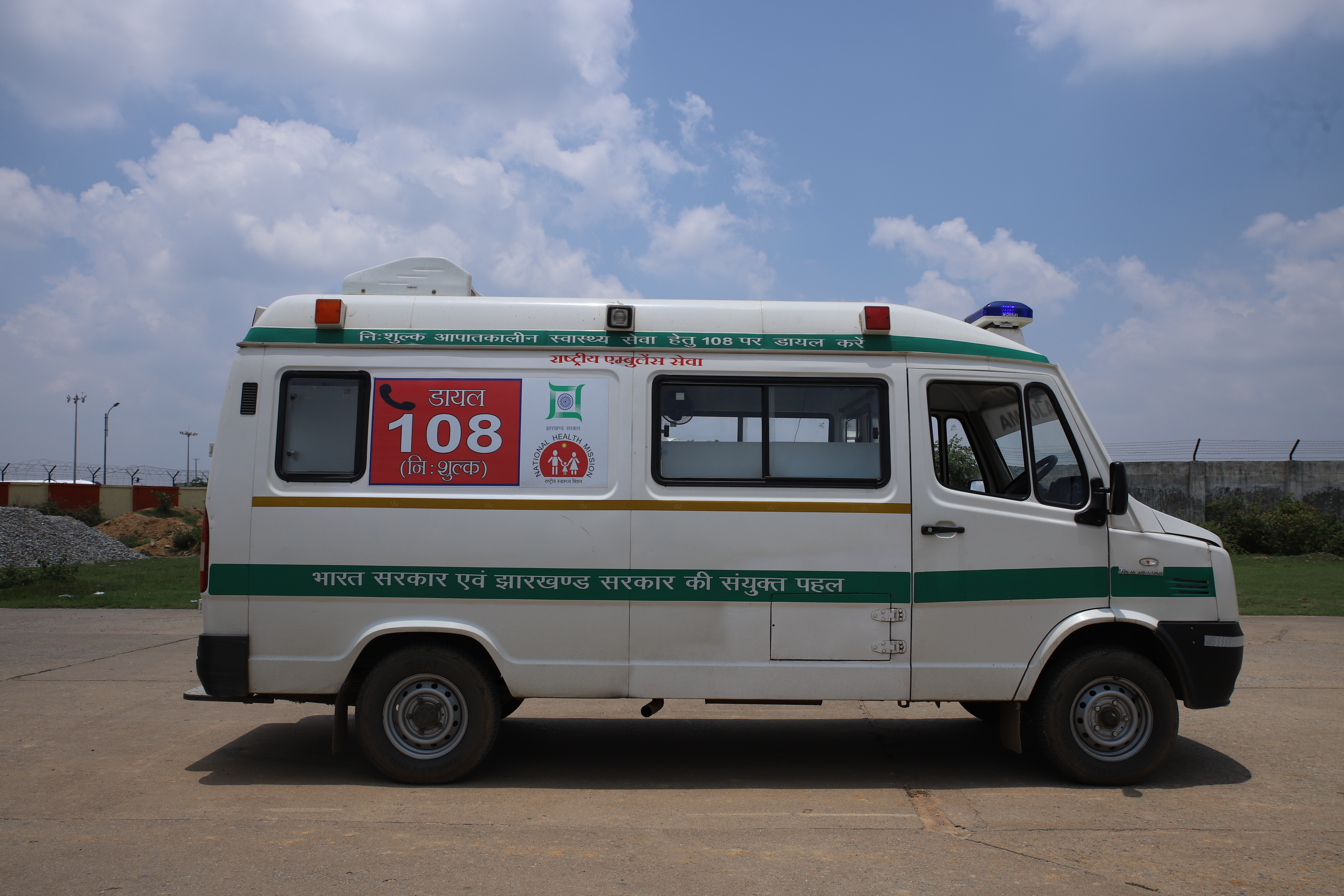
The ambulances prominently display the dial-to-number 108

As of 2024, there are 10,993 ambulances in service. The ambulances are classified into two types: Basic Life Support (BLS) and Advanced Life Support (ALS).

The guidelines for equipping the ambulances are laid down by the Ministry of Road Transport and Highways in 2013. The ambulances are accompanied by trained drivers and appropriate medical personnel, who are trained as a part of the project by the operator. Apart from standard road ambulances, boat ambulance are also used in appropriate locations. In addition, there are states which operate 102 (ambulance service), which provided only ambulance services and specific maternity ambulances in conjunction with the service.

As per the data available with EMRI, which operates the services in fourteen states, as of 2010, the service employed more than 11,000 people and handled up to 80,000 calls a day and catered to more than 7,000 emergencies with a fleet of 2,600 ambulances. The operators determine and execute the emergency response decisions in 80 to 90 seconds on average. In 2019, it employed over 47,000 people attending to 22,000 emergencies per day. The average response time was 14 minutes in cities and 31 minutes in rural areas.

The challenges in the emergency response system in India include:

  - communication barriers due to the existence of large number of languages and dialects,
  - optimizing the route taken to reach the person in distress and back to the health care center due to poor data on the available routes in rural areas and
  - the condition of roads.

The data collected from the emergency services are used to optimize the operations progressively in order to improve response times, reduce time delays, optimize and customize first line treatment according to existing conditions. Though hailed as an emergency service, there have been issues such as poor oversight by the provincial governments, concerns on training and staff welfare in the system.

== Other emergency numbers ==
Following is the list of other emergency helpline numbers in India.

- Police: 100
- Fire: 101
- Ambulance: 102
- Women Helpline: 1091
- Women Helpline for Domestic Abuse: 181
- Missing Child And Women: 1094
- Children In Difficult Situation: 1098
- Senior Citizen Helpline: 1091 or 1291
- Road Accident Emergency Service: 1073
- Road Accident Emergency Service on National Highways: 1033
- Railway Accident Emergency Service: 1072
- Disaster Management: 1078
- Relief Commissioner For Natural Calamities: 1070
- Tourist Helpline: 1363
- LPG Leak Helpline: 1906
- AIDS Helpline: 1097
- Central Vigilance Commission: 1964

== See also ==
- 102 (ambulance service)
