= 119 (emergency telephone number) =

Emergency telephone number

119 (one-one-nine) is an emergency telephone number in parts of Asia and in Jamaica. From May 2020, 119 was introduced in the United Kingdom as the single non-emergency number for the COVID-19 testing helpline in England, Wales, and Northern Ireland. From January 2022, 119 was introduced in Romania as the single non-emergency number for reporting cases of abuse, neglect, exploitation and any other form of violence against children.

== Afghanistan ==
The 119 Information Center of the Minister of Interior Affairs was founded in 2009 in Kabul city with 58 employees operating 24 hours a day. This main goal of this information center is to give citizens an opportunity to report complaints of police misbehavior, corruption, and human rights violations, criminal and terrorist activity. In 2013, with the help of the public, the 119 information prevented many dangerous attacks against people and property. In 2020, the national police disabled 173 mines, discovered 15 suicide vests, and arrested 20 suicide attackers.

== China ==
119 is recognised in China as the standard emergency telephone number for firefighters. Similar to Japan, the emergency telephone number for police is 110, but ambulance service is available with the emergency telephone number 120 in China.

== Japan ==
119 in Japan is a direct-dial emergency number that connects the caller to the fire brigade and emergency medical services. Although the dispatchers still record the address of the emergency call manually, most systems are now set up to automatically log the location of the call. Unlike many emergency telephone number services, the 119 system in Japan only services fire and ambulance services. Police are called using a separate emergency telephone number, 110.

== Maldives ==
The 1-1-9 in Maldives is a direct-dial free emergency telephone number that connects the caller to the national police; the Maldives Police Service.

== South Korea ==
119 is a direct-dial emergency telephone number in South Korea for fire brigade and ambulance service operated by the National Emergency Management Agency. The caller's location is automatically traced once the call is connected, and operators who can speak Chinese, English, Japanese, and Korean should be available.

1339 is a separate telephone number reserved for non-emergency medical information calls. An emergency pager service called 'U119' also exists for registered people such as the elderly or cancer patients. 112 is the emergency number for police, with other numbers dedicated for other situations, such as discovery of missing persons.

== Sri Lanka ==
The 1-1-9 Police Emergency Service is an emergency response system in Sri Lanka that was established during the Sri Lankan Civil War. It was established for the aid in battling terrorism by the means of helping civilians in the conflict, and also as a supportive tool in locating and preventing attacks by terrorists. But now, 119 has become the standard emergency telephone number for calling the police. When a caller dials 119, the request goes to the Police Emergency Division in Colombo, and will be diverted to the police station nearest to the caller's location, depending on the situation. Though mainly used to contact police, 119 calls can be placed to summon the Fire Brigade as well, whereas the call will be again diverted. The number is accessible from any part of the island on all telephone and cellular networks.

== Taiwan ==
119 is recognised in Taiwan as the emergency telephone number for firefighters and ambulance services. As in Japan, the emergency telephone number for police is 110.

== United Kingdom ==
Introduced on 18 May 2020, the non-emergency urgent telephone number 119 is allocated to the COVID-19 vaccine helpline in England. It allows people to arrange Coronavirus vaccination appointments. In Scotland, 0300 303 2713 is the non-geographical telephone number to be used, instead of 119.

== See also ==
- 000 Emergency is the emergency telephone number in Australia.
  - 106 Text Emergency Call is the Australian national textphone/TTY emergency telephone number.
- Police 101 is the police single non-emergency telephone number in the United Kingdom which automatically connects the caller to their local police force (with the option to select a different police force if required), in a similar manner to the 999 emergency telephone number.
- 105 is the single non-emergency telephone number in the United Kingdom, it connects to the caller's local electricity distribution network operator, and is primarily established for reporting power cuts. In New Zealand, it is used to contact the police in general non-emergency situations.
- 111 is the emergency telephone number in New Zealand.
- NHS 111 is a free-to-call single non-emergency telephone number medical helpline provided by the National Health Service (NHS) in the United Kingdom operating in England, Scotland, and parts of Wales.
- 112, or one-one-two, is the emergency telephone number across the European Union, United Kingdom (where it works parallel to 999), and other non-EU countries, and on Global System for Mobile Communications (GSM) mobile telephone networks across the world. Alternate emergency telephone number for tourists in Macau.
- 911, or nine-one-one, is the emergency telephone number in United States of America, Canada, and Mexico.
- 999, or nine-nine-nine, is the common emergency telephone number used to contact one of the four main emergency control centres (ECC) in United Kingdom (where it works parallel to 112); also an emergency telephone number in several non-EU countries. Former emergency telephone number in Ireland and Poland.
- Emergency telephone number
- In Case of Emergency (ICE) is one (or more) entry in the contacts (phone book) on many mobile phones.
