= 102 (ambulance service) =

Emergency medical service in India

The Free Ambulance Service is an emergency medical transport service in India that is usually reserved for newborns and pregnant women. It is also called National Ambulance Service (NAS). Under this service, all the ambulances are fitted with GPS system (for easy tracking) and other necessary medical equipment. This emergency transport service facilitates 24x7 free of cost service to pregnant women, newborn babies and their mothers as well under the Janani SurakshaYojana and Janani Shishu Suraksha Karyakram. The ambulance service provides first aid to the patient and transport them to the nearest Community Health Centre or Government hospitals. There are 10017 ambulances operating as 102 patient transport. In some states, 5484 empanelled vehicles are also used as 102 ambulances to transport pregnant women and children to nearest healthcare facility.

== History ==
102 National Ambulance Service was started on 17 January 2014 in Uttar Pradesh. A fleet of around 2270 Ambulances is operational in all the districts of the State, to date. On an average, around 65,000 calls are received and 25,000 trips serviced on any working day in Uttar Pradesh. Around ten million women and newborns have benefited from this service, until 2016. This service is provided through a private service provider Ganapati Venkata Krishnanreddy Emergency Management and Research Institute GVK-EMRI which provides free ambulance services under government-run helplines in 17 states and union territories in India.

After the success of 102 Emergency Medical Ambulance Services (OEMAS) in Uttar Pradesh, many states also launched the 102 ambulance service for free referral transport of pregnant women and sick infants under Janani Sishu Surakhya Karyakram (JSSK) programme. Some of the states to launch 102 service include Odisha, Madhya Pradesh, Sikkim, Jharkhand, Himachal Pradesh, West Bengal and Uttarakhand. In Odisha alone, the maternal mortality rate has gone 81 points down from 303 in 2006 to 222 in 2013 after the introduction of 102 ambulance service by the state government in private public partnership with Ziqitza Healthcare under the JSSK programme.

== Operation ==
It consists of an Emergency Response Centre (ERC) which is a centralized call centre that receives and handles the emergency phone calls. The call centre is staffed with Emergency Response Officers (ERO) by GVK-JSS in Aashiana, Lucknow. They take the emergency call, determine the location and send an ambulance to the place. That ambulance reaches the patient in 20 minutes in cities and around 30 minutes in rural places.

Similarly, other states of India have their own centralized call centres to receive 102 emergency ambulance service calls and send the ambulances to the emergency spot. Some states use empanelled vehicles as 102 ambulance service namely Janani express in MP & Odisha, Mamta Vahan in Jharkhand, Nishchay Yan Prakalpa in West Bengal, and Khushiyo ki Sawari in Uttarakhand. All the state ambulances supported under National Health Mission (NHM) abide by the mandatory NAS guidelines.

== Beneficiaries ==
According to the GVK-EMRI's Chief Operating Officer in Uttar Pradesh, Sanjay Khosla, around 1 crore and 57 lakh people have already been benefited from the 102 and 108 services in Uttar Pradesh since 2013. Of these around ninety lakh women have already benefited from the 102 services alone

JSSK programmed has helped the National Health Mission (NHM) to substantially reduce the infant and maternal mortality rate across India. Ziqitza Healthcare alone claims to have served 17,54,019 pregnant women and delivered over 10,000 babies. served 6 pickup and 6 to 7 drop per day
