= 100 (emergency telephone number) =

Emergency telephone number

1-0-0, also written 100, is an emergency telephone number in several countries. It is used to contact the police in Afghanistan, Nepal, Israel, Turkey, and Palestine. In Iraq, 1-0-0 is the number for emergencies, while in Mongolia it is used for infectious disease. The number is used for hazards in Chile, for domestic violence and child welfare in Peru, and for human rights in Brazil. In Haiti, 1-0-0 is the number for assistance with HIV, while in Belgium it is used for ambulance or fire.

While 1-0-0 works as an emergency number in Greece and India, both countries have begun transitioning to 1-1-2. Following the integration of emergency phone numbers in India, 1-1-2 replaces helplines for police (1-0-0), fire (1-0-1), and women (1-0-9-0).

== See also ==
- List of emergency telephone numbers
