= Municipal police (Turkey) =

Municipal-level Turkish law enforcement body

- Belediye zabıtası

Agency overview
- Formed: 4 September 1826
- Parent agency: Municipalities

Municipal police (Turkish: Belediye zabıtası) is a law enforcement body responsible for ensuring the implementation and control of public services in different municipalities in Turkey. The police officers also use their powers as traffic police in metropolitan municipalities.

== History ==
The origin of the law enforcement organization in Turkey is based on the ihtisab system that has an important place in the Turkish tradition and Islamic culture, based on which the first office for public regularity was created.

During the time of the Ottoman Empire, services related to the cities were carried out by different institutions and individuals such as the Grand Vizier, Agha of the Janissaries, secretariats, kadis, soubashis, Kapudan Pasha, the Djebedji, and seraskers. Among these institutions, the closest duties to today's municipal police were carried out by the kadis or judges. A clergyman responsible for enforcement and executions was assigned to each judge. The judges, together with their officers (ihtisap ağaları), carried out inspections and checked for the security, cleanliness, the prices and quality of the goods in the bazaar and the market. Officers also collected taxes from tradesmen, along with their assistants (kuloğlanlar).

As a result of the abolition of the Janissaries in 1826, the initial ihtisab system was removed and replaced by the Office for Public Regularity, established by Sultan Mahmud II. The duties of the assistants (kuloğlanlar) were also transferred to the new office's custodians. 4 September 1826 is generally accepted as the establishment date of the municipal police.

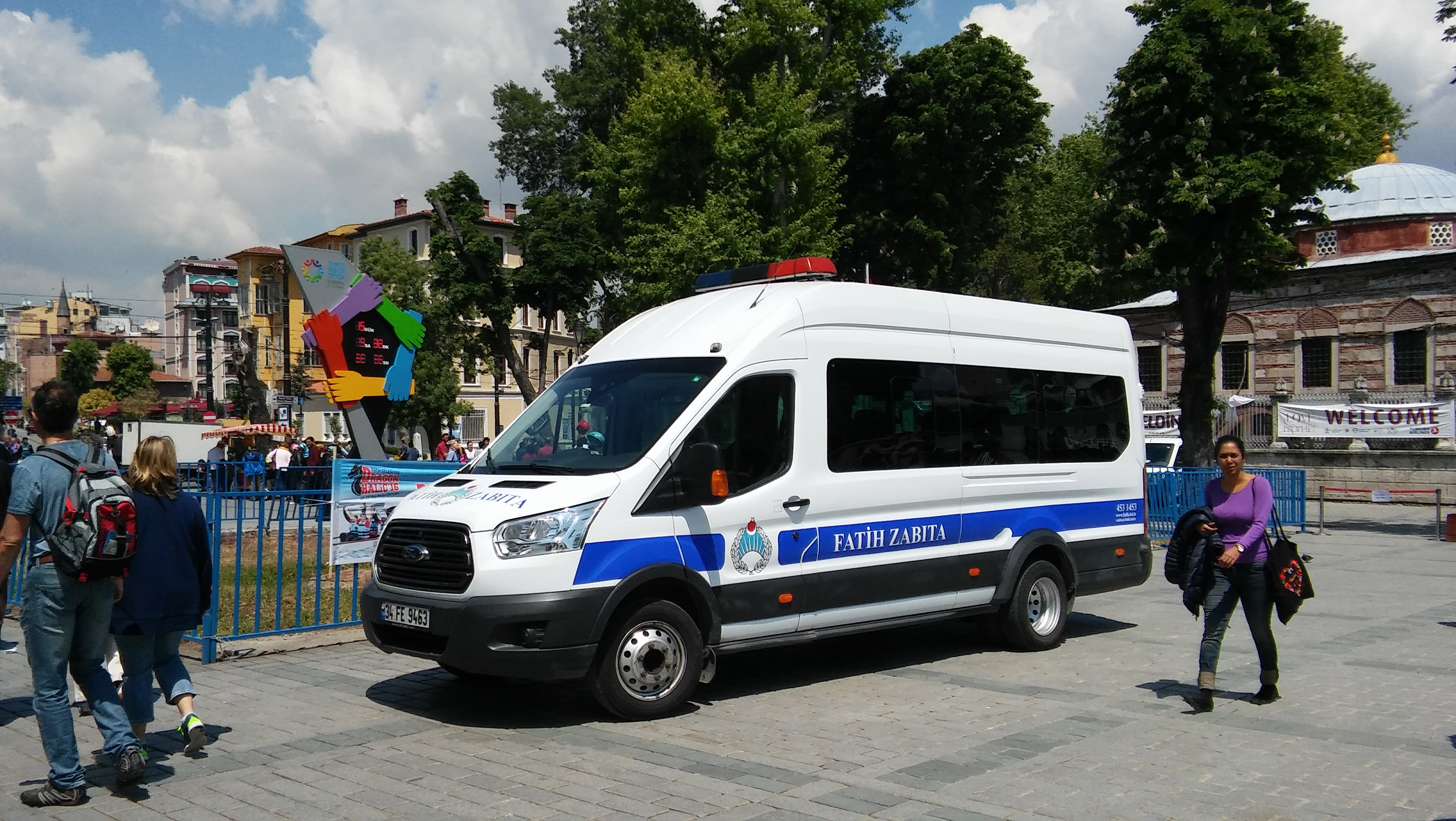
A police vehicle belonging to Fatih Municipality

As a result of the population growth and the growth of the cities in the 19th century, Specialization Ministry started to be inadequate in performing its duties. In order to eliminate this inadequacy, the Police Department was established in 1845, followed by the Gendarmerie in 1846.

In 1855, the Office for Public Regularity was abolished and the Istanbul Municipality was founded instead. The Tipstaff was commissioned for municipal police affairs. With a regulation issued in 1869, municipal police affairs were handed over to the police again.

With the reorganization of municipal services following the Municipal Law enacted in 1930, the police was defined as a special law-enforcing body that conducts and supervises municipal services. With this law, the structure of today's municipal police was defined. However, until 1956, these services were carried out by the general police forces, but eventually municipal police forces were established for different municipalities, starting with Istanbul.

== Ranks ==
The system of the municipal police consists of a total of five ranks.

Head of Department	Manager	Chief		Officer
Head of the Municipal Police Department	Municipal Police Manager; Municipal Police Branch Manager	Chief of Municipal Police	Municipal Police Commissioner	Municipal Police Officer
