= Accredited Social Health Activist =

Indian profession

Accredited Social Health Activist (ASHA)
- Country: India
- Ministry: Ministry of Health and Family Welfare
- Launched: 2005
- Status: 939,978 ASHA's (2018)

An Accredited Social Health Activist (ASHA) is a community health worker employed by the Ministry of Health and Family Welfare (MoHFW) as a part of India's National Rural Health Mission (NRHM). The mission began in 2005; full implementation was targeted for 2012. The idea behind the Accredited Social Health Activist (ASHA) was to connect marginalized communities to the public health care system. The target was to have an "ASHA in every village" in India. In July 2013, the number of ASHAs in India was reported to be 870,089. In 2018, this number rose to 939,978. The ideal number of ASHAs envisaged was 1,022,265.

== Roles and responsibilities ==
ASHAs are women trained to act as health educators and health promoters in their communities. The Indian MoHFW describes them as:

...health activist(s) in the community who create awareness on health and its social determinants and mobilize the community towards local health planning and increased utilization and accountability of the existing health services.

Their tasks include:

- Motivating women to give birth in hospitals,
- Bringing children to immunisation clinics,
- Encouraging family planning (e.g., surgical sterilisation),
- Treating basic illness and injury with first aid,
- Keeping demographic records, and
- Improving village sanitation.

ASHAs also serve as a key communication mechanism between the healthcare system and rural populations.

An ASHA acts as a depot holder for essential provisions being made available to all habitations like:

- Oral Rehydration Salts (ORS) Therapy,
- Iron Folic Acid (IFA) Tablets,
- Chloroquine,
- Disposable Delivery Kits (DDK),
- Oral Pills &
- Condoms.

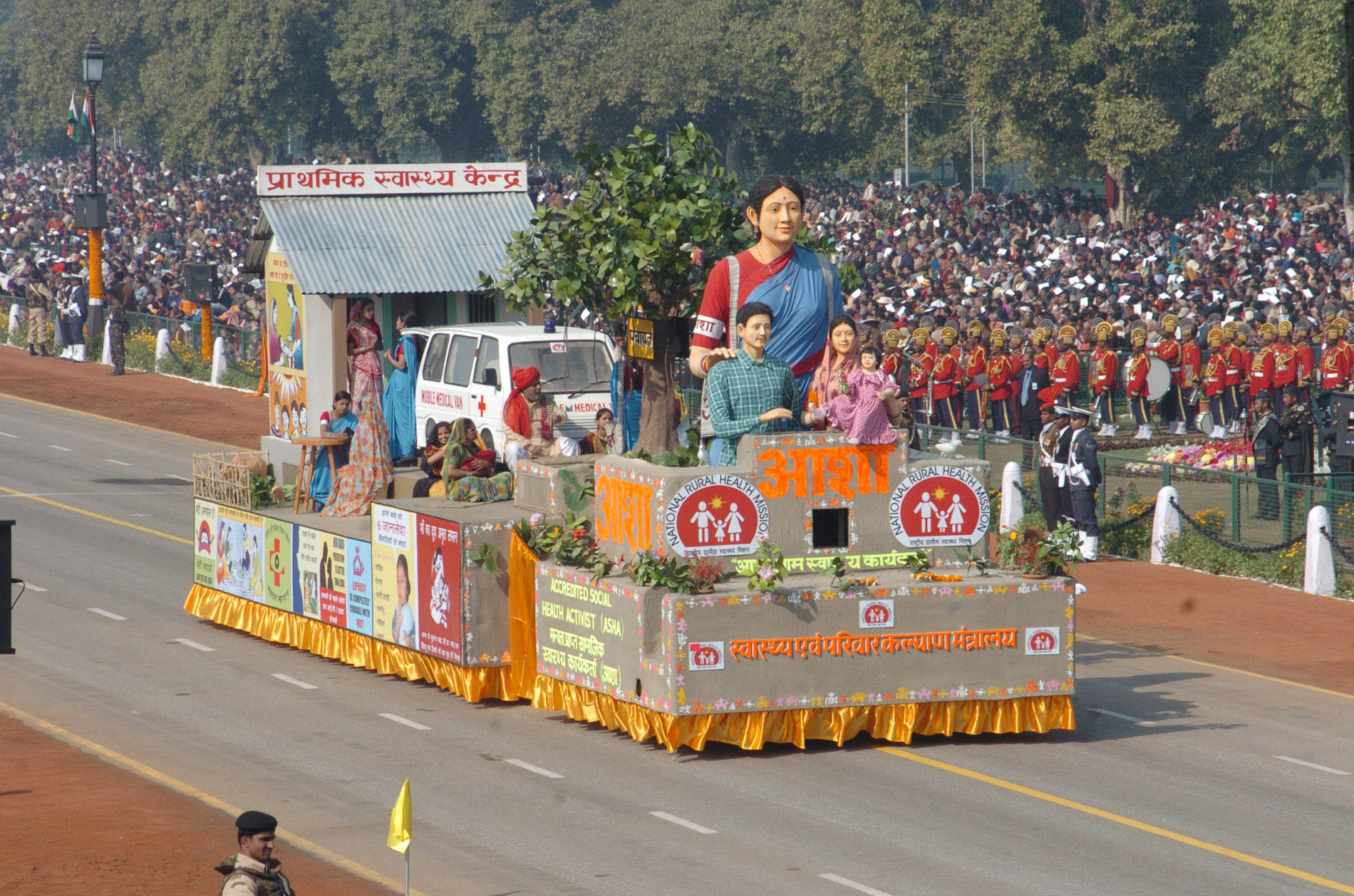
The tableau of Ministry of Health and Family Welfare highlighting - 'Aasha' during the Republic Day Parade, 2006

Their responsibilities can be classified into:

- Counseling:

- Breast Feeding
- Skilled birth attendance
- Prevention of diseases

- Community sensitization:

- Malaria
- Tuberculosis
- Diarrhoea

- Escort:

- Ante- and Post-natal care
- Institutional delivery
- Immunisation
- Diabetes test
- Family planning

- Diagnosis

- Malaria
- Pregnancy

- Survey of health and related events
- Others

- Community mobilisation
- Health planning
- Participation in community health and allied activities

== Selection ==
- ASHAs must primarily be female residents of the village that they have been selected to serve, who are likely to remain in that village for the foreseeable future.
- Married, widowed or divorced women are preferred over women who are yet to marry, since Indian cultural norms dictate that, upon marriage, a woman leaves her home and/ or village and migrates to that of her husband.
- ASHAs must have qualified up to the tenth grade; if there is no suitable literate candidate, this criterion may be relaxed.
- They must preferably be between the ages of 25 and 45.
- They are selected by and accountable to the gram panchayat (local government).

== Remuneration ==
Although ASHAs are considered volunteers, they receive outcome-based remuneration and financial compensation for training days. For example, if an ASHA facilitates an institutional delivery she receives ₹600 (US$6.20) and the mother receives ₹1,400 (US$15). ASHAs also receive ₹150 (US$1.60) for each child completing an immunization session and ₹150 (US$1.60) for each individual who undergoes family planning. ASHAs are expected to attend a Wednesday meeting at the local primary health centre (PHC); beyond this requirement, the time ASHAs spend on their CHW tasks is relatively flexible.

An ASHA's monthly salary has two components:

- A fixed component of Rs. 4,000/- (USD 53/- approximately), and
- Incentives that vary from Rs. 5,000/- (USD 67/- approximately) to Rs. 8,000/- (USD 107 approximately), including a "COVID Bonus".

The average monthly salary comes to around Rs. 10,000/- (USD 133/- approximately).

== Monitoring and Evaluation under National Rural Health Mission ==
A baseline survey was taken at the district level, for fixing decentralized monitoring goals and indicators. Community monitoring is at the village level. The Planning Commission is the ultimate agency for monitoring outcomes. External evaluation is taken up at regular intervals.

== See also ==
- Auxiliary Nurse Midwife (ANM)
- Vikas yojna
- Jawaharlal Nehru National Urban Renewal Mission
- Mahatma Gandhi National Rural Employment Guarantee Act
