= Emergency Police Centre =

Emergency Police Centre of NAJA (Persian: مرکز فوریت‌های پلیسی ناجا) commonly known with its emergency telephone number as Police-110 (Persian: پلیس ۱۱۰) is a dispatcher center of Law Enforcement Command of Islamic Republic of Iran which sends emergency responder units. In an emergency, the police can be reached by dialing 110 from any telephone in Iran.
