= Firefighting in Australia =

In Australia, fire services are operated at the state/territory level. Generally, there are three types of firefighting organisations, though this varies by state. One is salaried and mostly handles urban areas, one is volunteer and generally handles rural areas, and one handles government managed public land (mainly forests and plantations).

== Equipment ==
Firefighting agencies in Australia use a variety of technologies for detection, prevention, and emergency response.

=== AI detection cameras ===
On 18 September 2025, the New South Wales Government announced the rollout of AI powered cameras used to detect fires across state forests used for soft wood plantations. These will be used during the 2025-26 Australian bushfire season.

== Firefighting agencies by state ==
=== Australian Capital Territory (ACT) ===
- ACT Fire and Rescue
- ACT Rural Fire Service

=== New South Wales ===
- Fire and Rescue NSW
- New South Wales Rural Fire Service
- National Parks and Wildlife Service (New South Wales)
- Forestry Corporation of NSW

=== Northern Territory ===
- Northern Territory Fire and Rescue Service

=== Queensland ===
- Queensland Fire Department

=== South Australia ===
- South Australian Metropolitan Fire Service
- South Australian Country Fire Service

=== Tasmania ===
- Tasmania Fire Service

=== Victoria ===
- Fire Rescue Victoria
- Country Fire Authority (CFA)
- Forest Fire Management Victoria

=== Western Australia ===
- Department of Fire and Emergency Services is the overarching body. The fire services consist of the:
  - Career Fire and Rescue Service (FRS)
  - Volunteer Bush Fire Service (BFS)
  - Volunteer Fire and Emergency Services (VFES)
  - Volunteer Fire and Rescue Service (VFRS)
