= GVK EMRI =

Indian nonprofit care organization

- GVK Emergency Management and Research Institute
- Formation: 2005
- Headquarters: Hyderabad, Telangana
- Region served: India
- Parent organization: GVK
- Staff: 47,000+
- Website: http://www.emri.in

GVK EMRI is an Indian not-for-profit organisation and the largest ambulatory care provider in the world, providing emergency medical services coverage to 800 million people across India and Sri Lanka.

== History ==
Dr. AP Ranga Rao is credited with first conceptualizing 108 ambulance services in India, having spent 10 years working with the National Health Service in Britain learning about emergency systems.

In January 2005, the CEO of an Indian-based, German multinational corporation, Venkat Changavalli, invited Ramalinga Raju, the Chairman of Satyam Computer Services at the time, to be the chief guest at a business conference. After the conference, Raju proposed creating an emergency medical services organization for India, and the Satyam Foundation began initial its operations. Emergency Management & Research Institute (EMRI) was separately founded and on April 15, 2005, Changavalli became the CEO of EMRI. Satyam Foundation's operations were later integrated into EMRI, with Satyam Computers (later purchased by Tech Mahindra) remaining the technology partner. EMRI was launched on August 15, 2005 with 14 ambulances and 70 employees in Andhra Pradesh.

When Raju was imprisoned for corporate fraud in January 2009, Changavalli had grown EMRI to eight states across India as CEO. The scandal compromised EMRI, which had to operate without funding for four months while receiving funding assurances from the Chief Minister of Andhra Pradesh, YS Rajasekhara Reddy, until May, at which point GVK acquired EMRI, rebranding the organization as "GVK EMRI." In 2013, Changavalli stepped down as CEO of GVK EMRI.

In 2015, GVK EMRI signed an MoU to expand its operations to Sri Lanka, and had expanded there by the end of the year.

GVK EMRI began digitizing their operations in 2016.

By 2017, GVK EMRI had expanded to 14 states and partnered with Robert Bosch GmbH to improve their technology usage.

== Structure ==
EMRI was structured as a not-for-profit and continues to operate via public-private partnerships created with the government of Indian states. EMRI services are provisioned to the public free of charge. 85 to 90% of patients treated are the poorest people in India. EMRI's ambulance system is financially supported by state governments, the federal government, and by philanthropic contributions.

GVK EMRI's service has grown to 16 states and a fleet of 10,000 ambulances and 47,000 employees, becoming recognized as the world's largest ambulatory provider, providing emergency medical coverage to 800 million people. GVK EMRI's 27 dispatch centers receive 130,000 calls per day, to which GVK EMRI emergency medical providers respond to 80,000 emergency calls and assist with 200 childbirths per day, claiming to save 800 lives daily. GVK EMRI said its service saved more than 1.5 million lives between 2005 and 2015, though no outside entity has verified its claim. In a study published in Health Affairs in 2016, research conducted in two Indian states where GVK EMRI operates demonstrated their service helped reduce neonatal and infant mortality.

To enhance efficiency, GVK EMRI centralized and vertically integrated dispatchers at call centers with the prehospital emergency care providers, dissimilar to American 911 models in which dispatch centers may be distinct from the organizations providing care.

GVK EMRI has partnered with Stanford Medicine faculty to conduct needs assessments and improve the quality of emergency care, as well as faculty from Michigan Medicine to conduct trainings of laypeople and develop specific trauma resuscitation protocols, while training educators and researching emergency stabilization centers.
