= 2023 Optus outage =

Nationwide Australian network outage

- Date: 8 November 2023
- Time: 04:05 (AEDT)
- Duration: 04:05 – 16:00 (approx. 12–13 hours)
- Location: Australia (nationwide)
- Type: Network outage
- Cause: Automated shutdown due to BGP event.
- Outcome: Disruption across government and private sectors; Landline-based Emergency 000 calls failing; A$2 billion stock loss to Optus; Investigations including Senate inquiry into the outage
- Inquiries: Senate inquiry

On 8 November 2023, an unplanned network outage occurred, consisting of all Optus internet, cellular and fixed-line services in Australia at 04:05 AEDT. The outage caused disruption across government and corporate sectors including hospitals, banks, train services, EFTPOS payment systems, and calls to emergency services. Restoration was gradual, with some services being restored around 13:00 AEDT. The outage directly affected more than 10 million people, and 400,000 businesses, across Australia.

The cause was likely due to several routers disconnecting as an automated protective measure against routing update overload. Optus stated that the outage was not due to a cyberattack.

== Background ==
Optus is an Australian telecommunications company owned by Singtel. It is the second-largest wireless carrier in Australia, serving over 11 million customers in part with a mobile network that reached 98.5% of the population in 2023. About 25% of Australians use Optus for their cellular service, and around 19% for broadband internet.

== Summary ==
=== Outage ===
The outage began in the early morning on Wednesday, 8 November 2023, around 04:05 AEDT following a planned software upgrade to a Singtel North American exchange. The customer network began disconnecting first around 04:05, and some domain name services stopped working.

=== Restoration ===
Restoration was a large-scale effort across more than 100 devices at 14 sites nationwide and took several hours. The recovery was performed remotely, and in some cases, required physical access to sites. Services were restored gradually, with 11% restored by 11:30 am AEDT, and 88% by 13:00 AEDT. By 18:00 AEDT, Optus said that most of its services had been restored, though connectivity was intermittent until 9 November 2023.

== Impact ==
The outage impacted all internet, cellular, and fixed-line services using the Optus network in Australia. Public and private sectors, such as banks, hospitals, universities, and some train services were impacted. Some people were unable to call emergency services. Many businesses were unable to take digital payments via EFTPOS. Dodo and Amaysim, which both rely on the Optus network as resellers, experienced outages across the country. Aussie Broadband and Moose Mobile customers were also affected.

A citywide Metro Trains Melbourne shutdown lasted from 05:00 to 06:00 due to drivers not being able to communicate with the control centre, causing hundreds of trains to be cancelled throughout the day on the Melbourne suburban network.

Singtel lost over AU$2 billion in value over the day of the outage after its share price dropped 4.8% on the SGX.

== Response ==
On 9 November 2023, Optus CEO Kelly Bayer Rosmarin announced that customers on post-paid mobile plans would be able to access 200 GB of extra mobile data, stating that mobile data was "much more valuable" than refunding customers. The 200 GB of data must have been activated between 13 November 2023, and the end of the calendar year. An Optus spokesperson later stated that eligible prepaid mobile users were being given unlimited data on weekends, for the remainder of the year, beginning on 18 November. The spokesperson noted that if any businesses were "uniquely impacted" during the outage, they should contact Optus' Business Centre directly.

Despite this, user sentiment was overwhelmingly negative, with many businesses being forced to shut down for the day and incur massive losses. In addition to Optus suffering an A$2 billion stock loss (more than 5%), rival telecom companies such as Telstra and Vodafone saw an increase in customers due to the mass exodus, with some industry analysts, such as JPMorgan Chase, predicting that Telstra alone could increase its earnings projections by A$125 million over the next few years if even just 2.5% of customers were to sever their ties with Optus. On 20 November 2023, Bayer Rosmarin resigned as CEO.

== Reactions ==
The outage raised concerns about the move to a cashless society, and Australia's over-reliance on internet access.

South Australia's government is reconsidering using Optus as its service provider.

The federal government called for financial compensation to those affected by the outage. Communications Minister Michelle Rowland announced a review into the matter. The Australian Senate also passed a motion to hold a public Senate inquiry into the outage.

== Causes ==
A Border Gateway Protocol (BGP) routing problem played a role in the outage. Public data from Cloudflare showed a spike in BGP route announcements from the Optus network around the time the outage occurred — over 940,000 announcements in an hour from a node that normally makes less than 3,000 announcements per hour — indicative of a BGP routing problem.

A submission tabled to the Australian Senate Standing Committee on Environment and Communications committee describes the outage as a gradual event triggered by loss of connectivity between neighbouring computer networks. The report suggests that approximately 90 edge provider routers disconnected, as an automated protective measure against routing update overload. The failures occurred following a software upgrade at a North American Singtel exchange that caused one of the routers to disconnect. This, in turn, triggered Optus's routers to rapidly update its own routing tables, which triggered the shutdown due to the pre-configured default threshold limits set by Cisco Systems being exceeded. The tabled report and Singtel stressed that the software upgrade was not the cause of the fault.

== See also ==
- 2022 Rogers Communications outage
- Telecommunications in Australia
