= 106 (emergency telephone number) =

Australian national emergency telephone number for textphones

Textphone / TTY hearing or speech impairment (106) logo

106 Text Emergency Call, commonly known as simply 106, is the Australian national emergency telephone number to be used in life-threatening or time critical situations for those with a speech and / or hearing impairment who use telecommunications device for the deaf (textphone or teletypewriter (TTY)). It is run by the emergency telephone operator for the National Relay Service (NRS); formerly the Australian Communications Exchange (ACE), a non-profit organisation that provided the relay services component for the NRS. 106 can only be used by people with a TTY / textphone, or a computer with terminal software (TTY imitation software) and a modem. 106 calls are given priority over other calls handled by the National Relay Service. 106 is a free-to-call number.

== Usage ==
Callers to the free 106 Text Emergency Call number will be asked to type PPP for police, FFF for fire, or AAA for ambulance. The relay officer will then call the requested emergency service, and relay the call on behalf of the caller. An able caller can also just say 'police', 'fire', or 'ambulance' to the relay officer. The relay operator will stay on the line during the entire conversation with the connected emergency service.

Being as all textphone or teletypewriter (TTY) devices are connected to a fixed telephone line (or landline), the emergency service operator will be automatically able to determine your geographic location where you are making your call from, however, you will still be asked to confirm the exact address of where the emergency is located.

It is not possible to call 106 from an ordinary telephone (landline or mobile phone), nor send an SMS text message, nor use IRC internet relay. It can only be called from a textphone or teletypewriter (TTY) device.

== See also ==
- Australian Communications and Media Authority (ACMA) — official telecommunications regulator in Australia
