= National Health Mission =

Public health initiative in India

National Health Mission (NHM)

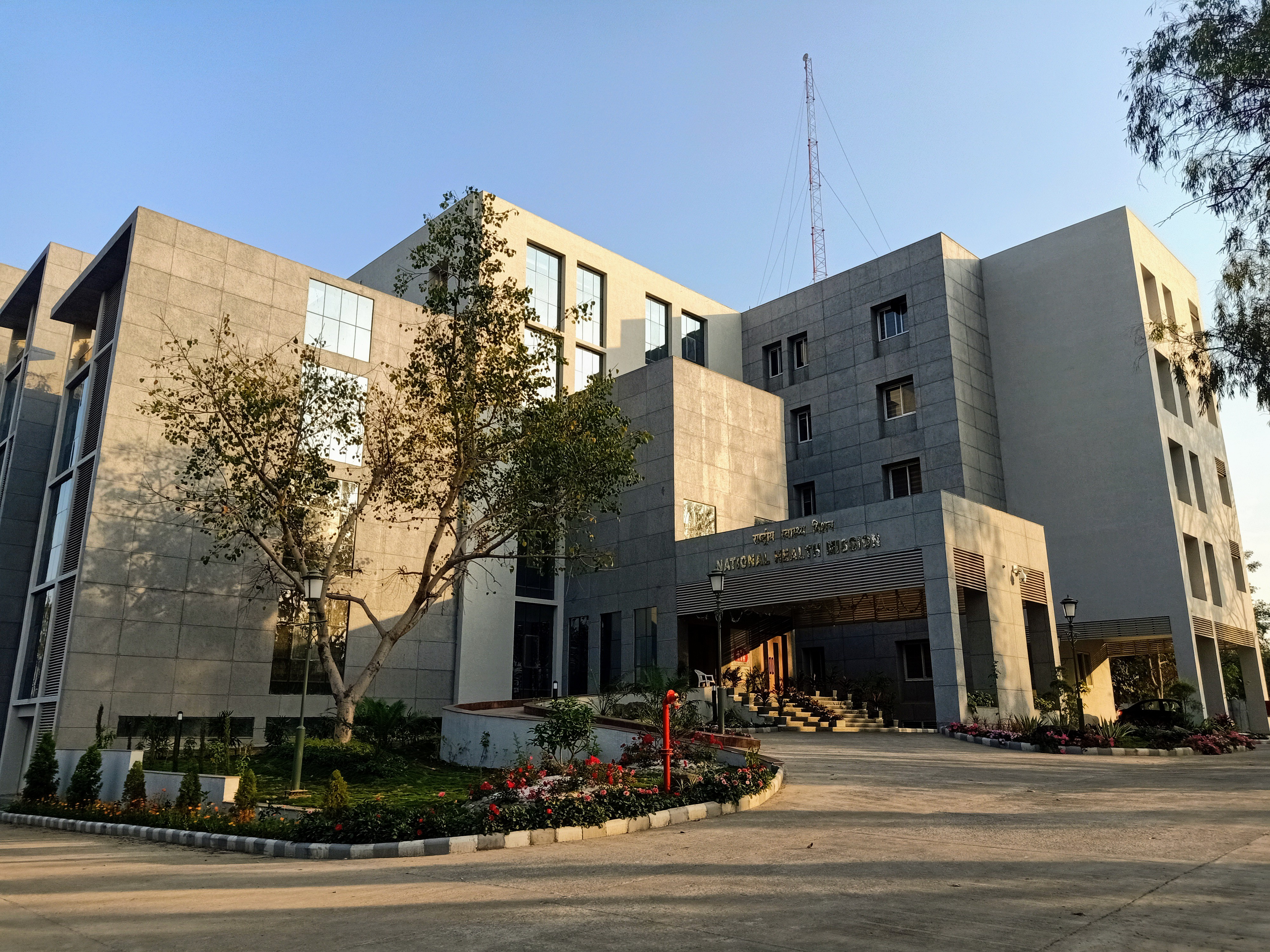
- National Health Mission, Bhopal India
- Country: India
- Ministry: Ministry of Health & Family Welfare
- Key people: Ministry of Health and Family Welfare Anbumani Ramadoss
- Launched: 12 April 2005
- Status: Active
- Website: nhm.gov.in

The National Health Mission (NHM) was launched by the government of India in 2013 subsuming the National Rural Health Mission (NRHM) and the later launched National Urban Health Mission (NUHM). It was further extended in March 2018, to continue until March 2020. It is headed by Mission Director and monitored by National Level Monitors appointed by Government of India. The main program components include Health System Strengthening (RMNCH+A) in rural and urban areas- Reproductive-Maternal- Neonatal-Child and Adolescent Health, and Communicable and Non-Communicable Diseases. NHM envisages achievement of universal access to equitable, affordable and quality health care services that are accountable and responsive to the needs of the people.

== History ==
The National Rural Health Mission (NRHM), now under National Health Mission is an initiative undertaken by the Government of India to address the health needs of under-served rural areas. Launched on 12 April 2005 by then Prime Minister of India Manmohan Singh, the NRHM was initially tasked with addressing the health needs of 18 states that had been identified as having weak public health indicators. The Union Council of Ministers headed by Manmohan Singh vide its decision dated 1 May 2013, has approved the launch of National Urban Health Mission (NUHM) as a Sub-mission of an overarching National Health Mission (NHM), with National Rural Health Mission (NRHM) being the other Sub-mission of National Health Mission.

Under the NRHM, the Empowered Action Group (EAG) States as well as North Eastern States, Jammu and Kashmir and Himachal Pradesh have been given special focus. The thrust of the mission is on establishing a fully functional, community owned, decentralized health delivery system with inter-sectoral convergence at all levels, to ensure simultaneous action on a wide range of determinants of health such as water, sanitation, education, nutrition, social and gender equality. Institutional integration within the fragmented health sector was expected to provide a focus on outcomes, measured against Indian Public Health Standards for all health facilities. As per the 12th Plan document of the Planning Commission, the flagship programme of NRHM will be strengthened under the umbrella of National Health Mission. The focus on covering rural areas and rural population will continue along with up scaling of NRHM to include non-communicable diseases and expanding health coverage to urban areas. Accordingly, the Union Cabinet, in May 2013, has approved the launch of National Urban Health Mission (NUHM) as a sub-mission of an overarching National Health Mission (NHM), with National Rural Health Mission (NRHM) being the other sub-mission of the National Health Mission.

It was further extended in March 2018, to continue till March 2020.

== Initiatives ==
=== Accredited community Health Activists ===
Community Health volunteers called Accredited community Health Activist (ACHA) have been engaged under the mission for establishing a link between the community and the health system. ACHA is the first port of call for any health related demands of deprived sections of the population, especially women and children, who find it difficult to access health services in rural areas. ASHA Programme is expanding across States and has particularly been successful in bringing people back to Public Health System and has increased the utilization of outpatient services, diagnostic facilities, institutional deliveries and inpatient . There is one ASHA for 1000 population.

=== Rogi Kalyan Samiti (Patient Welfare Committee) / Hospital Management Society ===
The Rogi Kalyan Samiti (Patient Welfare Committee) / Hospital Management Society is a management structure that acts as a group of trustees for the hospitals to manage the affairs of the hospital. Financial assistance is provided to these Committees through untied fund to undertake activities for patient welfare.

=== Untied Grants to Sub-Centres ===
Untied Grants to Sub-Centers have been used to fund grass-root improvements in health care. Some examples include:

- Improved efficacy of Auxiliary Nurse Midwives (ANMs) in the field that can now undertake better antenatal care and other health care services.
- Village Health Sanitation and Nutrition Committees (VHSNC) have used untied grants to increase their involvement in their local communities to address the needs of poor households and children.

=== Health care contractors ===
NRHM has provided health care contractors to underserved areas, and has been involved in training to expand the skill set of doctors at strategically located facilities identified by the states. Training programs have also been introduced for nursing staff and auxiliary workers such as ANMs to strengthen the healthcare workforce. NHM also supports co-location of AYUSH services in Health facilities such as PHCs, CHCs and District Hospitals.

=== Janani Suraksha Yojana ===
Janani Suraksha Yojana (JSY) is a safe motherhood intervention scheme implemented by the Government of India. It was launched on 12 April 2005 by the Prime Minister of India. It aims to promote institutional delivery among poor pregnant women and to reduce neo-natal mortality and maternal mortality. It is operated under the Ministry of Health and Family Welfare as part of the National Rural Health Mission. The Scheme integrates cash assistance with delivery and post-delivery care, particularly in states with low institutional delivery rates.

In 2014 -15, 10,438,000 women obtained benefits under the scheme. As per the World Health Organization, the proportion of institutional deliveries in India almost tripled between 2005 and 2016, from 18% to 52%.

==== Components of the scheme ====
The Janani Suraksha Yojana was implemented to ensure that pregnant women who are Below the Poverty Line (BPL) access health facilities for childbirth. It provides cash benefit to eligible pregnant women if they choose to deliver in a health facility, irrespective of their age and the number of children they have.

Special dispensation is provided to states that have low institutional delivery rates. These states are Uttar Pradesh, Uttarakhand, Bihar, Jharkhand, Madhya Pradesh, Chhattisgarh, Assam, Rajasthan, Odisha, and Jammu and Kashmir, and are referred to as Low Performing States (LPS) under the Scheme. Other states and Union Territories are called High Performing States (HPS) owing to their higher institutional delivery rates.

Accredited Social Health Activists (ASHA) are also incentivised under the Scheme for promoting institutional deliveries among pregnant women.

==== Entitlements under the scheme ====
The Scheme has different eligibility criteria in Low Performing States (LPS) and High Performing States (HPS).

In LPS, all pregnant women delivering in government health facilities are eligible for a cash benefit. Women who choose to deliver in accredited private institutions are eligible only if they are Below the Poverty Line or belong to a Scheduled Caste or Scheduled Tribe.

In HPS, only pregnant women who are Below Poverty Line or belong to a Scheduled Caste or Scheduled Tribe are eligible for cash benefits, irrespective of whether they choose to deliver in a government health facility or an accredited private institution.

Women who are Below the Poverty Line and choose to deliver at home are entitled to a cash assistance of ₹500 per delivery.

The cash entitlements under the Scheme are as follows

All values in ₹ (INR)
Category	Rural		Urban	
	Mother's Package	ASHA's Package	Mother's Package	ASHA's Package
LPS	1400	600	1000	400
HPS	700	600	600	400

ASHA package of ₹600 in rural areas includes ₹300 for antenatal care and ₹300 for facilitating institutional delivery. In urban areas, ₹400 include ₹200 for antenatal component and ₹200 for facilitating institutional delivery.

In 2013, the Ministry of Health and Family Welfare introduced direct payment of the entitlement to the beneficiary's bank accounts in 121 districts across the country.

==== Impact ====
The number of beneficiaries under the Scheme from 2012–13 to 2014-15 were as follows

Number of beneficiaries under the Scheme from 2012–13 to 2014-15
Year	Number of beneficiaries
2012-13	1,06,57,091
2013-14	1,06,48,487
2014-15	1,04,38,905

Of the beneficiaries reported in 2014–15, 87% belonged to rural areas. In the same year, about 9 lakh ASHA workers also received incentives for promoting institutional deliveries among pregnant women.

During 2006 - 2008, the Scheme may also have resulted in a 7% - 12% rise in the probability of childbirth or pregnancy in 10 states.

The Infant Mortality rate in the country since the implementation of the scheme has been as follows

Infant Mortality Rate in India - per 1000 live births
Year	Infant Mortality Rate
2005	55.7
2006	53.7
2007	51.6
2008	49.5
2009	47.4
2010	45.3
2011	43.2
2012	41.1
2013	39.1
2014	37.2
2015	35.3

The maternal mortality ratio in India since the implementation of the scheme has been as follows

Maternal Mortality Ratio - National Estimate per 100,000 births
Year	Maternal Mortality Ratio
2006	250
2009	210
2012	180
2013	170

=== National Mobile Medical Units (NMMUs) ===
Many un-served areas have been covered through National Mobile Medical Units (NMMUs).

=== National ambulance services ===
Free ambulance services are provided in every nook and corner of the country connected with a toll free number and reaches within 30 minutes of the call.

=== Janani Shishu Suraksha Karyakram (JSSK) ===
As part of recent initiatives and further moving in the direction of universal healthcare, Janani Shishu Suraksha Karyakarm (JSSK) was introduced to provide free transport, free drugs, free diagnostic, free blood, free diet to pregnant women who come for delivery in public health institutions and sick infants up to one year.

=== Rashtriya Bal Swasthya Karyakram (RBSK) ===
A Child Health Screening and Early Intervention Services has been launched in February 2013 to screen diseases specific to childhood, developmental delays, disabilities, birth defects and deficiencies. The initiative will cover about 27 crore children between 0–18 years of age and also provide free treatment including surgery for health problems diagnosed under this initiative.

=== Mother and child health wings (MCH Wings) ===
With a focus to reduce maternal and child mortality, dedicated Mother and Child Health Wings with 100/50/30 bed capacity have been sanctioned in high case load district hospitals and CHCs which would create additional beds for mothers and children.

=== Free drugs and free diagnostic service ===
A new initiative is launched under the National Health Mission to provide Free Drugs Service and Free Diagnostic Service with a motive to lower the out of pocket expenditure on health.

=== District hospital and knowledge center (DHKC) ===
As a new initiative District Hospitals are being strengthened to provide Multi-specialty health care including dialysis care, intensive cardiac care, cancer treatment, mental illness, emergency medical and trauma care etc. These hospitals would act as the knowledge support for clinical care in facilities below it through a tele-medicine center located in the district headquarters and also developed as centers for training of paramedics and nurses.

=== National Iron+ Initiative ===
The National Iron+ Initiative is an attempt to look at Iron Deficiency Anaemia in which beneficiaries will receive iron and folic acid supplementation irrespective of their Iron/Hb status. This initiative will bring together existing programmes (IFA supplementation for: pregnant and lactating women and; children in the age group of 6–60 months) and introduce new age groups.

=== Tribal TB eradication project ===
This project is launched by MoS Health Shri Faggan Singh Kulaste at Mandla on 20 January 2017.

== See also ==
- Integrated Child Development Services
- Accredited Social Health Activist
- Healthcare in India
- National TB Elimination Program (India)
