= Dispatch (logistics) =

Procedure for assigning employees to customers

Dispatch is a procedure for assigning employees (workers) or vehicles to customers. Industries that dispatch include taxicabs, couriers, emergency services, as well as home and commercial services such as maid services, plumbing, HVAC, pest control and electricians.

With vehicle dispatching, clients are matched to vehicles according to the order in which clients called and the proximity of vehicles to each client's pick-up location. Telephone operators take calls from clients, then either enter the client's information into a computer or write it down and give it to a dispatcher. In some cases, calls may be assigned a priority by the call-taker. Priority calls may jump the queue of pending calls. In the first scenario, a central computer then communicates with the mobile data terminal located in each vehicle (see computer assisted dispatch); in the second, the dispatcher communicates with the driver of each vehicle via two-way radio.

With home or commercial service dispatching, customers usually schedule services in advance and the dispatching occurs the morning of the scheduled service. Depending on the type of service, workers are dispatched individually or in teams of two or more. Dispatchers have to coordinate worker availability, skill, travel time and availability of parts. The skills required of a dispatcher are greatly enhanced with the use of computer dispatching software (see computer aided call handling).

== Manual dispatch systems ==
The following are examples of manual systems used to track the status of resources in a dispatched fleet.

=== Cards ===
Card systems employ a set of shelves with a slot for each unit in the dispatch fleet. Each vehicle or resource has a slot in the shelving system. In it, a card, like a time card used to track an employee's work hours, is stored. A time clock, similar to the one that stamps work hours on a time card, is used to stamp event times on each card. At the beginning of a work day, the resource's identifier or other information is handwritten on the card. Each time the resource's status changes, the card is punched in the time clock and a new status entry is handwritten on the card. The card collects a series of entries through the work shift.

In a tow truck example, the card might be labeled with the tow car's radio identifier, "Downtown 6" and may be labeled with the vehicle number or data about the capabilities of the specific tow car. It might give a weight capacity, show the unit as a flat bed or cradle snatcher, or mention the unit carries a can of Diesel fuel. The name of the staff on the car might be noted. At the start of a shift, the dispatcher would note the unit "available" and time stamp the card. At the assignment to a call, the call information would be written on the card and the card might be stamped at the moment the assignment is read to the tow car crew. The string of notes and time stamps allows dispatch staff to get a clear picture of the status of a small fleet.

Some systems use shelving with red and green lights and a switch at the back of the card slot. If the resource's card is pushed all the way into the card slot, the switch is actuated and an indicator lamp turns red. This identifies the tow car whose card occupies that slot as not available, or assigned to a call. Leaving the card pulled partway out leaves the indicator green, showing the dispatcher that unit is available. Is anyone available? The lights are supposed to give the dispatch staff a snapshot of their resource situation.

A major flaw of this system is that cards are inside shelves and trying to look at an entire set of cards to evaluate the overall situation requires the dispatcher to pull out every card, one at a time, and read it. If two or more resources are sent to the same call, the dispatcher has a lot of writing to do.

=== Punched tags ===
Punched tag systems employ a set of pegs with each peg holding tags for one unit in the dispatch fleet. Each vehicle working the current shift has a peg with a tag describing the unit's current status. A time clock, similar to the one that stamps work hours on a time card, is used to stamp times on each tag. At the beginning of a work day, the resource's identifier may be posted above the peg. The unit's start time is stamped and their status is written on the tag. Each time the resource's status changes, a new tag is written and the tag is time stamped in order to log the time the unit's status changed. The peg collects a stack of tags through the work shift.

In a tow truck example, the peg might be labeled with the tow car's radio identifier, "Downtown 6" and may be labeled with the vehicle number or data about the capabilities of the specific tow car. It might give a weight capacity, show the unit as a flat bed or cradle snatcher, or mention the unit carries a can of Diesel fuel. The name of the staff on the tow car might be noted. At the start of a shift, the dispatcher would note the unit "available" and time stamp a tag, then hang it on that unit's peg. At the assignment to a call, the call information would be written on another tag and the tag might be stamped at the moment the assignment is read to the tow car crew. The tag would then be hung on that unit's peg. The stack of tags allows dispatch staff to get a clear picture of the status of a small fleet.

Some systems use colored tags to show general categories of events such as "available". For example, each unit that is available might have the fact noted on an orange tag. Is anyone available? A glance at the pegboard shows anybody whose tag is "orange" is available. An repossession might use a yellow tag to identify a service call with a safety issue where the police should be called in the event the tow car crew doesn't check in by radio within five minutes. A blue tag might show a resource is taking a dinner or lunch break.

A major flaw of this system is that tags can easily be posted on the wrong peg, causing confusion. This can be countered by writing unit identifiers on every tag: a lot of work. In colored-tag systems, it is always possible to run out of certain colors of tags, messing up the system. If two or more resources are sent to the same call, the dispatcher has a lot of writing to do.

=== Plastic icons ===
In a plastic icon system, the blank panel on the communications console or a nearby wall is fitted with a sheet of Velcro. The material has vertical stripes painted on it, making a column for each of several possible status conditions. The simplest system is two columns: available and unavailable. Magnetized icons can be used in place of Velcro. The icons can be coloured or shaped to identify the type of unit or some other feature of the resource.

Each vehicle working the current shift has an icon placed in the column describing the unit's current status. A log book is used to track times, event details, and other information about calls for service. In a tow truck example, the icon might be labelled with the tow car's radio identifier, "Down town 6". During a shift, the icon would be moved by the dispatcher into whatever column describes the resource's current condition. Alternatively, there could be columns for some other condition such as the names of move-up or standby points where resources are sent to backfill for busy tow cars.

A major flaw of this system is that icons can easily be misplaced or fall off of the status board. Magnetic objects can damage cathode ray tube displays if they get too close to the display face or housing.

== Airline dispatch ==
In airline operations in a few countries, a dispatcher shares legal responsibility for a flight's safety with its pilot, and may delay, divert or cancel a flight if there is reason to do so. This checks and balances mechanism supposedly improves the safety of the dispatch system, although most countries do not use this system and there is no noticeable detriment to flight safety. A dispatcher typically must be licensed by the aviation authority of a country. The examination for the licence requires the candidate to demonstrate knowledge in meteorology and aviation comparable to that required to obtain an Airline Transport Pilot Licence.

== Mobile dispatch ==
In a mobile system, wireless technology is provided for efficient job planning, assignment and efficient job planning through the use of mobile dispatch systems sent out through a mobile network on to a mobile device such as PDA. This allows for more flexible management of the workers out in the field as a job can be dispatched to multiple users to accept or reject the job. The benefits of a mobile system as it can then be integrated back into the other software systems used by an organization such as asset management, rostering, and other financial systems.

== Trucking dispatch ==
Trucking dispatchers play a major role in transportation logistics. Truck dispatchers orchestrate freight movement and equipment from one place to another while keeping close communication with truck drivers. Some dispatching companies help truck drivers to negotiate and acquire loads and handle paperwork. Dispatching trucks require a variety of skills like using a computer to find and track loads for drivers to speaking multiple languages depending on the region or number of trucks they manage. Great customer service and good communication are vital for succeeding in this fast-paced environment.

== Capacity and metrics ==
There is a limit to how many field units can be managed. This varies with circumstances. For example, a parcel delivery service dispatcher may encounter higher traffic around Christmas. Work is not evenly distributed across time: in any dispatch system there are traditional peaks or busy hours in requests for service. Some workplace cultures will allow longer wait times than others.

Systems may use a Radiotelephony procedure to reduce talking time, allowing interaction with a larger dispatch fleet. Air traffic control and towing are two examples. The use of abbreviations or standard phrases can reduce the length of a transaction. Capacity may be reduced by relaxed voice procedure such as a delivery dispatcher giving a lengthy description of a customer complaint over the radio.

It is generally accepted that giving field units computers connected with the computer-aided dispatch, or another enterprise system used for dispatch, unloads voice two-way radio channels and increases capacity. Users research information on their terminal or laptop instead of calling in with a request that the dispatcher do it. One source suggests radio traffic drops by 30% when computers are available to mobile users.

=== Radio ===
Measurements of communications may reflect dispatch capacity. A partial definition of capacity comes from the number of communications channels required to support a dispatch fleet. Two metrics of channel capacity may be: 1) the number of field units or resources dispatched, and; 2)number of push-to-talk presses per day. A resource may refer to a fire engine, tow truck, taxi, or refuse truck, regardless of how many walkie-talkies, mobile radios, or persons were fielded along with each resource.

One suggestion is that 100 to 150 mobiles is the maximum practical on one channel. Another suggests 60-70 units as a maximum. The difference in these two ranges probably reflects the wording. For example, 120 mobiles may mean radios: 60 units each containing a mobile radio and an officer with a walkie talkie. For dispatch systems like take-out food delivery, where life safety is not an issue, delays may be acceptable. Delays increase capacity.

Another possible measure of capacity is system push-to-talk presses. A 187-day study of four Contra Costa County, California Sheriffs Department conventional two-way radio dispatch channels showed an average of around 2,500 push-to-talk presses per day. The count was within +/-350 a day across all four primary dispatch channels.

=== Telephone ===
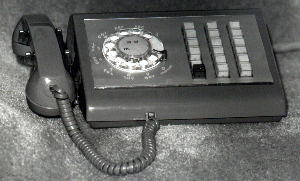
Multi-line phones are seen in many dispatching facilities. Rotary dials are rare.

A method used for telephone traffic analysis may fit some circumstances. One evaluation looked at 1) peak of busy hour usage, 2) average hourly usage, 3) message length in seconds, 4) maximum delay or wait time desirable, and; 5) maximum percent of users being delayed. Traffic analysis can be applied to radio or telephone communications.

Most office telephone systems have some facility for recording calling volumes, and incoming call timing. Dispatch centers use Automatic call distribution (ACD) groups which can be evaluated for metrics such as average wait time, abandoned calls, and calls per hour. These numeric data can be entered into spreadsheets for analysis of trends.

In dispatching, US emergency medical services literature suggests that telephone calls to a dispatching facility should be answered in the first few rings. One document suggests emergency calls to dispatch should result in busy signals once per 100 calls during the busiest hour. In business call centers, similar standards are suggested by consultants in order to provide an ideal customer experience and to outperform competing services. Sufficient staffing should be in place so that 90% of emergency calls are, "...answered within 10 seconds, or with no greater than three rings, during the average busy hour," according to one source. Tolerable wait times vary from one culture and region to another: some cultures expect immediate service; others will tolerate waits for some services. Regardless of sector or industry, almost all dispatchers will spend virtually their entire work day on the phone, answering as many as a thousand calls in a single shift while multi tasking other aspects of the job. In many ways, being a dispatcher is really one person doing the work of three or four people. It consistently ranks as among the most stressful jobs in the industrialized world, with high blood pressure, fatigue, obesity, heart disease, and other stress/sedentary related health concerns existing at rates up to ten times the norm of any other occupation.

== Zone system to assign service calls ==
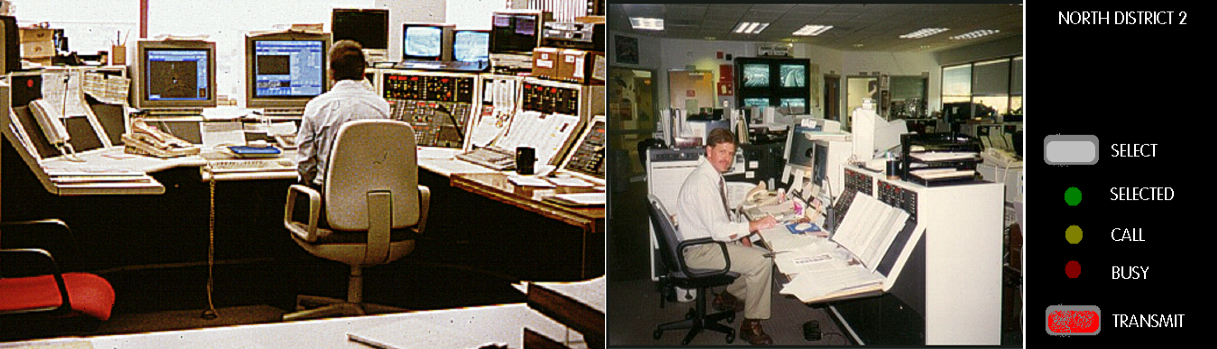
Dispatch consoles used by Denver RTD, a transit service provider in a US city. Drawing at right illustrates the controls associated with a single channel on the console. Photos courtesy of US Department of Transportation.

One method for organizing assignments in a manual dispatch system is to use a zone map system. Consider a community with four fire stations and two ambulance service providers. A grid is overlaid on a community map. Saint Proximal Medical Center ambulance is identified by the notation P while Distal Volunteer Rescue Squad is noted with a D.

Each zone of the grid is identified with a progression of ambulance zones and fire stations. One zone might be labeled: DP241. This means fire station 2, then 4, then 1, then 3 would respond to a fire call occurring inside this zone. If fire stations 2, 4, and 1 were assigned to calls, Station 3 would be sent to this zone. Distal Volunteer Rescue Squad would be first-up for an ambulance call occurring inside zone DP241.

The predefined order is created by persons with expertise in the service being provided, local geography, traffic, and patterns in calls for service. In assigning resources to a zone, decision-makers may consider that responding units must drive around freeways, lakes, or terrain obstructions in order to reach a zone. Zone boundaries and designations will periodically change as communities grow or lessons are learned during day-to-day operations. Consider a zone with an irrigation canal defining one boundary. If a car crashes into the canal, which zone is it in?

Zone systems may include standby, move-up, or backfill points. For example, taxi drivers working in a certain zone in the evening hours may expect night club patrons to need a ride. Consider a standby point at Main Street and Railroad Avenue named N. Some fares will come from radio calls to dispatch. A taxi driver, Car 4, may go to predefined standby location N. In some dispatching systems, the driver will call the dispatcher and report they are available and located at standby point N. The dispatcher may respond by reporting the driver's position in the queue, "Car 4, second N." The first call in this district would go to the driver ahead of Car 4. Car 4 would be assigned the second call.

If automatic vehicle location is available, it would display service vehicle locations on a map. The closest unit would be interpreted by the dispatcher looking at vehicle locations projected on the map.

== See also ==
- Flight dispatcher
- Key telephone system
- Private branch exchange
- Public safety answering point
- Taxi dispatching
