= Taxi =

Type of vehicle for hire with a driver

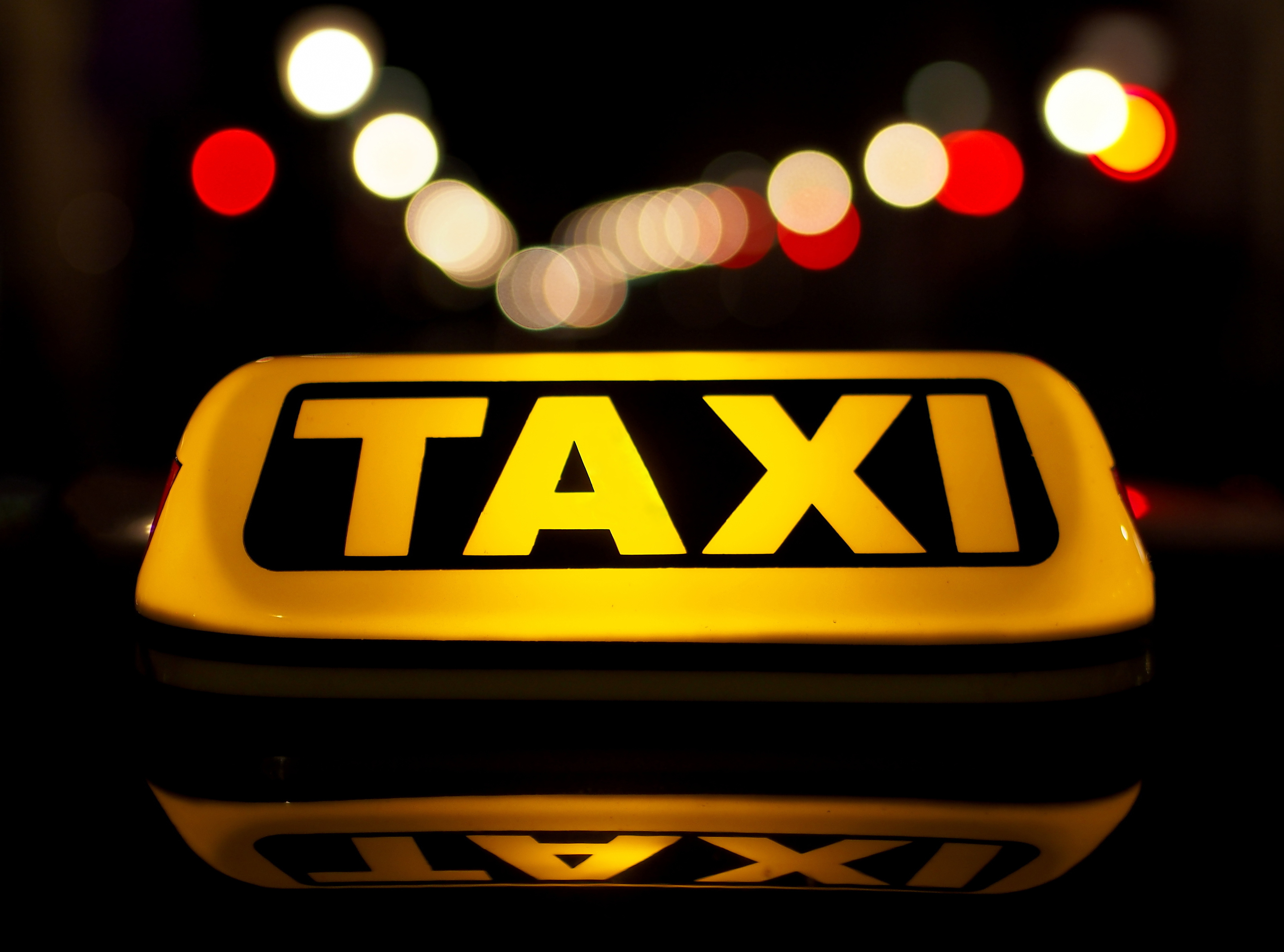
A luminous taxi top sign

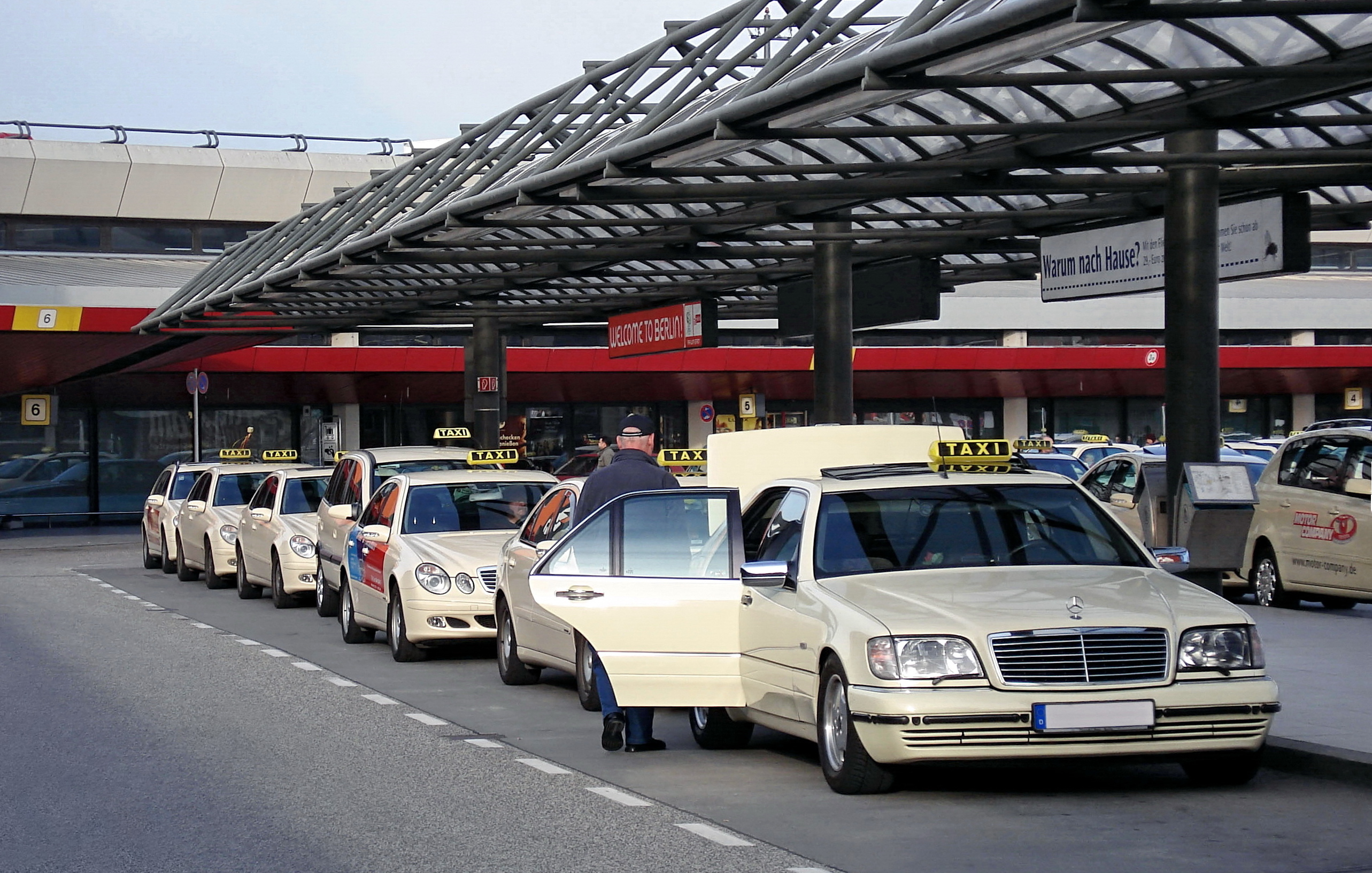
A taxi rank at Berlin Tegel Airport

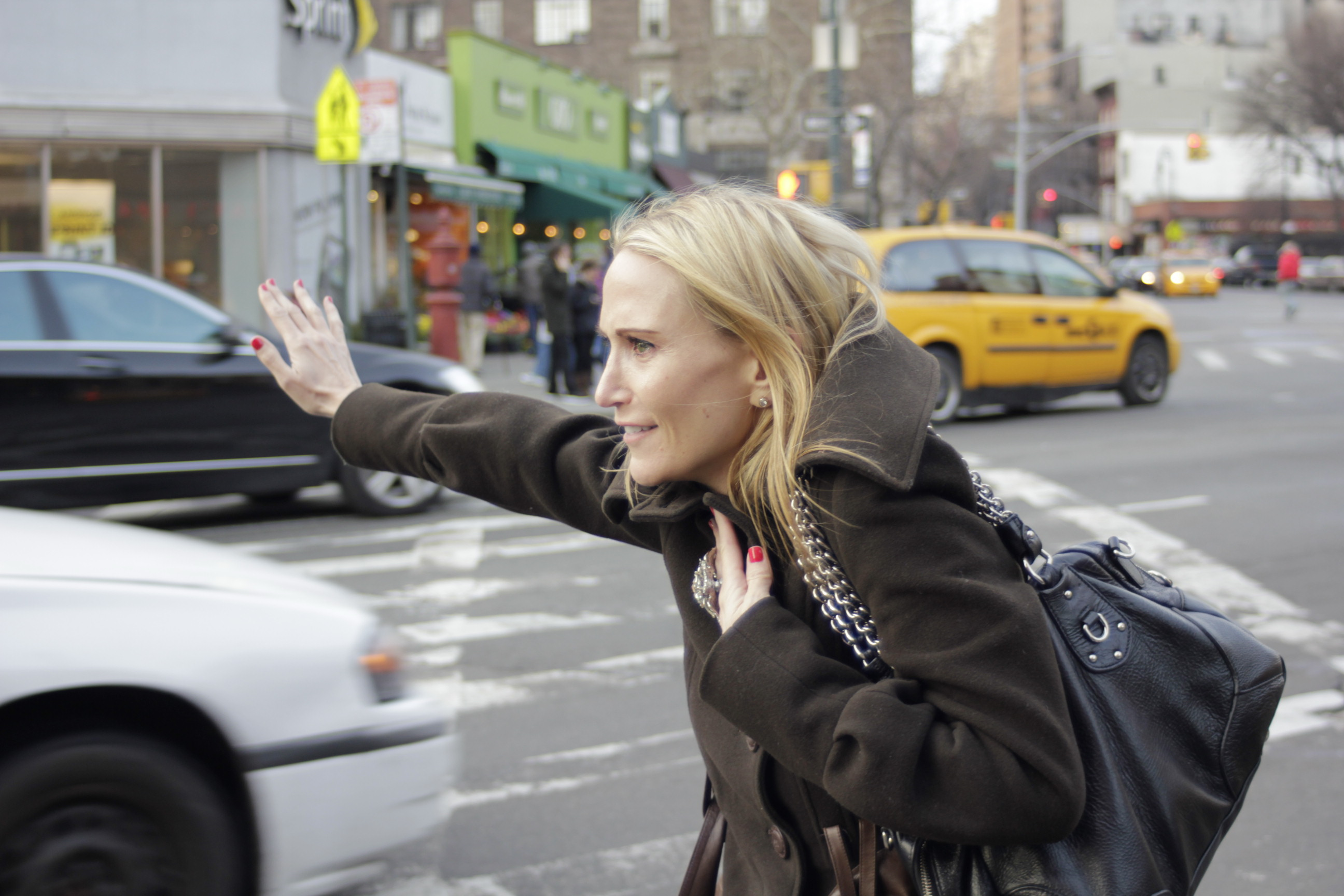
Hailing a taxi streetside

A taxi, also known as a taxicab or simply a cab, is a vehicle for hire that provides point-to-point transportation for passengers typically on an exclusive, non-shared basis. This differs from public transport, where pick-up and drop-off points are set by the service provider, although demand-responsive transport and share taxis provide hybrid bus/taxi modes.

Types of vehicles, methods of regulation, hiring, dispatching, and negotiating payment differ from country to country. The main forms of taxi are:

- Hackney carriages, also known as public hire, hailed or street taxis, licensed for hailing throughout communities
- Private hire vehicles, also known as minicabs or private hire taxis, licensed for pre-booking only
- Taxibuses, which come in many variations throughout the developing countries as jitneys or jeepney, operating on pre-set routes typified by multiple stops and multiple independent passengers
- Limousines, specialized vehicles licensed for operation by pre-booking

App-based ridesharing services offer similar point-to-point transport but are usually regulated separately from taxis.

== Etymology ==
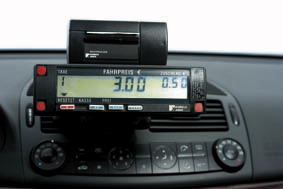
Taximeter

The word taxicab is a compound word formed as a contraction of taximeter and cabriolet. Taximeter is an adaptation of the German word Taxameter, which is itself a variant of the earlier German word Taxanom. Taxe /ˈtaksə/ is a German word meaning 'tax, charge, scale of charges'. The Medieval Latin word taxa also means 'tax, charge', from Classical Latin taxō (infinitive taxāre) 'to rate, appraise, value, estimate'. Meter is ultimately borrowed from Ancient Greek μέτρον (metron) 'measure'. A cabriolet is a type of horse-drawn carriage; the word comes from French cabrioler 'to leap, caper', from Italian capriolare 'to somersault', from Latin capreolus 'roebuck, wild goat'. In most European languages that word has taken on the meaning of a convertible car.

The taxicabs of Paris were equipped with the first meters beginning on 9 March 1898. They were originally called taxamètres, then renamed taximètres on 17 October 1904.

Harry Nathaniel Allen of The New York Taxicab Company, who imported the first 600 gas-powered New York City taxicabs from France in 1907, borrowed the word taxicab from London, where the word was in use by early 1907.

A popular but erroneous account holds that the vehicles were named after Franz von Taxis from the house of Thurn and Taxis, a 16th-century postmaster for Philip of Burgundy, and his nephew Johann Baptiste von Taxis, General Postmaster for the Holy Roman Empire. Both instituted fast and reliable postal services (conveying letters, with some post routes transporting people) across Europe. Their surname derives from their 13th-century ancestor Omodeo Tasso.

== History ==
=== Hackney carriages ===
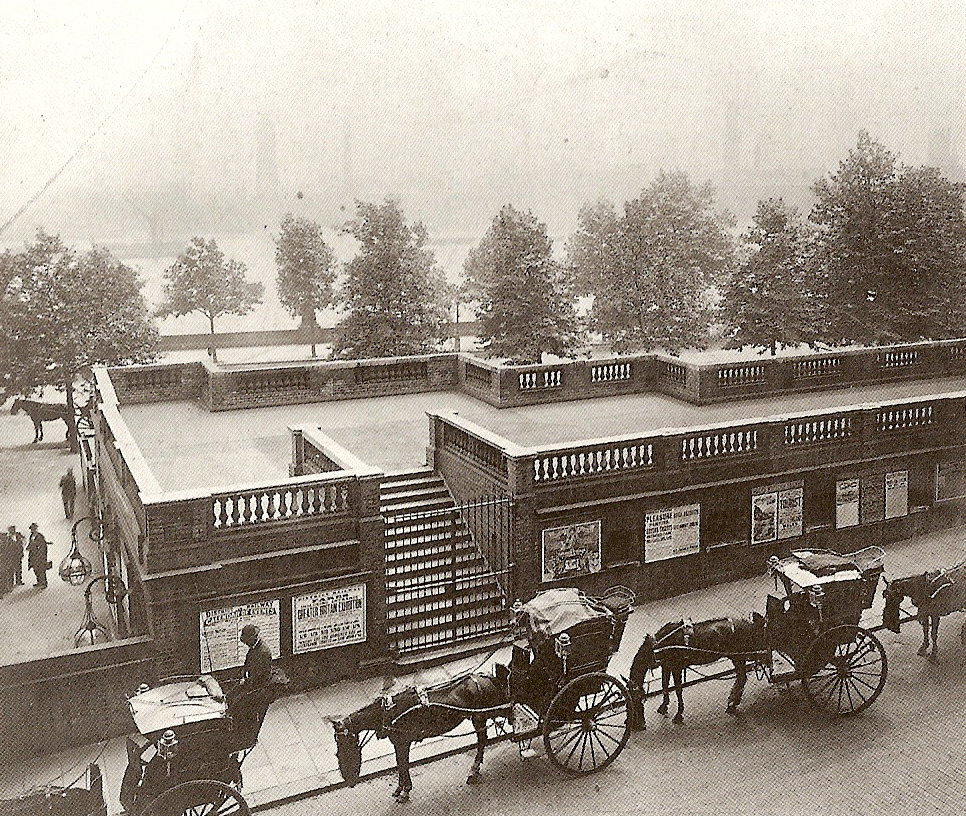
Line of cabbies for hire, 1899

Horse-drawn for-hire hackney carriage services began operating in both Paris and London in the early 17th century. The first documented public hackney coach service for hire was in London in 1605. In 1625 carriages were made available for hire from innkeepers in London and the first taxi rank appeared on the Strand outside the Maypole Inn in 1636. In 1635 the Hackney Carriage Act was passed by Parliament to legalise horse-drawn carriages for hire. Coaches were hired out by innkeepers to merchants and visitors. A further "Ordinance for the Regulation of Hackney-Coachmen in London and the places adjacent" was approved by Parliament in 1654 and the first hackney-carriage licences were issued in 1662.

A similar service was started by Nicolas Sauvage in Paris in 1637. His vehicles were known as fiacres, as the main vehicle depot apparently was opposite a shrine to Saint Fiacre. (The term fiacre is still used in French to describe a horse-drawn vehicle for hire, while the German term Fiaker is used, especially in Austria, to refer to the same thing.)

=== Hansoms ===
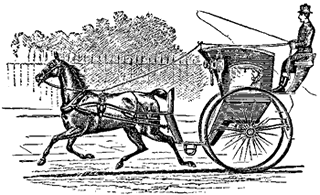
Drawing of a hansom cab

The hansom cab was designed and patented in 1834 by Joseph Hansom, an architect from York as a substantial improvement on the old hackney carriages. These two-wheel vehicles were fast, light enough to be pulled by a single horse (making the journey cheaper than travelling in a larger four-wheel coach) were agile enough to steer around horse-drawn vehicles in the notorious traffic jams of nineteenth-century London and had a low centre of gravity for safe cornering. Hansom's original design was modified by John Chapman and several others to improve its practicability, but retained Hansom's name.

These soon replaced the hackney carriage as a vehicle for hire. They quickly spread to other cities in the United Kingdom, as well as continental European cities, particularly Paris, Berlin, and St Petersburg. The cab was introduced to other British Empire cities and to the United States during the late 19th century, being most commonly used in New York City.

The first cab service in Toronto, "The City", was established in 1837 by Thornton Blackburn, an ex-slave whose escape when captured in Detroit was the impetus for the Blackburn Riots.

=== Modern taxicabs ===
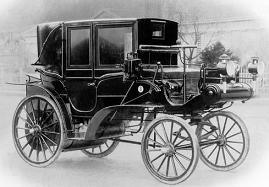
The 1897 Daimler Victoria was the first motorized-powered taxicab.

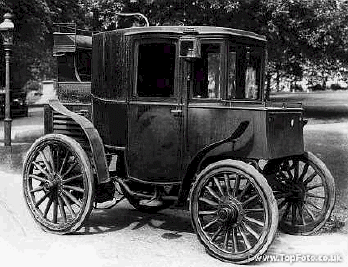
Electric Hansom, 1898-1899

The modern taximeter was invented and perfected by a trio of German inventors; Wilhelm Friedrich Nedler, Ferdinand Dencker and Friedrich Wilhelm Gustav Bruhn. The Daimler Victoria—the world's first motorized-powered taximeter-cab—was built by Gottlieb Daimler in 1897 and began operating in Stuttgart in June 1897. Gasoline-powered taxicabs began operating in Paris in 1899, in London in 1903, and in New York in 1907. The New York taxicabs were initially imported from France by Harry N. Allen, owner of the Allen-Kingston Motor Car Company. Their manufacturing took place at Bristol Engineering in Bristol, Connecticut where the first domestically produced Taxicabs were built in 1908, designed by Fred E. Moskovics who had worked at Daimler in the late 1890s. Albert F. Rockwell was the owner of Bristol and his wife suggested he paint his taxicabs yellow to maximise his vehicles' visibility. Moskovics was one of the organizers of the first Yellow Taxicab Company in New York.

Electric battery-powered taxis became available at the end of the 19th century. In London, Walter Bersey designed a fleet of such cabs and introduced them to the streets of London on 19 August 1897. They were soon nicknamed 'Hummingbirds' due to the idiosyncratic humming noise they made. In the same year in New York City, the Samuel's Electric Carriage and Wagon Company began running 12 electric hansom cabs. The company ran until 1898 with up to 62 cabs operating until it was reformed by its financiers to form the Electric Vehicle Company.

Taxicabs proliferated around the world in the early 20th century. The first major innovation after the invention of the taximeter occurred in the late 1940s, when two-way radios first appeared in taxicabs. Radios enabled taxicabs and dispatch offices to communicate and serve customers more efficiently than previous methods, such as using callboxes. The next major innovation occurred in the 1980s when computer assisted dispatching was first introduced.

=== As military and emergency transport ===
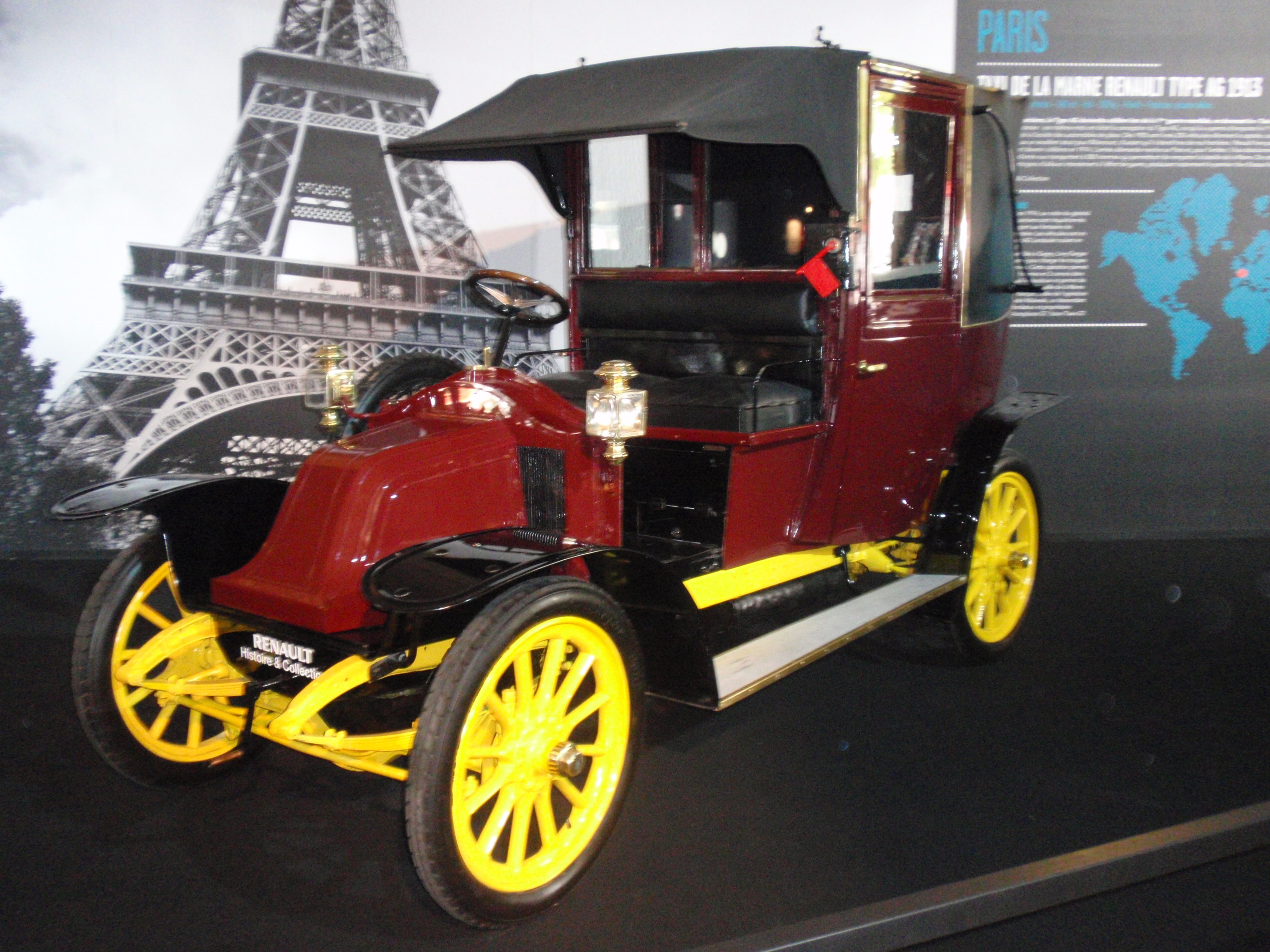
Paris taxis carried 6000 soldiers to the front during the First Battle of the Marne.

Paris taxis played a memorable part in the French victory at First Battle of the Marne in the First World War. On 7 September 1914, the Military Governor of Paris, Joseph Gallieni, gathered about six hundred taxicabs at Les Invalides in central Paris to carry soldiers to the front at Nanteuil-le Haudouin, fifty kilometers away. Within twenty-four hours about six thousand soldiers and officers were moved to the front. Each taxi carried five soldiers, four in the back and one next to the driver. Only the back lights of the taxis were lit; the drivers were instructed to follow the lights of the taxi ahead. The Germans, caught off guard, were pushed back by the French and British forces. Most of the taxis were demobilized on 8 September but some remained longer to carry the wounded and refugees. The taxis, following city regulations, dutifully ran their meters. The French treasury reimbursed the total fare of 70,012 francs. The military impact of the soldiers moved by taxi was small in the huge scale of the Battle of the Marne, but the effect on French morale was enormous; it became the symbol of the solidarity between the French army and citizens. It was also the first recorded large-scale use of motorized infantry in battle.

The Birmingham pub bombings on 21 November 1974, which killed 21 people and injured 182, presented emergency services with unprecedented peacetime demands. According to eyewitness accounts, the fire officer in charge, knowing the 40 ambulances he requested were unlikely to be available, requested the Taxi Owners Association to transport the injured to the nearby Birmingham Accident Hospital and Birmingham General Hospital.

== Vehicles ==
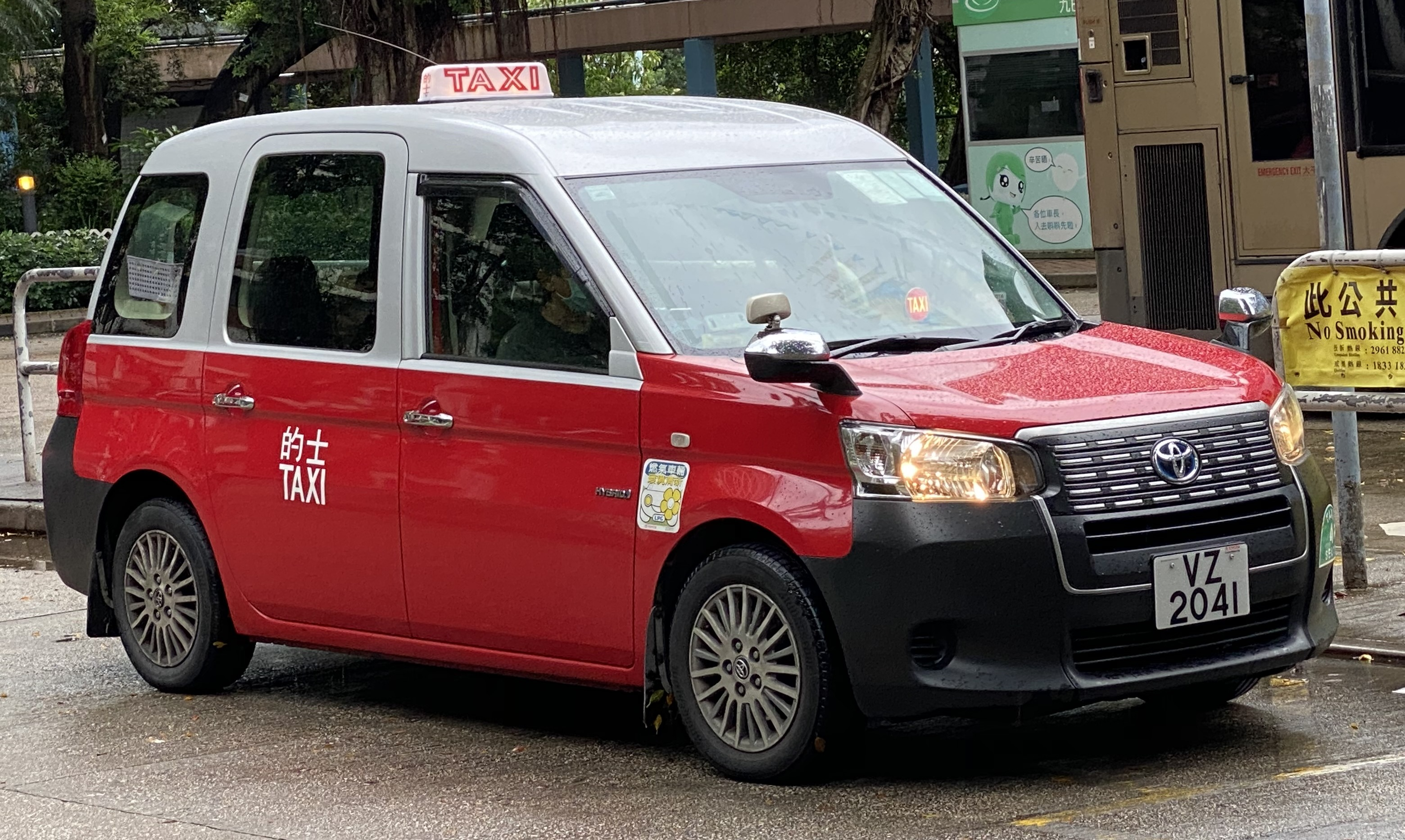
Toyota JPN Taxis in use in Hong Kong

Ford Crown Victoria Yellow Cab. These have been discontinued but remain one of the most successful taxicabs

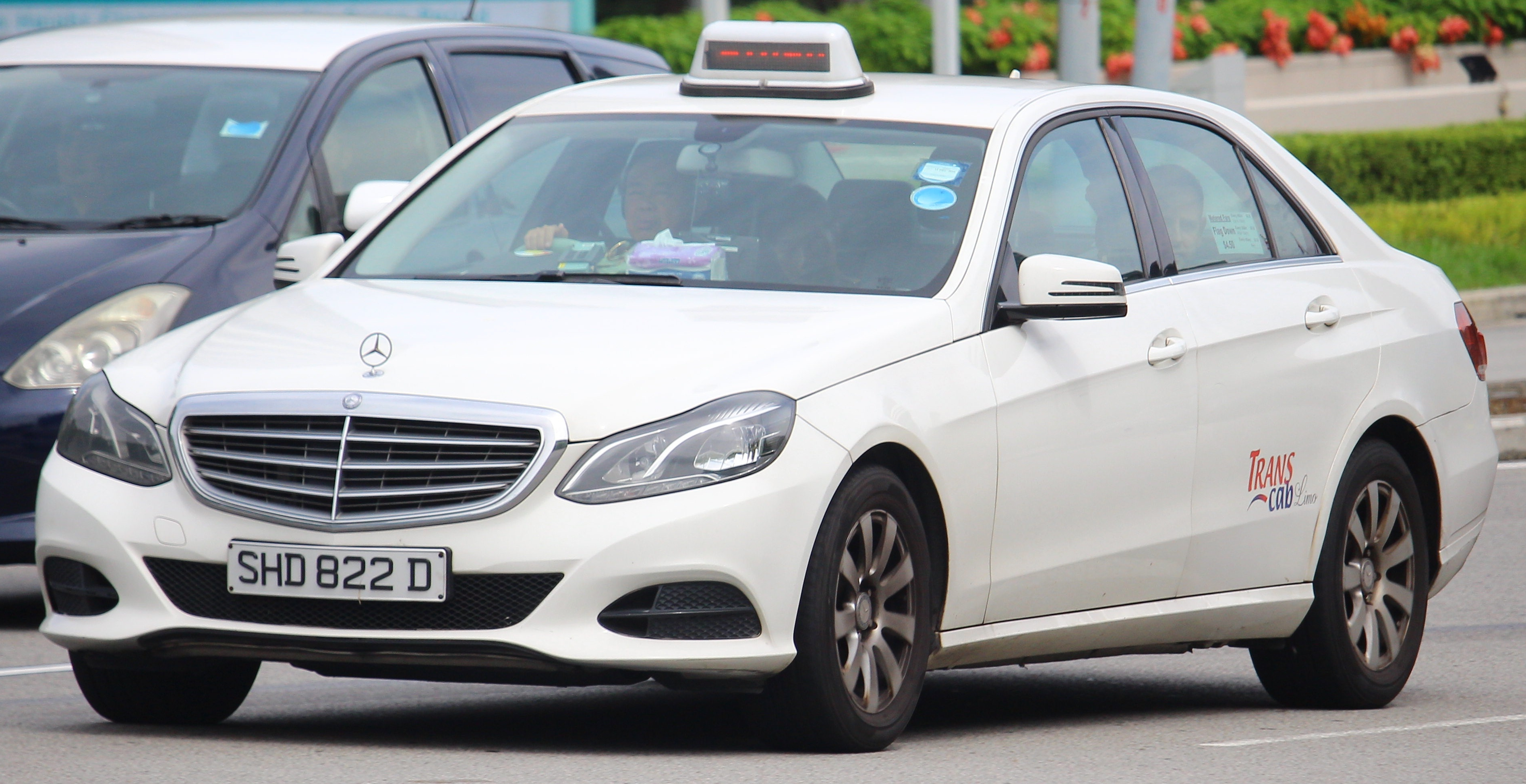
Mercedes-Benz has been a popular choice with taxicab operators due to their reliability. Pictured here is Singapore's TransCab LimoCab's Mercedes-Benz E 220 diesel

Taxi services are typically provided by automobiles, but in some countries, various human-powered vehicles (such as the rickshaw or pedicab), animal-powered vehicles (such as the Hansom cab), or even boats (such as water taxies or gondolas) are or have historically been used. In Western Europe, Bissau, and to an extent, Australia, it is not uncommon for expensive cars such as Mercedes-Benz to be the taxicab of choice. Often this decision is based upon the perceived reliability of, and warranty offered with, these vehicles. These taxi-service vehicles are almost always equipped with four-cylinder turbodiesel engines and relatively low levels of equipment, and are not considered luxury cars. This, however, has changed in countries such as Denmark, where tax regulation makes it profitable to sell the vehicles after a few years of service, which requires the cars to be well equipped and kept in good condition.

Cities like London and Tokyo have implemented specific regulations like London's Conditions of Fitness that dictate size, fuel efficiency, emissions, and accessibility standards far stricter than that for private vehicles. Much like the Checker cabs that were ubiquitous in New York City from the 1960s to the 1980s, the unique attributes of the city often make the vehicles built to fit those requirements ubiquitous to its livery fleets, and often becomes an iconic image of the city itself.

Although New York City's efforts to mandate both a hybrid and wheelchair-accessible vehicle have been largely unsuccessful, London and Tokyo's efforts have yielded unique vehicles such as the LEVC TX and Toyota JPN Taxi that meet and exceed modern emissions and accessibility requirements for the future, and plan to extend to other cities as older models get rotated out of the bigger cities and into smaller markets. Modifications of existing minivans such as the Mercedes Vito London Taxi and the Nissan NV200 have also been introduced as a stopgap measures to fill the need for alternative products, but have been largely rejected by customers.

=== Wheelchair-accessible taxicabs ===
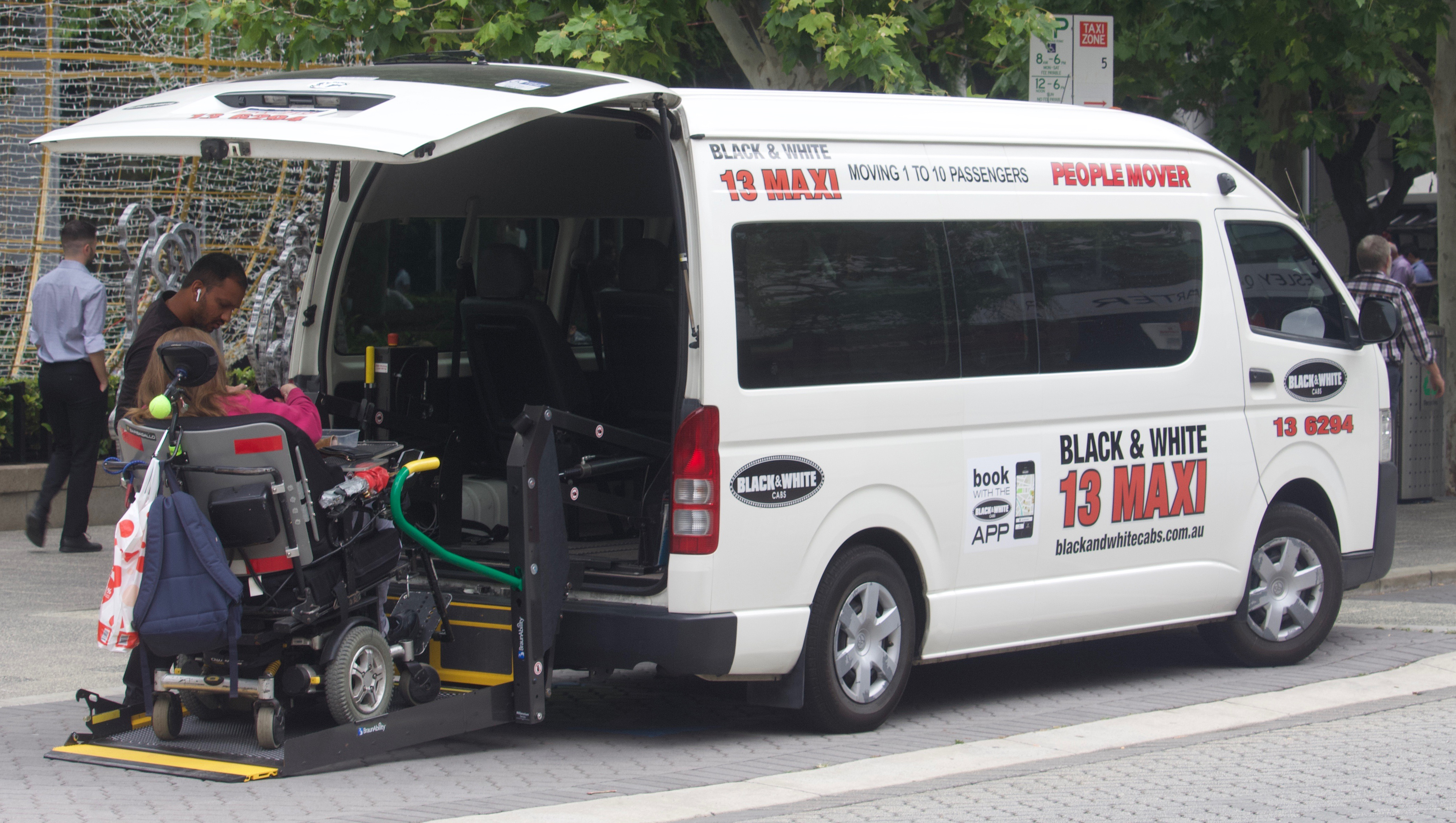
Wheelchair accessible maxicab, unloading a wheelchair-using passenger in Australia

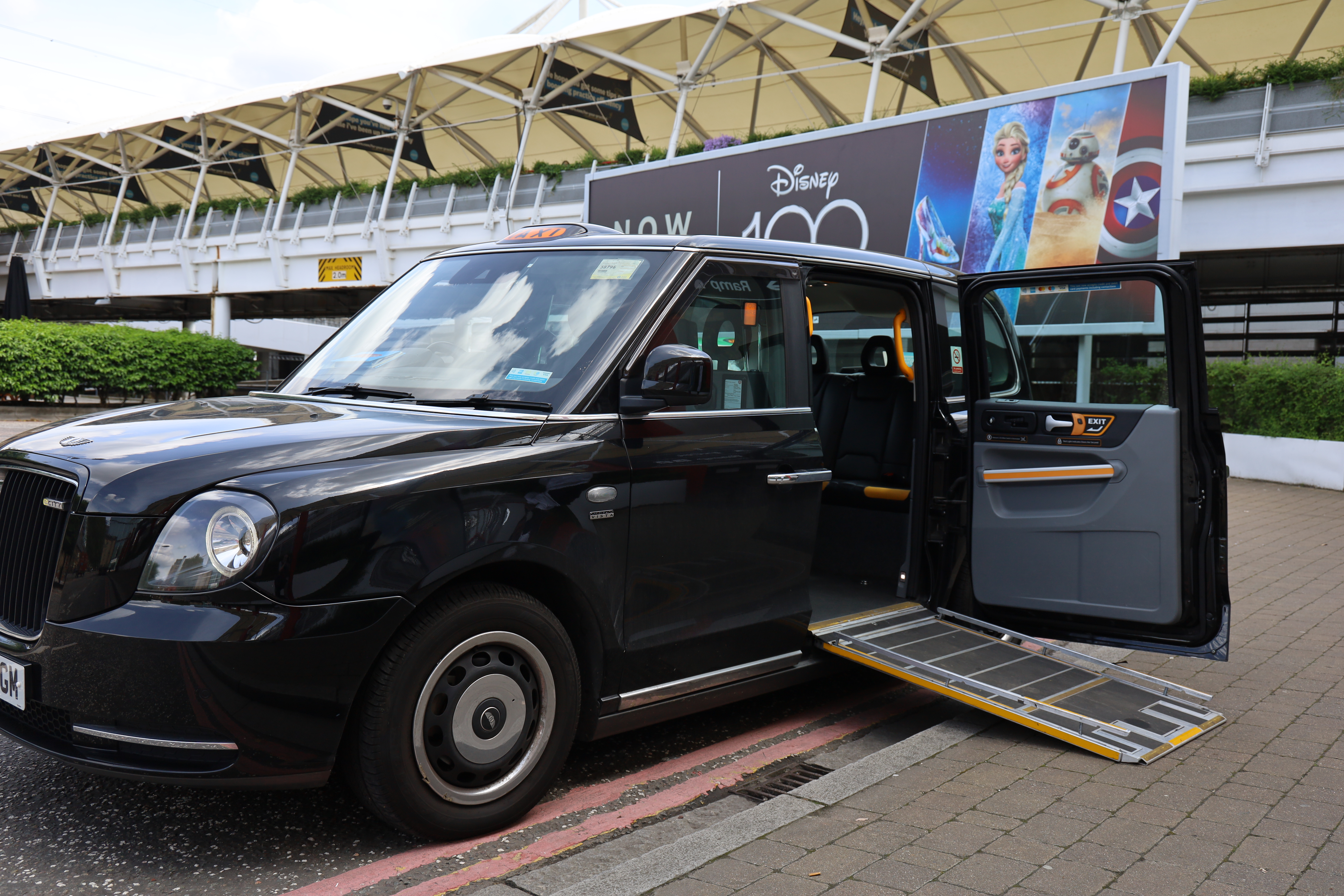
LEVC TX with wheelchair ramp in London

In recent years, some companies have been adding specially modified vehicles capable of transporting wheelchair-using passengers to their fleets. Such taxicabs are variously called accessible taxis, wheelchair- or wheelchair-accessible taxicabs, modified taxicabs, or "maxicabs".

Wheelchair taxicabs are most often specially modified vans or minivans. Wheelchair-using passengers are loaded, with the help of the driver, via a lift or, more commonly, a ramp, at the rear of the vehicle. However, this feature has led to concern among licensing authorities, who feel that the wheelchair passenger would not be able to easily exit the vehicle in the event of accident damage to the rear door. For this reason, the latest generation of accessible taxis features side loading with emergency egress possible from either of the two side doors as well as the rear. The wheelchair is secured using various systems, commonly including some type of belt and clip combination, or wheel locks. Some wheelchair taxicabs are capable of transporting only one wheelchair-using passenger at a time, and can usually accommodate four to six additional non-disabled passengers.

Wheelchair taxicabs are part of the regular fleet in most cases, and so are not reserved exclusively for the use of wheelchair users. They are often used by non-disabled people who need to transport luggage, small items of furniture, animals, and other items. Because of this, and since only a small percentage of the average fleet is modified, wheelchair users must often wait for significantly longer periods when calling for a cab, and flagging a modified taxicab on the street is much more difficult. London's taxis have been fully accessible since January 2000, with all taxis fitted with a pull-out or portable ramp.

=== Other ===
Taxicabs in less developed places can be a completely different experience, such as the antique French cars typically found in Cairo. However, starting in March 2006, newer modern taxicabs entered the service operated by various private companies. Taxicabs differ in other ways as well: London's black cabs have a large compartment beside the driver for storing bags, while many fleets of regular taxis also include wheelchair accessible taxicabs among their numbers (see above). Although taxicabs have traditionally been sedans, minivans, hatchbacks and even SUV taxicabs are becoming increasingly common. In many cities, limousines operate as well, usually in competition with taxicabs and at higher fares.

Growing concern for the environment has led to greater demand for more environmentally friendly methods of taxicab travel. On 20 April 2008, a "solar taxi tour" was launched that aimed to tour 15 countries in 18 months in a solar taxi that can reach speeds of 90 km/h with zero emissions; the aim of the tour was to spread awareness about environmental protection.

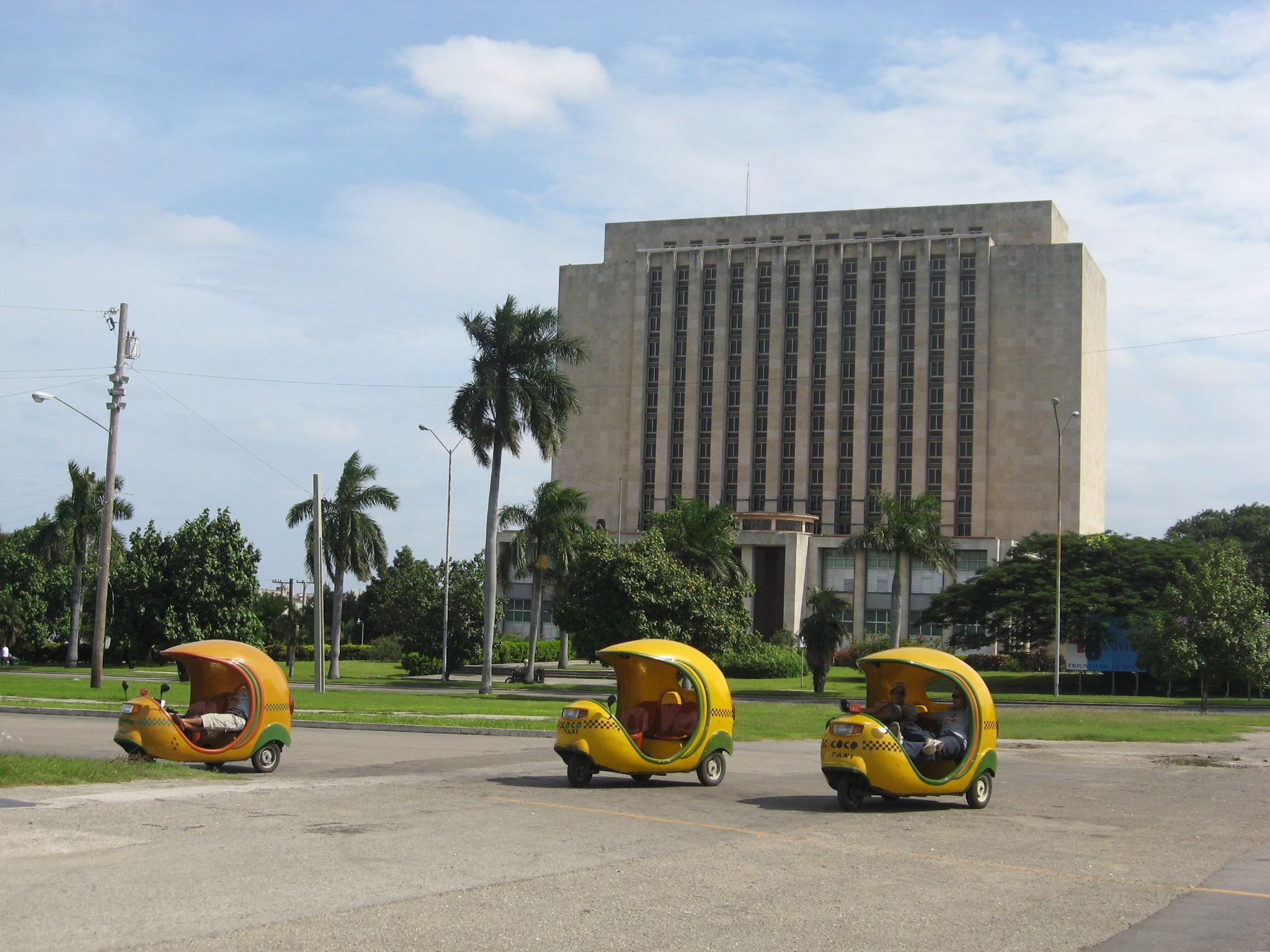
Three-wheeled Coco taxis in Havana, Cuba

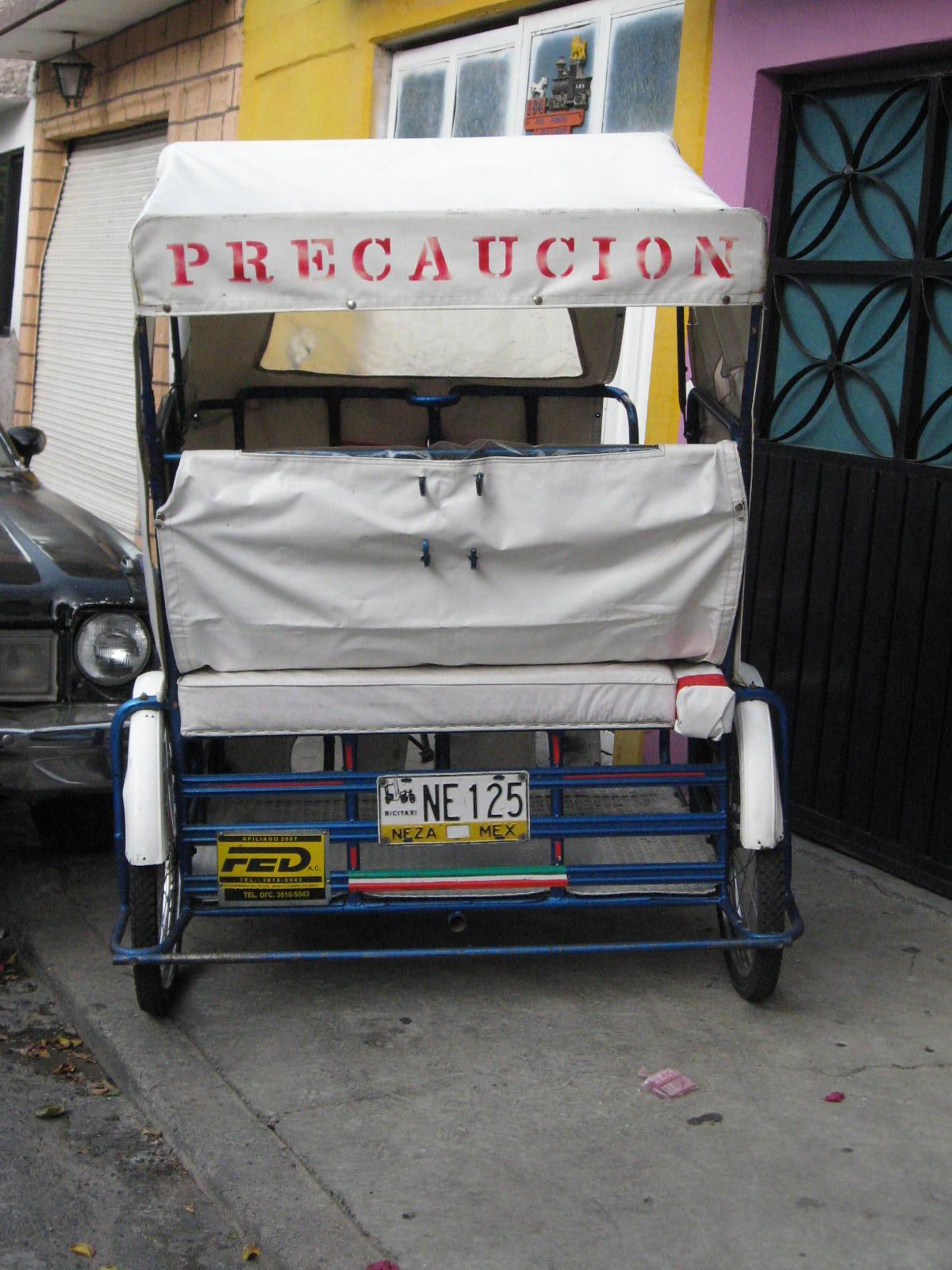
A "bicitaxi" (identified by its license plate) in Ciudad Nezahualcoyotl, Mexico

== Livery ==
Most taxi companies have some sort of livery on the vehicle, depending on the type of taxi (taxi, cab, private hire, chauffeur), country, region and operator.

== Hiring ==
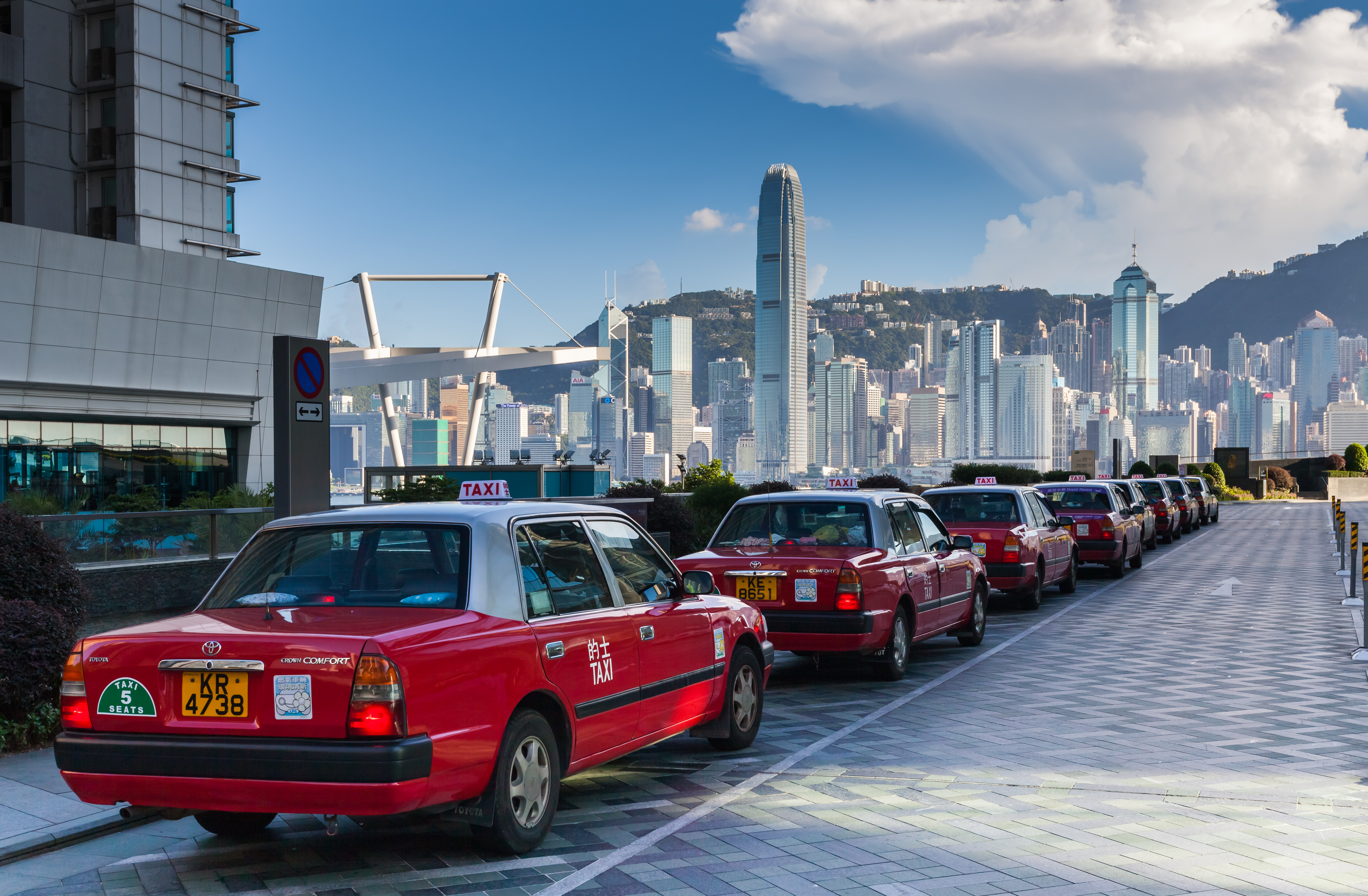
Toyota Crown Comfort taxicabs lined up in front of Kowloon Waterfront in Hong Kong

Most places allow a taxi to be "hailed" or "flagged" on the side of the street as it is approaching. Another option is a taxi stand (sometimes also called a "cab stand," "hack stand," "taxi rank," or "cab rank"). Taxi stands are usually located at airports, railway stations, major retail areas (malls), hotels and other places where a large number of passengers are likely to be found. In some places—Japan, for example—taxi stands are arranged according to the size of the taxis, so that large- and small-capacity cabs line up separately. The taxi at the front of the line is due (barring unusual circumstances) for the next fare.

Passengers also commonly call a central dispatch office for taxis. In some jurisdictions, private hire vehicles can only be hired from the dispatch office, and must be assigned each fare by the office by radio or phone. Picking up passengers off the street in these areas can lead to suspension or revocation of the driver's taxi license, or even prosecution.

Other areas may have a mix of the two systems, where drivers may respond to radio calls and also pick up street fares.

Passengers may also hire taxicabs via mobile apps. While not directly involving the call center, the taxis are still monitored by the dispatcher through GPS tracking. Many taxicab companies, including Gett, Easy Taxi, and GrabTaxi provide mobile apps.

=== Dispatching ===
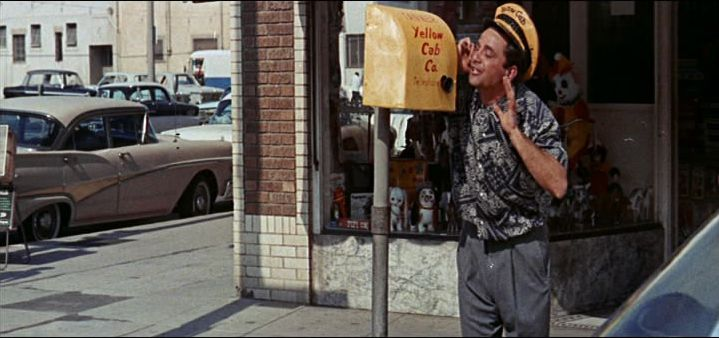
In this scene from It's a Mad, Mad, Mad, Mad World, a yellow cab driver, played by Peter Falk, contacts his dispatch through a callbox on the street. Two-way radio communication had not become a standard by the time the film was made in the early 1960s.

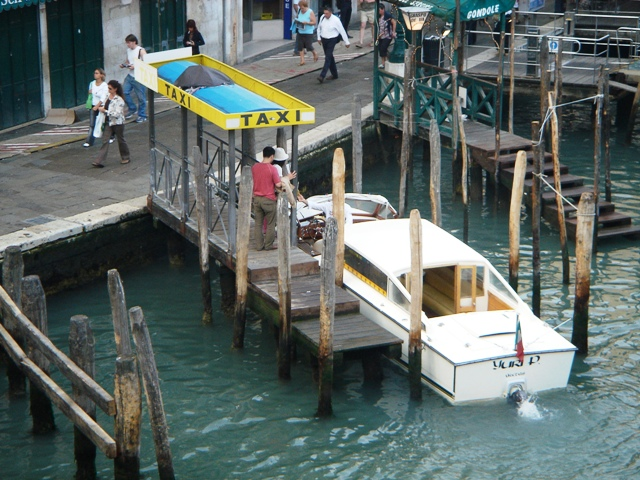
A taxi in Venice

The activity of taxi fleets is usually monitored and controlled by a central office, which provides dispatching, accounting, and human resources services to one or more taxi companies. Taxi owners and drivers usually communicate with the dispatch office through either a 2-way radio, telephone or a computer terminal (called a mobile data terminal). Before the innovation of radio dispatch in the 1950s, taxi drivers would use a callbox—a special telephone at a taxi stand—to contact the dispatch office.

When a customer calls for a taxi, a trip is dispatched by either radio or computer, via an in-vehicle mobile data terminal, to the most suitable cab. The most suitable cab may either be the one closest to the pick-up address (often determined by GPS coordinates nowadays) or the one that was the first to book into the "zone" surrounding the pickup address. Cabs are sometimes dispatched from their taxi stands; a call to "Top of the 2" means that the first cab in line at stand #2 is supposed to pick someone up.

In offices using radio dispatch, taxi locations are often tracked using magnetic pegs on a "board"—a metal sheet with an engraved map of taxi zones. In computerized dispatch, the status of taxis is tracked by the computer system.

Taxi frequencies are generally licensed in duplex pairs. One frequency is used for the dispatcher to talk to the cabs, and a second frequency is used to the cabs to talk back. This means that the drivers generally cannot talk to each other. Some cabs have a CB radio in addition to the company radio so they can speak to each other.

In the United States, there is a Taxicab Radio Service with pairs assigned for this purpose. A taxi company can also be licensed in the Business Radio Service. Business frequencies in the UHF range are also licensed in pairs to allow for repeaters, though taxi companies usually use the pair for duplex communications.

Taxi dispatch is evolving in connection to the telecom sector with the advent of smart-phones. In some countries such as Australia, Canada, Germany, the UK and USA, smartphone applications are emerging that connect taxi drivers directly with passengers for the purpose of dispatching taxi jobs, launching new battles for the marketing of such apps over the potential mass of Taxi users.

Taxi fares are set by the state and city where they are permitted to operate. The fare includes the 'drop', a set amount that is tallied for getting into the taxi plus the 'per kilometer' rate as has been set by the city. The taxi meters track time as well as distance in an average taxi fare.

=== Drivers and companies ===
In the United States, a nut is industry slang for the amount of money a driver has to pay upfront to lease a taxi for a specific period of time. Once that amount is collected in fare, the driver then begins to make a profit. A driver "on the nut" is trying to earn back the initial cost. This varies from city to city though, in Las Vegas, Nevada, all taxicabs are owned and operated by the companies and all drivers are employees (hence no initial cost and earn a percentage of each fare). So "on the nut" simply means to be next in a taxi stand to receive a passenger. Additionally, some cab companies are owned cooperatively, with profits shared through democratic governance.

== Regulatory compliance and training ==
=== Australia ===
Different states have different regulations for taxi driver registration and compliance:

- New South Wales: There is an annual taxi licence determination which sets the maximum number of taxis allowed in specified areas. To be eligible you must have a taxi licence which is available from ABLIS. The industry body is the NSW Taxi Council and it provides a pathway to becoming a taxi driver.
- Northern Territory: Apply for a Commercial Passenger Vehicle licence (H endorsement) and ID card.
- Queensland: Apply for a driver authorisation.
- South Australia: Apply for South Australian driver accreditation with the SA government then complete training with a registered training provider.
- Tasmania
- Victoria: Drivers apply to the Taxi Services Commission to get a driver accreditation
- Western Australia

=== New Zealand ===
New Zealand taxi drivers fall under the definition of a Small Passenger Service Vehicle driver. They must have a P (passenger) endorsement on their driver licence. Until 1 October 2017, all drivers wanting to obtain a P endorsement had to complete a P endorsement course, but that requirement was removed as a result of lobbying by Uber who had been flouting the law.

Drivers must comply with work-time rules and maintain a logbook, with the onus on training falling on companies and drivers since the P endorsement course was abandoned.

The New Zealand Taxi Federation is the national advocacy group for taxi companies within New Zealand.

== Navigation ==
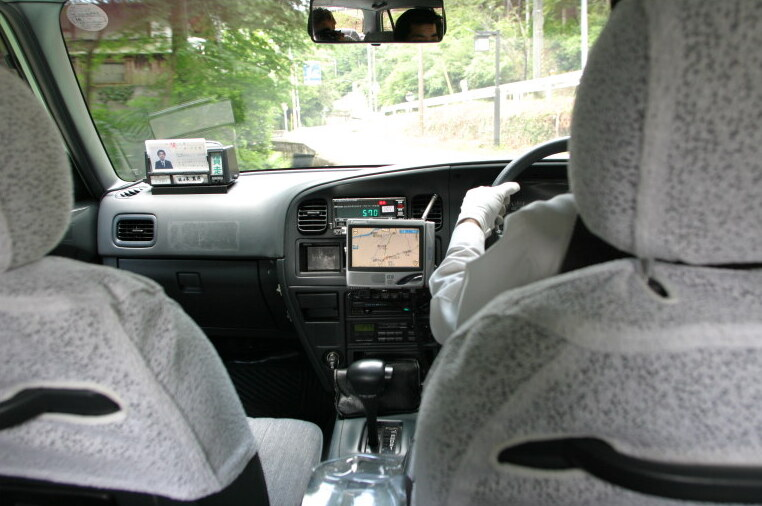
The inside of a Japanese taxicab in Kyoto with GPS navigation on board

Most experienced taxi drivers who have been working in the same city or region for a while would be expected to know the most important streets and places where their customers request to go. However, to aid the process of manual navigation and the taxi driver's memory (and the customer's as well at times) a cab driver is usually equipped with a detailed roadmap of the area in which they work. There is also an increasing use of GPS driven navigational systems in wealthier countries.

In London, despite the complex and haphazard road layout, such aids have only recently been employed by a small number of 'black cab' taxi (as opposed to minicab) drivers. Instead, they are required to undergo a demanding process of learning and testing called The Knowledge. This typically takes around three years and equips them with a detailed command of 25,000 streets within central London, major routes outside this area, and all buildings and other destinations to which passengers may ask to be taken.

== Environmental concerns ==
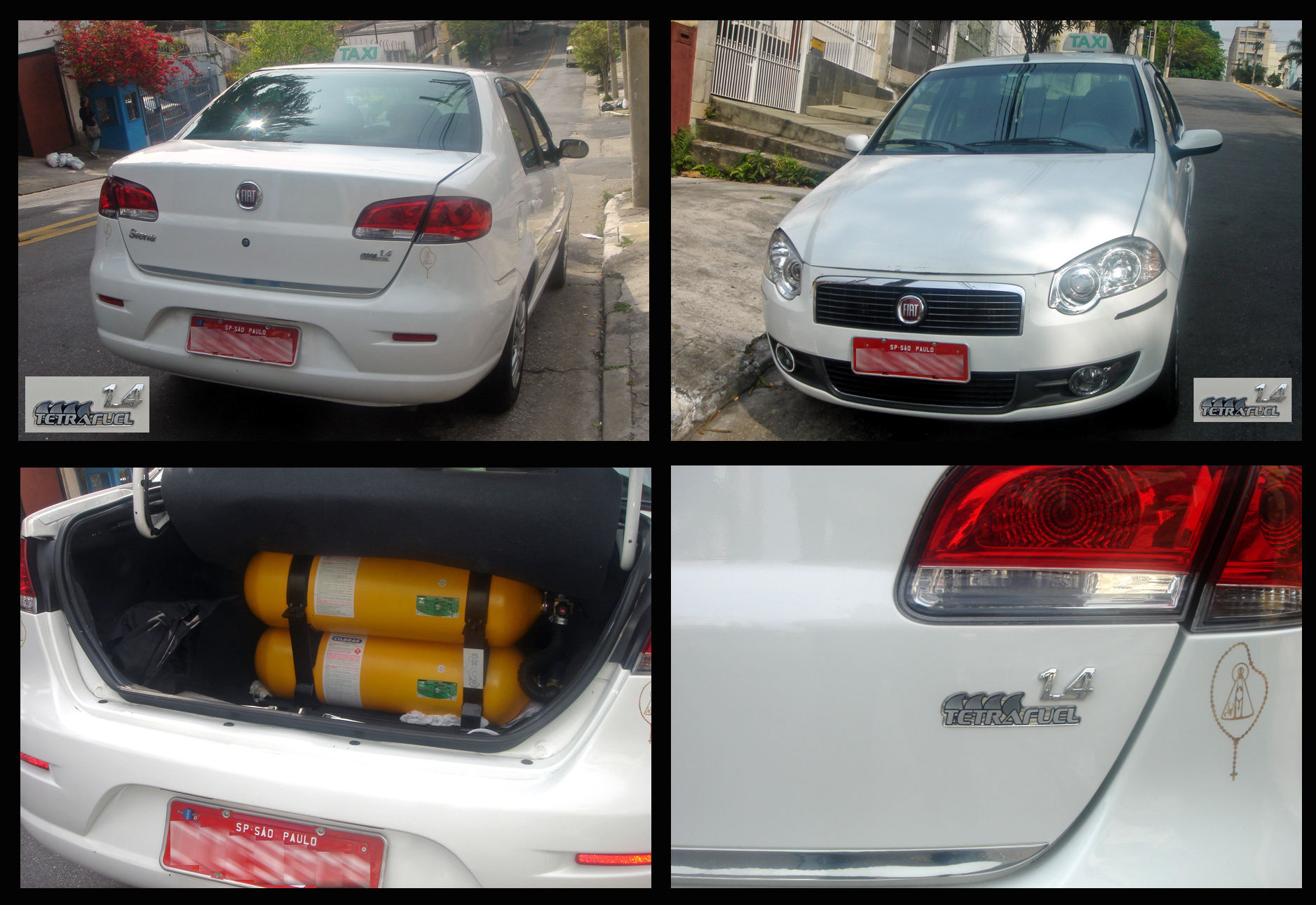
A Brazilian Fiat Siena Tetrafuel taxi in São Paulo runs as a flexible-fuel or as a bi-fuel with CNG

Taxicabs have been both criticized for creating pollution and also praised as an environmentally responsible alternative to private car use.

One study, published in the journal Atmospheric Environment in January 2006, showed that the level of pollution that Londoners are exposed to differs according to the mode of transport that they use. When in the back seat of a taxicab people were exposed the most, while walking exposing people to the lowest amount of pollution.

=== Alternative energy and propulsion ===
==== Gas and ethanol ====
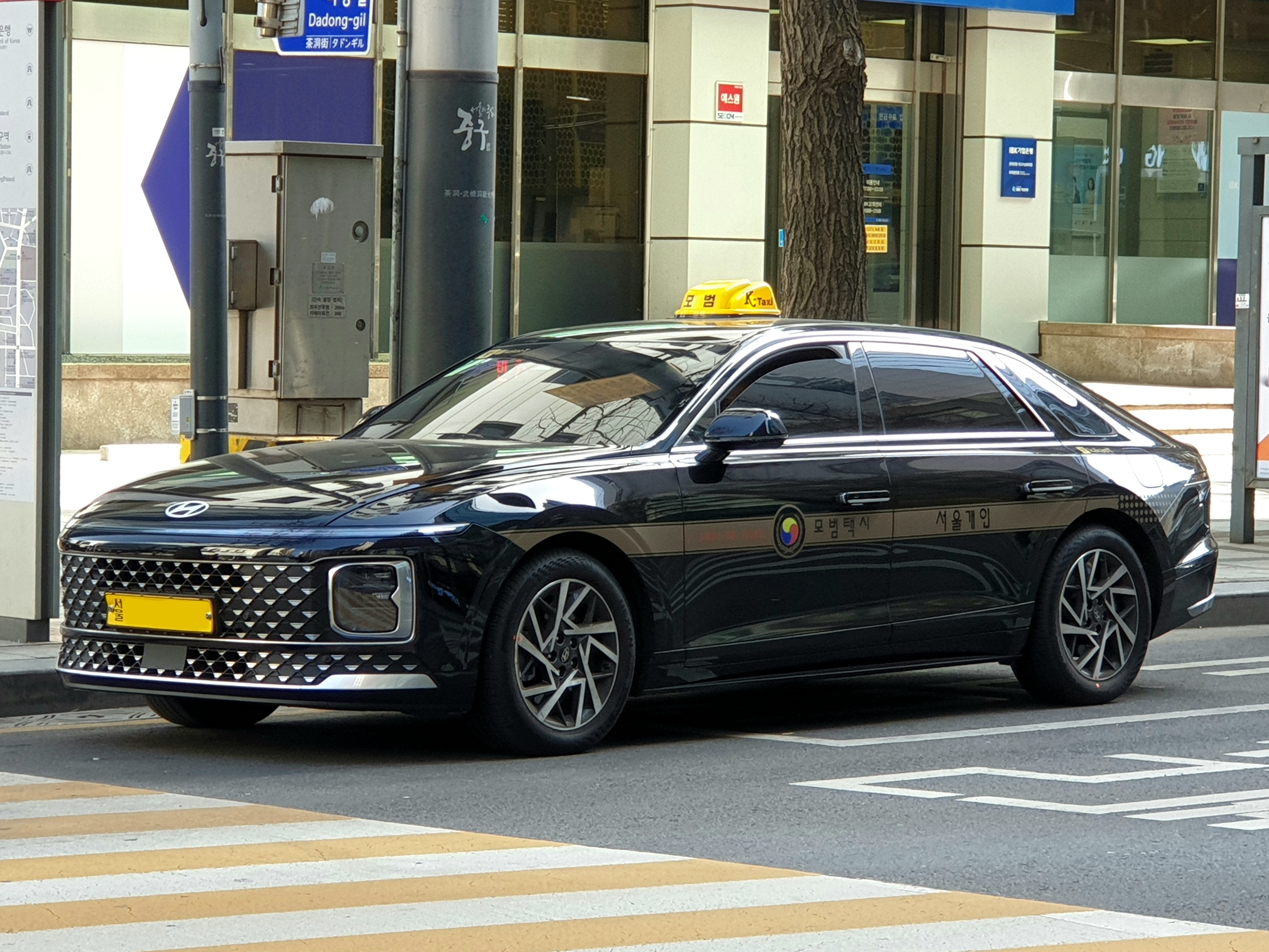
Hyundai Grandeur LPG taxi

In Australia, nearly all taxis run on LPG, as well as the growing fleet of hybrids. Malaysia and Singapore have many of their taxicabs running on compressed natural gas (CNG).

Argentina and the main cities of Brazil have large fleets of taxis running on natural gas. Many Brazilian taxis are flexible-fuel vehicles running on sugarcane ethanol, and some are equipped to run on either natural gas or as a flex-fuel. At least two Brazilian car makers sell these types of bi-fuel vehicles.

==== Hybrid electric ====
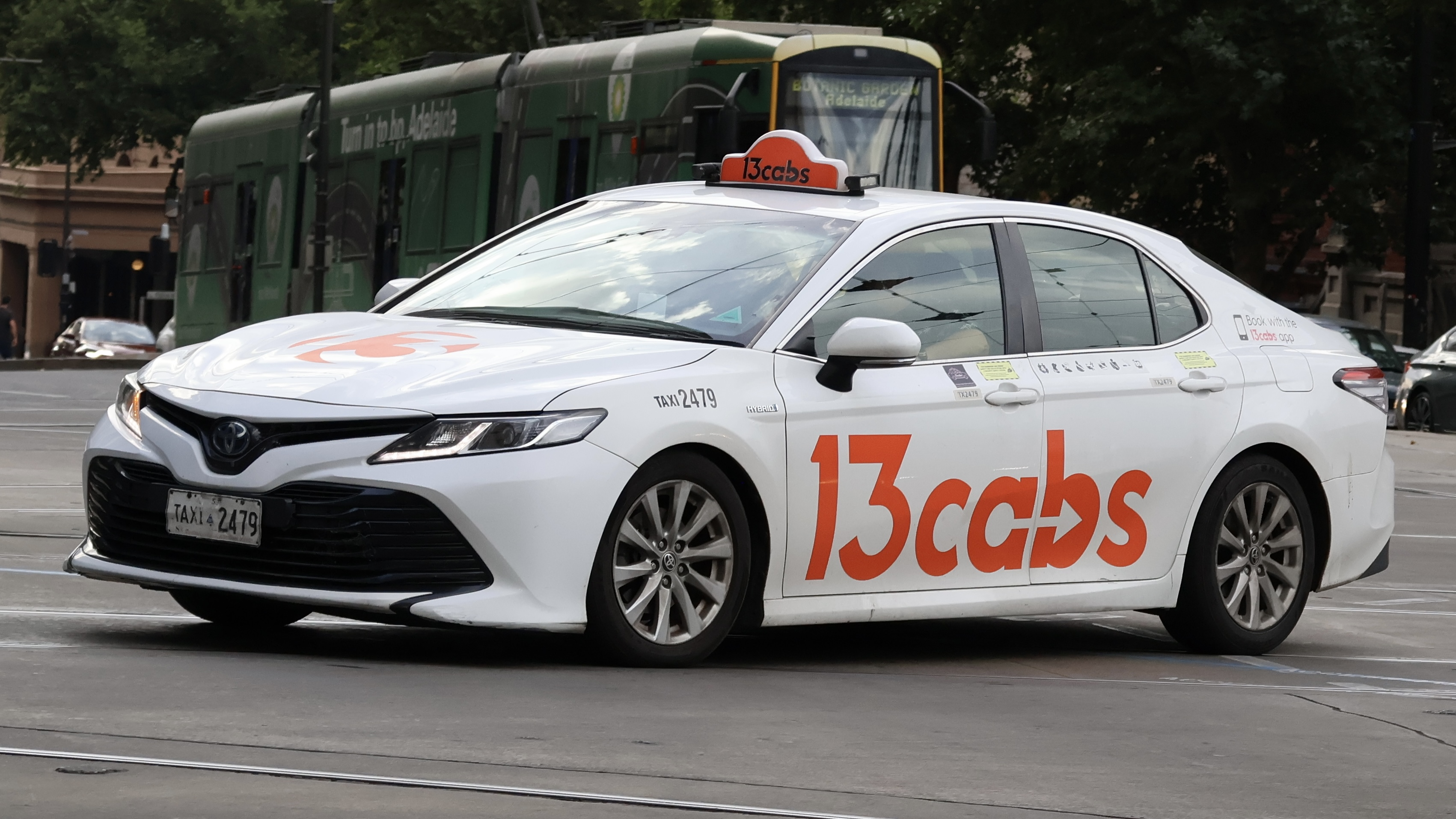
A Toyota Camry hybrid taxicab in Australia

In the United States, San Francisco became one of the first cities to introduce hybrids for taxi service in 2005, with a fleet of 15 Ford Escape Hybrids, and by 2009 the original Escape Hybrids were retired after 480,000 km (300,000 mi) per vehicle. In 2007 the city approved the Clean Air Taxi Grant Program in order to encourage cab companies to purchase alternative fuel vehicles, by providing incentives of US$2,000 per new alternative fuel vehicle on a first-come, first-served basis. Out of a total of 1,378 eligible vehicles (wheelchair-accessible taxi-vans are excluded) 788 are alternative fuel vehicles, representing 57% of the San Francisco's taxicab fleet by March 2010. Gasoline-electric hybrids accounted for 657 green taxis and compressed natural gas vehicles for 131.

As of mid-2009 New York City had 2,019 hybrid taxis, representing 15% of New York's 13,237 taxis in service, the most in any city in North America. At this time owners began retiring its original hybrid fleet after 480,000 and 560,000 km (300,000 and 350,000 mi) per vehicle. Two attempts by the Bloomberg Administration to implement policies to force the replacement of all New York's 13,000 taxis for hybrids by 2012 have been blocked by court rulings.

Chicago is following New York City's lead by proposing a mandate for Chicago's entire fleet of 6,700 taxicabs to become hybrid by 1 January 2014. As of 2008 Chicago's fleet had only 50 hybrid taxicabs. In 2008 Boston mandated that its entire taxi fleet must be converted to hybrids by 2015. Arlington, Virginia also has a small fleet of 85 environmentally friendly hybrid cabs introduced in early 2008. The green taxi expansion is part of a county campaign known as Fresh AIRE, or Arlington Initiative to Reduce Emissions, and included a new all-hybrid taxi company called EnviroCAB, which became the first all-hybrid taxicab fleet in the United States, and the first carbon-negative taxicab company in the world A similar all-hybrid taxicab company, Clean Air Cab, was launched in Phoenix, Arizona in October 2009.

Hybrid taxis are becoming more and more common in Canada, with all new taxis in British Columbia being hybrids, or other fuel efficient vehicles, such as the Toyota Prius or Toyota Corolla. Hybrids such as the Ford Escape Hybrid are slowly being added to the taxicab fleet in Mexico City.

Other cities where taxi service is available with hybrid vehicles include Tokyo, London, Sydney, Rome and Singapore. In 2009, South Korean manufacturer Hyundai introduced the Hyundai Elantra LPI Hybrid and Kia Forte LPI Hybrid, the first LPG-electric hybrids in the world, used for taxis in Seoul.

==== Electric ====
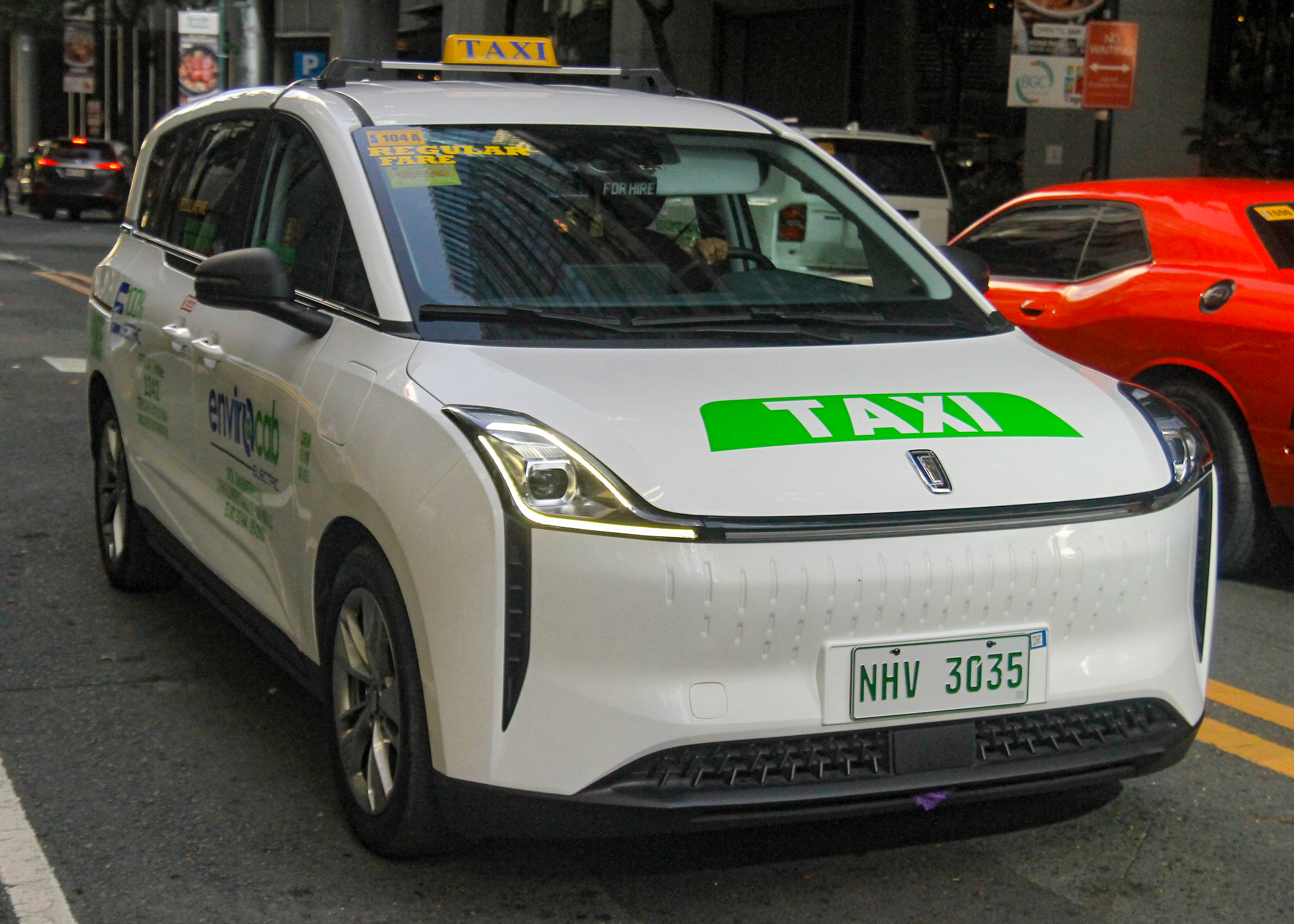
Battery Electric Vehicle (BEV) Bestune E05 taxi in The Philippines

In Japan, electric taxicabs are becoming increasingly popular. In 2009, battery-swap company Better Place teamed with the Japanese government to trial a fleet of electric taxis with the Better Place battery-swap system in Yokohama. In 2010, the taxi company Hinomaru Linousine Company launched two Mitsubishi i MiEV electric taxicabs in Tokyo. Both taxicabs had female drivers and were branded under ZeRO TAXI livery.

In 2010 Beijing, China introduced electric taxis. A trial run began in March 2010 with taxis being cheaper than their regular gasoline counterparts.

== International trade association ==
The Taxicab, Limousine & Paratransit Association (TLPA) was established in 1917 in the United States, and is a non-profit trade association of and for the private passenger transportation industry. Today its membership spans the globe and includes 1,100 taxicab companies, executive sedan and limousine services, airport shuttle fleets, non-emergency medical transportation companies, and paratransit services.

In April 2011, TLPA announced a nationwide "Transportation on Patrol" initiative. The TOP program gives local police departments the materials they need to train volunteer taxi drivers to be good witnesses and watch out for criminal behavior.

== Occupational hazards ==
Taxicab drivers are at risk for homicide at a far higher rate than the general working population in the United States (7.4 per 100,000 and 0.37 per 100,000, respectively). In efforts to reduce homicides, bulletproof partitions were introduced in many taxicabs in the 1990s, and in the 21st century, security cameras were added to many taxicabs. Security cameras have been shown to be more effective when implemented by cities and not taxicab companies. Cab drivers also work together to protect one another both from physical threats and passengers who refuse to pay.

Also, in some countries, it is reported that taxi drivers involve in more unsafe driving behaviors. Taxi drivers' feelings about their occupation, including traffic chaos, social prestige, economic pressure, and job satisfaction, may impact on the subsequent driving behaviors.

== Regulation ==
=== Support of deregulation ===
Supporters of taxicab deregulation may argue that deregulation causes the following benefits:

- Lower prices, because more taxis are competing on the market;
- Lower operating costs, incentivized by the competition;
- The competition adds quality and the pressure to enhance one's reputation;
- New innovations such as shared-ride markets and special services for disabled people, new market niches;
- The demand for taxi services increases, as the prices fall and the quality improves.
- Cities save money, as they do not have to plan and enforce regulation.

However, there appears to be a consensus that taxi deregulation has been less impressive than advocates had hoped. Possible reasons include overestimation of what deregulation could deliver and insufficiently thorough deregulation Some also emphasize that the strong cab-driver subculture, itself, ("The Last American Cowboys"), provides its own form of informal regulation.

Deregulation advocates may claim that the taxi service level increases most in the poorest sections of the city. The effect is highest in peak hours and bad weather, when the demand is highest.

Deregulation advocates also may claim that, in a deregulated environment black market taxis become legal, possibly eliminating their problems.

In nearly all deregulating cities the number of taxis increased, more people were employed as drivers, and deregulation advocates claim needs were better satisfied.

Existing taxi companies may try to limit competition by potential new entrants. For example, in New York City the monopoly advantage for taxi license holders was $590 million in the early 1980s. The city has 1,400 fewer licenses than in 1937. Proponents of deregulation argue that the main losers are the car-less poor and disabled people. Taxi owners form a strong lobby network that marginalizes drivers and taxi users. It also pays local government officials to uphold taxi regulation. The regulators usually do not wish to rise against the taxi-owner lobby. The politicians do not want taxi drivers to have a negative opinion of them.

Taxi deregulation proponents claims that immigrants and other poor minorities suffer most from taxi regulation, because the work requires relatively little education. Regulation makes entrance to the taxi business particularly difficult for them. People who are elderly, disabled, housewives and poor use taxis more often than others.

According to Moore and Rose, it is better to address potential problems of deregulation directly instead of regulating the number of taxi licences. For example, if the regulators want to increase safety, they should make safety statutes or publish a public list of safe taxi operators.

Proponents of deregulation also claim that if officials want to regulate prices they should standardize the measures rather than command prices. For example, they may require that any distance tariffs are set for the first 1/5 miles and then for every subsequent 1/3 miles, to make it easier to compare the prices of different taxis. They should not prohibit other pricing than distance pricing. Deregulation advocates claim that regulators only have a very limited information on the market.

Black market taxis often have problems with safety, poor customer service, and fares. This situation is made worse because customer who patronize such taxis cannot complain to the police or media. However, proponent of taxi deregulation argue that when these illegal taxi operations become legalized, their behavior will improve and complaints to officials about these formerly illegal taxi operations would be allowed.

Taxi companies claim that deregulation may lead to an unstable taxi market. However, one pro-deregulation study by Kitch, Isaacson and Kasper claims that the previous argument is a myth because it ignores the U.S. free taxi competition up to 1929.

==== Airport taxis as a special case ====
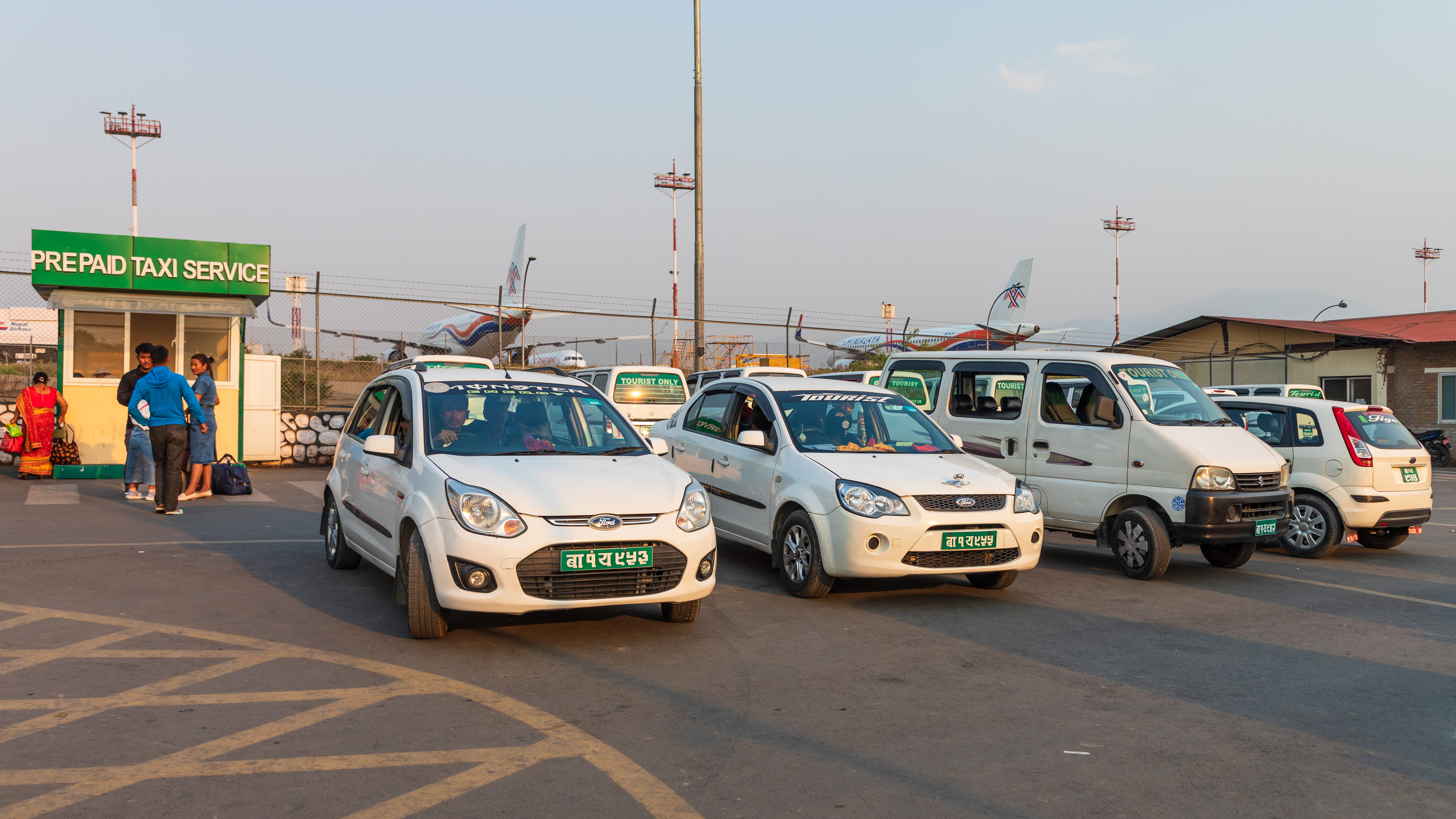
Prepaid airport taxis

Some deregulation proponents are less opposed to airport taxi regulation than to regulation of other taxi services. They argue that if an airport regulates prices for taxis in its taxi queues, such regulation has fewer disadvantages than citywide regulation. An airport may determine prices or organize different queues for taxi services of different qualities and prices. It can be argued whether rules set by the owner of an airport are regulation or just a business model.

==== Partial deregulation as a failure ====
Proponents of deregulation argue that partial deregulation is the cause of many cases of deregulation failing to achieve desirable results in United States cities. Many U.S. cities retained regulations on prices and services while allowing for free entrance to taxi business. Deregulation advocates argue that this prevented market mechanisms from solving information problems because new entrants have found it difficult to win new customers using new services or cheap prices. Also, ride-sharing has often been prohibited.

Often officials have also prohibited pricing that would have made short rides in sparsely populated areas profitable. Thus drivers have refused to take such customers. Therefore, partial deregulation is not always enough to enhance the situation. One study claims that deregulation was applied to a too small area.

In the taxi regulation report by U.S. FTC it was concluded that there are not grounds for limiting the number of taxi companies and cars. These limitations cause a disproportionate burden on low income people. It is better to increase the pay for unprofitable areas than to force the taxis to serve these areas.

According to the report, the experience on free entry and price competition are mainly positive: prices have fallen, waiting times were shortened, the market shares of the biggest companies have fallen, and city councils have saved time from licensing and fare setting. However, the airports should either set their own price ceilings or allow for price competition by altering the queue system.

=== Opposition to deregulation ===
Opponents of taxi deregulation argue that deregulation will result in high taxi driver turnover rates which may cause the number of less-qualified taxi drivers to increase, dishonest business practices such as price gouging (especially on airport routes) and circuitous routing, and poor customer service.

A Connecticut General Assembly report argues that deregulation fails to cause price decreases because taxi passengers typically do not price comparison shop when searching for taxicabs, and that fares usually increased with deregulation because the higher supply of taxis caused drivers' earning potential to decrease. This report claims that deregulation resulted in dramatically increased taxi supply, especially at already overserved airport locations, fare increases in every city, and an increase in short-trip refusals by taxicab drivers.

This report argues that deregulation has led to undesirable results in several American cities. Seattle deregulated taxis in 1980, resulting in a high supply of taxicabs, variable rates, price gouging, short-haul refusals, poor treatment of passengers. As a result, Seattle re-regulated in 1984, reinstating a restriction on taxicab licenses and fare controls. In St. Louis, deregulation produced a 35% rise in taxi fares, and taxicab drivers complained of waiting hours at airports for customers at taxicab stands. Taxicab companies claimed they increased fares in order to make up for lost competition resulting from the increased supply of taxis. As a result, the St. Louis City Council froze new taxicab licenses in 2002.

A study of the deregulation of taxis in Sweden in 1991 showed that the taxicab supply increased, but average fares also increased in almost all cases. Specifically, average fares per hour increased for all trips. Average fares also increased for fares calculated by distance (per kilometer) in almost every category studied – for all customer-paid trips in municipalities of all 3 sizes (small, medium, and large) and increased for municipality-paid trips in small and large municipalities; fares only decreased for municipality-paid trips in medium-sized municipalities that were calculated per kilometer. Deregulation also resulted in decreased taxicab productivity and decreased taxi-company revenues. This study concluded that deregulation resulted in increased fares especially in rural areas and the authors argued that the increased fares were due to low taxi company revenues after deregulation.

Taxi companies claim that deregulation would cause problems, raise prices and lower service level on certain hours or in certain places.

The medallion system has been defended by some experts. They argue that the medallion system is similar to a brand-name capital asset and enforces quality of service because quality service results in higher ridership, thus increasing the value of owning the medallion. They argue that issuing new medallions would decrease the medallion value and thus the incentive for the medallion owner to provide quality service or comply with city regulations. They also argue that the medallion may be preferable to alternate systems of regulation (such as fines, required bonds with seizures of interest payments on those bonds for violations, or licensing of all would-be taxis with revocation of that license for violations) because fines are difficult to collect, license revocation may not be a sufficient deterrent for profitable violations such as price cheating, and because using penalties on bond interest payments give regulators an incentive to impose penalties to collect revenue (rather than for legitimate violations). Medallions do not earn interest and thus inappropriate seizures of interest by regulators is not possible.

=== Results of deregulation in specific localities ===
The results of taxi deregulation in specific cities has varied widely.

A study of taxi deregulation in nine United States cities found that the number of taxi firms increased, but large incumbent firms continued to dominate all but one of the nine cities. The taxi prices did not fall in real terms, but increased in every city studied. Turnover was concentrated among small operators (usually one-cab operators); little turnover occurred among medium and large new firms and no exit by a large incumbent firm occurred since deregulation. Productivity decreased by at least one-third in all four cities for which sufficient data was obtainable; the authors argued that decreases of this magnitude in productivity have serious economic consequences for taxi drivers, by shifting the industry from employee drivers to lease drivers and causing the average taxi driver to earn a lower income. Innovation in service did not occur in the deregulated cities because such innovations (especially shared-ride service) were doubted by taxi operators to be justified by demand and because the operators viewed that they would cause a net decrease in revenue. Discounts were offered in certain deregulated cities; however, these discounts were small (10% typically) and were also offered in some regulated cities. The study found a lack of service innovation and little change in level of service despite the increased number of taxicabs.

In Japan, taxi deregulation resulted in modest decreases in taxi fares (primarily among long-distance trips); however, Japanese taxi fares are still very high (still the highest in the world). Also, taxi driver incomes decreased, and the earnings of taxi companies also decreased substantially. Deregulation failed to increase taxicab ridership enough to compensate taxi companies for those losses. The burden of deregulation fell disproportionately on taxi drivers because taxi companies increased the number of taxis rented to drivers (to make more money from rental fees), which resulted in stiff competition among drivers, decreasing their earnings. Transportation professor Seiji Abe of Kansai University considered deregulation to be a failure in the Japanese taxi industry (despite what he considers success in other Japanese industries).

In the Netherlands, taxi deregulation in 2000 failed to reach policy objectives of strengthening the role of the taxi in the overall Dutch transport system. Instead, the deregulation resulted in unanticipated fare increases (not decreases) in large cities, and bad driver behavior became a serious problem. Local authorities had lost their say in the market due to the deregulation, and thus were unable to correct these problems.

In South Africa, taxi deregulation has resulted in the emergence of taxi cartels which carry out acts of gun violence against rival cartels in attempts to monopolize desirable routes. In South Africa, taxis were deregulated in 1987, resulting in fierce competition among new drivers, who then organized into rival cartels in the absence of government regulation, and which used violence and gangland tactics to protect and expand their territories. These "taxi wars" have resulted in between 120 and 330 deaths annually since deregulation. These taxi cartels have engaged in anti competitive price-fixing.

In New Zealand taxi deregulation increased the supply of taxi services and initially decreased the prices remarkably in big cities, whereas the effects in smaller cities were small.

In Ireland, taxi deregulation decreased waiting times so much that the liberalization became very popular among the public. The number of companies was increased and the quality of cars and drives did not fall. Some have argued that the regulation should be completely abolished, not just cut down. Minister Alan Kelly held a review of Ireland's taxi industry after Ireland's national broadcaster RTÉ broadcast an investigation into the taxi industry 10 years after deregulation.

In Finland taxi fares rose 13% after 2018 deregulation.

== See also ==
- Taxis by country
- Air taxi: aircraft
- Carry On Cabby film
- Illegal taxi operation
- Pet taxi
- Rickshaw
- Robotaxi
- Taxicab number
- Transportation network company
- Vehicle for hire
- Zémidjan, a type of taxi found in Benin.

== Bibliography ==
- Fierro, Alfred (1996). Histoire et dictionnaire de Paris. Robert Laffont. ISBN 2-221-07862-4.
- Dictionnaire historique de Paris. La Pochothèque. 2013. ISBN 978-2-253-13140-3.
