= Computer-aided call handling =

Computer aided call handling is a methodology for managing calls to service providers, such as emergency services, through the use of computer based algorithms in order to make consistent and objective decisions on action to be taken. The computer software can provide scripting, prompts or interactive questioning to assist the call handler in gathering information.

The algorithms in the software will depend on the requirements of the service provider, the resources they have available, and the information that may be useful to resources dispatched or assigned to the call. The output is likely to be a prioritised list of tasks for action, where the action could be passing to another remote service (such as a telephony centre), dispatching a physical resource (such as an ambulance, police car or recovery truck) or closing the call without action. The advantage in using a computer based system is objectivity in decisions made, meaning a consistent service delivery.

Call handling software can be linked to computer aided dispatch in order that this process is fully integrated, and information from the call handling software is passed directly to dispatch software where appropriate. This could also mean dispatching services which are not part of the organisation using the call handling software, such as an ambulance control centre automatically dispatching police to a violent incident, without the requirement to involve a further operator.
