= Mobile data terminal =

Vehicle device used to communicate with a dispatcher

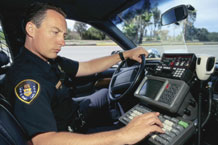
A police officer accessing a mobile data terminal in a police car

A mobile data terminal (MDT) or mobile digital computer (MDC) is a computerized device used in emergency services, public transport, taxicabs, package delivery, roadside assistance, and logistics, among other fields, to communicate with a central dispatcher. They are also used to display mapping and information relevant to the tasks and actions performed by the vehicle such as Computer-aided design (CAD) drawings, diagrams and safety information.

Mobile data terminals feature a screen on which to view information and a keyboard or keypad for entering information, and may be connected to various peripheral devices. Standard peripherals include two-way radios and taximeters, both of which predate computer-aided dispatching. MDTs may be simple display and keypad units, intended to be connected to a separate black-box or AVL (see below) computer. While MDTs were originally thin clients, most have been replaced with fully functional PC hardware, known as MDCs (Mobile Digital Computers). While the MDC term is more correct, MDT is still widely used. Other common terms include MVC (Motor Vehicle Computer) and names of manufacturers such as iMobile or KDT.

== History ==
During the late 1960s, a surge in crime in the United States spurred the police community to modernize tactics. This led to a push for the adoption of computers by police departments, which would turn out to be a slow process. Some police officials attributed this to a few specific factors including, "the complexities of the new technology, the cautious, conservative nature of many police officers, and citizens' 'fear of Big Brother'. Lack of funds for computer training and equipment maintenance also played a part."

The earliest MDTs began showing up in police cars in the early 1970s. In 1973, the Cleveland Police Department introduced the specialized AMC Ambassador Impact task force police car equipped with a Kustom electronics MDT, capable of checking for license numbers or owner information, stolen vehicles, verifying wanted persons, and exchange private messages between vehicles. These would be the first police computers to be used in the State of Ohio.

Motorola would become a major provider of MDTs by the late 1970s. One of these earliest models was the D-1118, which would be succeeded by the MDT-9100 in the 1980s. By the early 1990s, police departments began to increasingly use computers for more advanced activities, as opposed to routine patrol tasks that accounted for the typical modicum of usage. According to Bureau of Justice statistics, there was a considerable uptake in adoption between 1990 and 1993, with one half of departments using computers compared to two thirds by 1993. Police departments with computers staffed approximately 95 percent of local officers by 1993.

These early police computers, including those developed by Motorola, became notorious for security issues due to the relatively basic data protocol used. Despite Motorola's marketed appearance of secure communications, it was soon discovered that this conspicuous “special code” for bit interleaving and data stream obfuscation was nothing more than simple ASCII. This approach taken by Motorola would have been considered security by obscurity. In the 1990s, hackers deciphered the properties of the protocol and PC programs soon began appearing on the market allowing the general public to monitor police communications - an issue that lasted well into the 2000s.

== Technology ==
In the earlier days of computer-aided dispatching (CAD), many MDT's were custom devices, used with specialized point to point radios, particularly in applications such as police dispatching. While applications like taxi and package delivery often still use custom designed terminals, the majority of CAD systems have switched to ruggedized laptops and Wide-Area Wireless IP communications, utilizing the Internet or private IP networks connected to and over it.

For industrial applications such as commercial trucking, GIS, agriculture, mobile asset management, and other industries, custom electronic hardware is still preferred. Custom terminals use I/O interfaces that connect directly to industry-specific equipment. They are usually environmentally hardened packages with power supply protection and robust memory file systems that greatly improve reliability and task efficiency. MDT solutions that are based on ruggedized consumer products or consumer available software will typically not have the life cycle duration expected in industrial applications, over five years.

== Typical features ==
- 9 VDC to 36 VDC input power.
- May be tablet convertible.
- Serial ports to connect to a satellite or terrestrial radio transceiver.
- Digital I/O to monitor external events.
- Removable medial or I/O port of retrieving data or upgrading software.
- Wide operating temperature of 14 °F (−10 °C) to 140 °F (60 °C) or greater.
- Water and dust resistance rated.
- Drop tested and rated.
- Sealed against dust and liquid.
- Connections to industry specific equipment, such as J1708 data bus for commercial truck applications.
- Display technology specific to viewing conditions for the intended industry (LCD, TFT LCD, Vacuum fluorescent display, CSTN).
- Integrated uninterruptible power supply, which will ride through electrical brown-outs typical in vehicle installations.
- 802.11 transceiver (depending on target application), possibly with external antenna connection.
- Cellular transceiver providing an Internet connection.

A related device classification, specific to the transportation industry, is called automatic vehicle location (AVL). Mobile data terminals are often used in conjunction with a "black box" that contains a GPS receiver, cell phone transceiver, other radio devices, or interfaces to industry-specific equipment. AVL devices may be simple stand-alone modems or may include operating systems with application space for the system integrator.

== Use in vehicle ==
MDTs are most commonly associated with in-vehicle use. This requires the MDT to be anchored to the vehicle for driver safety, device security, and user ergonomics. Mounts are designed for attaching MDTs to mobile workspaces into, most notably: automobiles, forklifts, boats, and planes. MDTs generally require specific installation protocols to be followed for proper ergonomics, power and communications functionality. MDT installation companies such as PCN Strategies, USAT Corp. and TouchStar Technologies UK, specialize in designing the mount design, assembling the proper parts, and installing them in a safe and consistent manner away from airbags, vehicle HVAC controls, and driver controls. Frequent installations will include a WAN modem, power conditioning equipment, and a WAN, WLAN, and GPS antenna mounted external to the vehicle.

== Use in UK ambulance services ==
The mobile data terminal (MDT) allows for routing, receiving and display of data between control room and operational vehicles allowing ambulance crews to respond quickly and appropriately to calls. This allows for up to date CAD information to be dispatched instantly to the receiving ambulance saving valuable time in receiving critical information about the incident. Its mapping software allows for accurate location of the incident to be transmitted directly to the ambulance as well as plotting the quickest route to the scene. This software also allows for the control room to track all operational vehicles to identify which available ambulance is closest to the scene of an incident allowing for the closest appropriate resource to be dispatched. Other benefits of the MDT are:

- Booking on system to identify which staff member is currently on the vehicle.
- Status updates, allowing the crew to inform the control room of their current status on an incident via a touchscreen menu rather than informing them over the radio.
- 2-way text conversation with the control room to decrease unnecessary radio demand.
- Request additional payment for soiled uniform when clothing is contaminated.

== See also ==
- Portable data terminal
