= Next Generation 112 =

Emergency communication protocol

Next Generation 112 (NG112) is a blueprint for emergency communications which are entirely based on Internet Protocol (IP) technology, from the citizen requesting help to the Public Safety Answering Point (PSAP) responding to that request. Over the last decade or so, publicly available electronic communications network providers (both fixed and mobile) have started their respective journeys toward migrating to Next-generation networks. Network rollouts are more advanced in some countries than others but by the end of the 2020s, networks will be predominantly IP-based providing a platform for innovative multimedia communications. In mobile networks this will be based on 4G and 5G technology and most voice communications will be based on Session Initiation Protocol (SIP). Public authorities need to respond to these developments so that PSAPs are equipped to receive emergency communications originating on many different types of devices and applications. NG112 provides the basis for this as a flexible, scalable and future-proofed platform for emergency communications.

== NG 112, NG 9-1-1, NG 999 and NG 000 ==
112 is the common number for emergency communications in the European Union, 911 for North America, 999 for the United Kingdom and other countries and NG 000 for Australia and New Zealand. These are essentially the same concepts: an IP-based end-to-end platform for emergency communications with commonly defined protocols and interfaces. NG112 is based on the same principles as NG 9-1-1, an initiative aimed at updating the 911 service infrastructure in the United States to improve public emergency communications services. Building on the work of the Internet Engineering Task Force (IETF), the National Emergency Number Association (NENA) developed Functional & Interface Standards for NG9-1-1 and continues to evolve the standards as NG 9-1-1 is rolled out in the United States and Canada. The European Emergency Number Association (EENA) published its Long-Term Definition for NG112 in 2013 based on NENA's i3 Solution - Stage 3. In 2019, the British Association of Public Safety Communications Officials (BAPCO), published a whitepaper on Next Generation 999 in order to catalyse debate and discussion on the future of the 999 service. The whitepaper cautions that the barriers to advancing a next generation of the 999 service are organisational and political, not technological. Technology is leaping forward, but the transformation of the emergency services is sluggish and there is a real danger of being left behind and failing the public. All NG projects worldwide have the same objective. Making the highest possible quality emergency communications equally accessible to all citizens from the communications devices, services and applications they use every day.

== Technical standards for NG 112 ==
In 2019, the European Telecommunications Standards Institute (ETSI) published TS 103 479 defining core elements of the architecture for network independent access to emergency services which enables multimedia communications (text, video, together with location or additional data) which is not possible on the current phone-based system. NG 112 is a particular focus for ETSI's Special Committee on Emergency Telecommunications.

== Standardized architecture and components ==
The dotted line in the Figure 1 below distinguishes the PSAP domain from the public network domain. At its foundation is the Emergency Services IP Network (ESInet), a private and managed IP network of networks serving a set of PSAPs, a region, a state, or a set of states. The ESInet has different interfaces for different types and different generations of public network and it hosts the core components of the NG112 architecture. The ESInet enables more efficient call-routing based not only on the location of the caller but on other parameters, for example the language of the caller.

A short description of the components is provided in Table 1 below:
Component/Acronym	Short description
Access Network Provider (ANP), Voice Service Provider (VSP) and Emergency Call Service Provider (ECSP), Emergency Call Routing Function (ESRF)	In the public network domain, an emergency call originates on with an ANP, is forwarded via a VSP to an ECSP which then determines the appropriate interface/entry point, through an ESRF. The call is then sent to the correct BCF for routing to the most appropriate PSAP inside the ESInet.
Border Control Function (BCF)	A BCF is the entry point (point-of-interconnect) to the ESInet infrastructure where all emergency calls from external networks transit. There may be different BCFs for emergency calls originating on different types/generations of network.
Emergency Service Routing Proxy (ESRP)	An ESRP is the base routing function for emergency calls inside the ESInet. It routes a call to the next hop until it reaches the appropriate PSAP.
Emergency Call Routing Function (ECRF)	An ECRF routes the call to the correct PSAP and may be used by the PSAP to route calls to the correct responders.
Call Bridging function (BRIDGE)	A BRIDGE is used to transfer calls and conduct conferences when necessary involving citizens and PSAPs or between PSAPs.
Location Information Service (LIS)	A LIS supplies location to an endpoint in the form of a value (actual location coordinates) or a reference (i.e. to a database entry containing a value).

                 Table 1: NG112 core component acronyms (source: ETSI TS 103 479) and a short description of the role of each component.

== Regulatory landscape for NG 112 ==
Legislation foresees an environment where emergency communications can be sent and received using different media types. In Europe for example, the European Electronic Communications Code (EECC), defines an “emergency communication” as a “means of communication that includes not only voice communications services, but also SMS, messaging, video or other types of communications, for example real time text, total conversation and relay services”. Further legislation, in the form of delegated acts from the European Commission in accordance with Article 109(8) of the EECC, will come into effect in the coming years “to ensure the compatibility, interoperability, quality, reliability and continuity of emergency communications in the Union”. These delegated acts are likely to focus on improving access to emergency services for people with disabilities as well as for people who are travelling in other countries. The first delegated act will come into effect by 21 December 2022. Changes to eCall regulations are also anticipated as mobile operators prepare for 2G and 3G switch off. Cars will be fitted with In-Vehicle Systems capable of supporting IP-based communications and PSAPs will need to adapt to be able to receive calls and to process the Minimum Set of Data (MSD) received with the call. NG112 provides the platform for a seamless transition for Next Generation eCall.

== Flexibility, scalability and security ==
NG112 also provides a flexible architecture that will help enable remote working for emergency call takers when needed, something that was not possible for most emergency services during the COVID-19 pandemic. Additionally, it will make it possible to scale, optimize and distribute emergency calls between PSAPs based on predefined or reactionary policies thus improving the overall efficient use of the available resources. Furthermore, moving to dedicated networks for public safety organizations would render them less vulnerable to cyberattacks thereby securing the critical infrastructure of emergency response.

== NG112 plugtests ==
With ETSI, EENA has co-organised a series of NG112 Emergency Communications Plugtest events. The purpose of the plugtests is to trial independently and jointly all components of the 112 communications chain based on NG112 networks, such as: location-based call routing; audio, video and real-time text; policy-based routing; and much more. The NG112 Emergency Communications Plugtests examine and validate the interoperability and conformity of several market solutions using different scenarios and test cases. The reports from the plugtests are available:

- NG112 Emergency Communications Plugtest event 1st edition: March 2016 Report
- NG112 Emergency Communications Plugtest event 2nd edition: March 2017 Report
- NG112 Emergency Communications Plugtest event 3rd edition: February 2019 Report

== NG112 projects ==
In April 2019, EENA launched an NG112 project involving three different consortia covering five different countries: Austria, Italy, Denmark, Turkey and Croatia. The project's objective was to test and deploy the NG112 architecture in different countries, focusing on demonstrating its use in real-life environments. The use cases included voice and video Internet Protocol (IP) calls, real-time text, cross-border emergency communications and initiating emergency communications from a home speaker. The final reports from the project detail how the consortia successfully demonstrated the value of the NG112 architecture, particularly in terms of accurate, policy-based cross-border routing capabilities, accessibility, decision-making and resource allocation. The final reports from the project are available – CELESTE Consortium, Croatian Consortium and Turkish Consortium.

== Project next generation emergency services (NEXES) ==
The NEXES Research and Innovation Action aims to research, test and validate the promising integration of IP-based communication technologies and interoperability into the next generation emergency services, so that they attain increased effectiveness and performance. Empowered by smartphones with cameras, messaging and internet-based applications connecting to social media, citizens expect emergency services to use the same technologies. However, this is not the case. NEXES innovates the approach to the dynamics between emergency services and citizens, allowing:

i. the use of total conversation capabilities in emergencies, including social media, to the benefit of citizens, including those with disability or special needs;
ii. the exploitation of improved location information to rapidly and effectively identify and locate the caller and the incident site; and
iii. the leverage of Internet-enabled connectivity to enhance interoperability and shared awareness among emergency services, to the benefit of a more secure society.

== Project next generation emergency communicationSs (EMYNOS) ==
Current emergency systems and 112 services are based on legacy telecommunication technologies, which cannot cope with IP-based services that European citizens use every day. Some of the related limitations are the partial media support (so far, only voice calls and SMS are accepted), the lack of integration of social media, and the use of an analogue modem for providing eCall services with limited data amount. As most operators have started migrating towards broadband IP-based infrastructures, current emergency systems need also to be upgraded/adapted in order to fulfill regulatory requirements in terms of Next Generation emergency services. Τhe main objective of EMYNOS project is the design and implementation of a Next Generation platform capable of accommodating rich-media emergency calls that combine voice, text, and video, thus constituting a powerful tool for coordinating communication among citizens, call centres and first responders. With the deployment of 5G and the Internet of Things (IoT), more and more data will be available. This data should be made accessible to help save lives in a way that is secure and respectful of privacy. Currently, this is not possible. Without a coordinated action based on standards, each company managing IoT or 5G data will have to find a way to send this data to various emergency services. In such a scenario, emergency services will have to adapt to the way each company wants to send the data and to the variety of formats. This will be costly, ineffective, and insecure.

- Citizens increasingly expect to be able to reach emergency services using the tools they use every day: 112 cannot be accessible only by voice.
- Too many disparate and uncoordinated initiatives are taking place without a strong technical and legal framework, posing strong risks to standardisation, security, and privacy.
- Without a coordinated action based on international standards, non-standardised NG112-types of deployments will dominate the market and set a new de facto European standard (highly probably set by non-European companies).
