= 999 =

999 or triple nine most often refers to:

- 999 (emergency telephone number), a telephone number for the emergency services in several countries
- 999 (number), an integer
- AD 999, a year
- 999 BC, a year

== Media ==
=== Books ===
- 999 (anthology) or 999: Twenty-nine Original Tales of Horror and Suspense, a 1999 anthology of short stories
- Galaxy Express 999, a manga and anime created by Leiji Matsumoto

=== Film and television ===
- Triple 9, a 2016 heist-thriller film
- 999 (British TV series), a British programme presented by Michael Buerk that aired on the BBC
- 999 (Malaysian TV series), a 2004 Malaysian crime reality television series
- 999: What's Your Emergency?, a 2012 British factual programme following the emergency service
- Triple Nine (TV series), a Singaporean television series running from 1995 to 1999

=== Music ===
- 999 (band), a London punk rock band active since the 1970s
- 999 (album), a self-titled album by the band 999
- 999 (EP), an EP by Olamide
- 999 (MC Lars album), an album by MC Lars
- 999 (Selena Gomez and Camilo song)
- "999" (Kent song)
- "999", a song from Keith Richards' album Main Offender (1992)
- 999, a number often used by Juice WRLD

=== Video games ===
- 999: Nine Hours, Nine Persons, Nine Doors, a 2009 video game developed by Chunsoft

== Transportation ==
- Ducati 999, an Italian motorcycle
- New York Central and Hudson River Railroad No. 999, the first steam locomotive in the United States to operate at faster than 100 mph
- Ford 999, a pioneering 1902 racer named for the locomotive

== Other uses ==
- 999 Zachia, an asteroid
- 9–9–9 Plan, a tax plan proposed by 2012 Republican presidential candidate Herman Cain
- 999 phone charging myth, an urban myth that calling the emergency services charges mobile phones
- Nine (purity), an informal way of ranking purity; "three nines" would be 99.9% pure
- "Three nines" as a level of high availability (99.9%)
- Triple Nine Society, a society for people with IQs in the 99.9th percentile

== See also ==
- 0.999... for proofs that 0.999... is equal to 1
