= 3pcc =

Conference call in telephony

In the traditional telephony context, third party call control allows one entity (which we call the controller) to set up and manage a communications relationship or telephone call between two or more other parties. Third party call control (referred to as 3pcc) is often used for operator services (where an operator creates a call that connects two participants together) and conferencing.

Similarly, many SIP services are possible through third party call control. These include the traditional ones on the PSTN, but also new ones such as click-to-dial. Click-to-dial allows a user to click on a web page to speak to a customer service representative. The web server then creates a call between the user and a customer service representative. The call can be between two phones, a phone and an IP host, or two IP hosts.

Third party call control is possible using only the mechanisms specified within RFC 3725. Indeed, many different call flows are possible, each of which will work with SIP compliant user agents. However, there are benefits and drawbacks to each of these flows. The usage of third party call control also becomes more complex when aspects of the call utilize SIP extensions or optional features of SIP. In particular, the usage of RFC 3312 (used for coupling of signaling to resource reservation) with third party call control is non-trivial, and is discussed in Section 9 of RFC 3725. Similarly, the usage of early media (where session data is exchanged before the call is accepted) with third party call control is not trivial; both of them specify the way in which user agents generate and respond to SDP, and it is not clear how to do both at the same time. This is discussed further in Section 8.

Third Party Call Control is perfectly suited for delivery of 9-1-1 calls in a Next Generation 9-1-1 environment. It allows for re-connection of the media stream to an alternate end point if the original destination end point becomes unavailable without dropping the original emergency call (which has a separate media stream to the 3PCC server). Additionally, it minimizes bandwidth requirements between the 3PCC server and the emergency call handling end point because all mixed media uses the same RTP stream. Finally, it does not rely on a destination end point for end to end reliability but rather on a more robust centralized data center with several redundantly deployed servers.

== See also ==
- Calling party
- Called party
- Next Generation 9-1-1
- Click-to-call
- Third Party Control Protocol
