= 911 Tapping Protocol =

Means by which those hard of hearing can utilize 9-1-1

The 911 Tapping Protocol is an initiative developed by the government of New York City to provide members of the deaf and hard of hearing community, as well as others who are unable to voice, with a means of directly reporting emergencies to 911 from the streets of New York City.

The tapping protocol can be employed when calling 911 from a pay phone or when using one of New York City's emergency call boxes to summon help. In both cases, the person reporting the emergency communicates with the 911 call-taker by tapping in a specific pattern with a finger, pen, key, etc., on the mouthpiece of the phone or the speaker section of the call box.

Two tapping patterns are used in order to distinguish the type of assistance requested: a steady tapping pattern indicates a request for police assistance, while a repeated two-tap pattern indicates a request for fire and emergency medical service ("EMS") response. The person reporting the emergency should employ the appropriate tapping method for at least 90 seconds, and ideally until the requested emergency services arrive. If possible, the person should remain at the pay phone or call box location to direct arriving emergency personnel to the emergency.

== History ==
The tapping protocol was introduced in 1996 to meet a federal court's requirement that New York offer a 911 notification alternative that would "provide the hearing-impaired with a means of identifying not only their location, but also the type of emergency being reported." Under New York City's Enhanced 911 ("E-911") system, every telephone and emergency call box automatically transmits its location to 911 operators, so that an operator receiving a tapping call will have the caller's location on-screen and will be able to distinguish, by the tapping pattern, which emergency services are being requested.

== See also ==
- Text-to-911
