= TPCP =

TPCP may refer to:

- Tetraphenylcyclopentadienone in Chemistry
- Third Party Control Protocol in communications
- That Peter Crouch Podcast in entertainment
