= 911 (emergency telephone number) =

United States & Canadian telephone number for emergencies

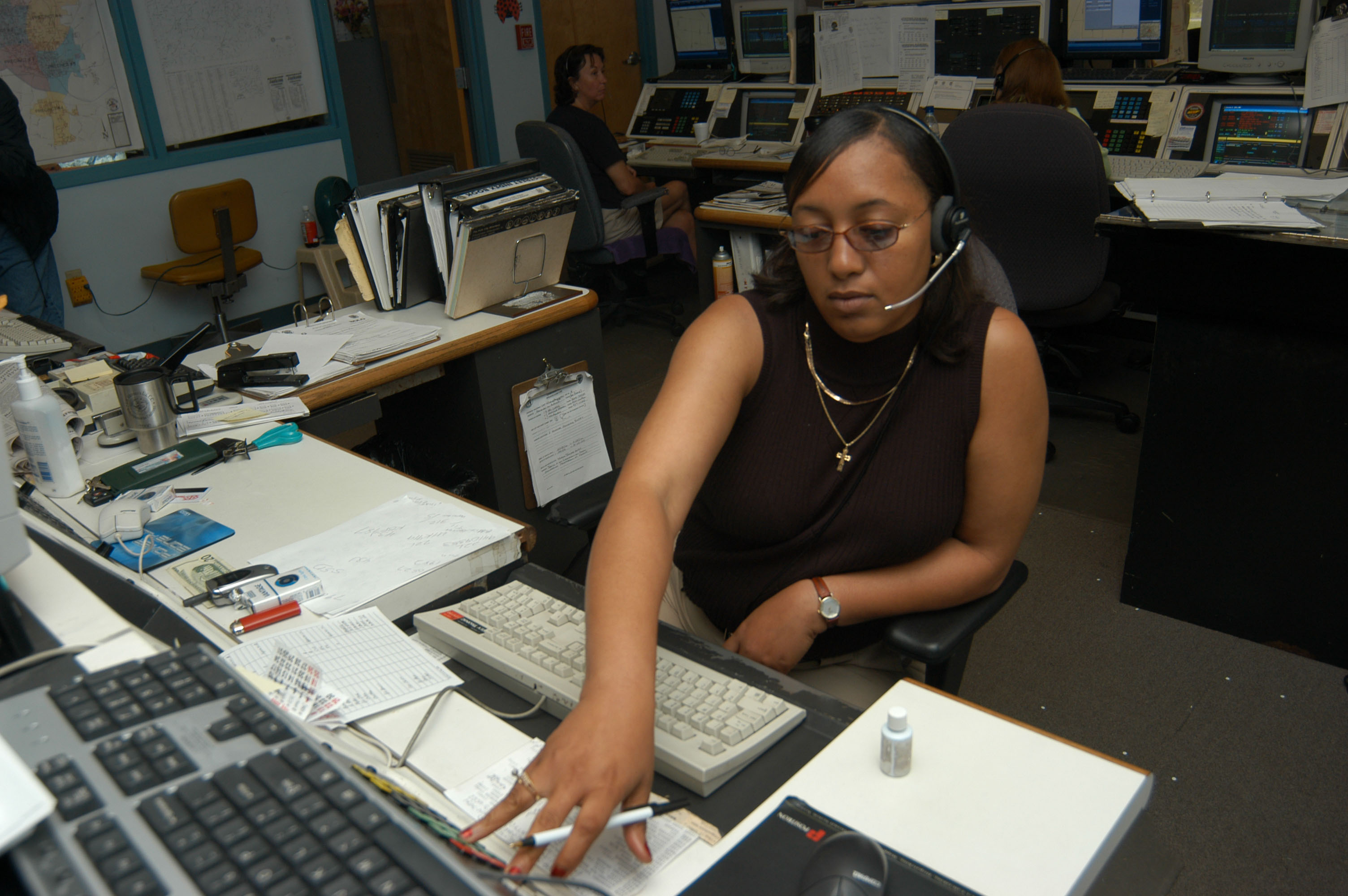
A dispatcher takes an emergency call at the Jackson, Tennessee, 9-1-1 Dispatch Center.

911, sometimes written 9-1-1, is an emergency telephone number in Canada and the United States, one of eight N11 codes of the North American Numbering Plan (NANP). Dialing 911 from any telephone will link the caller to an emergency dispatch office—called a public safety answering point (PSAP) by the telecommunications industry—which can send emergency responders to the caller's location in an emergency. In approximately 96 percent of the United States, the enhanced 911 system automatically pairs caller numbers with a physical address.

Like other emergency numbers, dialing 911 for purposes other than reporting an emergency is a crime in most jurisdictions. Penalties for abuse or misuse of 911 can range from probation or community service to fines and jail time. Offenders can also be ordered to undergo counseling and have their use of telephones restricted or suspended for a period of time as a condition of probation.

Venezuela also has a 911 emergency service called VEN911.

== History ==
The first use of a national emergency telephone number began in the United Kingdom in 1937 using the number 999, which continues to this day. In the United States, the first 911 service was established by the Alabama Telephone Company and the first call was made in Haleyville, Alabama in 1968 by Alabama Speaker of the House Rankin Fite and answered by U.S. Representative Tom Bevill. In Canada, 911 service was adopted in 1972, and the first 911 call occurred after a 1974 roll-out in London, Ontario.

In the United States, the push for the development of a nationwide American emergency telephone number came in 1957 when the National Association of Fire Chiefs recommended that a single number be used for reporting fires. The first city in North America to use a central emergency number was the Canadian city of Winnipeg, Manitoba, in 1959, which instituted the change at the urging of Stephen Juba, Mayor of Winnipeg at the time. Winnipeg initially used 999 as the emergency number but switched numbers when 911 was proposed by the United States.

In 1964, the rape and murder of Kitty Genovese in New York City greatly increased the urgency to create a central emergency number. The New York Times falsely reported that nobody had called the police in response to Genovese's cries for help. Some experts theorized that one source of reluctance to call police was due to the complexity of doing so; any calls to the police would go to a local precinct, and any response might depend on which individual sergeant or other ranking personnel might handle the call.

In 1967, the President's Commission on Law Enforcement and Administration of Justice recommended the creation of a single number that could be used nationwide for reporting emergencies. The Federal Communications Commission then met with AT&T in November 1967 in order to choose the number.

In 1968, the number was agreed upon. AT&T chose the number 911, which was simple, easy to remember, dialed quickly (999, with the rotary dial phones in place at the time, would take longer), and because of the middle 1, which indicated a special number (see also 4-1-1 and 6-1-1), worked well with the phone systems at the time. At the time, this announcement only affected the Bell System telephone companies; independent phone companies were not included in the emergency telephone plan. Alabama Telephone Company decided to implement it ahead of AT&T, choosing Haleyville, Alabama, as the location.

AT&T made its first implementation in Huntington, Indiana on March 1, 1968. However, the rollout of 911 service took many years. For example, although the City of Chicago, Illinois, had access to 911 service as early as 1976, the Illinois Commerce Commission did not authorize telephone service provider Illinois Bell to offer 911 to the Chicago suburbs until 1981. Implementation was not immediately available; by 1984, only eight Chicago suburbs in Cook County had 911 service. As late as 1989, at least 28 Chicago suburbs still lacked 911 service; some of those towns had previously elected to decline 911 service due to costs and—according to emergency response personnel—failure to recognize the benefits of the 911 system.

Regarding national US coverage, by 1979, 26% of the US population could dial the number. This increased to 50% by 1987 and 93% by 2000. As of March 2022, 98.9% of the US population has access.

Conversion to 911 in Canada began in 1972, and as of 2018 virtually all areas (except for some rural areas, such as Nunavut) are using 911. As of 2008, each year Canadians make twelve million calls to 911. On November 4, 2019, the Northwest Territories launched the 911 service across the territory with the ability to receive service in the territory's 11 official languages.

On September 15, 2010, AT&T announced that Tennessee had approved a service to support a Text-to-911 trial statewide, where AT&T would be able to allow its users to send text messages to 911 PSAPs.

Most British Overseas Territories in the Caribbean use the North American Numbering Plan; Anguilla, Bermuda, the British Virgin Islands, and the Cayman Islands use 911.

Mexico switched its emergency phone number from 066 to 911 in 2016 and 2017.

== Enhanced 911 ==
Enhanced 911 (E-911 or E911) automatically gives the dispatcher the caller's location, if available. Enhanced 911 is available in most areas, including approximately 96 percent of the US.

In all North American jurisdictions, legislation permits emergency operators to obtain a 911 caller's telephone number and location information. This information is gathered by mapping the calling phone number to an address in a database. This database function is known as Automatic Location Identification (ALI). The database is generally maintained by the local telephone company, under a contract with the PSAP. Each telephone company has its standards for the formatting of the database. Most ALI databases have a companion database known as the MSAG, Master Street Address Guide. The MSAG describes address elements including the exact spellings of street names, and street number ranges.

To locate a mobile telephone geographically, there are two general approaches: some form of radiolocation from the cellular network, or to use a Global Positioning System receiver built into the phone itself. Both approaches are described by the radio resource location services protocol (LCS protocol). Depending on the mobile phone hardware, one of two types of location information can be provided to the operator. The first is Wireless Phase One (WPH1), which is the tower location and the direction the call came from, and the second is Wireless Phase Two (WPH2), which provides an estimated GPS location.

In response to E-911 challenges inherent to IP phone systems, specialized technology has been developed to locate callers in the event of an emergency. Some of these technologies allow the caller to be located down to the specific office on a particular floor of a building. These technologies support a wide range of organizations with IP telephony networks. These offerings are available for service providers offering hosted IP PBX and residential Voice over Internet Protocol (VoIP) services. This segment of IP phone technology includes E-911 call routing services and automated phone tracking appliances. Many of these services have been established according to FCC, CRTC, and NENA i2 standards, to help enterprises and service providers reduce liability concerns and meet E-911 regulations.

The enhanced 911 System

== Computer-aided dispatch ==
911 dispatchers use computer-aided dispatch (CAD) to record a log of EMS, police and fire services. It can either be used to send messages to the dispatched via a mobile data terminal (MDT) and/or used to store and retrieve data (i.e. radio logs, field interviews, client information, schedules, etc.). A dispatcher may announce the call details to field units over a two-way radio. Some systems communicate using a two-way radio system's selective calling features.

CAD systems may send text messages with call-for-service details to alphanumeric pagers or wireless telephony text services like SMS.

== Funding ==
In the United States and Canada, 911 is typically funded via monthly fees on telephone customers. Telephone companies, including wireless carriers, may be entitled to apply for and receive reimbursements for costs of their compliance with laws requiring that their networks be compatible with 911. Fees depend on locality and may range from around 25¢ to $3.00 per month, per line. The average wireless 911 fee is around 72¢.

Monthly fees usually do not vary based on the customer's usage of the network, though some states do cap the number of lines subject to the fee for large multi-line businesses.

These fees defray the cost of providing the technical means for connecting callers to a 911 dispatch center; emergency services themselves are funded separately.

== Problems ==
=== Inactive telephones ===
Some U.S. states required that all landline telephones connected to the network be able to reach 911, even if normal service has been disconnected (as for nonpayment). In the US, carriers are required to connect 911 calls from inactive mobile phones. Similar rules apply in Canada. However, dispatchers may not receive Phase II information for inactive lines, and may not be able to call back if an emergency call is disconnected.

=== Cell phones ===
About 70 percent of 911 calls came from cell phones in 2014, and finding out where the calls came from required triangulation. A USA Today study showed that where information was compiled on the subject, many of the calls from cell phones did not include information allowing the caller to be located. Chances of getting as close as 100 feet (30 metres) were higher in areas with more towers. But if a call was made from a large building, even that would not be enough to precisely locate the caller. New federal rules, which service providers helped with, require location information for 40 percent of calls by 2017 and 80 percent by 2021. In addition, if a cellphone is connected to a cell tower in a different jurisdiction, which can happen often in a border community, the 911 call will go to the wrong dispatch center.

As of 2018, 80 percent of 911 calls in the United States were made on cell phones, but the ability to do so by text messaging was not required. Text-to-911 was first used in Iowa in 2009. According to the FCC, only 1,600 of about 6,000 911 call centers had the ability, up from 650 in 2016.

Certain cell phone operating systems allow users to access local emergency services by calling any country's version of 911.

=== Internet telephony ===
If 911 is dialed from a commercial VoIP service, depending on how the provider handles such calls, the call may not go anywhere at all, or it may go to a non-emergency number at the public safety answering point associated with the billing or service address of the caller. Because a VoIP adapter can be plugged into any broadband internet connection, a caller could be hundreds or even thousands of miles away from home, yet if the call goes to an answering point at all, it would be the one associated with the caller's address and not the actual location of the call. It may never be possible to reliably and accurately identify the location of a VoIP user, even if a GPS receiver is installed in the VoIP adapter, since such phones are normally used indoors, and thus may be unable to get a signal.

In March 2005, commercial VoIP provider Vonage was sued by the Texas Attorney General, who alleged that their website and other sales and service documentation did not make clear enough that Vonage's provision of 911 service was not done traditionally. In May 2005, the FCC issued an order requiring VoIP providers to offer 911 service to all their subscribers within 120 days of the order being published. In Canada, the federal regulators have required Internet service providers (ISPs) to provide an equivalent service to the conventional PSAPs, but even these encounter problems with caller location, since their databases rely on company billing addresses.

VoIP services operating in Canada are required to provide 911 emergency service. In April 2008, an 18-month-old boy in Calgary, Alberta, died after a Toronto VoIP provider's 911 operator had an ambulance dispatched to the address of the family's previous abode in Mississauga, Ontario.

=== Emergencies across jurisdictions ===
When a caller dials 911, the call is routed to the local public safety answering point. However, if the caller is reporting an emergency in another jurisdiction, the dispatchers may or may not know how to contact the proper authorities. The publicly posted phone numbers for most police departments in the US are non-emergency numbers that often specifically instruct callers to dial 911 in case of emergency, which does not resolve the issue for callers outside of the jurisdiction.

NENA has developed the North American 911 Resource Database which includes the National PSAP Registry. PSAPs can query this database to obtain emergency contact information of a PSAP in another county or state when it receives a call involving another jurisdiction. Online access to this database is provided at no charge for authorized local and state 911 authorities.

== See also ==
- 911 Tapping Protocol
- eCall
- Emergency telephone
- Friendly caller program
- Next Generation 911
- Reverse 911
