= Public safety answering point =

Type of call center for first response

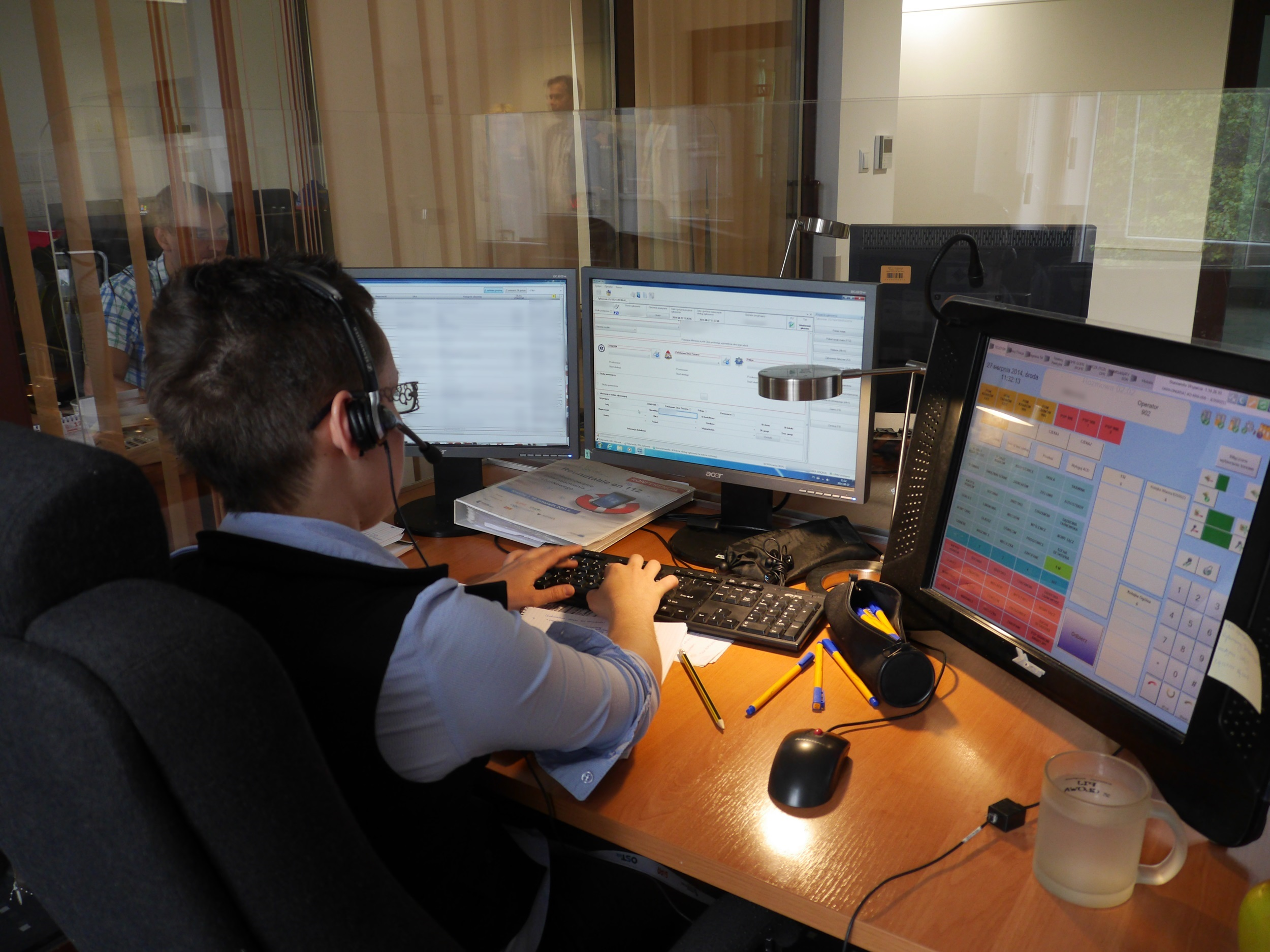
Public-safety answering point in Kraków, Poland

A public safety answering point (PSAP), sometimes called a public safety access point or emergency control centre (ECC), is a type of call center where the public's telephone calls for first responders (such as police, fire department, or emergency medical services/ambulance) are received and handled. It takes calls from any landline, mobile phone line, or VoIP (Voice over Internet Protocol) line. Such call centers exist in most countries to answer calls to an emergency telephone number. Trained telecommunications operators are also usually responsible for dispatching these emergency services. Most PSAPs are now capable of caller location for landline calls, and many can handle mobile phone locations as well (sometimes referred to as phase II location), where the mobile phone company has a handset to location system. Some can also use voice broadcasting where outgoing voice mail can be sent to many phone numbers at once, in order to alert people to a local emergency such as a chemical spill.

== North America ==
In Canada and the United States, the county or a large city usually handles this responsibility, and its PSAP is sometimes called a radio room. As a division of a U.S. state, counties are generally bound to provide this and other emergency services even within the municipalities, unless the municipality chooses to opt out and have its own system, sometimes along with a neighboring jurisdiction. If a city operates its own PSAP, but not its own particular emergency service (for example, city police but county fire), it may be necessary to relay the call to the PSAP that does handle that type of call. The U.S. requires caller location capability on the part of all phone companies, including mobile ones, but there is no federal law requiring PSAPs to be able to receive such information.

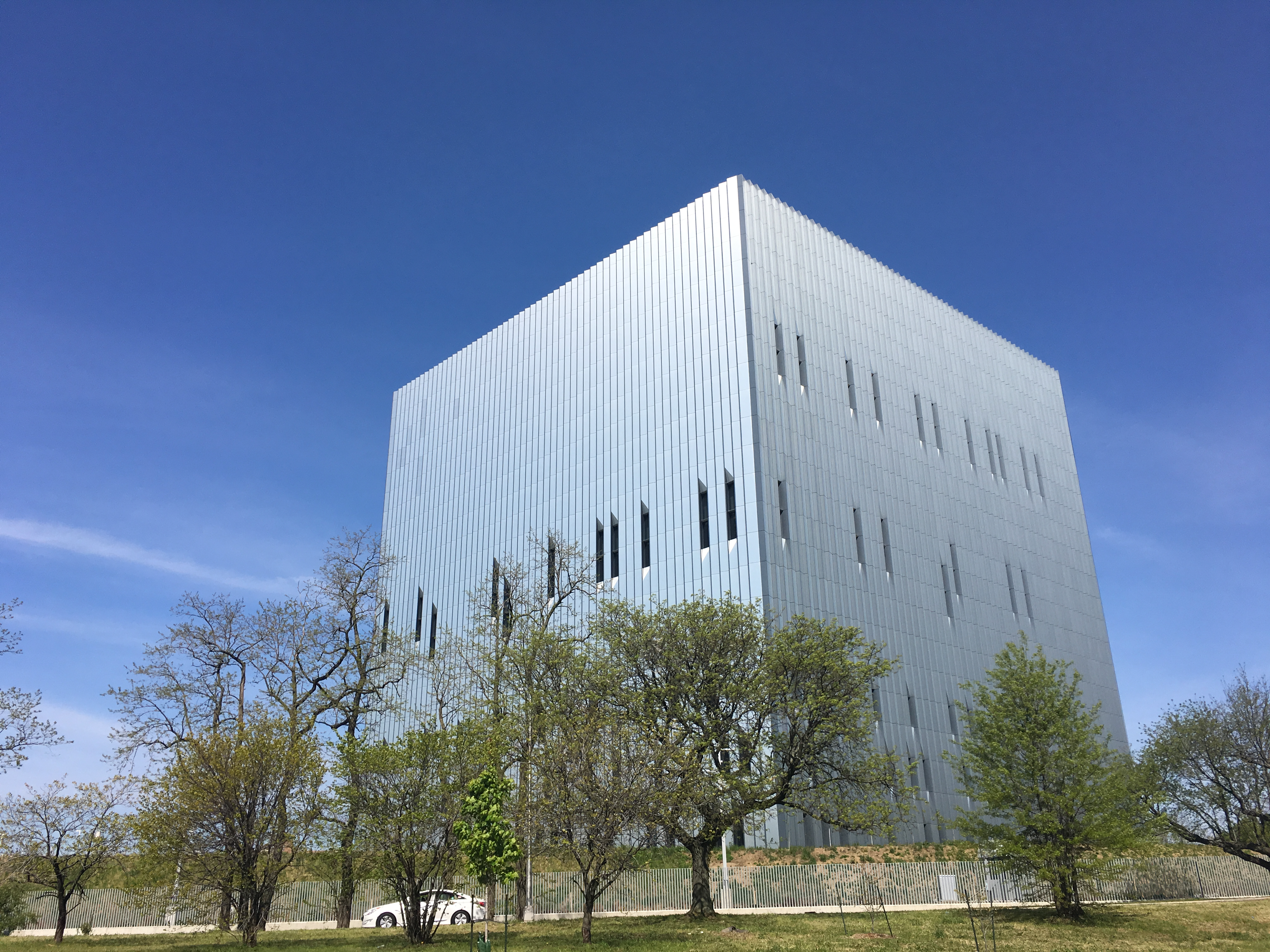
Public Safety Answering Center II in the Bronx, New York City

There are 5,748 primary and secondary PSAPs in the U.S. as of February 2021. Personnel working for PSAPs can become voting members of the National Emergency Number Association (NENA). Emergency dispatchers working in PSAPs can become certified with the National Academies of Emergency Dispatch (NAED), and a PSAP can become an IAED Accredited Center of Excellence.

Each PSAP has a 'real' telephone number that is called when the emergency number (911) is dialed. The telecommunications operator is responsible for associating all landline numbers with the most applicable (often the nearest) PSAP, so that when emergency number is dialed, the call is automatically routed to the most suitable PSAP. PSAPs can be subject to changes including new contact information and changing coverage area. Commercial products exist that purport to keep pace with these changes and allow the telecommunications operator to associate numbers with the relevant PSAP based upon their physical address associated with that number.

== Australia ==
In Australia, all Triple Zero (000) emergency calls are routed to an Emergency Service Access Point staffed by Telstra as the national "responsible person". Callers are connected to one of several Access Points across Australia, with a call-taker asking for the service required (police, fire or ambulance) and the town or location. The call taker then connects the caller to the closest emergency operations or communications centre for the required service, such as Triple Zero Victoria, a Queensland Ambulance Operations Centre or the Darwin Joint Emergency Services Communications Centre.

Calls to the Triple Zero network from Norfolk Island or Cocos (Keeling) Islands are automatically routed directly to each island's respective emergency service centre, typically the local hospital or health service, from which local resources are coordinated from.

== United Kingdom ==
In the United Kingdom, callers make initial contact through the 999 emergency telephone service, where their calls are answered at an operator assistance centre (OAC). From here the telephone company's operator directs the call to the relevant ECC.

The single greatest use of United Kingdom ECCs is made by police forces, but there are four principal emergency services which maintain full-time ECC provision, nationwide. These are the police, ambulance services, fire and rescue services, and the Coastguard. A number of additional emergency services make use of the ECC of one of the four full-time services; for example, mountain rescue are contacted through police ECCs, and the lifeboat service is contacted through Coastguard ECCs.

Cleveland Police were the only force in the UK that have a privately run ECC, although this was bought back inhouse.

== India ==
In India, a police control room (PCR) is a building or room where communication between different levels of a police serves takes place. Police control rooms also handle calls from the general public via 100, the national police helpline number, or 112, much like ECCs or PSAPs. PCRs also often handle non-emergency calls, such as disaster and traffic assistance, counseling, among others. Most of India's police districts have their own police control room, and police commissionerates normally also have central control rooms. Patrol vehicles, usually under the control of a PCR, are popularly known as "PCR vans" or "PCR vehicles"; some states have other names for these vehicles.

== Other regions ==
In other countries, this may the responsibility of other types of local government, and the particular setup of the telephone network dictates how such calls are handled.

There is also now the ability to answer text messages at some PSAPs, which is useful in areas where weak signal strength due to distance from the nearest cell site causes fringe reception, resulting in blocked or dropped calls. Since SMS messages only require an instant to send, a brief peak in radio propagation (such as a sudden favourable shift in multipath phase alignment) is often enough to get a message sent. Text messages are also useful for the deaf or speech disabled, as it does not require a TTY device.

== Technologies ==
=== NENA i3 Solution ===
The National Emergency Number Association (NENA) long-term solution for emergency calling, referred to as the i3 Solution, assumes end-to-end Internet Protocol (IP) signaling from the Voice over IP (VoIP) endpoint to an IP-enabled Public Safety Answering Point (PSAP), with callback and caller location information provided to the PSAP with the call. While the i3 Solution assumes end-to-end IP connectivity, and it is expected that an increasing number of PSAPs will evolve to support i3 functionality over time, legacy PSAPs must continue to be supported as originating networks and the Emergency Services infrastructure migrate toward IP.

=== Legacy PSAP Gateway ===
The Legacy PSAP Gateway is a functional element of the i3 Solution architecture that supports the interconnection of the i3 ESInet with legacy PSAPs. The Legacy PSAP Gateway is expected to provide interworking and other functionality necessary for emergency calls routed via an i3 Emergency Services IP Network (ESInet) to be delivered to and handled by legacy PSAPs without requiring changes to legacy PSAP Customer Premises Equipment (CPE). Calls routed via an i3 ESInet and delivered to a legacy PSAP must undergo signaling interworking (i.e., at the Legacy PSAP Gateway) to convert the incoming IP-based (i.e., Session Initiation Protocol [SIP]) signaling supported by the ESInet to the traditional Multi-Frequency (MF) or Enhanced Multi-Frequency (E-MF) signaling supported by the legacy PSAP. Functionality must also be applied by the Legacy PSAP Gateway to emergency call originations to allow the legacy PSAP to experience call delivery, Automatic Location Identification (ALI) data retrieval, and feature activation the same way as they do today.

The Legacy PSAP Gateway must also support an ALI interface over which it can receive and respond to ALI queries from legacy PSAPs. Interfaces to a Location Information Server (LIS) and a Legacy Network Gateway must also be supported by the Legacy PSAP Gateway so that it can perform a de-referencing operation if the SIP signaling from the ESInet includes a location-by-reference. In addition, the Legacy PSAP Gateway must support an interface to an Emergency Call Routing Function (ECRF) in the i3 ESInet to support certain emergency call transfer scenarios. The Legacy PSAP Gateway may also support interfaces to Call Information Databases (CIDBs) to support access to additional non-location data associated with the emergency call, if a reference to such data is provided in incoming SIP signaling.

Telcordia GR-3166, Legacy Public Safety Answering Point (PSAP) Gateway Generic Requirements, addresses the external signaling interfaces that must be supported by the Legacy PSAP Gateway, including a SIP interface over which emergency calls will be delivered to it via the i3 ESInet, and traditional MF and/or E-MF interfaces to legacy PSAPs for call delivery.

== See also ==
- Enhanced 911
- Emergency control centre
- North American Numbering Plan
- Next Generation 9-1-1
- Public safety department
- Computer-aided dispatch
