= Location information server =

The location information server, or LIS is a network node originally defined in the National Emergency Number Association i2 network architecture that addresses the intermediate solution for providing e911 service for users of VoIP telephony. The LIS is the node that determines the location of the VoIP terminal.

Beyond the NENA architecture and VoIP, the LIS is capable of providing location information to any IP device within its served access network.

== The role of the LIS ==
Distributed systems for locating people and equipment will be at the heart of tomorrow's active offices. Computer and communications systems continue to proliferate in the office and home. Systems are varied and complex, involving wireless networks and mobile computers. However, systems are underused because the choices of control mechanisms and application interfaces are too diverse. It is therefore pertinent to consider which mechanisms might allow the user to manipulate systems in simple and ubiquitous ways, and how computers can be made more aware of the facilities in their surroundings. Knowledge of the location of people and equipment within an organization is such a mechanism. Annotating a resource database with location information allows location-based heuristics for control and interaction to be constructed. This approach is particularly attractive because location techniques can be devised that are physically unobtrusive and do not rely on explicit user action. The article describes the technology of a system for locating people and equipment, and the design of a distributed system service supporting access to that information. The application interfaces made possible by or that benefit from this facility are presented

=== Location determination ===
The method used to determine the location of a device in an access network varies between the different types of networks. For a wired network, such as Ethernet or DSL a wiremap method is common. In wiremap location determination, the location of a device is determined by finding which cables are used to send packets to the device. This involves tracing data through aggregation points in the network (such as Ethernet switches, or DSL access nodes) and finding the port that packets for that device are sent to. This information is combined with data available to the LIS (usually extracted from a database) to determine a final location. How this tracing is done then depends on the type of network.

In wireless networks, a range of technologies can be applied to location determination, the most basic of which uses the location of the radio transmitter as an approximation. The actual method applied is similar to the wiremap method, if a radio transmitter can be identified, then the location of the device can be given as the position of the transmitter with a region of uncertainty.

== Architecture and protocols ==
The IETF has defined an architecture and protocols for acquiring location information from a LIS. A LIS in the immediate access network is automatically discovered and location information is retrieved using the HELD protocol. Location information can be retrieved directly—known as by value—or the LIS can generate a temporary URI that can be used to provide location indirectly—known as a location URI.

The location information provided by a LIS primarily uses the GEOPRIV format (RFC 4119), an XML representation based on the presence format defined in RFC 3863. RFC 4119 provides a container for both geodetic position and civic address information (now updated by RFC 5139) and also defines elements for expressing a user's privacy preferences.
