= Friendly caller program =

Communication that checks in on vulnerable persons

A friendly caller program is a program in which a 9-1-1 dispatch center regularly calls local older people and persons with disabilities to check on their welfare. If the callers do not call in or answer calls, emergency responders go to their homes. NGOs such as the Red Cross operate similar programs to provide emotional support and suggest wellness resources.
