= Click-to-call =

Web-based communication

Click-to-call, also known as click-to-talk, click-to-dial, click-to-chat and click-to-text, is a form of Web-based communication in which a person clicks an object (e.g., button, image or text) to request an immediate connection with another person in real-time either by phone call, Voice-over-Internet-Protocol (VoIP), or text. Click to talk requests are most commonly made on websites but can also be initiated by hyperlinks placed in emails or videos, and other Internet-based object or user interfaces.

== Basics ==
Click-to-call (CTC) is actually a misleading name for three variations of this technology depending on the implementation and what device the customer is using: from a computer or from a smartphone.

Traditional from a computer: A web consumer click the link and fills in a form to ask a website operator to call her. In other words in this case, "click-to-call" would be more accurately referred to as "Request-a-Call," as in "Please give me a call (here is my phone number)." CTC technology in most instances requires the web consumer to enter his phone number in order for the site operator, or its CSR s, or audio telephony version of an autoresponder, to place the call. CTC technology is now used most often to convert web-based traffic into direct telephone communication between an end user and some other entity. CTC originates out of the older PC2PC telephony whereby a client, or software application, was downloaded onto an end user's own personal computer to interface with the same software running on the other party's computer, to enable a conversation between the two computer users.

Current CTC technology requires no consumer download except perhaps for industry standard plugins such as Flash. Indeed, modern CTC technology reportedly evolved out of its PC client-to-client roots as a direct result of consumer reluctance to download what was, then, the necessary software. Such reluctance is familiar, and is commonly ascribed to fear of viruses and other malware. CTC today is a clientless web to phone service, with the call taking place outside of the consumer's computer. This architecture also improves reliability and quality of service.

Click-to-dial: The click triggers the in phone dialer. In other words in this case, "click-to-call" actually results in a cellular phone call.

Click to talk: This uses WebRTC technology to take the call over the data network (regardless if it is a computer or smartphone) using the built in microphone and speaker.

== Typical implementation ==
The basic form of CTC (Request-a-Call) technology currently in general use is just exactly what Request-a-Call sounds like: an end user enters her phone number through a web dialog box, then an intermediary service calls both that end user and the merchant or other respective third party, and connects the two together for an ordinary telephone conversation. It is instructive to think of this implementation as the familiar three-party call, or conference call. The user wants to talk to a website representative, so the CTC provider calls the user and the representative and then bridges the call between them in one way or another. As to cost, typically the website operator or its client pays for CTC services. It is comparatively rare for a consumer to be charged for CTC services in typical web commerce, except of course in designedly pay-per-call implementations, as may be found on adult websites or other sites with business models involving payment for media presentation. Regardless of who pays, three way calls are more expensive than 2 way calls, so the most cost effective CTC providers drop off after the desired connection is made, preventing pass through of any 3-way call charges.

White papers have confirmed that sufficiently advanced Request-a-Call technology improves website conversion rates so much that Forrester Research reported 143% average ROI on implementing it, with $2.5 million in increased revenues over 3 years and initial payback in just 7–14 months for even the most expensive CTC systems. CTC systems vary greatly in both price and pricing model (flat fee, cost plus, revenue share, etc.).

== Advanced features ==
The most advanced forms of Request-a-Call technology provide some combination of consumer-transparent call tree avoidance or navigation, synchronized user-side full motion video, and varying degrees of end user behavior tracking, analytics, and data capture.

=== Call tree avoidance or navigation ===
Another way to accomplish the same result is by having particular CTC buttons on a website connected to particular phone numbers, answered by experts in the particular products or services marketed on the pages containing that button. In other words, each CTC button can easily connect the end user to a different person or group, whoever is most appropriate. Virtually any CTC provider can provide the latter solution because it depends only on availability of unique target phone numbers. Amazon, for instance, has implemented the call tree navigation/avoidance technique pervasively, especially for expert-intensive products such as HDTVs.

=== Video ===
Video enhancement is the latest evolution of CTC technology. To understand this implementation, imagine that while the other end of your call is being connected, you're watching TV style video on your computer screen with the synchronized audio presentation coming over the telephone. This high impact implementation of Request-a-Call (CTC) technology is generally used to keep the consumer's interest while the appropriate person he needs to speak to is located, perhaps as the call rolls through sequential call connection attempts, trying, e.g., the target's office direct dial, then cell, then home. From a commercial perspective, the video component is more important as an obvious opportunity for a target to emphasize, cross sell, up sell, or otherwise make an "impression," as in "cost per impression" or CPI, on a consumer-browser-inquiring who otherwise might not be converted to a buyer. Such an impression will generally be made on an extremely well targeted audience, because it will only be made on a consumer who requests it, and from a page that allows the web host to know exactly what the consumer's interest is at precisely the time when that consumer is most likely to be in a buying mood.

=== Video engaging enterprise or video chat ===
Video engaging enterprise commonly termed as video chat is another new form of CTC, whereby the customer can click on a button to connect to an operator who appears on the web page over video and speaks to the customer directly through their PC. The customer can either speak through microphone and speakers or headset, text chat, or use a conventional telephone to communicate with the operator. Some Video Chat systems allow the operator to actually navigate the customer around the website, and even in some cases actually co-form-fill with them and process payments. The benefit of this technology is that system operators can build real rapport with customers and answer their questions at a time when they are showing the most interest in a company's products. Lands' End (part of the Sears Corporation) became one of the first retailers in the US to start using the technology in late 2010.

== Historic and emerging implementation ==
=== Autodial ===
An implementation of what was then called CTC technology that was more common in the past was also known as "auto-dial." This implementation is actually a misnomer, because all it did was allow a user to click a button to cause her computer to call the number supplied by the website. The user in this instance is actually initiating an outbound call, little different from if she had dialed it herself the old fashioned way. All that she saved by using this version of CTC was the effort of entering a phone number. On the other hand, this simple gimmick gave us the moniker "Click to Call," which still seems to stick to all the above better and different technologies.

=== History and other names used for similar functionality ===
Other various names used in this subject area have included Web Call, Web Connect, Web Call-Back, Click-to-talk, Web Call Button and Customer Contact Channel Changer (CCCC). CCCC provided "click to change customer contact channels" from web browsing to talking over the PSTN or over VoIP or over web page/text chat exchange. Most of these began in the mid 1990s in North America with several related US and Canadian patents (Listed Below) being developed.

CA 2178705 CUSTOMER CONTACT CHANNEL CHANGER

US 5884032 System for coordinating communications via customer contact channel changing system using call center for setting up the call between customer and an available help agent

US 6311231 Method and system for coordinating data and voice communications via customer contract channel changing system using voice over IP

CA 2391428 SYSTEM FOR OBTAINING HELP OVER A COMMUNICATION SYSTEM BY USING SPECIFIC CUSTOMER CONTACT CHANNELS

US 6668286 Method and system for coordinating data and voice communications via customer contact channel changing system over IP

=== Mobile telephones ===
When a user is browsing using a mobile phone, CTC features tend to be more literal. Phone numbers are highlighted in the same manner a hyperlink would be. Clicking the phone number begins the calling process. Similar to the Auto Dialer mode, this would be the same as the end user pressing each digit to call the other number, except that this is a short cut of pressing just the highlighted number once.

=== Underlying technology ===
The emergence of click to call applications are now primarily due to WebRTC, which is the underlying protocol that modern browsers are using in order to establish RTC connections. By leveraging WebRTC and various VOIP technologies, various software applications are capable of click to call functionality within a web browser.

=== Browser-to-mobile push integration ===
A modern variation of click-to-call is the browser-to-mobile push approach. In this model, a browser extension communicates with a companion mobile application through secure cloud messaging. When a user clicks a telephone number on a webpage, the number is sent as a push notification to their paired smartphone, where it opens directly in the phone dialer.

An example of this implementation is the CallLinks service (<https://calllinks.sochka.com/en>), which allows users to click phone numbers in any desktop browser and instantly transfer them to an Android device for calling. This approach emerged as an alternative to native browser-based click-to-call mechanisms that became deprecated or limited in modern browsers.

== Consumer concerns ==
Some click-to-call services can have shortcomings, such as nuisance calls that cost whoever is paying for the service. Most experienced providers have heuristics in place to eliminate this issue and sophisticated click-to-call consumers will be conscious of privacy issues in this arrangement. In addition, in the past, at least, click-to-call services may have been impacted by legal issues in countries such as India where VoIP may not be or have been legal.

== Google maps and rumors ==
In August 2006, the Wall Street Journal reported a joint effort by eBay and Google which would offer CTC, but Google issued a statement by October 7, 2006, which said Google had reconsidered, this was refuted by Google the next day, and claimed that a bug in their system allowed an anonymous user to point that information. Google was later setting up a new beta CTC system, where AdSense users would be able to submit their phone number, and Google would put a call button next to their website link. Now Google Adwords users can set up CTC functionality.

In November 2006, Google experimented with a callback process in its Google Maps product but eventually removed the feature. As of January 2008, Google is testing click-to-call for businesses listed in search result pages. Some people have indicated that such failure is due to the fact that Google is using the CTC in the Auto Dialer mode, providing little benefits to the end users. Other vendors who provide Callback mode fare differently such as Ingenio was acquired by AT&T Yellow Pages and eStara was acquired by ATG.

PI Microsoft's maps.live.com was rumored to have a similar feature, but it appears to have since disabled it. Some users believed that this was a better feature.

== See also ==
- Third party call control
