= Next Generation 911 =

Telephony project in the United States

Next Generation 911 (abbreviated as NG911) is an initiative aimed at updating the 911 service infrastructure in the United States and Canada to improve public emergency communications services. NG911 requires carriers to implement emergency text messaging services (also known as "text-to-911") through which users can send messages, images, video, and location data to the 911 call center (referred to as a public safety answering point, or PSAP). The initiative also outlines future evolutions of emergency communications and data transfer. NG911 infrastructure is intended to replace the current generation Enhanced 911 infrastructure over time. The National Emergency Number Association (NENA) first identified the need for NG911 in 2000, with development starting in 2003. Since 2006, the US Department of Transportation (DOT) in the United States and the Canadian Radio-television and Telecommunications Commission (CRTC) in Canada have been leading their respective initiatives, which include research and development projects aimed at advancing NG911. On January 24, 2013, the CRTC announced the first step toward a Canadian implementation of NG911 and, in March 2016, began a consultation with the public to discuss what services should be offered, who will play a role in offering these services and how these services should be paid for.

In 2019 California passed SB 96 increasing fees on California telephone lines to fund deployment of Next Generation 911, which the state began to collect on all phone bills. In 2025, after spending $450 million, all work was scrapped and California planned to start from scratch.

== Purpose and history ==
Planning for NG911 started in 2000 and was published in NENA's Future Path Plan in 2001. NENA's NG911 Project began in 2003 and continues to an ultimate goal of establishing national NG911 architecture and operations standards, and implementation plans to accomplish advanced 911 systems and services. Public safety communications experts recognized that the nation's current 911 system was not capable of handling the text, data, images and video that are increasingly common in personal communications. The stated goal of a related USDOT project is: "To enable the general public to make a 911 “call” (any real-time communication – voice, text, or video) from any wired, wireless, or IP-based device, and allow the emergency services community to take advantage of advanced call delivery and other functions through new internetworking technologies based on open standards." The project is aimed at supporting establishment of a national architecture for an NG911 system that would meet these goals, and to create a transition plan for NG911.

The "Proof of Concept" phase of the DOT project, using the architecture designed by NENA, was completed in 2008, and a report was issued on the results of a proof of concept demonstration conducted over the course of that year. That report has served as a basic blueprint for planning and implementation of these capabilities. Actual implementation of these capabilities is expected to take several years, and will require changes to existing communications infrastructure, as well as changes to the way PSAPs operate.

In 2010, Palm Beach County, Florida implemented the first ESInet in the US. AT&T connecting multiple PSAPs utilizing the SIP protocol. In 2012, the State of Washington completed the first Statewide ESInet implementation in the US.

In 2015 the FCC initiated a nationwide task force. The FCC Task Force on Optimal Public Safety Answering Point (PSAP) Architecture (Task Force or TFOPA) has been directed to study and report findings and recommendations on structure and architecture in order to determine whether additional consolidation of PSAP infrastructure and architecture improvements would promote greater efficiency of operations, safety of life, and cost containment, while retaining needed integration with local first responder dispatch and support.

== Enabling technology ==
The NG911 vision relies on 911 specific application functionality on an Emergency Services IP Network (ESInet) to deliver voice, video, text and data "calls" to the PSAP. The protocol used for delivering these "calls" will be the Session Initiation Protocol (SIP), or IP Multimedia Subsystem (IMS, which incorporates SIP). The functional and interface standards developed by NENA describe general SIP and IMS-based architectures that allow responsible 911 Authorities flexibility in developing an infrastructure to support the envisioned features of NG911.

== Statutory authorization ==
The 911 Improvement Act of 2008 requires IP-enabled voice service providers to provide 911 service, allows state and tribal fees to pay for such services, and directs the Federal Communications Commission to gather information to facilitate these services. The Act also provides for grants to public agencies, and requires the 911 Implementation Coordination Office to develop a national plan for migrating to a national IP-enabled emergency network.

== Today's 911 vs. Next Generation 911 ==
In today's 911 environment, the public can primarily make only emergency voice calls and Teletype calls (by deaf or hearing impaired persons). Only minimal data is delivered with these calls, such as automatic number identification, subscriber name and Automatic Location Identification, when available.

In the Next Generation 911 environment, the public will be able to make voice, text, or video emergency "calls" from any communications device via Internet Protocol-based networks. The PSAP of the future will also be able to receive data from personal safety devices such as Advanced Automatic Collision Notification systems, medical alert systems, and sensors of various types. The new infrastructure envisioned by the NG911 project will support national internetworking of 911 services, as well as transfer of emergency calls to other PSAPs—including any accompanying data. In addition, the PSAP will be able to issue emergency alerts to wireless devices in an area via voice or text message, and to highway alert systems.

=== Example scenarios ===
- Deaf and hard of hearing people in the U.S. today sometimes use telecommunications devices for the deaf (TTYs or TDDs) or interpreting services to contact 911. Many deaf people use text messaging and instant messages to communicate with others, but unfortunately, today's 911 is not equipped to accept these media. This under-serviced demographic accounts for approximately 10% of the general population in Canada and the US (20% of those over 65 and 40% of those over 75). In the NG911 environment, hearing and speech impaired individuals will be able to place such a call by sending a text message from their cell phone. They will be able to carry on a text conversation with 911 center personnel, and even send pictures or video when necessary. In 2013, the Canadian Radio-television and Telecommunications Commission (CRTC) in Canada, announced the first phase of the country's NG911 services, implementation of Text with 911 (T911) for the deaf, hard of hearing, and speech impaired community.
- In the event of a major highway accident involving multiple vehicles, including a hazardous material vehicle, the local 911 center may receive many calls from different motorists. This can cause the center to be overloaded with calls, leading to initial confusion of the locations of the multiple crashes. The confusion can delay response times for the necessary equipment and services, which can, in turn, cost lives and delay return to normal traffic flow. In the NG911 environment, everyone in the vicinity with an Internet-connected device can be automatically notified to avoid the area. Highway message signs, and the 5-1-1 system can also display the warning. Any involved vehicle with an Advanced Automatic Collision Notification system automatically sends important crash data to the 911 center, which can dispatch emergency responders even if the passengers are unable to respond.

=== Stakeholders and technologies involved ===
Many pieces of the existing communications and data infrastructure will require modification to make NG911 a reality. The private companies and public agencies that provide these goods and services will be significantly affected. Chief among these are:

- Telecommunications equipment and service providers
- Information technology equipment and service providers
- Telematics, including Advanced Automatic Collision Notification
- Hazmat (hazardous materials) security alerts to or from commercial motor carriers or rail carriers
- Integration of Intelligent transportation systems with public safety communications systems
- Security alarm notification system providers

Other major stakeholders include:

- State and local 911 agencies
- Public safety and emergency management agencies
- Emergency services industry
- Federal departments, including Transportation, Commerce, Homeland Security, Justice and the Federal Communications Commission
- National organizations with active interests in 911
- IT research community
- Standards community

Major contributors and stakeholders in the standards community include:

- Association of Public-Safety Communications Officials-Canada (APCO)
- Association of Public-Safety Communications Officials-International (APCO)
- National Emergency Number Association (NENA)
- International Academies of Emergency Dispatch (IAED)
- Internet Engineering Task Force (IETF)
- Telecommunications Industry Association (TIA)

The NENA NG911 Project and the DOT's NG911 Initiative look to facilitate the involvement of all these stakeholders going forward in order to develop the architecture and migration plan necessary to make NG911 a functional reality.

== Public network infrastructure impacts ==
In order for a useful connection to be made between the Public Safety Answering Point and person reporting the emergency, a number of changes need to be made to the existing infrastructure. For example, if a user is sending a text message, perhaps with video attached, the data needs to be routed to the PSAP that serves the area where the person is currently, and the location of the wireless device must accompany the message. The person's wireless carrier will receive the message first, then forward the message to the appropriate NG911 system, which routes to the appropriate PSAP along with the location information. Since several different protocols may be used by the wireless device (SMS or XMPP text messaging, MMS (Multimedia Messaging Service) or Wireless Application Protocol for multimedia), translation to a common protocol may be required prior to forwarding. In the case of Advanced Automatic Collision Notification data, the service provider must be able to similarly route this data, along with location data toward the PSAP serving the area where the collision occurred. For the PSAP to be able to send out automatic notifications to all wireless devices currently operating in the area of an emergency, a similar routing mechanism must exist in the opposite (outgoing) direction. Here again, the wireless carrier will be forwarding information.

== PSAP infrastructure impacts ==
=== Local PSAP network impacts ===
A High availability IP infrastructure interface will be needed at the PSAP for it to be able to send and receive all this data. A key element of this will be equipment and software to support IP communications. Internal routing of the emergency communications to the appropriate systems (i.e., text, picture and video data to the Computer-assisted dispatch system, and simultaneously to the communications recording system) will require modifications to the existing PSAP network equipment and software. Some of these changes will be non-trivial.

=== Local wireless infrastructure impacts ===
Since some of the emergency communications data will have to be forwarded to field units such as police and fire vehicles, changes will be required to the software running on the terminals that receive the data, and on those that transmit the data. If the existing wireless communications system is Project 25 compliant, little or no change will be required to the transmit/receive equipment itself, since it already supports transmission of any type of data.

=== Communications recording system impacts ===
NG911 requires that these new types of emergency communications (text, pictures, video) be recorded along with the voice communications that have traditionally been recorded. Most existing communications recorders are not capable of recording anything other than audio, and major changes may be required to bring these devices into NG911 compliance. This may require a significant investment on the part of the PSAPs if the existing equipment cannot be modified to support the new requirements.

=== Human resource impacts ===
There will also be significant operational impacts on the PSAP "call takers", dispatchers (those who dispatch emergency vehicles and personnel), and on their managers. Workloads are expected to increase, and significant new training will be required for those responsible for responding to these new communication types. Similar impacts on both public and private emergency response providers, and on Telematics and medical services providers are also anticipated.

== Accessibility ==
Various features of NG911, including text messaging and video messaging, provide accessible features for those who cannot use a regular telephone. It is also considered as a long-term replacement for the use of TDD/TTY devices for the deaf, currently in use with 911. TDD/TTY devices are considered legacy systems, and may be replaced by other real-time text technologies that transmit text as it is being typed. In Europe, real-time text is used in Reach 112 emergency service trials. Reach 112 is a European equivalent of the accessible features of NG911.

== See also ==
- Enhanced 911
