= Katzenbach Commission =

The President's Commission on Law Enforcement and Administration of Justice was a group of 19 people appointed by President Lyndon B. Johnson in 1967 to study the American criminal justice system. Headed by the then-attorney general Nicholas Katzenbach, the commission is also known as Katzenbach Commission. (Note: At the publication of the report, Katzenbach was the United States Under Secretary of State.) Johnson assigned the group the task of fighting crime and repairing the American criminal justice system:

No agency of government has ever in our history undertaken to probe so fully and deeply into the problems of crime in our nation. I do not underestimate the difficulty of the assignment. But the very difficulty which these problems present and the staggering cost of inaction make it imperative that this task be undertaken.

— President Lyndon Johnson

The Commission's final report was issued in 1967 has been described as "the most comprehensive evaluation of crime and crime control in the United States at the time". It laid out reorganization plans for police departments and suggested a range of reforms. Several of the Commission's findings related to the poor treatment of juvenile offenders.
