= Emergency text messaging services =

Technology for operators to receive text

Emergency text messaging services are a technology that enables emergency call operators to receive text messages. Its use is encouraged for people with hearing impairment or who have trouble speaking; it can also be used for situations when calling may pose a safety risk, such as a home invasion or domestic abuse. Concerns mainly arise from the accessibility of such technologies as they are not universally applied and may be inconsistent; therefore, voice calls are generally preferred for its speed, accessibility, and clarity.

A poster by the West Midlands Ambulance Service promoting the emergency text messaging service in the UK

== Description ==
The technology allows an individual that requires emergency assistance may text an emergency number as opposed to calling it. Emergency services are conventionally reached through voice-based calls dialling an emergency telephone number. However, such systems assume that the caller is able to communicate by voice and may exclude the impaired. It is generally presented as an alternative, and not as a replacement, to calling (which is still preferred.) Texting to emergency services present themselves as a viable alternative if the individual is disabled, in a situation where speaking out loud would compromise the caller's safety, where speaking would impede help, or where network coverage is limited, as text messages take up less data. Some services require prior registration (such as in Singapore and the United Kingdom, see below), some are strictly for the medically impaired, while most are available for usage by the public-at-large as necessary.

== Adoption ==
=== Australia ===
Unlike 911 used in the United States, Australia uses triple zero as its emergency number. As of November 22nd 2023, contacting emergency services through texting 000 is not currently possible. However, for individuals with hearing or speech impairment, 106 remains the only option, as it is accessed via a teletypewriter (TTY.)

=== Canada ===
Texting to emergency services is adopted in Canada in the form of T9-1-1, however it is not as mature or accessible as the systems found elsewhere. The system is strictly for used by the 'deaf, deafened, hard of hearing, or speech impaired persons' and is not available for the general public. Furthermore, a voice call to 911 must be made to initiate the text connection and cannot be contacted simply by texting to 911. It also requires registration and a valid messaging plan. It is also noted that coverage is not as extensive compared to other nations, and the Royal Canadian Mounted Police discourages its usage unless medically necessary.

=== France ===
In France, there is a separate phone number for the deaf and hearing impaired, 114. It is separate from the phone numbers 15, 17, 18 or 112. Through this service, individuals can contact emergency services through text and an application. However, it is not strictly restricted to disabled individuals and there is no registration process; the Deputy Director stated that it is for 'anyone... even temporarily.'

=== Singapore ===
In Singapore, a joint initiative called the 'Emergency Short Message Service Helpline Services' allows for texting (via SMS) to reach emergency services. There are two numbers for contacting emergency services through SMS, they are 70999 (Singapore Police Force) and 70996 (Singapore Civil Defence Force.) However, unlike other emergency texting services, it is only available for professionally diagnosed persons with hearing loss and/or speech difficulties and requires registration for usage through organisations such as SG Enable, Singapore Association for the Deaf, or TOUCH Community Services.

=== United Kingdom ===
Texting emergency services in Britain is offered by Relay UK. through a service called emergencySMS (eSMS). Similar to the system in Singapore, individuals must register beforehand to use the service; however it is done in the UK by texting 'register' to 999 instead of contacting a separate association. It was first proposed as an early day motion (EDM) in Parliament and implemented in the United Kingdom in 2009 for impaired individuals.

=== United States ===
In the United States, the technology is referred to as Text-to-911. The Federal Communications Commission (FCC) maintains a registry of areas supporting text-to-911. All carriers are required to send bounce-back messages to inform the sender that the message could not be received if the technology is not supported by the local call centre. Text-to-911 has been supported by all major cellular providers in the United States since 2014, but as of April 2025, it is only supported by approximately 60% of the country's more than 6,000 emergency call centres. However, in many areas that do not support text-to-911, the message will be directed to a statewide response centre. The National Association of the Deaf and AccesSOS maintain a map of counties providing text-to-911.

In August 2009, Waterloo, Iowa, was the first county to begin receiving texts to 911.

==== Challenges for widespread implementation in the US ====
Call centres in the United States are usually funded by both state and federal funding, therefore limited funding and outdated technology have slowed the widespread adoption of text-to-911. Moreover, many communities are concerned about overuse of texting, which may slow response times. This leads to decreased local allocation of resources and funding as it is not conclusive whether text-to-911 is effective to invest in, thereby relying on federal funding which may be slower.

==== Availability by state or territory ====
Below is the list of individual states and territories of the United States of America, sorted by alphabetical order, and their implementation of Text-to-911 (as of July 2024):

State	Two Letter Code	Supporting Text to 911
Alabama	AL	Statewide
Alaska	AK	Partial
Arizona	AZ	Statewide
Arkansas	AR	Partial
American Samoa	AS	No
California	CA	Statewide
Colorado	CO	Partial
Connecticut	CT	Statewide
Delaware	DE	Statewide
District of Columbia	DC	Yes
Florida	FL	Partial
Georgia	GA	Partial
Guam	GU	Yes
Hawaii	HI	Statewide
Idaho	ID	Statewide
Illinois	IL	Partial
Indiana	IN	Statewide
Iowa	IA	Statewide
Kansas	KS	Partial
Kentucky	KY	Partial
Louisiana	LA	Partial
Maine	ME	Statewide
Maryland	MD	Statewide
Massachusetts	MA	Statewide
Michigan	MI	Partial
Minnesota	MN	Statewide
Mississippi	MS	Partial
Missouri	MO	Partial
Montana	MT	Partial
Nebraska	NE	Partial
Nevada	NV	Partial
New Hampshire	NH	Statewide
New Jersey	NJ	Statewide
New Mexico	NM	No
New York	NY	Partial
North Carolina	NC	Statewide
North Dakota	ND	Statewide
Northern Mariana Islands	MP	No
Ohio	OH	Partial
Oklahoma	OK	Partial
Oregon	OR	Partial
Pennsylvania	PA	Statewide
Puerto Rico	PR	Yes
Rhode Island	RI	Statewide
South Carolina	SC	Partial
South Dakota	SD	Statewide
Tennessee	TN	Partial
Texas	TX	Partial
Utah	UT	Statewide
Vermont	VT	Statewide
Virginia	VA	Statewide
U.S. Virgin Islands	VI	Partial
Washington (state)	WA	Statewide
West Virginia	WV	Partial
Wisconsin	WI	Partial
Wyoming	WY	Partial

== See also ==
- 311, the non-emergency number in North America.
- 911 Tapping Protocol, a New York City initiative to provide viable alternatives to voice-based emergency calls for the impaired.
- Emergency medical dispatcher, a professional tele-communicator tasked with organising responses for medical emergencies
- Enhanced 911, a system in the United States that provides location data for call operators to locate the caller.
- Next Generation 9-1-1, a project to modernise the 911 system in the United States
- Reverse 911, a protocol used in North America to inform individuals in a geographic area by public safety organisations.
