= 999 phone charging myth =

Urban legend

The 999 phone charging myth is an urban legend that claims that if a mobile phone has low battery, dialing 999 (or any regional emergency telephone number) charges the phone so it has more power. This was confirmed as untrue by several British police forces, which publicly cited the dangers of making such calls.

== Basis ==
The basis for the belief was a feature of BlackBerry phones: if the battery level was too low, the phone automatically locked down phone features and shut down the phone radio for all calls except to the emergency services. Phone users in the United Kingdom discovered that if they dialled 999 then immediately hung up, it would override the shutdown for several minutes so that phone calls could be made. The belief seems to have originated in UK BlackBerry forums around 2012.

In 2015, telling Siri on an iPhone to "Charge my phone to 100%" would cause the phone to call the emergency services as a secret safety code. This was later traced to a bug in Apple programming that was fixed within a day. The urban legend continued to spread on social media as a prank.

== Response ==
In 2013, Derbyshire Constabulary released a press release telling people not to believe the claim that calling 999 charges the battery. They cited that for every silent or aborted 999 call received, the operators have to call the person back to make sure there is no emergency. These silent calls waste police time that could potentially block responses to real emergencies. Bedfordshire Police also released information asking people not to call 999 except for an emergency as they stated that in the last six months of 2013 they had an increase in hoax 999 calls from people believing the urban legend. Other sources supplemented these press releases by stating that misusing the 999 number is illegal. They also stated that the police could cut off telephones being used to abuse the 999 service.
