= Enhanced 911 =

System that provides a caller's location to emergency dispatchers

Enhanced 911 (E-911 or E911) is a system used in North America to automatically provide the caller's location to 911 dispatchers. 911 is the universal emergency telephone number in the region. In the European Union, a similar system exists known as E112 (where 112 is the emergency access number) and known as eCall when called by a vehicle.

An incoming 911 call is routed to a Public Safety Answering Point (PSAP), which is a call center operated by the local government. At the PSAP, the call is answered by a 9-1-1 dispatcher. The dispatcher's computer receives information from the telephone company about the physical address (for landlines) or geographic coordinates (for wireless) of the caller. This information is used to dispatch police, fire, medical and other services as needed.

== Call routing ==
=== Landline routing ===
Calls to 911 over the public switched telephone network (PSTN) are routed to a special router (known as Selective Router, or 9-1-1 Tandem). The router looks for the address associated with the caller's telephone number in a database. The caller's phone number is known as an Automatic number identification (ANI). The database relating ANIs to addresses is known as Automatic Location Identification (ALI). The router then uses the address to search in the Master Street Address Guide (MSAG) for the Emergency Service Number (ESN) of the appropriate Public Safety Answering Point (PSAP) for that area and connects the call to it.

==== MSAG ====
The Master Street Address Guide (MSAG) is a database of street addresses and corresponding Emergency Service Numbers (ESNs). ESNs represent one or more emergency service agencies (e.g. fire department, law enforcement) designated to serve a specific range of addresses in a geographic area, called an Emergency Service Zone.

=== Wireless routing ===
Calls from cellular phones are received via cell sites by mobile switching centers (MSC). The switching center automatically assigns a unique identifier to each cellular 911 call, known as a "pseudo ANI". The Selective Router connects the call to a PSAP based on the cell tower's location.

== Location transmission ==
Calls made to non-911 emergency numbers (such as the direct line to a police or fire department) might not have automatic location enabled.

Calls to 911 are answered by an operator at a PSAP. In addition to the voice transmission, the telephone network also transmits a number associated with the current call, the ANI. The 911 operator (or their computer) at the PSAP searches a database (ALI) for the ANI to find the caller's location.

The ALI record associated with the query is then returned to the PSAP, where the Customer-premises equipment (CPE) correlates that information with the call taker receiving the call, and displays the information on their computer screen.

Automatic location of the emergency is intended to be faster and more reliable than verbal communication of the location, though this is usually requested anyway for confirmation. It also makes it possible for emergency services to respond when callers cannot communicate their location, because they do not know their location, they are a child, or they are too panicked, too distracted by the ongoing emergency, or do not wish to attract the attention of the perpetrator of a crime in progress.

=== Landline transmission ===
For landline calls the ANI resembles the caller's phone number. The ALI stores a pre-determined address associated with the caller's telephone number.

=== Wireless transmission ===
In parallel to the actual voice call, the ALI database gets periodically updated with more precise and recent location information. Cellular networks can determine a more precise location of the caller's device by using triangulation from the cell towers (radiolocation). In addition to triangulation, a second source of location information may be the caller's phone itself (or other cellular device).

Many phones manufactured after 2005 have GPS receivers built in. When the cellular phone detects that the user is placing an emergency call, it begins to transmit its location to a secure server, from which the PSAP can retrieve it. Cellphone manufacturers may program the phone to enable GPS function automatically (in case it has been turned off) when the user places an emergency call.

For wireless calls, the ANI (or "pseudo-ANI") is a unique number assigned to each individual 911 call, assigned at a mobile switching center.

=== ALI database ===
The 911 system

The ALI database is secured and separate from the public phone network by design.

The ALI is maintained on behalf of local governments by contracted private third parties, generally the incumbent local exchange carrier (ILEC). Often, the contracted 3rd party further subcontracts the actual ALI database management to companies such as Intrado, Bandwidth and TeleCommunication Systems, Inc. The ALI database also feeds the Master Street Address Guide database which is used to route the call to the appropriate PSAP and when the call arrives, the ALI database is queried to determine the location of the caller.

Each ILEC has its own standard for the formatting of the database.

Most ALI databases have a companion database known as the MSAG, Master Street Address Guide. The MSAG describes the exact spelling of streets, street number ranges, and other address elements. When a new account is created, the address is located in the Master Street Address Guide to track the proper Emergency Service Number (ESN) that 911 calls from that phone number should be routed to. Competitive local exchange carriers (CLEC) and other competing wireline carriers negotiate for access to the ALI database in their respective Interconnect Agreement with the ILEC. They populate the database using the ILEC MSAG as a guide.

If the phone number is not in the ALI database, this is known as ALI Failure; the call is then passed to default ESN for the call's trunk line group, which is a PSAP designated for this function. The 911 operator must then ask the incoming caller for their location and redirect them to the correct PSAP. The legal penalty in most states for ALI database lookup failure is limited to a requirement that the telephone company fix the database entry.

== Location determination ==
The way location is determined varies by the type of originating device or network.

=== Landline location ===
Landline or wireline calls originate from a device connected to a known and fixed location connection to the PSTN. These locations are stored in the Automatic Location Information (ALI) database.

Location information is not passed along by the public phone network; only the calling party's phone number is known to the receiver.

=== Wireless location ===
The billing address associated with a cell phone is not necessarily considered the location to which emergency responders should be sent, since the device is portable. This means that locating the caller is more difficult, which resulted in the second phase of the Enhanced 911 service (E911 Phase 2), which relates to locating wireless or mobile telephone devices.

To locate a mobile telephone geographically, there are two general approaches. One is to use some form of radiolocation from the cellular network; the other is to use a Global Positioning System receiver built into the phone itself. Both approaches are described by the Radio resource location services protocol (LCS protocol).

Radiolocation in cellular telephony uses base stations. Most often, this is done through triangulation between radio towers. The location of the caller or handset can be determined several ways:

- Angle of arrival (AOA) requires at least two towers, locating the caller at the point where the lines along the angles from each tower intersect.
- Time difference of arrival (TDOA) works like GPS using multilateration, except that it is the networks that determine the time difference and therefore distance from each tower (as with seismometers).
- Location signature uses "fingerprinting" to store and recall patterns (such as multipath) which mobile phone signals are known to exhibit at different locations in each cell.

The first two depend on a line of sight, which can be difficult or impossible in mountainous terrain or around skyscrapers. Location signatures actually work better in these conditions however. TDMA and GSM networks such as T-Mobile 2G use TDOA. AT&T Mobility initially advocated TDOA, but changed to embedded GPS in 2006 for every GSM or UMTS voice-capable device due to improved accuracy.

Code division multiple access (CDMA) networks tend to use handset-based radiolocation technologies, which are technically more similar to radionavigation. GPS is one of those technologies. Alltel, Verizon Wireless, T-Mobile 3G, and Sprint PCS use Assisted GPS.

Hybrid solutions, needing both the handset and the network include:

- Assisted GPS (Wireless or television) allows use of GPS even indoors
- Advanced Forward Link Trilateration (A-FLT)
- Timing Advance/Network Measurement Report (TA/NMR)
- Enhanced Observed Time Difference (E-OTD)

Mobile phone users may also have a selection to permit location information to be sent to non-emergency phone numbers or data networks, so that it can help people who are simply lost or want other location-based services. By default, this selection is usually turned off, to protect privacy. In areas such as tunnels and buildings, or anywhere else that GPS is not available or reliable, wireless carriers can deploy enhanced location determination solutions such as Co-Pilot Beacon for CDMA networks and LMU's for GSM networks.

The 3GPP specified protocol for handset geolocation in GSM networks is called Radio Resource Location Protocol.

== History ==
The first 911 system was installed in Haleyville, Alabama, in February 1968, as a way to quickly connect a subscriber to the local police station. The system was rapidly adapted and improved by other telephone companies, evolving into the E911 system, which provides both caller location and identification. A pioneering system was in place in Chicago by the mid-1970s, providing both police and fire departments access to the source location of emergency calls. Enhanced 911 is currently deployed in most metropolitan areas in the United States, Canada, and Mexico as well as all of the Cayman Islands.

=== The 911 Act ===
In the US, the Wireless Communications and Public Safety Act of 1999, also known as the 911 Act, mandated the use of E911 and designated 911 as the universal emergency number, including both wireline and wireless phone devices.

=== FCC Requirements ===
The U.S. Federal Communications Commission (FCC) has made several requirements applicable to wireless or mobile phones:

- Basic 911: All 911 calls must be relayed to a call center, regardless of whether or not the mobile phone user is already a customer of the network being used.
- E911 Phase 1: Wireless network operators must identify the phone number and cell phone tower used by callers, within six minutes of a request by a PSAP.
- E911 Phase 2:
  - 95% of a network operator's in-service phones must be E911 compliant ("location capable") by December 31, 2005. (Numerous carriers missed this deadline and were fined by the FCC.)
  - Wireless network operators must provide the latitude and longitude of callers within 300 meters, within six minutes of a request by a PSAP. Accuracy rates must meet FCC standards on average within any given participating PSAP service area by September 11, 2012 (deferred from September 11, 2008).

Location information is used by the wireless network operator to determine to which PSAP to route the call to, and is transmitted to the PSAP for the purpose of sending emergency services to the scene of the incident.

In 1996, the U.S. Federal Communications Commission (FCC) issued an order requiring wireless carriers to determine and transmit the location of callers who dial 911. The FCC set up a phased program: Phase I involved sending the location of the receiving antenna for 911 calls, while Phase II sends the location of the calling telephone. Carriers were allowed to choose to implement 'handset based' location by Global Positioning System (GPS) or similar technology in each phone, or 'network based' location by means of triangulation between cell towers. The order set technical and accuracy requirements: carriers using 'handset based' technology must report handset location within 50 meters for 67% of calls, and within 150 meters for 90% of calls; carriers using 'network based' technology must report location within 100 meters for 67% of calls and 300 meters for 90% of calls.

The order also laid out milestones for implementing wireless location services. The first Phase I wireless 911 call was in September 1997 in Allentown, Pennsylvania. Many carriers requested waivers of the milestones, and the FCC granted many of them. By mid-2005, implementation of Phase II was generally underway, limited by the complexity of coordination required from wireless and wireline carriers, PSAPs, and other affected government agencies; and by the limited funding available to local agencies which needed to convert PSAP equipment to display location data (usually on computerized maps).

In July 2011, the FCC announced a proposed rule requiring that after an eight-year implementation period, at some yet-to-be-determined date in 2019, wireless carriers will be required to meet more stringent location accuracy requirements. If enacted, this rule would require both "handset based" and "network based" location techniques to meet the same accuracy standard, regardless of the underlying technology used. The rule is likely to have no effect as all major carriers will have already achieved over 85% GPS chipset penetration, and are thus able to meet the standard regardless of their 'network based' location capabilities.

=== In Canada ===
In 2009, the Canadian Radio-television and Telecommunications Commission (CRTC) required implementation of Phase II Stage 1 for wireless carrier by February 1, 2010, in areas that provide landline E911. Many Canadians now have access to Phase II service.

== Public-safety answering point (PSAP) ==
The final destination of an E911 call (where the 911 operator sits) is a public safety answering point (PSAP). There may be multiple PSAPs within the same exchange or one PSAP may cover multiple exchanges. The territories (Emergency Service Zone) covered by a single PSAP is based on the dispatch and response arrangements for the fire, police, and medical services for a particular area. All primary PSAPs have a regional Emergency Service Number (ESN), a number identifying the PSAP.

The Caller Location Information (CLI) provided is normally integrated into emergency dispatch center's computer-assisted dispatch (CAD) system. Early CAD systems provided text display of the caller's address, call history and available emergency response resources. In 1994, working in cooperation with the emergency response agencies of Covington, KY, 911 Mapping Systems, Inc. founded in 1992 by Robert Graham Thomas Jr., implemented the first real-time on-screen E911 street map display to highlight the caller's position, nearest available emergency responders and other relevant information such as fire hydrants, hazardous materials and/or other data maintained by the city. Shortly thereafter, integrated mapping became a standard and integral part of all CAD systems and continues to evolve alongside 911 response technology. For Wireline E911, the location is an address. For Wireless E911, the location is a coordinate. Not all PSAPs have the Wireless and Wireline systems integrated.

=== Interconnection details ===
Each telephone company (local exchange carrier, or LEC) has at least two redundant DS0-level (that is, 64 kbit/s, or voice quality) trunks connecting each host office telephone switch to each call center. These trunks are either directly connected to the call center or they are connected to a telephone company central switch that intelligently distributes calls to the PSAPs. These special switches are often known as 911 Selective Routers. Their use is becoming increasingly more common as it simplifies the interconnection between newer ISUP/SS7-based host office switches and the many older PSAP systems.

If the PSAP receives calls from the telephone company on older analog trunks, they are usually Pulse driven circuits. These circuits are similar to traditional telephone lines, but are formatted to pass the calling party's number (Automatic Number Identification, ANI). For historical reasons, the PSAP will refer to these as CAMA circuits even though Centralized Automatic Message Accounting (CAMA) is actually a reference to the call log.

If the PSAP receives calls on older-style digital trunks, they are specially formatted Multi-Frequency (MF) trunks that pass the calling party's number (ANI) only. Some of the upgraded PSAPs can receive calls on ISUP trunks controlled by the SS7 protocol. In that case, the calling party's number (ANI) is already present in the SS7 setup message. The Charge Number Parameter contains the ANI.

== VoIP enhanced 911 ==
VoIP enhanced 911 pertains to communications originating from various commercial services provided by companies that send telephone calls across the commercial internet using specialized devices and software applications.

As Voice over Internet Protocol (VoIP) technology matured, service providers began to interconnect VoIP with the public telephone network and marketed the VoIP service as a cheap replacement phone service. However, E911 regulations and legal penalties have severely hampered the more widespread adoption of VoIP: VoIP is much more flexible than land line phone service and there is no easy way to verify the physical location of a caller on a nomadic VoIP network at any given time (especially in the case of wireless networks), and so many providers offered services which specifically excluded 911 service so as to avoid the severe E-911 non-compliance penalties. VoIP services tried to improvise, such as routing 911 calls to the administrative phone number of the Public Safety Answering Point, adding on software to track phone locations, etc.

The Location Information Server is a service that is provided by an access network provider to provide location information to users of the network. To do this, it uses knowledge of network topology and a range of location determination techniques to locate devices that are attached to the network. The precise methods that are used to determine location are dependent on the type of access network and the information that can be obtained from the device.

Initially, the U.S. Federal Communications Commission (FCC) took a hands-off approach to VoIP in order to let the service mature, and also to facilitate competition in the telephony market. In time, this problem reached the headlines of newspapers as individuals were unable to place emergency calls with their VoIP phones. In March 2005, Texas Attorney General Greg Abbott filed a lawsuit against Vonage for deceptive marketing practices by not making it clear that VoIP users had to actually sign up for E911 service.

When FCC Chair Kevin Martin replaced FCC Chair Michael Powell, he immediately changed FCC's hands-off policy and moved to impose 911 obligations on VoIP service providers. In 2005, Chair Martin moved FCC to require "interconnected VoIP services" to begin to provide 911 service and provide notice to their consumers concerning the 911 limitations. The FCC announced that customers must respond to the E911 VoIP warning and those who do not have their service cut off on August 30, 2005. The FCC extended the deadline to September 28, 2005. The E911 hookup may be directly with the Wireline E911 Network, indirectly through a third party such as a competitive local exchange carrier (CLEC), or by any other technical means. The FCC explained that they felt compelled to issue this mandate because of the public safety concerns. Vonage co-founder Jeff Pulver opined that this was an attempt by FCC Chair Martin to hinder telephony competition to AT&T.

The 911 obligations were imposed only on "interconnected VoIP." The FCC defined "interconnected VoIP" as VoIP over broadband that interconnects with the public switch telephone network. VoIP that is not interconnected, such as two individuals talking to each other over the Internet while playing computer games, does not fall under the obligation.

There are, however, complicated technological problems with implementing E911 with VoIP, which providers are attempting to solve. VoIP phones are on the Internet and nomadic; the geolocation of the individual placing the 911 call can be very difficult to determine. Service providers are attempting to phase in solutions through the I1, I2, and I3 phases. During I1, the 911 call was routed to the 911 administrative telephone lines without location information. During I2, VoIP services would participate in the public telephone networks location database for the location that is identified with that telephone number. During the I3 solution, VoIP service providers would have a true IP interconnection with Public Safety Answering Points and would be able to provide even more valuable information than the legacy 911 system. Where VoIP phones are mobile, geolocation has additional problems; VoIP service providers are seeking access to mobile phone location databases. These solutions are being developed through the cooperation of the Voice on the Network Coalition and the National Emergency Number Association. Vonage has encouraged its customers to register the locations from which their 911 calls could be dialed with the local public safety answering point. The FCC had continued to add more requirements and mandate a more sophisticated 911 function.

VoIP services have noted an obstacle to full 911 interconnection; in order to interconnect with the Public Safety Answering Point, the VoIP service providers must interconnect with the 911 telephone trunk, which is owned and controlled by their competitors, the traditional fixed-line telephone carriers. This resulted in the New and Emerging Technologies 911 Improvement Act of 2008 which granted interconnection rights to interconnected VoIP services.

In response to the E911 challenges inherent to IP phone systems, specialized technology has been developed to locate callers in the case of emergency. Some of these new technologies allow the caller to be located down to the specific office on a particular floor of a building. These solutions support a wide range of organizations with IP telephony networks. The solutions are available for service providers offering hosted IP-PBX and residential VoIP services. This increasingly important segment in IP phone technology includes E911 call routing services and automated phone tracking appliances. Many of these solutions have been established according to FCC, CRTC, and NENA i2 standards, in order to help enterprises and service providers reduce liability concerns and meet E911 regulations.

In recent years there have been numerous important developments in E911 solutions for IP phone technology. The more noteworthy of these developments include:

- On-site appliances that automate and simplify E911 management for enterprise IP-PBX systems, reducing administration, ensuring that IP phone locations are always up to date, thus helping enterprises meet their E911 obligations;
- IP phone tracking that automatically assigns locations to IP hard phones, soft phones and wireless phones as they move on the corporate network using layer 2, layer 3, or wireless LAN discovery.
- Support for remote employees, allowing off-campus users and teleworkers to update their locations in real time directly from their IP phones;
- Support for phone mobility, to ensure accurate E911 services for employees that move IP phones between locations, share line appearances between multiple devices, and log into IP phones on the fly;
- Security desk routing and notification functionalities that deliver 911 calls and custom email alerts to on-site security personnel, notifying them of the emergency and providing them with the caller’s precise location information;
- Advanced E911 call management and reporting features, such as misdial protection and call recording, to improve solution performance and administration.

VoIP & 911 issues are also relevant to Telecom Relay Services utilized by individuals with disabilities.

== Multi-line Telephone System ==
Multi-line Telephone System (MLTS) pertains to the location of callers dialing 911 from within the private telecommunications networks used by large organizations. A Multi-line Telephone System (MLTS), often referred to as a private branch exchange, is a telecommunications switching system used by large organizations to process calls between employees within the organization and with parties external to the organization. An MLTS may serve a single building, segments of multi-tenant buildings, a group of buildings on a campus or even a number of buildings separated by geography. New communications technologies are making it possible for single MLTS systems to serve locations at far distant places that may span multiple governmental jurisdictions even distant countries.

The challenge of Enhanced 911 for the MLTS is that information about the location of callers is only available to the extent that the private organization discloses the information. For the organization, collecting and reporting the information can be challenging. Today’s mobile work forces and technologies that allow users to relocate without the intervention of an administrator place significant responsibilities on the MLTS owner or operator.

== MLTS Legislation ==
On August 1, 2019, the FCC adopted a Report and Order to address calls to 911 made from multi-line telephone systems (MLTS) that commonly serve hotels and office buildings, pursuant to Kari’s Law. The Report and Order also addressed sending dispatchable location information with 911 calls, and consolidating the FCC's 911 rules.

Under the provisions outlined in Kari's Law, new and upgraded MLTS systems after February 17, 2020, must:

- Enable the public to dial 911 from MLTS directly, without having to dial additional numbers, such as a “9,” to reach an outside line.
- Require MLTS to send a notification to a location where someone is likely to hear or see it when a 911 call has been made.

In addition to Kari's Law, §506 of the Ray Baum's Act adds the requirement that by January 6, 2021, wired MLTS devices must:

- Establish dispatchable location information requirements for 911 calls from MLTS, fixed telephone services, interconnected Voice over Internet Protocol (VoIP) services, mobile text, and Internet-based Telecommunications Relay Services (TRS).

Wireless devices have an additional year to be made compliant.

Dispatchable location is defined as: The street address of the calling party Information such as room number, floor number, and other similar information necessary to adequately identify the location of the calling party.

In a recent Podcast recorded at the NENA 911 Goes to Washington event in Washington DC, David Furth, the Deputy Director of Public Safety and Homeland Security provided a recap of the legislative actions.

The legislation does over rule any current State legislation, that currently exists in numerous US government jurisdictions, unless the Federal requirements are more restrictive. The burden still remains upon the enterprise organization to provide compliance when an emergency call originates from within a MLTS system, however the new language also adds responsibility to Manufacturers, Importers, Distributors, and Installers as well s the person who owns, operates. rents, buys or leases the system.

The member driven volunteer organization that represents the people who staff the PSAPs, the National Emergency Number Association, has done significant work advocating on the subject of MLTS E911. Hank Hunt, Kari Hunt's father has championed the legislation, named after his late daughter, which started as a promise to his granddaughter who knew to dial 9-1-1 from the hotel room phone, but had no idea the phone needed a 9 to dial an outside line. Hank is carrying on the legacy of Kari and is a popular speaker at Public Safety and Telecom shows and events. His actions are funded through The Kari Hunt Foundation, a 501(c)(3) non-profit.

It is an important contemporary issue of growing concern as enterprise style organizations employ new technologies to create private networks that interconnect with the PSTN in ways that do not map to the logic used to locate callers in the Public Enhanced 911 system. The risks to people who initiate a 911 call from an MLTS who are not physically located within the jurisdiction of the agency to which the 911 call is routed and the increasing burdens of misdirected 911 calls upon those agencies is escalating.

The FCC Report and Order outlines the actions taken:

== Privacy concerns ==
The FBI CAST Cellular Analysis & Geo-Location Field Resource Guide reveals that wireless carriers in the U.S. routinely activate E911 functionality on their customers' mobile phones for the purposes of tracking their locations without their permission, as of March 2019. Telecommunications companies then provide this location data to various government agencies that request it, making it clear that use of E911 functionality is not limited to emergencies and that the technology is often implemented in such a way that tracking can be remotely activated without the user's knowledge or consent.

After a national test of Wireless Emergency Alerts (live since 2012) on October 3, 2018, a number of rumours and false statements spread on social media. Among them a tweet by John McAfee that went viral, in which McAfee claimed that the "Presidential alert" involved the E911 system, and that smartphones have a "E911 chip" capable of giving the government access to the phone's location and microphone. The Electronic Frontier Foundation reported that there is "no such thing as an E911 chip". Fact-checking website Snopes stated that "WEA messages are not [related] to E911 functions".

== See also ==
- Advanced Mobile Location – Widely implemented caller location for emergency services
- Emergency Medical Dispatcher – Telecommunicator that dispatches emergency medical services
- GPS tracking – Device using satellite navigation to determine geolocation
- Mobile phone tracking – Identifying the location of a mobile phone
- Next Generation 9-1-1 – Telephony project in the United States
- Reverse geocoding – Resolving coordinates to a readable address or place name
- Text-to-911 – Technology for operators to receive text
