= Third Party Control Protocol =

Network protocol

Third Party Control Protocol (TPCP) is a client-server protocol with three types of primitives:

- Request (used by the client),
- Notify (used by the server to send state information to the client),
- Responses (sent as a response to a request)

TPCP is the Protocol used for third party call control 3pcc. TPCP is the protocol used by the controller while communicating with the control server over the control let. TPCP is used to initiate, control and observe sessions between remote parties.
