= 999 (emergency telephone number) =

Emergency number in several countries

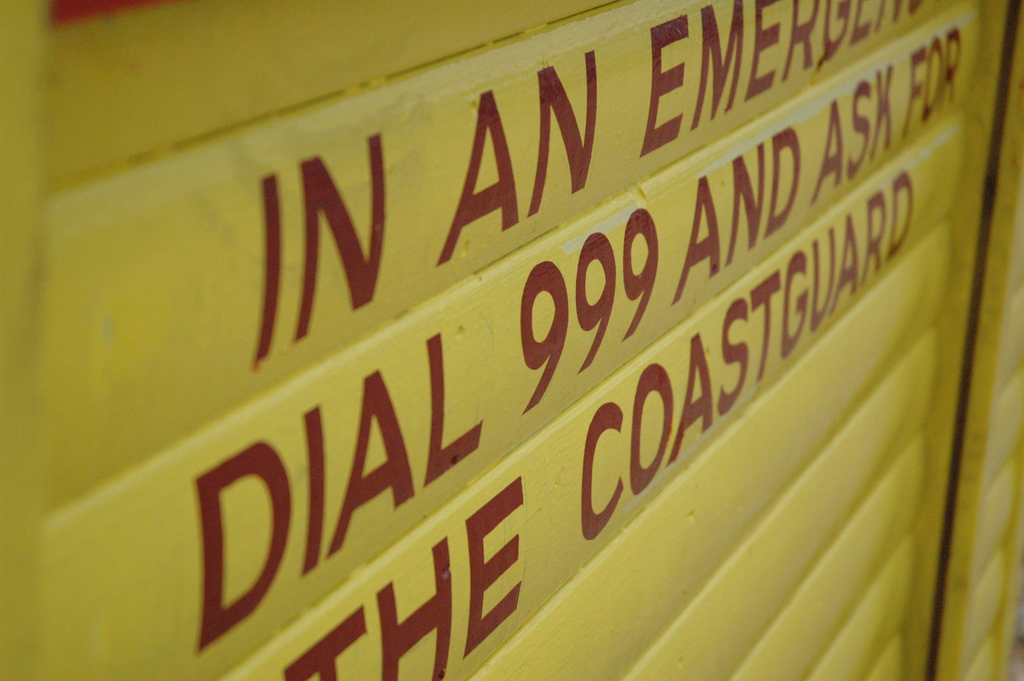
A sign on a beach in Whitstable, United Kingdom, advising readers to dial 999 and to request for the coastguard in the event of an emergency

999 is an official emergency telephone number in a number of countries and allows the caller to contact emergency services for assistance. Countries and territories using the number include Bahrain, Bangladesh, Botswana, the Cook Islands, Eswatini, Ghana, Guernsey, Hong Kong, the Republic of Ireland, the Isle of Man, Jersey, Kenya, Macau, Malaysia, Mauritius, Niue, Poland, Qatar, Sudan, Saudi Arabia, Singapore, Trinidad and Tobago, Seychelles, Uganda, the United Arab Emirates, the United Kingdom, and Zimbabwe.

== United Kingdom ==
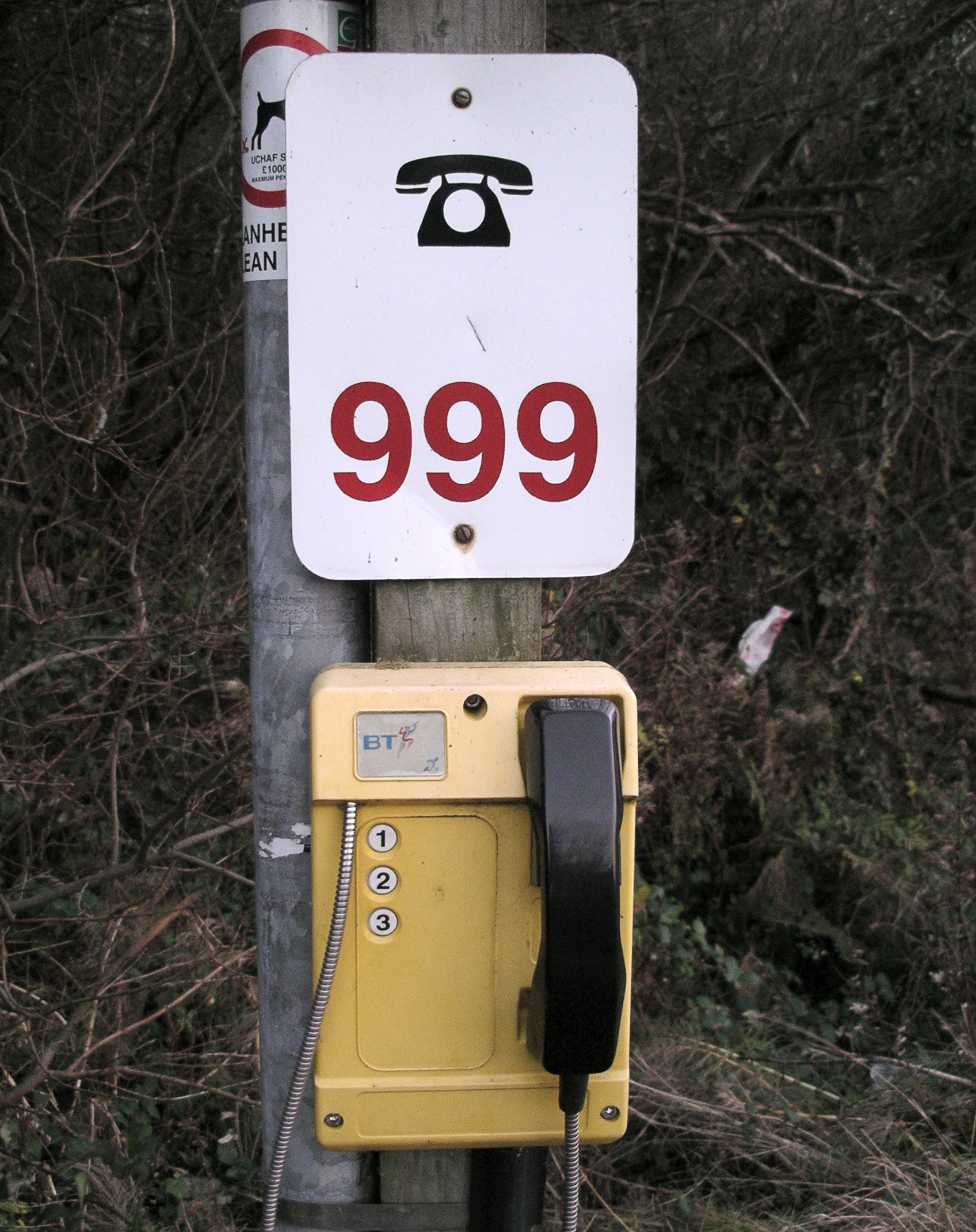
An emergency phone on the Welsh coast at Trefor featuring 999.

999 is the official emergency services number for the United Kingdom, but calls are also accepted on the European Union emergency number, 112. All calls are answered by 999 operators and are always free. Approximately 35 million 999/112 calls are made in the UK each year, with 74% from mobiles and 26% from landlines in 2022.

=== Emergency services ===
Distribution of emergency calls between service ECC in the United Kingdom (based on 2022 data of 35 million 999/112 calls)
1. Ambulance (53.0%)
2. Police (44.0%)
3. Fire (3.00%)
4. Coastguard (0.00%)

In the United Kingdom there are four emergency services, which maintain full-time emergency control centres (ECC), to which 999 emergency calls may be routed direct by emergency operators in telephone company operator assistance centres (OAC). These services are as follows, listed in the order of percentage of calls received:

- Ambulance
- Police
- Fire
- HM Coastguard

Other emergency services may also be reached through the 999 system but do not maintain permanent emergency control centres. All of these emergency services are summoned through the ECC of one of the four principal services listed above:

- Lifeboat
- Mountain rescue
- Cave rescue
- Mine rescue
- Bomb disposal (provided by the British Armed Forces)

=== History ===
First introduced in the London area on 30 June 1937, the UK's 999 number is the world's oldest emergency call telephone service. The system was introduced following a house fire in Wimpole Street on 10 November 1935, in which five women were killed. A neighbour had tried to telephone the fire brigade and was so outraged at being held in a queue by the Welbeck telephone exchange that he wrote a letter to the editor of The Times, which prompted a government inquiry. Days after the service launched, a Hampstead woman made its first call, which resulted in burglar Thomas Duffy being caught in the act while raiding a house.

The initial scheme covered a 12-mile (19 km) radius around Oxford Circus and the public were advised use it only in an ongoing emergency if "for instance, the man in the flat next to yours is murdering his wife or you have seen a heavily masked cat burglar peering round the stack pipe of the local bank building." The first arrest – for burglary – took place a week later and the scheme was extended to major cities after World War II and then to the whole of the UK in 1976.

The 9-9-9 format was chosen based on the "button A" and "button B" design of pre-payment coin-operated public payphones in wide use (first introduced in 1925), which could be easily modified to allow free use of the 9 digit on the rotary dial in addition to the 0 digit (then used to call the operator), without allowing free use of numbers involving other digits; other combinations of free call 9 and 0 were later used for more purposes, including multiples of 9 (to access exchanges before subscriber trunk dialling came into use) as a fail-safe for attempted emergency calls, e.g. 9 or 99, reaching at least an operator.

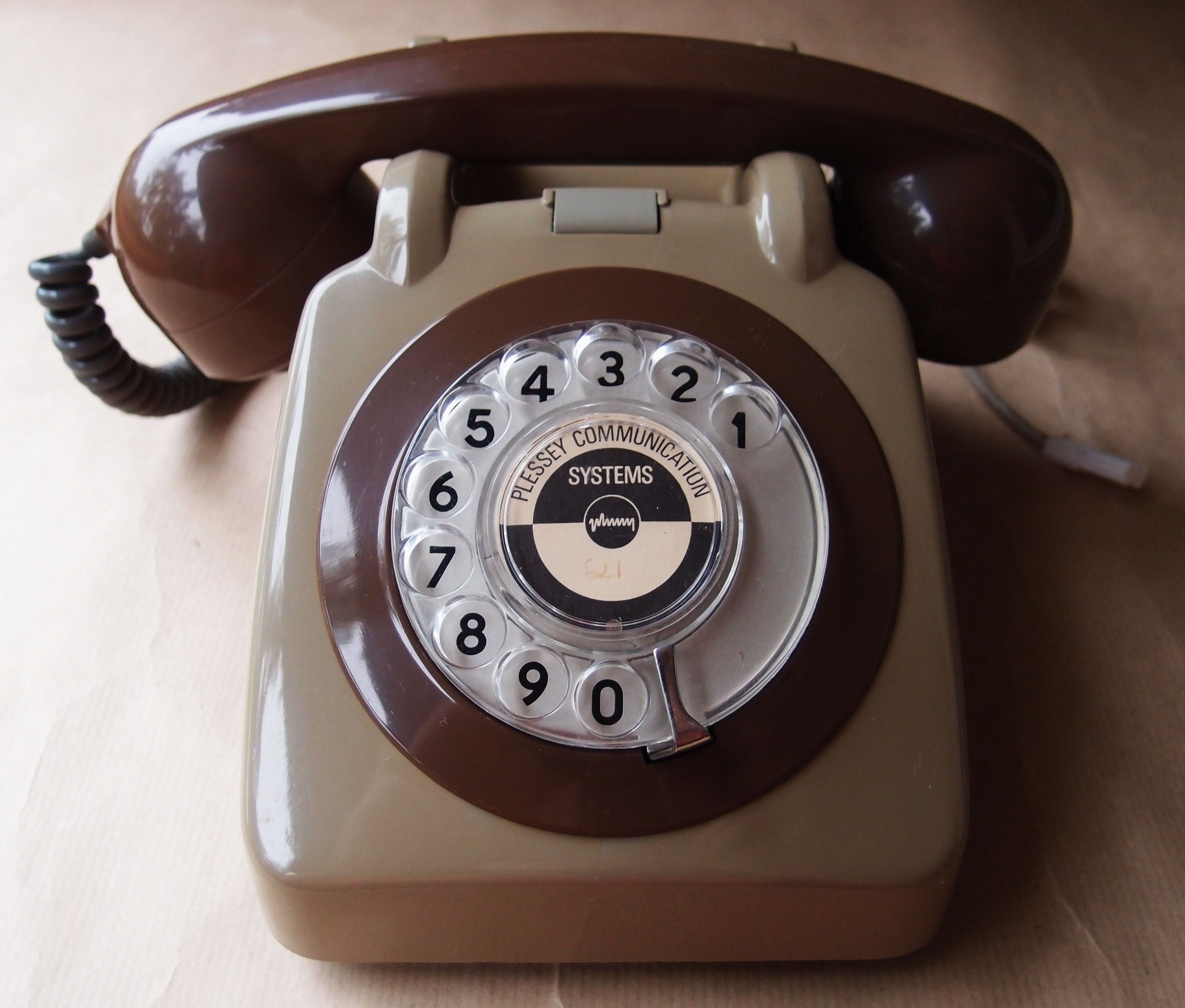
Rotary phone

The choice of 999 was fortunate for accessibility, because in the dark or in dense smoke 999 could be dialled by placing a finger one hole away from the dial stop (see the articles on rotary dial and GPO telephones) and rotating the dial to the full extent three times. This enabled all users including the visually impaired to dial the emergency number easily. It is also the case that it is relatively easy for 111, and other low-number sequences, to be called accidentally, including when transmission wires making momentary contact produce a pulse similar to dialling (e.g. when overhead cables touch in high winds).

Hoax calls and improper use are a problem. For these reasons there are frequent public information campaigns in the UK on the correct use of the 999 system.

Alternative three-digit numbers for non-emergency calls have also been introduced in recent years. 101 was introduced for non-urgent calls to Police in England and Wales and later extended to Scotland and Northern Ireland.

Trials of 111 as a number to access health services in the UK for urgent but not life-threatening cases began in England in 2010. The main roll-out was originally meant to be finished by April 2013 but was not completed until February 2014. In Scotland, the NHS24 service moved from 0845 424 2424 to 111 on 29 April 2014. NHS 111 Wales (formally NHS Direct Wales) can now be accessed through the 111 number. It previously used 0845 46 47 but the rollout of 111 was completed, following trials starting in 2016

In 2008–2009 Nottinghamshire Police ran a successful pilot of Pegasus, a database containing the details of people with physical and learning disabilities or mental health problems, who have registered with the force because their disabilities make it difficult for them to give spoken details when calling the police. Those registered on the database are issued with a personal identification number (PIN) that can be used in two ways. By phone – either 999 or the force's non-emergency 101 number can be used – once a person is put through to the control room, they only need to say "Pegasus" and their PIN. Their details can then be retrieved from the database and the caller can quickly get on with explaining why they have called. In person – the Pegasus PIN can be told or shown to a police officer. Pegasus is also used by the City of London Police, Dyfed Powys Police, Surrey Police & Lincolnshire Police.

The use of push-button telephones can cause problems, because it is easy to push the same button repeatedly by accident, e.g. by objects in the same pocket as the telephone (termed "pocket dialling") or by children playing with it. This problem is less of a concern with emergency numbers that use two different digits, such as 112 and 911, although on landlines 112 suffers much of the same risk of false generation as the 111 code, which was considered and rejected when the original choice of 999 was made.

The pan-European 112 code was introduced in the UK in April 1995 with little publicity. It connects to existing 999 circuits. The GSM standard mandates that a user can dial 112 without unlocking the keypad, which can save time but also causes some accidental calls.

Silent solution 55 is the name given to the initiative that allows people to call 999 when they are not able to speak. If the caller does not initially respond to opening questions, the operator will then ask the caller to cough, tap their handset or make another audible sign that indicates they are in need of emergency assistance. In some instances when there is still no clear response, the call may be put through to an automated system that asks the caller to press 55 if in danger.

=== Procedure ===
999 or 112 is used to contact the emergency services upon witnessing or being involved in an emergency. In the United Kingdom, the numbers 999 and 112 both connect to the same service, and there is no priority or charge for either of them. Calls to 911, North America's emergency number, may be transferred to the 999 call system if the call is made within the United Kingdom from a mobile phone.

An emergency can be:

- A person in need of immediate medical assistance, or an immediate danger to life
- Suspicion that a crime is in progress, or that an offender is in the area
- Structure on fire
- Another serious incident that needs immediate emergency service attendance

All telecoms providers operating in the UK are obliged as part of their licence agreement to provide a free of charge emergency operator service. As of 2014 emergency calls made on any network in the UK are handled by BT. BT operates seven call centres nationally to take 999/112 calls.

A flowchart for a 999 call

When 999 or 112 is dialled an operator will answer the call and ask, "Emergency. Which service?" Previously operators asked "Which service do you require?" (approximately up to the mid-90s).

The operator will then transfer the call to the appropriate service's own call-taker. If the caller is unsure as to which service they require, the operator will transfer the call to the police, and if an incident requires more than one service, for instance a road traffic accident with injuries and trapped people, one service will alert the others. (The operator has to contact each service individually, whether or not the caller remains on the line.) The caller will be connected to the service which covers the area that they are (or appear to be) calling from.

On 6 October 1998, BT introduced a new system whereby all the information about the location of the calling telephone was transmitted electronically to the relevant service rather than having to be read out (with the possibility of errors). This system is called EISEC (Enhanced Information Service for Emergency Calls). Before it, the operator had to start the connection to the emergency service control room by stating their own location, then the caller's telephone number, e.g. "Bangor connecting 01248 300 000". It was common for the caller to be confused why the operator was talking to the emergency service, and frequently talked over the operator. Only around half of the emergency authorities have EISEC, although the number is ever increasing.

Although the initial response to all 999 calls is in English, callers who reply in Welsh are transferred to the Bangor control room where the call will be taken by Welsh-speaking operators.

The rooms in which operators work are called operator assistance centres (OACs). There are six BT OACs. The rooms in which emergency response operators work are called emergency control centres (ECCs) and are operated by local authorities.

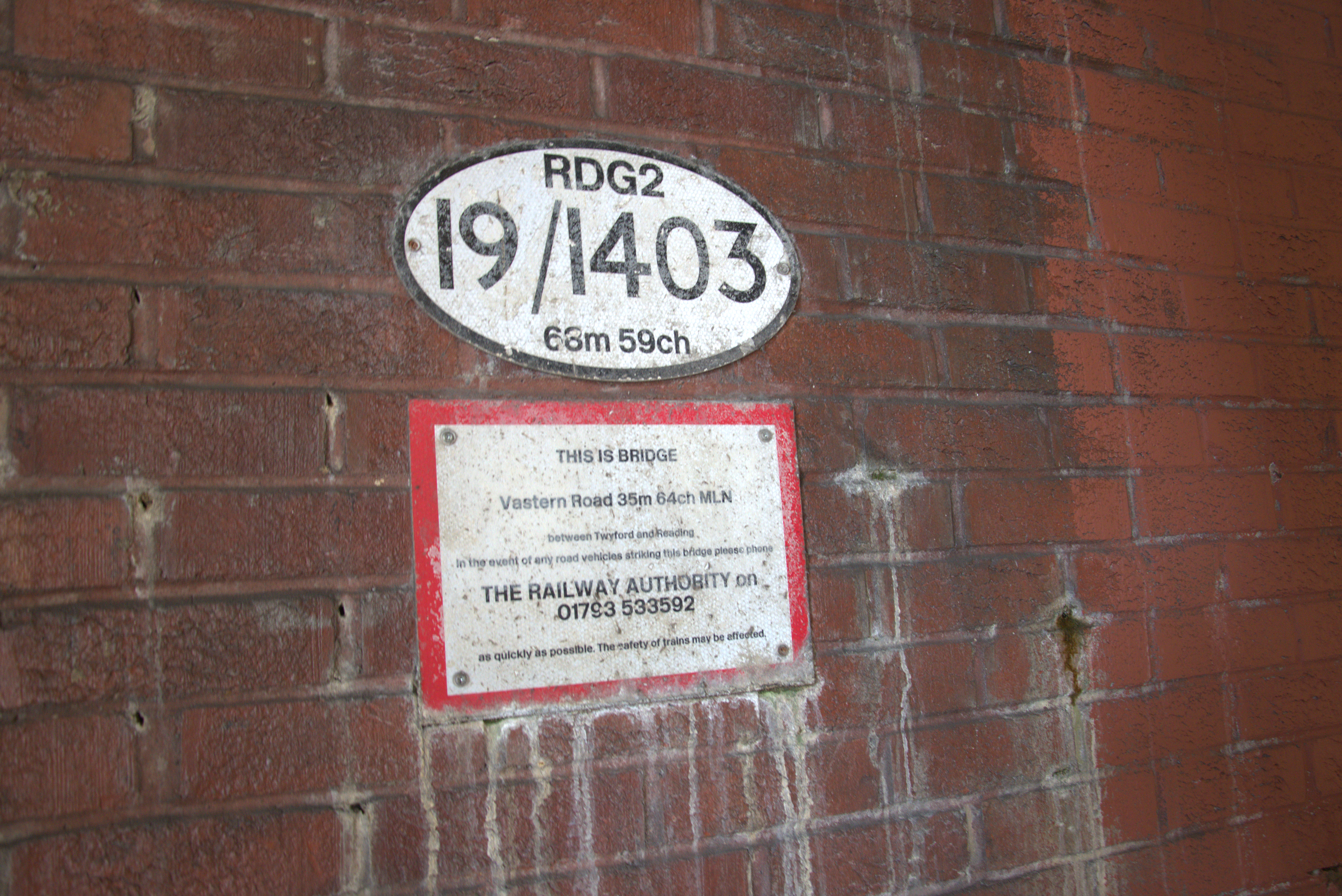
Railway signs showing the distance to Reading station from a bridge, and emergency contact details if a vehicle strikes the bridge.

In some situations there may be specific instructions on nearby signs to notify some other authority of an emergency before calling 999. For example, railway bridges may carry signs advising that if a road vehicle strikes the bridge the railway authority (usually Network Rail) should be called first on a given number. Network Rail has its own procedures to alert trains to the emergency and to stop them if necessary. The instructions on the signs state 999 should then be dialled and that the police should be requested.

Access to the 999/112 service is provided for the hearing-impaired via Textphone and use of the Text Relay service, run by BT to cover all telephone providers, and previously known as the RNID "Typetalk" relay service. The number is 18000.

999 is also accessible via SMS for pre-registered users. The service is open for anyone to register and works with all major providers in the UK.

=== Location ===
The caller's location will not be passed onto the emergency services immediately, but it is possible to trace both landline and mobile telephone numbers with the BT operator; the former can be traced to an address. The latter can be immediately traced to a grid reference according to the transmitter being used. However, this is only accurate to a certain wide area – for more specific traces, authority must be sought and an expensive operation can be conducted to trace the mobile phone to within a few metres. A number of smartphone apps can now be downloaded that assist with caller location by using the smartphone's satellite navigation features.

Since 2014, smartphones which implement Advanced Mobile Location will detect that an emergency call is being placed, and use any available location services (WiFi or GPS based location) to send an emergency SMS containing an identifier for the call and the phone's location, accurate to 30 metres. This is intended to be received by the mobile operator whilst the call is in progress.

On some occasions callers will be put through to the wrong area service – this is called a "misrouted nines". The most common reason for this is when a mobile phone calls 999 and is using a radio transmitter that is located in another force area; most frequently these are calls that are made within a few miles of a border. Upon establishing the incident location, the emergency service operator will relay the information to the responsible force for their dispatch. In most areas, forces will respond to incidents just beyond their border if they could get there quicker, assist, and then hand over to other forces when they arrive.

On strategic routes like almost all motorways and some major A roads in the United Kingdom, National Highways have placed blue driver location signs with the location printed on them, at approximately 500-metre intervals. Although emergency SOS phones are placed along the hard shoulder on all motorways (and in emergency refuge areas on smart motorways) which automatically send location information to the National Highways regional control centre (RCC), most people involved in a road emergency call from their mobile phones and so need another way to identify their location. These signs contain a code which can be given to the emergency operator or the RCC. For example, a sign may say "M1 A 100.5". This translates as the M1 motorway, on the "A" carriageway, at 100.5 kilometres from the M1's nominal start at Staples Corner. The "A" and "B" carriageways are designated by Highways England to each carriageway, dependent upon which direction it travels; these normally refer to whether the carriageway goes "Away from London" or "Back to London". On circular motorways like the London Orbital M25 and M60 Manchester Outer Ring Road, the clockwise carriageway is the A carriageway and the anti-clockwise carriageway is the B carriageway. Letters J, K, L and M refer to slip roads at junctions. These signs are in addition to the pre-existing 100m distance marker posts alongside the carriageway.

=== Abandoned and hoax calls ===
An abandoned call is when a caller, intentionally or otherwise, rings 999 and then ends the call or stays silent. Abandoned calls are filtered by BT emergency operators and are either disconnected or passed on to police.

They are normally disconnected by the operator repeating "Emergency. Which service?", then if no response is given, the operator will say "Do you need fire, police or ambulance?". If there is still no response, the operator will sometimes ask the caller to press the keypad or make a noise if they need assistance. If no response is given, they will confirm they are clearing the line.

For abandoned calls, if the caller requests the police and the call is routed to police and then the line is dropped, either while waiting for connection or on the line with police, they are checked by police and called back. If there is no answer, the police service are likely to attend and if the line is disconnected without the caller telling the operator which service they need, they then make a decision to filter the call to police (if suspicious background noise) or clear the line.

The most common reasons for abandoned calls include:

- Accidental dialling of 999 on mobile phones. As a GSM standard, mobile phones still allow emergency calls to be made even with the keypad locked.
- Faulty phone lines.
- Believing an urban myth that says dialling 999 charges mobile phone batteries.

== Ireland ==
In Ireland, 999 (and the European and GSM standard 112) are the national emergency numbers. The 999 and 112 service is able to respond in English, Irish, Polish, French, German and Italian. 999 and 112 operators in Ireland answer the calls in under one second and say "Emergency, which service?". The caller may then request the Gardaí (police), ambulance, fire service, coast guard, or cave and mountain rescue service. The caller is then transferred to the emergency dispatcher for the appropriate service.

== Gibraltar ==
In 2024, Gibraltar adopted 999 as its emergency services number, for police, ambulance or fire and rescue; the Royal Gibraltar Police said this was chosen because the territory was closely aligned with the UK, with the aim in future being to have a unified control room. Previously, 199, along with 112, had been used for the police, with 190 being used for fire and ambulance services.

== Bangladesh ==
Logo of "National Emergency Service" of Bangladesh

In Bangladesh, 999 is the national emergency number. It officially launched on 12 December 2017. This number is toll-free. Calling this number connects the caller to an operator, who then connects the caller to the police, ambulance or fire service.

The services are provided under a national emergency help desk operated by the Bangladesh Police, which has been set up at a cost of Tk 60.50 crore. Although the 'National Emergency Service 999' is operated by the Bangladesh Police, fire service and civil defence personnel and the ambulance service dispatchers of the Department of Health also work closely with the police 24/7 to ensure proper service.

In the past, dialling 100 would connect to Bangladesh Police, 101 to Rapid Action Battalion, 102 to fire services, 103 to ambulance service and 104 to the Access to Information Programme under the Prime Minister's Office.

== Hong Kong and Macau ==
999 was introduced to Hong Kong for emergency services (Police, Fire-fighting Services and Ambulance Services) during British rule and continues to be used following the transfer of sovereignty.

Macau also adopted the 999 number; it also introduced two emergency hotline numbers: 110 (mainly for tourists from mainland China) and 112 (mainly for tourists from overseas).

The worldwide emergency number for GSM mobile phones, 112, also works on all GSM networks in the territories. Calls made to this number are redirected to the 999 call centre.

== Malaysia ==
The 999 emergency services in Malaysia is staffed by about 138 telephonists from Telekom Malaysia. Like Singapore, the number was inherited from British rule and continued after independence. Ongoing upgrading works are taking place to introduce the Computer-Telephony Integration (CTI) for hospital exchanges, digital mapping to track the callers' locations and Computer Assisted Despatching (CAD) for online connectivity among the agencies providing the emergency services in the country. All calls to the number are made free of charge. In the late 90s, the number 994 was adopted as a direct connection to fire stations, but use of the number has been discontinued due to cost-saving measures taken by the government. 991 connects to civil services.

The worldwide emergency number for GSM mobile phones, 112, also works on all GSM networks in the country. Calls made to this number are redirected to the 999 call centre.

On 1 July 2024, TM and the Government of Malaysia today signed an agreement to develop and operate the nation’s new emergency response system, the Next Generation Emergency Services 999 (NG999) replacing the current MERS999. Deputy Communications Minister Teo Nie Ching said NG999 is an integrated strategic digital system that will enhance resource and data sharing between emergency call centres and relevant central agencies, thereby improving the efficiency of emergency services. NG999 integrates web-based digital maps, caller IDs, geolocation services, use of Artificial Intelligence (AI) and mobile smart apps to improve emergency response times nationwide.

== Mauritius ==
Mauritius uses the 999 number as the primary or main service to contact the police, fire or ambulance services. Mauritius also uses a separate 114 number for ambulances, 115 for fires and 112 for the police.

== Poland ==
In Poland, 999 is the national emergency telephone number dedicated to medical emergencies, allowing direct contact with the emergency medical services. It is available alongside the universal 112 number, which is intended for all types of emergencies. Calls to 999 are routed according to the caller's location to one of the 23 medical dispatch centers maintained by the voivode's offices. The calls are handled by a medical dispatcher who assesses the situation and the patient's condition, instructs the caller in first aid, dispatches emergency medical service units, provides responding units with relevant information, coordinates the response, and requests assistance from or passes information to other emergency services and healthcare facilities. Medical dispatchers are either nurses or paramedics with a three-year work experience in emergency medical services required.

== United Arab Emirates ==
In the United Arab Emirates, the 999 service is used to contact the police who are also capable of forwarding the call as appropriate to the ambulance or fire services. The number 998 connects directly to the ambulance service and 997 to the fire brigade.

== Saudi Arabia ==
In Saudi Arabia, the 999 service is used to directly contact the police who are also capable of forwarding the call to other emergency services as deemed appropriate. The number 997 connects directly to the ambulance service and 998 to the civil defence. However, the 911 number is the main number used in Saudi Arabia.

== Sudan ==
In Sudan, the 999 service is the primary or main service used to contact the police, fire or ambulance services.

== Singapore ==
In Singapore, the number 999 was inherited from British rule and continued after independence. The number is attributed more to requesting for the police, with the number 995, established in 1984, used for direct lines to the fire brigade and ambulance services of the Singapore Civil Defence Force. Because most of the population of Singapore is Chinese, it is likely that 995 was adopted because the Chinese pronunciation for that number (九九五, jiǔ jiǔ wǔ) sounds similar to the Chinese phrase for 'Save me' (救救我, jiù jiù wǒ).

== Eswatini ==
The Kingdom of Eswatini uses the 999 emergency number for police contact only, and 975 for human trafficking reports. The other emergency numbers in use are 977 for emergency medical assistance and 933 for the fire service.

== Trinidad and Tobago ==
In Trinidad and Tobago, 999 is used to contact the police only. The number 811 is used for the ambulance service and 990 for the fire brigade.

== Uganda ==
In Uganda, callers can call the police on either 112 or 999.

== Zimbabwe ==
In Zimbabwe, the 999 service is the primary or main service used to contact the police, fire or ambulance services. Zimbabwe has a unified emergency number for all services.

== Canada ==
- In 1959, Winnipeg, Manitoba (16 municipalities) used 9-9-9 as the first North American deployment of a local unified emergency number. North America later standardised on 9-1-1, with +1-204-999-xxxx eventually reassigned as a standard mobile telephone exchange. Even in 2022, dialling 9-9-9 in certain areas of Canada, e.g., Gatineau, QC, may be transferred to the 911 call system.

== See also ==
- 000 – emergency number in Australia
- 110 — emergency telephone number in China and Japan
- 111 – emergency number in New Zealand
- 112 – emergency number across the European Union and on GSM mobile networks across the world
- 119 – emergency number in Jamaica and parts of Asia
- 911 – emergency number in North America and the Philippines
- 101 – non-emergency number for contacting the police in England, Northern Ireland, Scotland, and Wales
- 999 phone charging myth
- eCall
- Emergency Control Centre
- Emergency telephone
- Emergency telephone number
- In case of emergency
- Single Non-Emergency Number
