= National Emergency Number Association =

Agency coordinating one emergency phone number in the United States

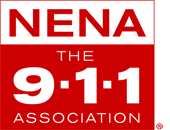

The National Emergency Number Association (NENA) is an organization whose mission it is to foster the technological advancement, availability, and implementation of a universal emergency telephone number system in the United States. In carrying out its mission, NENA promotes research, planning, training and education. The protection of human life, the preservation of property and the maintenance of general community security are among NENA's objectives.

One of NENA's main functions is to grade the quality of the 9-1-1 (the Universal Emergency Number since 1968) services that exist throughout the United States. Through their Report Card to the Nation (RCN), the RCN Commission reviews and grades the performance of 9-1-1 centres based on their established standards of practice. NENA is tracking the deployment of Enhanced 9-1-1 and the Wireless Phase 1 and 2 initiatives. The latter are enabling 9-1-1 call takers to (in Phase 1) identify the cell tower related to the caller and (in Phase 2) to identify the actual geographic location of the caller.

In 2021, the Denver's 911 was reported as "out of compliance".
